= List of current women's boxing rankings =

This is a list of current women's professional boxing rankings, which includes the latest rankings by each one of the sport's four major sanctioning bodies, as well as other well-regarded sites and entities.

== Overview ==
As professional boxing has four major sanctioning bodies (WBA, WBC, IBF, WBO) each with their own champions, the sport doesn't have a centralized ranking system. The rankings published by these organizations share the trait of not ranking the other organizations' champions, as each one of the sanctioning bodies expects their champion to frequently defend their title against their top-ranked contender. The WBA often has more than one champion, none of which are ranked by the other 3 sanctioning bodies. Their "Super" and "Regular" champions are excluded from the rankings but their "Interim" champion is affixed to the #1 spot. The IBF's protocol is for the top 2 spots in its rankings to remain vacant until two of its other top-ranked contenders face off, at which point the winner takes one of those two places.

In addition to the rankings published by the major sanctioning bodies, The Ring publish their own independent rankings, not excluding any organizations' champions. The aim of The Ring is to crown a single champion for each division. Every single one of these lists are assembled by a committee but since the 90s, other parties have experimented with computerized rankings, but these are sometimes regarded as incapable of accounting for all of boxing's quirks and subtleties. The most widely known computerized rankings are published by BoxRec and updated daily. The following is a list compiling the latest instalment of all the previously mentioned rankings.

== Current boxing rankings ==
As of 30 September 2021

C	Champion

=== Heavyweight ===
Rank	BoxRec	The Ring	WBA	WBC	IBF	WBO	IBO
C	—N/a	—N/a	—N/a	vacant	vacant	vacant	vacant
1	(United States) Raquel Miller	—N/a	—N/a	(New Zealand) Lani Daniels	(United States) Raquel Miller	—N/a	(United States) Raquel Miller
2	(New Zealand) Roseanna Cox	—N/a	—N/a	(United States) Danielle Perkins	(Nigeria) Bolatito Oluwole	—N/a	(New Zealand) Roseanna Cox
3	(New Zealand) Alrie Meleisea	—N/a	—N/a	(New Zealand) Roseanna Cox	—N/a	—N/a	(New Zealand) Alrie Meleisea
4	(Australia) Che Kenneally	—N/a	—N/a	(Australia) Che Kenneally	—N/a	—N/a	(Canada) Vanessa Lepage-Joanisse
5	(Canada) Vanessa Lepage-Joanisse	—N/a	—N/a	(Dominican Republic) Oxandia Castillo	—N/a	—N/a	(Colombia) Angie Paola Rocha
6	(South Africa) Razel Mohammed	—N/a	—N/a	(United States) Laura Ramsey	—N/a	—N/a	(New Zealand) Trish Vaka
7	(Colombia) Angie Paola Rocha	—N/a	—N/a	(Nigeria) Bolatito Oluwole	—N/a	—N/a	(New Zealand) Sequita Hemingway
8	(New Zealand) Trish Vaka	—N/a	—N/a	(United States) Lorissa Rivas	—N/a	—N/a	(Nigeria) Bolatito Oluwole
9	(Colombia) Minellis Blanco	—N/a	—N/a	(New Zealand) Alrie Meleisea	—N/a	—N/a	(South Africa) Razel Mohammed
10	(New Zealand) Sequita Hemingway	—N/a	—N/a	—N/a	—N/a	—N/a	(United States) Jackie Lea Osborn

=== Light heavyweight ===
Rank	BoxRec	The Ring	WBA	WBC	IBF	WBO	IBO
C	—N/a	—N/a	vacant	—N/a	(New Zealand) Lani Daniels	—N/a	vacant
1	(New Zealand) Lani Daniels	—N/a	(Canada) Vanessa Lepage Joanisse	—N/a	(Russia) Luiza Davydova	—N/a	(Australia) Che Kenneally
2	(Mexico) Angelica López Flores	—N/a	(New Zealand) Roseanna Cox	—N/a	(Nigeria) Bolatito Oluwole	—N/a	(Mexico) Angelica López Flores
3	(Canada) Natasha Spence	—N/a	(Mexico) Angelica López Flores	—N/a	(Australia) Che Kenneally	—N/a	(Russia) Luiza Davydova
4	(Russia) Luiza Davydova	—N/a	(Australia) Che Kenneally	—N/a	(Mexico) Angelica López Flores	—N/a	(Democratic Republic of the Congo) Mwamba Benedict Lulua
5	(Democratic Republic of the Congo) Mwamba Benedict Lulua	—N/a	(Nigeria) Bolatito Oluwole	—N/a	(Canada) Vanessa Lepage-Joanisse	—N/a	(Hungary) Tímea Nagy
6	(Mexico) Maricela Garcia Mendoza	—N/a	(Colombia) Minellis Blanco	—N/a	vacant	—N/a	(Mexico) Maricela Garcia Mendoza
7	(Hungary) Tímea Nagy	—N/a	(Colombia) Angie Paola Rocha	—N/a	vacant	—N/a	(Nigeria) Mary Eze
8	(Nigeria) Mary Eze	—N/a	(Dominican Republic) Oxandia Castillo	—N/a	vacant	—N/a	(Slovakia) Szilvia Rafaelová
9	(Nigeria) Abiola Olawale	—N/a	(Dominican Republic) Mary Caba Rancier	—N/a	vacant	—N/a	(Nigeria) Abiola Olawale
10	(Slovakia) Szilvia Rafaelová	—N/a	vacant	—N/a	vacant	—N/a	(Philippines) Kimberly Labajo

=== Super middleweight ===
Rank	BoxRec	The Ring (as of 13 April 2022)	WBA	WBC	IBF	WBO	IBO
C	—N/a	vacant	(United States) Franchón Crews-Dezurn	(United States) Franchón Crews-Dezurn	(United States) Franchón Crews-Dezurn	(United States) Franchón Crews-Dezurn	vacant
1	(Germany) Christina Hammer	(Sweden) Elin Cederroos	(Germany) Christina Hammer	(United States) Shadasia Green	(United States) Alicia Napoleon	—N/a	(Germany) Christina Hammer
2	(Sweden) Elin Cederroos	(United States) Franchón Crews-Dezurn	(United States) Shadasia Green	(Germany) Christina Hammer	(Slovenia) Ema Kozin	—N/a	(United States) Shadasia Green
3	(United States) Alicia Napoleon	(Slovenia) Ema Kozin	(United States) Alicia Napoleon	(Sweden) Elin Cederroos	(Belgium) Femke Hermans	—N/a	(United States) Aidyl Cardenas
4	(United States) Leatitia Robinson	(Germany) Christina Hammer	(United States) Aidyl Cardenas	(United States) Alicia Napoleon	(United States) Maricela Cornejo	—N/a	(Finland) Sanna Turunen
5	(United States) Franchón Crews-Dezurn	(United States) Shadasia Green	(United States) Leatitia Robinson	(Mexico) Angelica Lopez	vacant	—N/a	(Russia) Luiza Davydova
6	(United States) Shadasia Green	—N/a	(Germany) Janina Neumann	(South Africa) Noni Tenge	vacant	—N/a	(United States) Chatiqua Hemingway
7	(Finland) Sanna Turunen	—N/a	(United States) Schemelle Baldwin	(Mexico) Martha Lara	vacant	—N/a	(Germany) Janina Neumann
8	(Russia) Madina Smyslova	—N/a	(Mexico) Diana Tapia	(Belgium) Femke Hermans	vacant	—N/a	(Georgia (country)) Elene Sikmashvili
9	(United States) Chatiqua Hemingway	—N/a	vacant	(Georgia (country)) Elene Sikmashvili	vacant	—N/a	(Mexico) Silvia Zuniga
10	(Mexico) Diana Tapia	—N/a	vacant	(Finland) Sanna Turunen	vacant	—N/a	(Tanzania) Maria Mungi

=== Middleweight ===
Rank	BoxRec	The Ring (as of 13 April 2022)	WBA	WBC	IBF	WBO	IBO
C	—N/a	(United States) Claressa Shields	(United States) Claressa Shields	(United States) Claressa Shields	(United States) Claressa Shields	(United States) Claressa Shields	vacant
1	(United Kingdom) Savannah Marshall	(United Kingdom) Savannah Marshall	(Belgium) Femke Hermans	(United Kingdom) Savannah Marshall	(United States) Tori Nelson	—N/a	(Slovenia) Ema Kozin
2	(Slovenia) Ema Kozin	(Germany) Christina Hammer	(Dominican Republic) Yenebier Guillén	(Mexico) Alma Ibarra	(Germany) Christina Hammer	—N/a	(United States) Maricela Cornejo
3	(India) Lovlina Borgohain	(Slovenia) Ema Kozin	(Croatia) Ivana Habazin	(United States) Tori Nelson	(Croatia) Ivana Habazin	—N/a	(Belgium) Femke Hermans
4	(Sweden) Maria Lindberg	(Belgium) Femke Hermans	(United States) Raquel Miller	(Nigeria) Edith Ogoke	vacant	—N/a	(South Africa) Rita Mrwebi
5	(United States) Maricela Cornejo	(United States) Raquel Miller	(United States) Jordanne Garcia	(Uruguay) Chris Namús	vacant	—N/a	(Dominican Republic) Yenebier Guillén
6	(Belgium) Femke Hermans	—N/a	(Nigeria) Edith Ogoke	(Ghana) Gifty Amanua Ankrah	vacant	—N/a	(United States) Sonya Dreiling
7	(Kenya) Florence Muthoni	—N/a	vacant	vacant	vacant	—N/a	(United States) Olivia Curry
8	(Australia) Tayla Harris	—N/a	vacant	vacant	vacant	—N/a	(United States) Miranda Barber
9	(United States) Logan Holler	—N/a	vacant	vacant	vacant	—N/a	(United States) Kaitlin Lavigne
10	(United States) Sonya Dreiling	—N/a	vacant	vacant	vacant	—N/a	(Fiji) Visila Lagilagi

=== Light middleweight ===
Rank	BoxRec	The Ring	WBA	WBC	IBF	WBO	IBO
C	—N/a	(United States) Claressa Shields	(United Kingdom) Hannah Rankin	(Sweden) Patricia Berghult	(Canada) Marie-Eve Dicaire	(United Kingdom) Natasha Jonas	(United Kingdom) Hannah Rankin
1	(United States) Claressa Shields	(Canada) Marie-Eve Dicaire	(Mexico) Cinthia Lozano	(Poland) Ewa Piątkowska	(Sweden) Maria Lindberg	—N/a	(Canada) Marie-Eve Dicaire
2	(Canada) Marie-Eve Dicaire	(Uruguay) Chris Namús	(Canada) Marie-Eve Dicaire	(United States) Raquel Miller	(United States) Logan Holler	—N/a	(Uruguay) Chris Namús
3	(Argentina) Abril Vidal	(United Kingdom) Hannah Rankin	(United Kingdom) Hannah Rankin	(United States) Logan Holler	(Canada) Marie-Eve Dicaire	—N/a	(United Kingdom) Hannah Rankin
4	(United States) Raquel Miller	(Mexico) Cinthia Lozano	(Sweden) Maria Lindberg	(Canada) Marie-Eve Dicaire	(Australia) Tayla Harris	—N/a	(Sweden) Maria Lindberg
5	(Uruguay) Chris	(United States) Aidyl Cardenas	(Sweden) Marianne Ahlborg	(Dominican Republic) Oxandia Castillo	(Argentina) Abril Vidal	—N/a	(South Africa) Rushda Mallick
6	(Sweden) Mikaela Laurén	—N/a	(United States) Logan Holler	(Sweden) Mikaela Laurén	(Mexico) Alma Ibarra	—N/a	(Dominican Republic) Claribel Mena
7	(Sweden) Patricia Berghult	—N/a	(United States) Chevelle Hallback	(United States) Maricela Cornejo	(Sweden) Mikaela Laurén	—N/a	(Mexico) Cinthia Lozano
8	(Mexico) Alma Ibarra	—N/a	vacant	(Australia) Kylie Hutt	(South Africa) Noni Tenge	—N/a	(United States) Logan Holler
9	(Dominican Republic) Yenebier Guillén	—N/a	vacant	vacant	vacant	—N/a	(Turkey) Dilara Yücel
10	(Serbia) Éva Bajić	—N/a	vacant	vacant	vacant	—N/a	(Sweden) Marianne Ahlborg

=== Welterweight ===
Rank	BoxRec	The Ring	WBA	WBC	IBF	WBO	IBO
C	—N/a	(United States) Jessica McCaskill	(United States) Jessica McCaskill	(United States) Jessica McCaskill	(United States) Jessica McCaskill	(United States) Jessica McCaskill	(United States) Jessica McCaskill
1	(United States) Jessica McCaskill	(Norway) Cecilia Brækhus	(Switzerland) Ornella Domini	(United States) Layla McCarter	(Norway) Cecilia Brækhus	—N/a	(Norway) Cecilia Brækhus
2	(United Kingdom) Sandy Ryan	(United States) Layla McCarter	(Mexico) Alma Ibarra	(Croatia) Ivana Habazin	(Switzerland) Ornella Domini	—N/a	(Poland) Ewa Piątkowska
3	(United States) Mary McGee	(Switzerland) Ornella Domini	(United States) Layla McCarter	(United Kingdom) Hannah Rankin	(United States) Kali Reis	—N/a	(United States) Layla McCarter
4	(Croatia) Ivana Habazin	(Argentina) Victoria Bustos	(Norway) Cecilia Brækhus	(Norway) Cecilia Brækhus	(United States) Chevelle Hallback	—N/a	(Mexico) Alma Ibarra
5	(Puerto Rico) Stephanie Aquino	(Zambia) Lolita Muzeya	(Venezuela) Ogleidis Suárez	(Germany) Verena Kaiser	(Germany) Verena Kaiser	—N/a	(Zambia) Lolita Muzeya
6	(Canada) Marie Houle	—N/a	(United States) Chevelle Hallback	(Zambia) Lolita Muzeya	(Venezuela) Ogleidis Suárez	—N/a	(United States) Chevelle Hallback
7	(Australia) Diana Prazak	—N/a	(Germany) Jessica Schadko	(United States) Aleksandra Magdziak	(Australia) Kylie Hutt	—N/a	(Switzerland) Olivia Belkacem
8	(Canada) Kandi Wyatt	—N/a	(France) Oshin Derieuw	(Switzerland) Ornella Domini	vacant	—N/a	(New Zealand) Gentiane Lupi
9	(Wales) Lauren Price	—N/a	(Zambia) Lolita Muzeya	(Russia) Inna Sagaydakovskaya	vacant	—N/a	(United States) Summer Lynn
10	(Argentina) Lucia Perez	—N/a	(Germany) Verena Kaiser	(Republic of Ireland) Katelynn Phelan	vacant	—N/a	(New Zealand) Karen Te Ruki Pasene

=== Light welterweight ===
Rank	BoxRec	The Ring	WBA	WBC	IBF	WBO	IBO
C	—N/a	(United Kingdom) Chantelle Cameron	(United States) Kali Reis	(United Kingdom) Chantelle Cameron	(United Kingdom) Chantelle Cameron	(United States) Kali Reis	(United States) Kali Reis
1	(United Kingdom) Chantelle Cameron	(United Kingdom) Chantelle Cameron	(Haiti) Melissa St. Vil	(United States) Mary McGee	(Argentina) Victoria Bustos	—N/a	(Argentina) Anahí Ester Sánchez
2	(United States) Mary McGee	(United States) Mary McGee	(Spain) Miriam Gutiérrez	(United States) Kali Reis	(Belgium) Oshin Derieuw	—N/a	(Australia) Diana Prazak
3	(Greece) Christina Linardatou	(Argentina) Érica Farías	(Poland) Ewa Piątkowska	(Kenya) Judy Waguthii	(Italy) Silvia Bortot	—N/a	(Canada) Jessica Camara
4	(Argentina) Victoria Bustos	(United States) Kali Reis	(Australia) Diana Prazak	(Belgium) Oshin Derieuw	(United States) Layla McCarter	—N/a	(Brazil) Rose Volante
5	(Australia) Deanha Hobbs	(Argentina) Anahí Ester Sánchez	(Argentina) Victoria Bustos	(Greece) Christina Linardatou	(Poland) Ewa Piątkowska	—N/a	(Australia) Deanha Hobbs
6	(Brazil) Adriana Araújo	—N/a	(Argentina) Yanina Del Carmen Lescano	(Argentina) Victoria Bustos	(Venezuela) Gelen Flores	—N/a	(Argentina) Victoria Bustos
7	(Argentina) Ana Laura Esteche	—N/a	(Venezuela) Gelen Flores	(Argentina) Ana Laura Esteche	(Argentina) Ana Laura Esteche	—N/a	(Brazil) Adriana Araújo
8	(Argentina) Anahí Ester Sánchez	—N/a	(Republic of Ireland) Katelynn Phelan	(Brazil) Adriana Araújo	vacant	—N/a	(Puerto Rico) Melissa Hernández
9	(United States) Kali Reis	—N/a	(South Africa) Hedda Wolmarans	(Argentina) Anahí Ester Sánchez	vacant	—N/a	(Belgium) Oshin Derieuw
10	(Poland) Ewa Piątkowska	—N/a	(Puerto Rico) Melissa Hernández	(Puerto Rico) Melissa Hernández	vacant	—N/a	(Canada) Kandi Wyatt

=== Lightweight ===
Rank	BoxRec	The Ring	WBA	WBC	IBF	WBO	IBO
C	—N/a	(Republic of Ireland) Katie Taylor	(Republic of Ireland) Katie Taylor	(Republic of Ireland) Katie Taylor	(Republic of Ireland) Katie Taylor	(United Kingdom) Rhiannon Dixon	(France) Estelle Mossely
1	(Republic of Ireland) Katie Taylor	(Belgium) Delfine Persoon	(Kazakhstan) Firuza Sharipova	(Belgium) Delfine Persoon	(United States) Jennifer Han	—N/a	(United Kingdom) Natasha Jonas
2	(Argentina) Yanina Del Carmen Lescano	(France) Estelle Mossely	(Uruguay) Maira Moneo	(France) Estelle Mossely	(France) Estelle Mossely	—N/a	(Haiti) Melissa St. Vil
3	(France) Estelle Mossely	(Spain) Miriam Gutiérrez	(Belgium) Delfine Persoon	(Germany) Nicole Wesner	(Uruguay) Maira Moneo	—N/a	(Argentina) Yanina Del Carmen Lescano
4	(United Kingdom) Natasha Jonas	(United Kingdom) Natasha Jonas	(France) Estelle Mossely	(Brazil) Rose Volante	(Germany) Nicole Wesner	—N/a	(United States) Jennifer Han
5	(Uruguay) Maira Moneo	(United States) Jennifer Han	(United Kingdom) Natasha Jonas	(United States) Selina Barrios	(Haiti) Melissa St. Vil	—N/a	(Serbia) Jelena Janićijević
6	(Haiti) Melissa St. Vil	—N/a	(Germany) Beke Bas	(Spain) Miriam Gutiérrez	(Kazakhstan) Firuza Sharipova	—N/a	(Poland) Oleksandra Sidorenko
7	(United States) Jennifer Han	—N/a	(Poland) Oleksandra Sidorenko	(Russia) Sofya Ochigava	(France) Myriam Dellal	—N/a	(Germany) Verena Kaiser
8	(Argentina) Yamila Belen Abellaneda	—N/a	(Canada) Jessica Camara	(France) Victoire Piteau	(Germany) Beke Bas	—N/a	(United States) Heather Hardy
9	(France) Myriam Dellal	—N/a	(Germany) Ramona Kühne	(Canada) Jessica Camara	(Germany) Ikram Kerwat	—N/a	(Spain) Miriam Gutiérrez
10	(Argentina) Paola Pamela Benavidez	—N/a	(Argentina) Yamila Belen Abellaneda	(Democratic Republic of the Congo) Naomie Yumba Thérèse	(Belgium) Djemilla Gontaruk	—N/a	(Uruguay) Maira Moneo

=== Super featherweight ===
Rank	BoxRec	The Ring	WBA	WBC	IBF	WBO	IBO
C	—N/a	(United States) Alycia Baumgardner	(United States) Alycia Baumgardner	(United States) Alycia Baumgardner	(United States) Alycia Baumgardner	(United States) Alycia Baumgardner	(United States) Alycia Baumgardner
1	(Belgium) Delfine Persoon	(United States) Mikaela Mayer	(France) Elhem Mekhaled	(United States) Mikaela Mayer	(Germany) Ramona Kühne	—N/a	(Argentina) Érica Farías
2	(United Kingdom) Terri Harper	(United Kingdom) Terri Harper	(United States) Alycia Baumgardner	(United Kingdom) Natasha Jonas	(Australia) Lauryn Eagle	—N/a	(Kenya) Fatuma Zarika
3	(United States) Mikaela Mayer	(France) Maïva Hamadouche	(Australia) Lauryn Eagle	(France) Elhem Mekhaled	(France) Licia Boudersa	—N/a	(Poland) Ewa Brodnicka
4	(France) Maïva Hamadouche	(South Korea) Choi Hyun-mi	(United States) Ayanna Vasquez	(France) Maïva Hamadouche	(United Kingdom) Natasha Jonas	—N/a	(United States) Alycia Baumgardner
5	(Kenya) Fatuma Zarika	(Poland) Ewa Brodnicka	(United States) Ronica Jeffrey	(Finland) Eva Wahlström	(Finland) Eva Wahlström	—N/a	(South Africa) Nozipho Bell
6	(Finland) Eva Wahlström	—N/a	(United States) Tiara Brown	(Norway) Katharina Thanderz	(Argentina) Yanina Del Carmen Lescano	—N/a	(Norway) Katharina Thanderz
7	(Poland) Ewa Brodnicka	—N/a	(Finland) Eva Wahlström	(South Korea) Choi Hyun-mi	(Brazil) Viviane Obenauf	—N/a	(Mexico) Karla Zamora
8	(United States) Alycia Baumgardner	—N/a	(France) Victoire Piteau	(Greece) Kallia Kourouni	(Russia) Sofya Ochigava	—N/a	(Argentina) Carolina Duer
9	(United States) Tiara Brown	—N/a	(France) Rima Ayadi	(Haiti) Melissa St. Vil	(United States) Ayanna Vasquez	—N/a	(France) Elhem Mekhaled
10	(Nigeria) Helen Joseph	—N/a	(Mexico) Yolanda Vega	(United States) Ronica Jeffrey	(Argentina) Ana Güichapani	—N/a	(Kazakhstan) Firuza Sharipova

=== Featherweight ===
Rank	BoxRec	The Ring	WBA	WBC	IBF	WBO	IBO
C	—N/a	vacant	(Puerto Rico) Amanda Serrano	(United States) Tiara Brown	(Puerto Rico) Amanda Serrano	(Puerto Rico) Amanda Serrano	(Puerto Rico) Amanda Serrano
1	(Puerto Rico) Amanda Serrano	(Puerto Rico) Amanda Serrano	(France) Licia Boudersa	(Germany) Nina Meinke	(Germany) Nina Meinke	—N/a	(Argentina) Daniela Romina Bermúdez
2	(Denmark) Sarah Mahfoud	(Denmark) Sarah Mahfoud	(Canada) Jelena Mrdjenovich	(Mexico) Erika Cruz	(United States) Tiara Brown	—N/a	(Canada) Jelena Mrdjenovich
3	(Mexico) Erika Cruz	(Mexico) Erika Cruz	(Germany) Nina Meinke	(Mexico) Melissa Esquivel	(United States) Shelly Vincent	—N/a	(Germany) Nina Meinke
4	(Mexico) Melissa Esquivel	(Canada) Jelena Mrdjenovich	(Dominican Republic) Dyana Vargas	(United States) Shelly Vincent	(United States) Heather Hardy	—N/a	(Sweden) Lucy Wildheart
5	(Argentina) Brenda Carabajal	(Germany) Nina Meinke	(Mexico) Melissa Esquivel	(Denmark) Sarah Mahfoud	(Argentina) Brenda Carabajal	—N/a	(France) Licia Boudersa
6	(Germany) Nina Meinke	—N/a	(Germany) Elina Tissen	(Mexico) Yareli Larios	(Argentina) Edith Soledad Matthysse	—N/a	(Argentina) Edith Soledad Matthysse
7	(Canada) Jelena Mrdjenovich	—N/a	(Sweden) Lucy Wildheart	(United States) Heather Hardy	(Russia) Elena Gradinar	—N/a	(Japan) Wakako Fujiwara
8	(France) Licia Boudersa	—N/a	(Spain) Jennifer Miranda	(Canada) Jelena Mrdjenovich	(Argentina) Alejandra Soledad Zamora	—N/a	(Brazil) Danila Ramos
9	(Russia) Elena Gradinar	—N/a	(Russia) Elena Gradinar	(Argentina) Mayra Alejandra Gómez	(Italy) Vissia Trovato	—N/a	(Argentina) Laura Griffa
10	(Bolivia) Lizbeth Crespo	—N/a	(Germany) Sophie Alisch	(United States) Alycia Baumgardner	vacant	—N/a	(Germany) Elina Tissen

=== Super bantamweight ===
Rank	BoxRec	The Ring	WBA	WBC	IBF	WBO	IBO
C	—N/a	vacant	(Venezuela) Mayerlin Rivas	(Mexico) Yamileth Mercado	(Australia) Cherneka Johnson	(France) Ségolène Lefebvre	vacant
1	(Argentina) Daniela Romina Bermúdez	(Mexico) Jackie Nava	(Argentina) Nazarena Romero (I)	(Mexico) Jackie Nava	(United Kingdom) Ellie Scotney	—N/a	(Spain) Mary Romero
2	(Mexico) Yamileth Mercado	(Denmark) Dina Thorslund	(Australia) April Adams	(France) Ségolène Lefebvre	(Mexico) Melissa Esquivel	—N/a	(Mexico) Jackie Nava
3	(Venezuela) Mayerlin Rivas	(Mexico) Yamileth Mercado	(Russia) Fatima Dudieva	(United States) Angelica Rascon	(United States) Maureen Shea	—N/a	(Argentina) Nazarena Romero
4	(Mexico) Jackie Nava	(France) Ségolène Lefebvre	(France) Ségolène Lefebvre	(Denmark) Dina Thorslund	(Spain) Mary Romero	—N/a	(Thailand) Phannarai Netisri
5	(Mexico) Mariana Juárez	(Mexico) Mariana Juárez	(Venezuela) Alys Sánchez	(Argentina) Daniela Romina Bermúdez	(United Kingdom) Shannon Courtenay	—N/a	(United States) Melissa Odessa-Parker
6	(Argentina) Nazarena Romero	—N/a	(Indonesia) Felmy Sumaehe	(Argentina) Marcela Acuña	(Argentina) Daniela Bermudez	—N/a	(Czech Republic) Nikola Hubálková
7	(France) Ségolène Lefebvre	—N/a	(Panama) Laura Ledezma	(United States) Maureen Shea	(Argentina) Carolina Duer	—N/a	(Mexico) Miriam Rosales
8	(Mexico) Melissa Esquivel	—N/a	(Colombia) Liliana Palmera	(United States) Melissa Odessa-Parker	(Mexico) Julissa Guzman	—N/a	(Germany) Lara Ochmann
9	(United Kingdom) Rachel Ball	—N/a	(United States) Jamie Mitchell	(Kenya) Fatuma Zarika	vacant	—N/a	(Italy) Maria Cecchi
10	(Australia) April Adams	—N/a	(Argentina) Sabrina Perez	(Mexico) Melissa Esquivel	vacant	—N/a	(Serbia) Maja Milenković

=== Bantamweight ===
Rank	BoxRec	The Ring	WBA	WBC	IBF	WBO	IBO
C	—N/a	vacant	(United Kingdom) |Nina Hughes	(Mexico) Yulihan Luna	(Australia) Ebanie Bridges	(Denmark) Dina Thorslund	(United States) Melissa Odessa-Parker
1	(Denmark) Dina Thorslund	(Mexico) Zulina Muñoz	(Australia) Shannon O'Connell	(Argentina) María Cecilia Román	(Australia) Shannon O'Connell	—N/a	(Australia) Shannon O'Connell
2	(Mexico) Yulihan Luna	(Mexico) Yulihan Luna	(Mexico) Zulina Muñoz	(Argentina) Vanesa Lorena Taborda	(United States) Melissa Parker	—N/a	(Venezuela) Jasneili Hernández
3	(Mexico) Zulina Muñoz	(Mexico) Mariana Juárez	(United States) Rosalinda Rodriguez	(Mexico) Zulina Muñoz	(Malawi) Ellen Simwaka	—N/a	(Spain) Melania Sorroche
4	(Mexico) Paulette Valenzuela	Nina Hughes	(United States) Maureen Shea	(Mexico) Mariana Juárez	(Argentina) Juliana Basualdo	—N/a	(United Kingdom) Rachel Ball
5	(Australia) Shannon O'Connell	(Denmark) Dina Thorslund	(Venezuela) Diana Rodriguez	(United Kingdom) Shannon Courtenay	(United States) Ava Knight	—N/a	(Russia) Fatima Dudieva
6	(United Kingdom) Shannon Courtenay	—N/a	(Australia) Ebanie Bridges	(Australia) Shannon O'Connell	(Mexico) Zulina Munoz	—N/a	(Australia) Cherneka Johnson
7	(United States) Melissa Odessa-Parker	—N/a	(Spain) Mary Romero	(Australia) Ebanie Bridges	(Argentina) Maria Cecilia Roman	—N/a	(Serbia) Saida Bukvić
8	(Argentina) María Cecilia Román	—N/a	(Serbia) Saida Bukvić	(Austria) Eva Voraberger	(Russia) Futima Dudieva	—N/a	(Mexico) Jasseth Noriega
9	(Russia) Tatyana Zrazhevskaya	—N/a	(United States) Melissa Odessa-Parker	(Mexico) Jessica González	(United States) Rosalinda Rodriguez	—N/a	(Mexico) Mariana Juárez
10	(Australia) Cherneka Johnson	—N/a	(Australia) Cherneka Johnson	(United States) Rosalinda Rodriguez	(Argentina) Florencia Ayelin Juarez	—N/a	(Venezuela) Diana Rodriguez

=== Super flyweight ===
Rank	BoxRec	The Ring	WBA	WBC	IBF	WBO	IBO
C	—N/a	vacant	(Mexico) Maribel Ramírez	(Mexico) Lourdes Juárez	(Argentina) Micaela Luján	(Japan) Miyo Yoshida	vacant
1	(Mexico) Lourdes Juárez	(Mexico) Lourdes Juárez	(Mexico) Victoria Torres	(Mexico) Diana Fernandez	(Argentina) Débora Dionicius	—N/a	(Mexico) Diana Fernandez
2	(Mexico) Jessica Chávez	(Mexico) Guadalupe Martínez Guzmán	(Colombia) Olga Julio	(Mexico) Guadalupe Martínez Guzmán	(Australia) Susie Ramadan	—N/a	(Mexico) Guadalupe Martínez Guzmán
3	(Mexico) Guadalupe Martínez Guzmán	(Mexico) Jessica Chávez	(Panama) Yaditza Pérez	(Mexico) Jasseth Noriega	(Chile) Daniela Asenjo	—N/a	(South Korea) Yuh Hee-jung
4	(Mexico) Diana Fernandez	(Mexico) Diana Fernandez	(United States) Jasmine Artiga	(South Korea) Yuh Hee-jung	(Japan) Terumi Nuki	—N/a	(Colombia) Daniris Garcia
5	(Mexico) Arely Muciño	(United States) Adelaida Ruiz	(United States) Czarina McCoy	(United States) Tyrieshia Douglas	(Mexico) Diana Fernandez	—N/a	(Mexico) Victoria Torres
6	(United States) Adelaida Ruiz	—N/a	(South Korea) Yuh Hee-jung	(United States) Christina Ruiz	(Spain) Eva Naranjo	—N/a	(Thailand) Chisakan Ariphipat
7	(Mexico) Victoria Torres	—N/a	(Panama) Nataly Delgado	(Argentina) Micaela Luján	(Mexico) Zulina Muñoz	—N/a	(United States) Jasmine Artiga
8	(Japan) Miyo Yoshida	—N/a	(Bolivia) Carla Campos	(Mexico) Estrella Valverde	(Mexico) Karina Fernández	—N/a	(Mexico) Arely Muciño
9	(Argentina) Micaela Luján	—N/a	(United States) Gabriela Fundora	(Australia) Susie Ramadan	vacant	—N/a	(Japan) Miyo Yoshida
10	(Mexico) Jaqueline Munoz	—N/a	(Russia) Sofia Abraamyan	(Mexico) Maribel Ramírez	vacant	—N/a	(Bolivia) Carla Campos

=== Flyweight ===
Rank	BoxRec	The Ring	WBA	WBC	IBF	WBO	IBO
C	—N/a	(United States) Marlen Esparza	(United States) Marlen Esparza	(United States) Marlen Esparza	(Argentina) Leonela Paola Yúdica	(Argentina) Gabriela Alaniz	(Mexico) Gloria Gallardo
1	(United States) Marlen Esparza	(United States) Marlen Esparza	(Venezuela) Eva Guzman	(Mexico) Ibeth Zamora Silva	(Mexico) María Salinas	—N/a	(Argentina) Gabriela Alaniz
2	(Mexico) Ibeth Zamora Silva	(Mexico) Arely Muciño	(Argentina) Gabriela Alaniz	(Mexico) Jacky Calvo	(Argentina) Gabriela Alaniz	—N/a	(Mexico) María Salinas
3	(Mexico) Sandra Robles	(Japan) Naoko Fujioka	(Mexico) Isabel Millan	(Japan) Naoko Fujioka	(Mexico) Gloria Gallardo	—N/a	(Mexico) Asley González
4	(Argentina) Débora Anahí López	(Mexico) Ibeth Zamora Silva	(Venezuela) Niorkis Carreno	(Argentina) Débora Anahí López	(Mexico) Isabel Millan	—N/a	(Mexico) Marilyn Badillo
5	(Argentina) Gabriela Alaniz	(Mexico) Jessica Nery Plata	(Argentina) Jennifer Meza	(United States) Ava Knight	(Mexico) Irma Sánchez	—N/a	(Mexico) Cecilia Rodríguez
6	(Mexico) María Salinas	—N/a	(Italy) Valentina Milazzo	(Mexico) María Salinas	(Venezuela) Leiryn Flores	—N/a	(Colombia) Olga Julio
7	(Mexico) Gabriela Sánchez	—N/a	(Venezuela) Yoselin Fernández	(Argentina) Leonela Paola Yúdica	(United States) Marlen Esparza	—N/a	(Venezuela) Niorkis Carreno
8	(Mexico) Asley González	—N/a	(Mexico) Sulem Urbina	(Mexico) Jessica Chávez	(France) Laetitia Arzalier	—N/a	(Mexico) Isabel Millan
9	(Venezuela) Eva Guzman	—N/a	(Mexico) María Salinas	(Poland) Ewelina Pękalska	vacant	—N/a	(Bolivia) Mariela Ribera Valverde
10	(Mexico) Sulem Urbina	—N/a	(United States) Natalie Gonzalez	(Mexico) Isabel Millan	vacant	—N/a	(Netherlands) Alicia Holzken

=== Light flyweight ===
Rank	BoxRec	The Ring	WBA	WBC	IBF	WBO	IBO
C	—N/a	vacant	(Argentina) Yésica Bopp	(Mexico) Yesenia Gómez	(Argentina) Evelyn Nazarena Bermúdez	(United States) Seniesa Estrada	vacant
1	(Mexico) Kenia Enríquez	(United States) Seniesa Estrada	(Mexico) Jessica Nery Plata (I)	(Canada) Kim Clavel	(Canada) Kim Clavel	—N/a	(Germany) Sarah Bormann
2	(Mexico) Jessica Nery Plata	(Argentina) Evelyn Nazarena Bermúdez	(Mexico) Anabel Ortiz	(Japan) Naoko Fujioka	(Germany) Sarah Bormann	—N/a	(Canada) Kim Clavel
3	(Japan) Tenkai Tsunami	(Canada) Kim Clavel	(Canada) Kim Clavel	(Argentina) Yésica Bopp	(Japan) Shione Ogata	—N/a	(Mexico) Kenia Enríquez
4	(Mexico) Yesenia Gómez	(Japan) Tenkai Tsunami	(Mexico) María Salinas	(Mexico) Guadalupe Bautista	(Mexico) Sandra Robles	—N/a	(Mexico) Tania Enríquez
5	(Canada) Kim Clavel	(Mexico) Tania Enríquez	(Spain) Joana Suarez	(Mexico) Gabriela Sánchez	(Mexico) Tania Enríquez	—N/a	(Venezuela) Yoselin Fernández
6	(Argentina) Evelyn Nazarena Bermúdez	—N/a	(Japan) Shione Ogata	(Mexico) Silvia Torres	(Mexico) Silvia Torres	—N/a	(Venezuela) Johana Zuniga
7	(Mexico) Tania Enríquez	—N/a	(Australia) Susie Ramadan	(Argentina) Evelyn Nazarena Bermúdez	(Venezuela) Debora Rengifo	—N/a	(Mexico) Guadalupe Bautista
8	(Mexico) Guadalupe Bautista	—N/a	(Germany) Sarah Bormann	(Japan) Tenkai Tsunami	(Mexico) Esmeralda Moreno	—N/a	(Mexico) Silvia Torres
9	(Venezuela) Debora Rengifo	—N/a	(Mexico) Asley González	(Mexico) Alondra García	vacant	—N/a	(Venezuela) Bestalia Sánchez
10	(Argentina) Ayelen Granadino	—N/a	(Mexico) Sandra Robles	(Mexico) Esmeralda Moreno	vacant	—N/a	(Mexico) Jessica Nery Plata

=== Mini flyweight ===
Rank	BoxRec	The Ring	WBA	WBC	IBF	WBO	IBO
C	—N/a	vacant	(United States) Seniesa Estrada	(Germany) Tina Rupprecht	(Costa Rica) Yokasta Valle	(Japan) Kasumi Saeki	vacant
1	(United States) Seniesa Estrada	(United States) Seniesa Estrada	(Venezuela) Bestalia Sánchez	(United States) Seniesa Estrada	(Germany) Sarah Bormann	—N/a	(Spain) Joana Pastrana
2	(Japan) Etsuko Tada	(Germany) Tina Rupprecht	(Japan) Mizuki Chimoto	(Germany) Sarah Bormann	(Vietnam) Nguyễn Thị Thu Nhi	—N/a	(Mexico) Katia Gutiérrez
3	(Mexico) Anabel Ortiz	(Costa Rica) Yokasta Valle	(Argentina) Jazmin Gala Villarino	(Peru) Rocio Gasper	(Japan) Mizuki Chimoto	—N/a	(Guatemala) Maria Micheo Santizo
4	(Costa Rica) Yokasta Valle	(Mexico) Anabel Ortiz	(Japan) Saemi Hanagata	(Vietnam) Nguyễn Thị Thu Nhi	(Argentina) Jazmin Gala Villarino	—N/a	(China) Jianping Ouyang
5	(Spain) Joana Pastrana	(Japan) Etsuko Tada	(Japan) Etsuko Tada	(Japan) Etsuko Tada	(Thailand) Ninlada Meekun	—N/a	(Mexico) Anabel Ortiz
6	(Germany) Sarah Bormann	—N/a	(Mexico) Jessica Basulto	(Japan) Yuko Kuroki	(Mexico) Jessica Basulto	—N/a	(Japan) Umi Ishikawa
7	(Japan) Ayaka Miyao	—N/a	(Guatemala) Maria Micheo Santizo	(China) Cai Zhong Ju	(Mexico) Katia Gutiérrez	—N/a	(Mexico) Blanca Torres Cano
8	(Japan) Mizuki Chimoto	—N/a	(Mexico) Katia Gutiérrez	(Japan) Yuko Kuroki	(Japan) Etsuko Tada	—N/a	(Mexico) Judith Vivanco
9	(Japan) Yuko Kuroki	—N/a	(Venezuela) Maria Milano	(Guatemala) Maria Micheo Santizo	(Mexico) Elizabeth Lopez	—N/a	(Mexico) Maria Soledad Vargas
10	(Mexico) Maria Soledad Vargas	—N/a	(Mexico) Naomi Arellano Reyes	(Mexico) Ana Arrazola	(Mexico) Anabel Ortiz	—N/a	(Venezuela) Eva Guzman

=== Atomweight ===
Rank	BoxRec	The Ring	WBA	WBC	IBF	WBO	IBO
C	—N/a	vacant	(Mexico) Monserrat Alarcón	(Czech Republic) Fabiana Bytyqi	(Japan) Saemi Hanagata	(Japan) Mika Iwakawa	—N/a
1	(Mexico) Monserrat Alarcón	(Mexico) Monserrat Alarcón	(Japan) Eri Matsuda	(Mexico) Maria Soledad Vargas	(Venezuela) Eva Guzman	—N/a	—N/a
2	(Japan) Ayaka Miyao	(Czech Republic) Fabiana Bytyqi	(Venezuela) Yenifer León	(Japan) Mika Iwakawa	(Japan) Ayaka Miyao	—N/a	—N/a
3	(Japan) Eri Matsuda	(Japan) Mika Iwakawa	(Japan) Kaori Nagai	(Japan) Saemi Hanagata	(Japan) Kaori Nagai	—N/a	—N/a
4	(Japan) Nanae Suzuki	(Japan) Eri Matsuda	(Japan) Ayaka Miyao	(Japan) Eri Matsuda	(Mexico) Maria Soledad Vargas	—N/a	—N/a
5	(Japan) Mika Iwakawa	(Venezuela) Yenifer León	(Mexico) Gabriela Sánchez	(Mexico) Monserrat Alarcón	(Japan) Nao Ikeyama	—N/a	—N/a
6	(Czech Republic) Fabiana Bytyqi	—N/a	(Mexico) Silvia Torres	(United States) Lorraine Villalobos	(Japan) Eri Matsuda	—N/a	—N/a
7	(Venezuela) Yenifer León	—N/a	vacant	(Japan) Ayaka Miyao	vacant	—N/a	—N/a
8	(Mexico) Abril Sánchez Torres	—N/a	vacant	(Japan) Umi Ishikawa	vacant	—N/a	—N/a
9	(Japan) Sumire Yamanaka	—N/a	vacant	(Bulgaria) Teodora Bacheva	vacant	—N/a	—N/a
10	(Japan) Yurie Kishi	—N/a	vacant	(Japan) Nao Ikeyama	vacant	—N/a	—N/a

== See also ==
- List of current female world boxing champions
