= List of IBO female world champions =

The following is a list of IBO female world champions certificated by the International Boxing Organization (IBO).

Stand: June 25, 2022.

^{r} – Champion relinquished title.
^{s} – Champion stripped of title.

== Minimumweight ==
No.	Name	Duration of reign	Defences
1	(China) Cai Zongju	June 9, 2018 — 2018^{s}	0
2	(Germany) Sarah Bormann	May 21, 2022 — present	0

== Light flyweight ==
No.	Name	Duration of reign	Defences
1	vacant		0

== Flyweight ==
No.	Name	Duration of reign	Defences
1	(Serbia) Nina Radovanović	December 8, 2018 — 2019^{s}	0
2	(Mexico) Gloria Gallardo	November 22, 2019 — 2021^{s}	0

== Super flyweight ==
No.	Name	Duration of reign	Defences
1	(Austria) Eva Voraberger	September 27, 2015 — April 30, 2016	0
2	(Mexico) Esmeralda Moreno	April 30, 2016 — 2016^{s}	0
3	(Austria) Eva Voraberger (2)	October 22, 2016 — 2017^{s}	0
4	(Chile) Daniela Asenjo	June 7, 2022 — 2024^{s}	1
5	(Kazakhstan) Angelina Lukas	October 6, 2024 — June 2025^{r}	1

== Bantamweight ==
No.	Name	Duration of reign	Defences
1	(South Africa) Sharadene Fortuin	August 28, 2015 — 2016^{s}	0
2	(United States) Melissa Oddessa Parker	June 19, 2021 — present	1

== Super bantamweight ==
No.	Name	Duration of reign	Defences
1	(Italy) Vissia Trovato	November 5, 2016 — 2017^{s}	0
2	(France) Ségolène Lefebvre	April 12, 2019 — 2019^{r}	0
3	(New Zealand) Mea Motu	April 27, 2023 — January 25, 2025	2
4	(United Kingdom) Ellie Scotney	January 25, 2025 — 2025^{r}	0
5	(Poland) Laura Grzyb	March 15, 2026 — present	0

== Featherweight ==
No.	Name	Duration of reign	Defences
1	(Poland) Iwona Guzowska	September 18, 1999 — 2002^{s}	3
2	(France) Licia Boudersa	September 28, 2019 — March 2021^{s}	0
3	(Puerto Rico) Amanda Serrano	March 25, 2021 — present	1

== Super featherweight ==
No.	Name	Duration of reign	Defences
1	(Kazakhstan) Firuza Sharipova	December 30, 2017 — 2019^{s}	0
2	(United Kingdom) Terri Harper	July 19, 2019 — November 13, 2021	4
3	(United States) Alycia Baumgardner	November 13, 2021 — present	1

== Lightweight ==
No.	Name	Duration of reign	Defences
1	(United Kingdom) Chantelle Cameron	December 2, 2017 — 2019^{s}	2
2	(France) Estelle Yoka Mossely	June 14, 2019 — 2023^{r}	4
3	(United Kingdom) Caroline Dubois	September 30, 2023 — 2025^{r}	3
4	(Italy) Pamela Noutcho Sawa	November 7, 2025 — present	0

== Super lightweight ==
No.	Name	Duration of reign	Defences
1	(Netherlands) Lucia Rijker	September 25, 1998 — 1999^{s}	0
2	(Poland) Agnieszka Rylik	April 10, 2004 — 2005^{s}	0
3	(Zambia) Esther Phiri	January 29, 2011 — 2013^{s}	1
4	(Russia) Svetlana Kulakova	December 3, 2016 — 2019^{s}	1
5	(United States) Kali Reis	August 20, 2021 — August 16, 2022^{s}	1
5	(United Kingdom) Chantelle Cameron	May 20, 2023 — November 25, 2023	0
5	(Republic of Ireland) Katie Taylor	November 25, 2023 — 2025^{r}	2
6	(France) Flora Pili	December 20, 2025 — September 5, 2026	0
7	(Republic of Ireland) Katie Taylor	September 5, 2026 — present	0

== Welterweight ==
No.	Name	Duration of reign	Defences
1	(Germany) Jennifer Retzke	August 3, 2014 — November 29, 2014	0
2	(Norway) Cecilia Braekhus	November 29, 2014 — August 15, 2020	9
3	(United States) Jessica McCaskill	August 15, 2020 — present	3

== Super welterweight ==
No.	Name	Duration of reign	Defences
1	(Sweden) Mikaela Laurén	April 21, 2018 — 2018^{r}	0
2	(United Kingdom) Hannah Rankin	June 15, 2019 — November 27, 2019	0
3	(Sweden) Patricia Berghult	November 27, 2019 — 2021^{s}	0
4	(United Kingdom) Hannah Rankin (2)	November 5, 2021 — September 24, 2022^{s}	1
5	(United Kingdom) Terri Harper	September 24, 2022 — present	0

== Middleweight ==
No.	Name	Duration of reign	Defences
1	(Croatia) Ivana Habazin	March 16, 2018 — 2019^{s}	1

== Super middleweight ==
No.	Name	Duration of reign	Defences
1	vacant		0

== Light heavyweight ==
No.	Name	Duration of reign	Defences
1	vacant		0

== Heavyweight ==
No.	Name	Duration of reign	Defences
1	(United States) Sonya Lamonakis	December 6, 2014 — 2015^{s}	0

== See also ==
- International Boxing Organization
- List of IBO world champions
