= Firuza Sharipova =

Female boxer from Kazakhstan

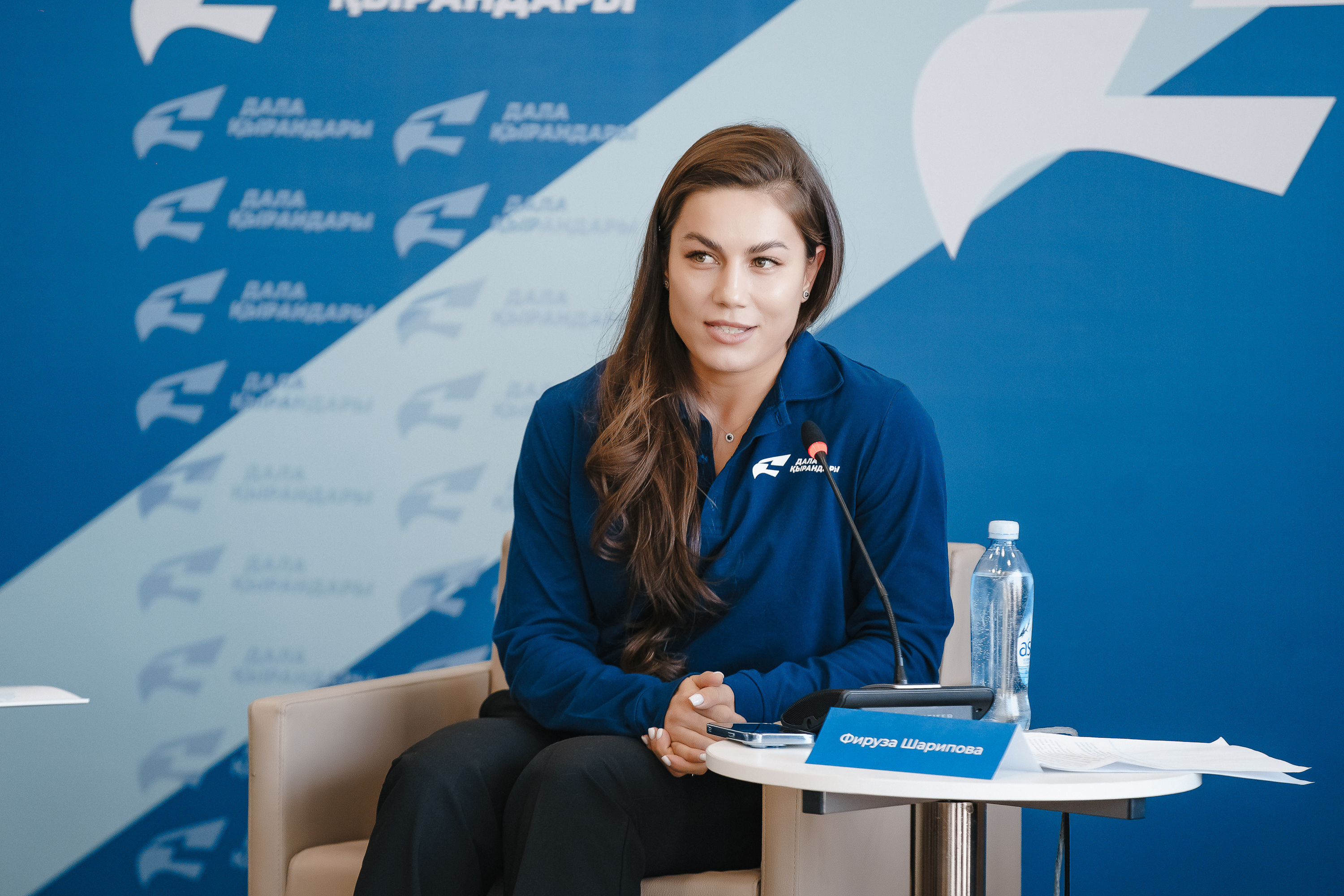
- Firuza Sharipova

Personal information
- Nationality: Kazakhstani
- Born: Фируза Шарипова; August 29, 1994 (age 32) Taraz (Zhambyl), Kazakhstan
- Height: 166 cm (5 ft 5 1/2 in)
- Weight: Super-featherweight; Lightweight; Light-welterweight

Boxing career
- Reach: 166 cm (65 in)
- Stance: Orthodox

Boxing record
- Total fights: 17
- Wins: 15
- Win by KO: 8
- Losses: 2
Medal record
Women's amateur boxing
National Championships
Gold medal – first place	2012 Kazakhstan	Light welterweight
Gold medal – first place	2013 Kazakhstan	Lightweight
Silver medal – second place	2014 Kazakhstan	Lightweight
Bronze medal – third place	2016 Kazakhstan	Lightweight
Representing Kazakhstan
Asian Championships
Bronze medal – third place	2012 Mongolia	Light welterweight

Firuza Sharipova (born 29 August 1994) is a Kazakhstani professional boxer who held the WIBA lightweight title in 2019. As of November 2022, she was ranked number eleven in the world by the WBA.

== Amateur boxing career ==
Sharipova made her amateur boxing debut on 14 September 2011 where she was victorious against Mukasheva in Nur-Sultan (Astana), Kazakhstan for a quarterfinal tournament match.

=== Highlights ===
2012 Kazakh National Championships

- Finals: Defeated Aliya Abdraimova (13–8)

2012 Asian Championships

- Semifinals: Lost to Erdenesop Uyanga (13–37)

2012 World Championships

- Preliminaries (1/8): Lost to Patricia Berghult (11–24)

2013 Kazakh National Championships

- Quarterfinals: Defeated Natalya Tarasenko (19–14)
- Semifinals: Defeated Gulzhan Ubbiniyazova (10–9)
- Finals: Defeated Zura Khusainova (17–15)

2014 Kazakh National Championships

- Quarterfinals: Defeated Tansholpan Kanatayeva (TKO 2)
- Semifinals: Defeated Aliya Abdraimova (2–0)
- Finals: Lost to Gulzhan Ubbiniyazova (0–3)

2015 Kazakh National Championships

- Quarterfinals: Lost to Aliya Abdraimova (1–2)

2016 Kazakh National Championships

- Quarterfinals: Defeated Karina Ibragimova (3–0)
- Semifinals: Lost to Rimma Volosenko (1–2)

== Professional boxing career ==
=== Early career ===
Sharipova made her professional debut in 2016 in a losing effort against Sofya Ochigava by unanimous decision (UD) on 21 May 2016.

In her second professional bout she faced Angela Cannizzaro in Spain on 30 July 2016 receiving her first victory by unanimous decision.

In her third professional bout she face Milena Matovic on 24 September 2016 scoring her first technical knockout (TKO) victory.

Sharipova received her first title opportunity facing for the vacant Women's International Boxing Association (IBA) World Lightweight Championship against Milena Koleva on 26 August 2017 where Sharipova successful won by unanimous decision.

She got another title opportunity facing for both the vacant World Boxing Council (WBC) Silver Super Featherweight Championship and the vacant IBA World Super Featherweight Championship against Djemilla Gontaruk on 30 December 2017 where she won by unanimous decision.

Sharipova had earned herself another opportunity to face for the vacant IBA World Super Lightweight Championship against Happy Daudi on 22 August 2020 where she won the bout by TKO, 1:50 into the 5th round.

=== Sharipova vs. Taylor ===
Sharipova was announced to be fighting undisputed lightweight champion Katie Taylor in Liverpool on 11 December 2021 making her United Kingdom debut. Taylor retained the WBA, WBC, IBF, WBO, and The Ring female lightweight titles in a 10-round bout against Sharipova by unanimous decision.

== Professional boxing record ==
17 fights	15 wins	2 losses
By knockout	8	0
By decision	7	2

No.	Result	Record	Opponent	Type	Round, time	Date	Location	Notes
17	Win	15–2	(Tanzania) Feriche Mashaury	UD	6	23 Dec 2022	Yunost Arena, Chelyabinsk, Russia	
16	Loss	14–2	(Republic of Ireland) Katie Taylor	UD	10	11 Dec 2021	(United Kingdom) M&S Bank Arena, Liverpool, England	For WBA, WBC, IBF, WBO, and The Ring female lightweight titles
15	Win	14–1	(Russia) Liubov Beliakova	TKO	2 (6), 1:30	12 Sep 2021	Zhaksylyk Ushkempirov Martial Arts Palace, Nur-Sultan, Kazakhstan	
14	Win	13–1	(Russia) Yuliya Chernoborodova	TKO	4 (6), 0:20	3 Apr 2021	Pyramide, Kazan, Russia	
13	Win	12–1	(Serbia) Sara Marjanovic	UD	8	30 Oct 2020	Soviet Wings Sport Palace, Moscow, Russia	
12	Win	11–1	(Tanzania) Happy Daudi	TKO	5 (10), 1:50	22 Aug 2020	Pyramide, Kazan, Russia	Won vacant IBA world female super lightweight title
11	Win	10–1	(Russia) Anastasia Trisheva	TKO	3 (6), 1:00	20 Apr 2019	Floyd Mayweather Boxing Academy, Zhukovka, Russia	
10	Win	9–1	(Russia) Yuliya Kutsenko	UD	10	8 Sep 2018	Club A2, Saint Petersburg, Russia	Retained WIBA female world lightweight title
9	Win	8–1	(Belgium) Djémilla Gontaruk	UD	10	30 Dec 2017	Almaty Arena, Almaty, Kazakhstan	Won vacant WBC Silver female super feather title and vacant IBO World female super feather title
8	Win	7–1	(Bulgaria) Milena Koleva	UD	10	26 Aug 2017	EXPO 2017 Pavilion, Astana, Kazakhstan	Won vacant WIBA female world lightweight title
7	Win	6–1	(Russia) Bianka Pryashka	RTD	1 (6), 2:00	29 Jun 2017	Korston Club, Moscow, Russia	
6	Win	5–1	(Russia) Olga Zabavina	TKO	3 (10), 0:54	27 May 2017	Korston Club, Moscow, Russia	
5	Win	4–1	(Russia) Viktoriya Kotova	TKO	1 (6), 0:54	7 Apr 2017	Boxing & Gym Academy, Moscow, Russia	
4	Win	3–1	(Russia) Yuliya Chernoborodova	UD	6	4 Mar 2017	Balashikha Arena, Balashikha, Russia	
3	Win	2–1	(Serbia) Milena Matović	TKO	3 (6), 1:43	24 Sep 2016	Baluan Sholak Sports Palace, Almaty, Kazakhstan	
2	Win	1–1	(Italy) Angela Cannizzaro	UD	4	30 Jul 2016	Estadio Manolo Maciá, Santa Pola, Spain	
1	Loss	0–1	(Russia) Sofya Ochigava	UD	4	21 May 2016	Khodynka Ice Palace, Moscow, Russia	

Sporting positions
Minor world boxing titles
Vacant Title last held by Delfine Persoon	WIBA female lightweight champion 26 August 2017 – 2019	Vacant Title next held by Beatriz Aguilar
Vacant	IBO female super featherweight champion 30 December 2017 – 2019	Vacant Title next held by Terri Harper
Vacant Title last held by Melissa St. Vil	WBC Silver female super featherweight champion 30 December 2017 – 2019	Vacant Title next held by Delfine Persoon
Vacant Title last held by Holly Holm	IBA female super lightweight champion 22 August 2020 – 2021	Vacant
