= Sarah Bormann =

German boxer (born 1990)

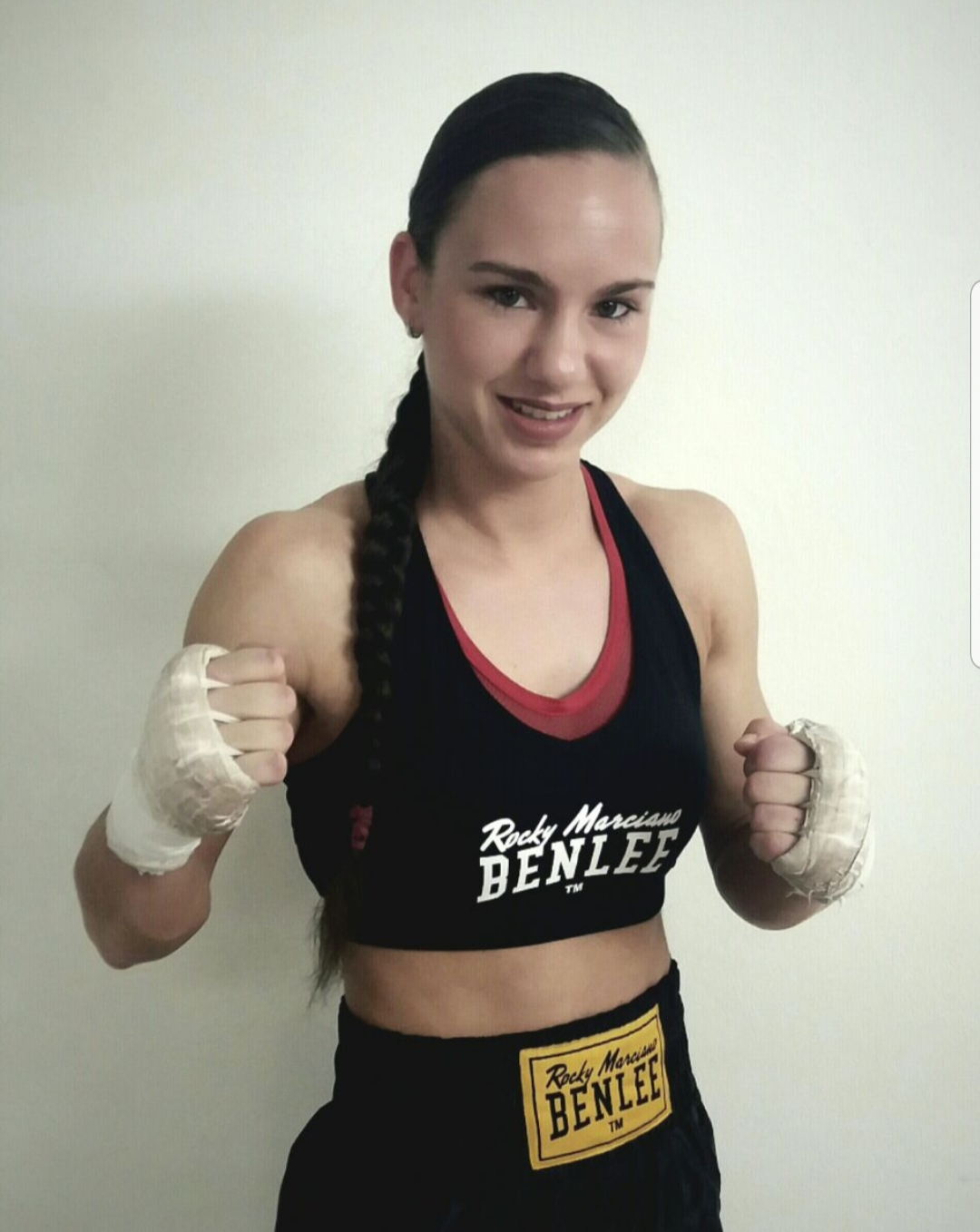

Personal information
- Nickname: Babyface
- Born: 27 April 1990 (age 36) Bad Soden-Salmünster, West Germany
- Height: 5 ft 4 in (163 cm)
- Weight: Light flyweight; Flyweight; Mini flyweight

Boxing career
- Stance: Orthodox

Boxing record
- Total fights: 23
- Wins: 22
- Win by KO: 7
- Losses: 1

Sarah Bormann (born 27 April 1990) is a German professional boxer. Bormann has been active as a professional since 2017 and has been world champion in the minimumweight and light flyweight divisions. She was previously active as an amateur in the German Boxing Association (DBV). She fought over 121 amateur fights, was a four-time German champion and boxed in the German national squad from 2010 to 2017.

== Professional career ==
Bormann made her professional debut on 15 December 2017 against Kitti Kolompar. She won that bout by TKO after just 34 seconds in the first round. Already in the 5th fight, Bormann boxed for the international German championship of the BDB (Bund Deutscher Berufsboxer e.V.) and for the Intercontinental championship of the WIBF (Women's International Boxing Federation) and GBU (Global Boxing Union).

In her 6th bout, Bormann won the WIBF and GBU light flyweight world championship.

After successful title defenses against Evgeniya Zablotskaya and Sanae Jah, Bormann also won the WBF world title against Anne-Sophie Da Costa in 2019.

After another successful title defense against Lotta Loikannen, Bormann was unable to fight for 16 months due to the COVID-19 pandemic.

In May 2021, Bormann dropped down a weight class and competed in Belgrade at minimumweight for a fight for the WBC Interim, WIBF, GBU and WBF World Championships against Catalina Diaz, which she won unanimously on points.

The WBC interim title was later changed to the Silver title due to internal disagreements between the WBC and the promoter.

Exactly one year later, in May 2022, Bormann boxed against Ana Arrazola for the WBC Silver title and the IBO minimumweight world championship. Bormann also won this fight unanimously on points, despite a heavily bleeding cut above her forehead that was inflicted on her in the third round by Arrazola's headbutt.

In September 2022, Bormann defended her WBC (World Boxing Council) Silver title unanimously on points against Elizabeth Lopez Corzo. After the fight, Bormann relinquished her IBO world title and thus got the chance in May 2023, after which she was the number one mandatory challenger at the WBC for more than two years (2021 light flyweight and 2021-2022 minimumweight). to box for the interim world title against the previously undefeated Yadira Bustillos. Bormann also won this fight unanimously on points and became interim WBC world champion. Just a month later, Bormann successfully defended her WBC title against Perla Perez. This fight was also for the IBF interim world title, as Bormann was number one in this association for more than three years in two weight classes (2019-2020 light flyweight, 2022-2023 minimum weight).

== Professional boxing record ==
23 fights	22 wins	1 loss
By knockout	7	0
By decision	15	1

No.	Result	Record	Opponent	Type	Round, time	Date	Location	Notes
23	Win	22–1	Chaima Bounouar	SD	10	2026-10-31	Messe Karlsruhe, Baden-Württemberg, Germany	Retained WBO and WBA mini-flyweight titles
22	Win	21–1	Yuko Kuroki	SD	10	2025-10-18	Sporthalle Wandsbek, Hamburg, Germany	Retained WBO mini-flyweight title; Won WBA mini-flyweight title
21	Win	20–1	Isabel Rivero	SD	10	2025-04-26	Glaspalast Sindelfingen, Sindelfingen, Germany	Retained WBO mini-flyweight title
20	Win	19–1	Jennifer Sabrina Meza	UD	10	2024-12-14	Weihnachtscirkus, Karlsruhe, Germany	Won vacant WBO mini-flyweight title
19	Win	18–1	Tamara Elisabet DeMarco	UD	10	2024-05-04	Friedrich-Ebert-Halle, Ludwigshafen, Germany	Retained IBO mini-flyweight title
18	Loss	17–1	Yesica Nery Plata	SD	10	2023-12-16	Weihnachtscirkus, Karlsruhe, Germany	For WBA and WBC light-flyweight titles
17	Win	17–0	Perla Perez Perez	UD	10	2023-06-24	Arena Ludwigsburg, Ludwigsburg, Germany	Retained Interim WBC mini-flyweight title; Won Interim IBF mini-flyweight title
16	Win	16–0	Yadira Bustillos	UD	10	2023-05-13	Stadthalle, Offenbach am Main, Germany	Won Interim WBC mini-flyweight title
15	Win	15–0	Elizabeth Lopez Corzo	UD	10	2022-09-24	Friedrich-Ebert-Halle, Ludwigshafen, Germany	Retained WBC Silver mini-flyweight title
14	Win	14–0	Ana Arrazola	UD	10	2022-05-21	Stadion am Bieberer Berg, Offenbach am Main, Germany	Retained WBC Silver mini-flyweight title; Won vacant IBO mini-flyweight title
13	Win	13–0	Catalina Diaz	UD	10	2021-05-21	Hyatt Regency, Belgrade, Serbia	Won vacant WBF, WIBF, GBU and WBC Silver mini-flyweight titles
12	Win	12–0	Lotta Loikkanen	UD	10	2019-12-14	Weihnachtscirkus, Karlsruhe, Germany	Retained WBF, WIBF and GBU light-flyweight titles
11	Win	11–0	Anne-Sophie Da Costa	UD	10	2019-05-04	Süwag Energie ARENA, Frankfurt, Germany	Retained WIBF and GBU light-flyweight titles; Won WBF light-flyweight title
10	Win	10–0	Sanae Jah	UD	10	2019-01-26	Ufgauhalle, Rheinstetten, Germany	Retained WIBF and GBU light-flyweight titles
9	Win	9–0	Evgeniya Zablotskaya	UD	10	2018-12-22	Challenge Club Arena, Offenbach am Main, Germany	Retained WIBF and GBU light-flyweight titles
8	Win	8–0	Milica Radosevic	TKO	1 (6), 0:30	2018-12-01	Altrheinhalle, Rastatt, Germany	
7	Win	7–0	Nino Gviniashvili	TKO	2 (8), 0:40	2018-11-03	Hansehalle, Lübeck, Germany	
6	Win	6–0	Oksana Romanova	UD	10	2018-06-16	Wildparkstadion, Karlsruhe, Germany	Won vacant WIBF and GBU light-flyweight titles
5	Win	5–0	Klaudia Ferenczi	TKO	7 (10), 1:56	2018-05-12	Curt Frenzel Stadium, Augsburg, Germany	Won vacant BDB International flyweight title
4	Win	4–0	Anja Jankovic	TKO	5 (6), 0:55	2018-03-31	Altrheinhalle, Plittersdorf, Germany	
3	Win	3–0	Sonja Pilipovic	TKO	2 (6), 0:21	2018-03-17	Altrheinhalle, Rastatt, Germany	
2	Win	2–0	Carina Greimel	TKO	5 (6), 1:58	2018-03-03	Ufgauhalle, Karlsruhe, Germany	
1	Win	1–0	Kitti Kolompar	TKO	1 (6), 0:34	2017-12-15	Tagungszentrum, Furth im Wald, Germany	

== See also ==
- List of female boxers

Sporting positions
Regional boxing titles
New title	BDB International flyweight champion 12 May 2018 – 16 June 2018; Won Minor world titles	Vacant
Vacant Title last held by Katia Gutiérrez	WBC Silver mini-flyweight champion 21 May 2021 – 13 May 2023; Won interim title	Vacant Title next held by Umi Ishikawa
Minor world boxing titles
Vacant Title last held by Dan Bi Kim	WIBF light-flyweight champion 16 June 2018 – 2020; Vacated	Vacant
Vacant Title last held by Ju Hee Kim	GBU light-flyweight champion 16 June 2018 – 2020; Vacated	Vacant
Preceded by Anne-Sophie Da Costa	WBF light-flyweight champion 4 May 2019 – 2020; Vacated	Vacant
Vacant Title last held by Gretchen Abaniel	WIBF mini-flyweight champion 21 May 2021 – 2022; Vacated	Vacant
Vacant Title last held by Gretchen Abaniel	GBU mini-flyweight champion 21 May 2021 – 2022; Vacated	Vacant
Vacant Title last held by Laetitia Arzalier	WBF mini-flyweight champion 21 May 2021 – 2022; Vacated	Vacant
Vacant Title last held by Cai Zongju	IBO mini-flyweight champion 21 May 2022 – 2024; Vacated	Vacant
Major world boxing titles
Vacant Title last held by Tina Rupprecht	WBC mini-flyweight champion Interim title 13 May 2023 – 2024; Vacated	Vacant Title next held by Umi Ishikawa
New title	IBF mini-flyweight champion Interim title 24 June 2023 – 2024; Vacated	Vacant
Vacant Title last held by Seniesa Estrada	WBO mini-flyweight champion 14 December 2024 – present	Incumbent
Preceded by Yuko Kuroki	WBA mini-flyweight champion 18 October 2025 – present	Incumbent
