= Nina Meinke =

German boxer

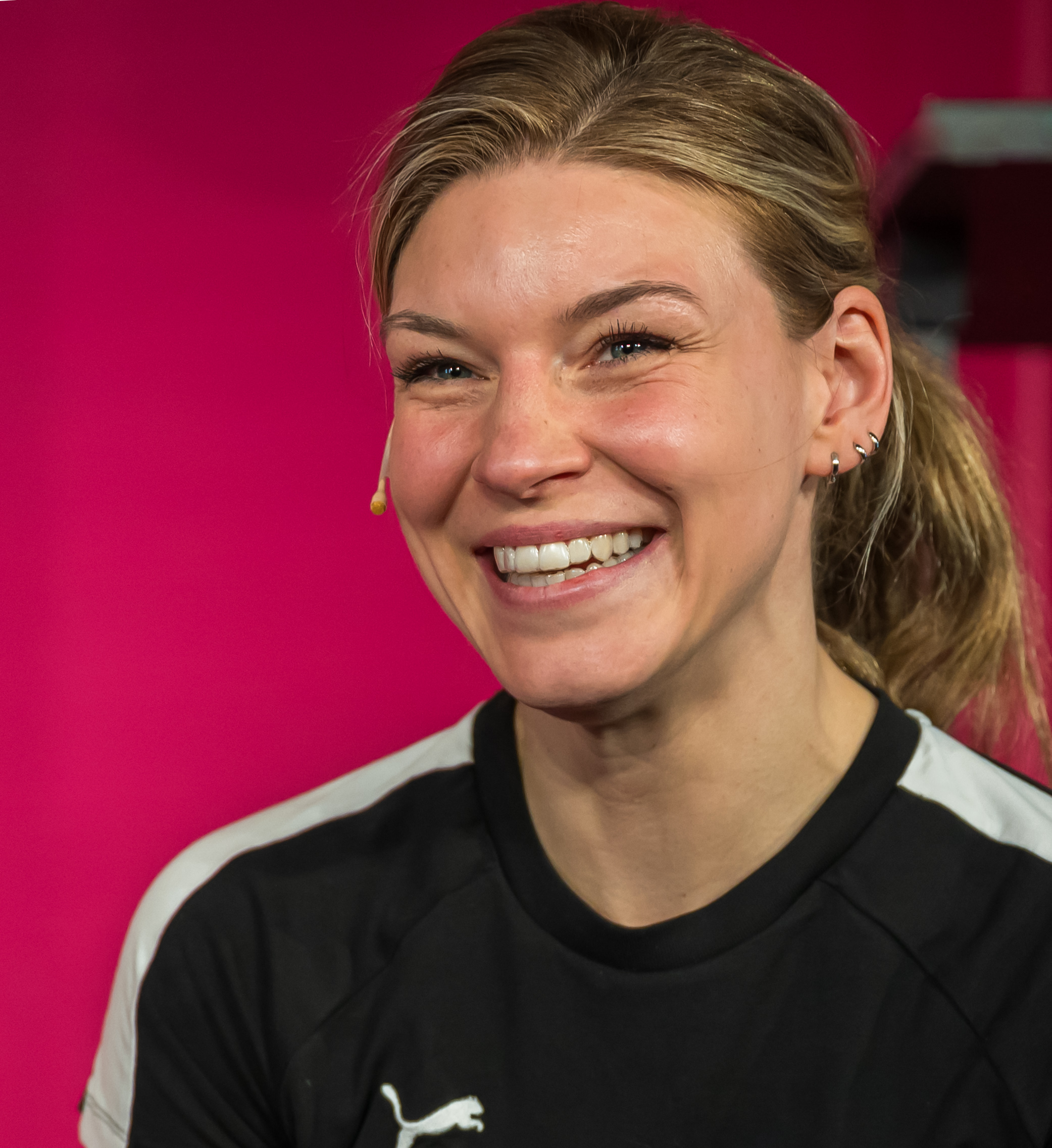
- Meinke in 2025

Personal information
- Nickname: The Brave
- Born: 4 March 1993 (age 33) Berlin, Germany
- Height: 5 ft 6 1/2 in (169 cm)
- Weight: Featherweight; Super featherweight; Lightweight

Boxing career
- Stance: Southpaw

Boxing record
- Total fights: 24
- Wins: 21
- Win by KO: 4
- Losses: 3

Nina Meinke (born 4 March 1993) is a German professional boxer. She has held IBF female featherweight title since September 2024 and the IBO female featherweight title since March 2026.

== Professional career ==
She has previously held the European female featherweight title and the WIBF featherweight title.

Meinke won the vacant IBF world female featherweight title thanks to a majority decision win over Daniela Romina Bermúdez in Hamburg, Germany, on 21 September 2024, with two ringside judges favouring Meinke 118-110 and 119-109 respectively while the third scored the fight a 114-114 draw. A rematch took place at Stadthalle in Rostock on 10 May 2025, with Meinke winning via unanimous decision this time.

On 20 March 2026, she retained her title by unanimous decision against Dyana Vargas at Fischauktionshalle Altona in Hamburg, also winning the vacant IBO female featherweight title in the process.

== Professional boxing record ==
24 fights	21 wins	3 losses
By knockout	4	1
By decision	17	2

No.	Result	Record	Opponent	Type	Round, time	Date	Location	Notes
24	Win	21–3	Dyana Vargas	UD	12	20 Mar 2026	Fischauktionshalle Altona, Hamburg, Germany	Retained IBF featherweight title; Won vacant IBO featherweight title
23	Win	20–3	Daniela Romina Bermúdez	UD	12	10 May 2025	Stadthalle, Rostock, Germany	Retained IBF featherweight title
22	Win	19–3	Daniela Romina Bermúdez	MD	12	21 Sep 2024	Sporthalle, Hamburg, Germany	Won vacant IBF featherweight title
21	Win	18–3	Laura Ledezma	UD	10	28 Oct 2023	Zenith Halle, Munich, Germany	Won vacant IBF Inter-Continental featherweight title
20	Win	17–3	Kimika Miyoshi	UD	10	24 Jun 2023	Stadthalle, Rostock, Germany	
19	Win	16–3	Angela Cannizzaro	TKO	2 (8)	25 Mar 2023	Grand Elysée, Rotherbaum, Germany	
18	Win	15–3	Edith Soledad Matthysse	UD	10	5 Nov 2022	Porsche Zentrum, Hamburg, Germany	Won vacant WIBF & GBU featherweight titles
17	Win	14–3	Karina Szmalenberg	UD	6	8 Oct 2022	Stadthalle, Falkensee, Germany	
16	Win	13–3	Eva Hubmayer	UD	6	16 Jul 2022	Maritim Hotel, Magdeburg, Germany	
15	Loss	12–3	Sarah Mahfoud	UD	10	21 Apr 2022	Frederiksberghallen, Copenhagen, Denmark	For IBF featherweight champion
14	Win	12–2	Tereza Dvorakova	UD	6	17 Apr 2021	Boxsporthalle, Hamburg, Germany	
13	Win	11–2	Angela Cannizzaro	UD	8	12 Dec 2020	Maritim Hotel, Magdeburg, Germany	
12	Win	10–2	Edina Kiss	UD	8	18 Jul 2020	Seebühne Elbauenpark, Magdeburg, Germany	
11	Win	9–2	Helene Lascombe	UD	10	13 Apr 2019	Erdgas Sportpark, Halle, Germany	Retained European featherweight title
10	Win	8–2	Lucie Sedlackova	UD	10	17 Nov 2018	Anhalt Arena, Dessau, Germany	Won vacant European featherweight title
9	Loss	7–2	Elina Tissen	SD	10	18 May 2018	MBS Arena, Potsdam, Germany	Lost WIBF featherweight title; For GBU featherweight title
8	Win	7–1	Vissia Trovato	UD	10	17 Feb 2018	MHPArena, Ludwigsburg, Germany	Won vacant WIBF featherweight title
7	Win	6–1	Grecia Nova	RTD	2 (10), 2:00	18 Nov 2017	Burg-Waechter Castello, Düsseldorf, Germany	
6	Loss	5–1	Katie Taylor	TKO	7 (10), 0:57	29 Apr 2017	Wembley Stadium, London, England	For vacant WBA International lightweight title
5	Win	5–0	Hasna Tukic	TKO	1 (10), 0:45	4 Mar 2017	Argensporthalle, Wangen im Allgäu, Germany	Won vacant WBC Youth super-featherweight title
4	Win	4–0	Kleopatra Tolnai	TKO	3 (6), 0:57	5 Nov 2016	Ballhaus Forum, Munich, Germany	
3	Win	3–0	Karina Kopinska	UD	4	27 Aug 2016	Huxleys, Berlin, Germany	
2	Win	2–0	Zsofia Bedo	PTS	4	23 Jul 2016	Iron Gym - Forckenberckstr 9-13, Berlin, Germany	
1	Win	1–0	Bojana Libiszewska	UD	4	6 May 2016	Huxleys, Berlin, Germany	

== See also ==
- List of female boxers
- List of southpaw stance boxers

Sporting positions
Regional boxing titles
New title	WBC Youth super-featherweight champion 4 March 2017 – April 2017; Vacated	Vacant
Vacant Title last held by Licia Boudersa	European featherweight champion 17 November 2018 – 2019; Vacated	Vacant Title next held by Anna Lisa Brozzi
Vacant Title last held by Sarah Mahfoud	IBF Inter-Continental featherweight champion 28 October 2023 – 21 September 2024; Won world title	Vacant
Minor world boxing titles
Vacant Title next held by Elina Tissen	WIBF featherweight champion 17 February 2018 – 18 May 2018	Succeeded by Elina Tissen
Vacant Title next held by Elina Tissen	WIBF featherweight champion 5 November 2022 – 2023; Vacated	Vacant Title next held by Elina Tissen
Vacant Title next held by Elina Tissen	Global Boxing Union featherweight champion 5 November 2022 – 2023; Vacated	Vacant Title next held by Elina Tissen
Major world boxing titles
Vacant Title last held by Amanda Serrano	IBF featherweight champion 21 September 2024 – present	Incumbent
