= Jessica Camara =

Canadian boxer (born 1988)

Personal information
- Nickname: The Cobra
- Born: 18 April 1988 (age 38) Cambridge, Ontario, Canada
- Height: 5 ft 6 in (168 cm)
- Weight: Lightweight; Light-welterweight

Boxing career
- Reach: 67 in (170 cm)
- Stance: Orthodox

Boxing record
- Total fights: 21
- Wins: 15
- Win by KO: 3
- Losses: 5
- Draws: 1

Jessica Camara (born 18 April 1988) is a Canadian professional boxer who has held the WBA female Gold lightweight title.

== Professional career ==
Camara made her professional debut on 30 March 2017, scoring a four-round unanimous decision (UD) victory against Heidy Martinez at the Montreal Casino in Canada.

After compiling a record of 7–1, she faced Melissa St. Vil for the vacant WBO-NABO female lightweight title on 8 February 2021 at the Civic Center in Hammond, Indiana. Camara lost via ten-round UD with two judges scoring the bout 96–94 and the third scoring it 97–93.

After an eight-round UD victory against Heather Hardy in May 2021, she faced reigning champion Kali Reis for the WBA, IBO, and vacant WBO female light welterweight titles on 19 November at the SNHU Arena in Manchester, New Hampshire. In her first attempt at a world championship, Camara suffered the third defeat of her career, losing via ten-round split decision (SD) with one judge scoring the bout 96–94 in favour of Camara while the other two scored it 97–93 for Reis.

Camara scored the biggest win of her career to date when she defeated the previously unbeaten former two-weight World champion Choi Hyun-mi to claim the vacant WBA female lightweight Gold title by split decision at Ajou University, Suwon, South Korea on 27 April 2024.

She challenged WBC and IBO female lightweight champion Caroline Dubois at Park Community Arena in Sheffield, England, on 11 January 2025. The fight ended in a technical draw at the start of round three on the orders of the ringside doctor after Camara suffered a cut to her left eye caused by an accidental clash of heads.

Camara challenged Chantelle Cameron for her interim WBC super lightweight title at Madison Square Garden, New York City, New York, on July 11, 2025. She lost by unanimous decision.

== Professional boxing record ==
21 fights	15 wins	5 losses
By knockout	3	2
By decision	12	3
Draws	1	

No.	Result	Record	Opponent	Type	Round, time	Date	Location	Notes
21	Win	15–5–1	Lenka Volejnikova	UD	6	8 Nov 2025	Bay Street Armoury, Victoria, British Columbia, Canada	
20	Loss	14–5–1	Chantelle Cameron	UD	10	11 Jul 2025	Madison Square Garden, New York City, New York, U.S.	For WBC interim female super-lightweight title
19	Draw	14–4–1	Caroline Dubois	TD	3 (10)	11 Jan 2025	Park Community Arena, Sheffield, England	For the WBC and IBO lightweight titles
18	Win	14–4	Bonnie Hunter	UD	10	14 Sep 2024	Tohu, Montreal, Canada	
17	Win	13–4	Choi Hyun-mi	SD	10 (10)	27 Apr 2024	Ajou University, Suwon, South Korea	Won the vacant WBA female Gold lightweight title
16	Win	12–4	Estefania Orozco Oliva	TKO	4 (6)	10 Dec 2023	Rebel Entertainment Complex, Toronto, Canada	
15	Win	11–4	Joana Chavarria Lopez Lopez	UD	6 (6)	22 Jul 2023	Kent North Imperial Centre, Richibucto, Canada	
14	Loss	10–4	Karla Ramos Zamora	TKO	4 (10)	16 Mar 2023	Place Bell, Laval, Canada	
13	Win	10–3	Josefina Vega	KO	1 (6)	17 September 2022	Chase Fieldhouse, Wilmington, U.S.	
12	Win	9–3	Simone Aparecida da Silva	KO	2 (8)	13 Aug 2022	Bayou Event Center, Houston, U.S.	
11	Loss	8–3	Kali Reis	SD	10	19 Nov 2021	SNHU Arena, Manchester, New Hampshire, U.S.	For WBA, IBO, and vacant WBO female light welterweight title
10	Win	8–2	Heather Hardy	UD	8	14 May 2021	Embassy Suites, Murfreesboro, Tennessee, U.S.	
9	Loss	7–2	Melissa St. Vil	UD	10	8 Feb 2020	Civic Center, Hammond, Indiana, U.S.	For vacant WBO-NABO female lightweight title
8	Win	7–1	Beatriz Aguilar	UD	6	19 Oct 2019	Memorial Centre, Peterborough, Ontario, Canada	
7	Win	6–1	Dalila Velazquez	MD	6	8 Jun 2019	Montreal Casino, Montreal, Quebec, Canada	
6	Win	5–1	Jenna Johlin Thompson	MD	6	1 Nov 2018	Washington Hilton, Washington, D.C., U.S.	
5	Loss	4–1	Natalie Brown	KO	3 (6), 0:59	2 Jun 2018	Scotiabank Convention Centre, Niagara Falls, Ontario, Canada	
4	Win	4–0	Guadalupe Ortiz	MD	4	15 Feb 2018	Montreal Casino, Montreal, Quebec, Canada	
3	Win	3–0	Giovanna Gonzalez	UD	4	17 Dec 2017	Montreal Casino, Montreal, Quebec, Canada	
2	Win	2–0	Erika Hernández	UD	4	28 Oct 2017	Hamilton Convention Centre, Hamilton, Ontario, Canada	
1	Win	1–0	Heidy Martinez	UD	4	30 Mar 2017	Montreal Casino, Montreal, Quebec, Canada	
