= Ikram Kerwat =

Tunisian boxer (born 1984)

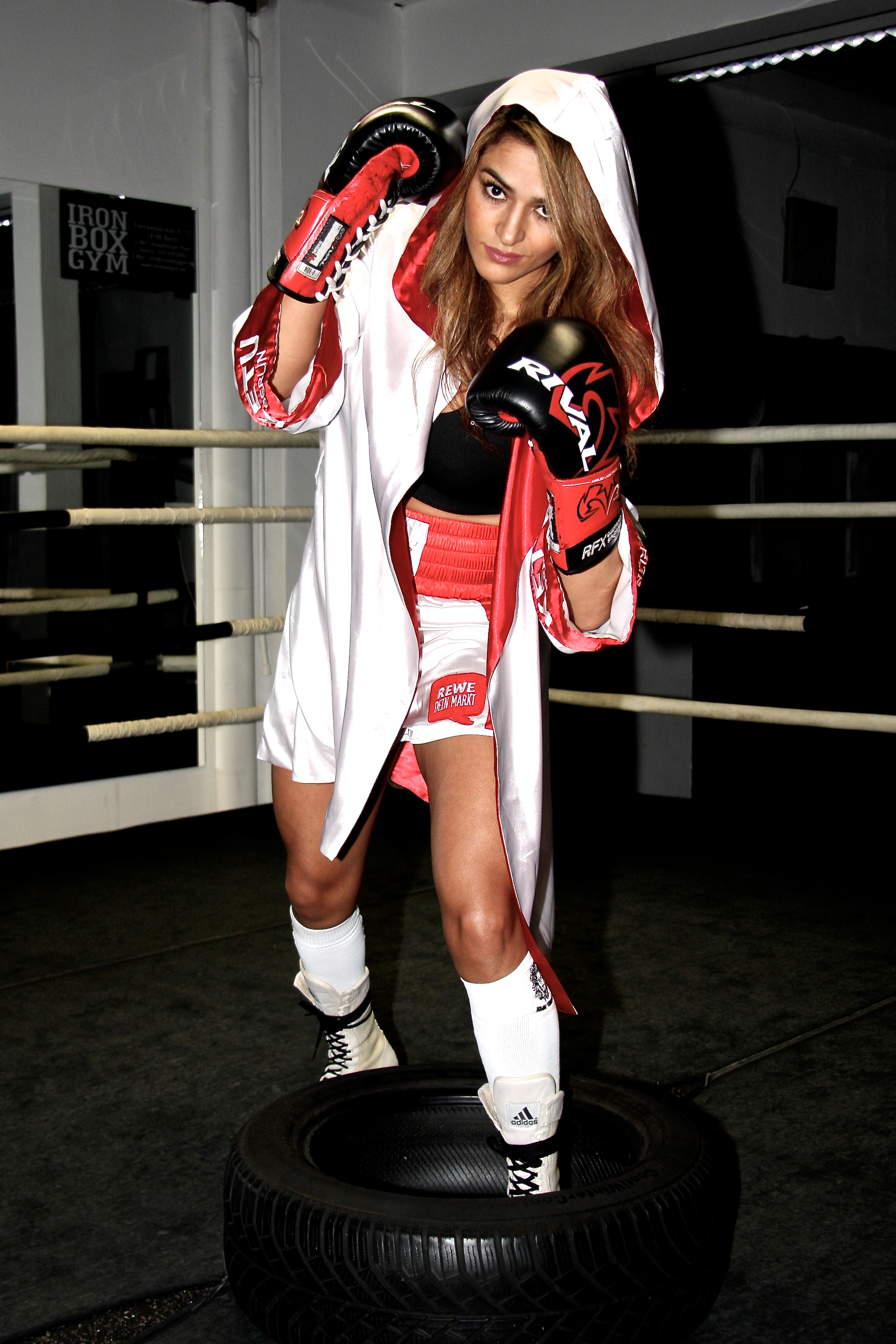
- Born: March 18, 1984 (age 42); Béja, Tunisia
- Nationality: Tunisian, German
- Height: 5 ft 7 in (1.70 m)
- Weight: 135 lb (61 kg; 9.6 st)
- Division: Lightweight
- Reach: 70.0 in (178 cm)
- Style: Boxing
- Stance: Orthodox

Professional boxing record
- Total: 17
- Wins: 14
- By knockout: 5
- Losses: 3

Other information
- Website: http://ikram-kerwat.de/
- Boxing record from BoxRec

Ikram Kerwat born March 18, 1984, in Béja, Tunisia, is a Tunisian-German boxer.

== Amateur ==
Ikram Kerwat began practicing judo at the age of four, a sport she would continue to the age of eleven. At the age of nine, she started boxing. She emigrated to Frankfurt am Main, Germany at the age of thirteen, where she trained with Eppie (Efraim) Chapman (world champion and multiple European champion in Kickboxing and Karate), who was her coach for many years.

At the age of nineteen, she trained under Emil Freihaut (CSC Frankfurt). At the age of 25, she moved to Berlin with the goal of focusing on her career, becoming an amateur at SC Eintracht Berlin, where she won three bouts (two victories, one by K. and a defeat) and taking third place at the German Championship 2010. After having two children, she started a professional career at the end of 2013, joining Legends Fight & Box Academy in Berlin.

== Professional career ==
On February 27, 2015, Kerwat made her professional debut at Universal Hall in Berlin. In the first round, she met her opponent Sandy Weber from Leipzig so hard that the referee broke off the fight. Shortly afterwards the referee acknowledged the mismatch and Weber was removed from the ring, Kerwat winning by knockout.

On June 18, 2015, Kerwat's manager, Andreas Greiner announced that Enno Werle was appointed as long term coach.

On 1 August 2015, Kerwat fought against Polish Danka Kruczek in Babelsberg (Metropolis-Halle), Potsdam, winning through TKO in the 1 round (1.10 minutes).

Since September 2015, Ikram Kerwat has been trained by Sven Ottke.

On September 19, 2015, the lightweight Kerwat and Bojana Libiszewska (9 bouts, 1 victory, 8 losses) fought each other. Kerwat, seconded by former World Super Middleweight champion Sven Ottke, won on points.

On November 17, Kerwat defeated Laznar Catalinia after 18 seconds in the first round by TKO.

On 12 December 2015, Kerwat won by TKO against Zsofia Bedo in Dessau.

On 9 April 2016, Kerwat won the vacant title of international champion of the WBC in the first round against Gina Chamie by TKO in 98 seconds, and was crowned the WBC International Champion in lightweight on Saturday evening in Potsdam.

On 16 July 2016, after being trained in Germany by Ulli Wegner, Kerwat fought in Berlin's Max-Schmeling-Halle against world champion Ramona Kühne. After being knocked down in the fourth round, she conceded after an elbow injury in the sixth round.

After the injury-related break, Kerwat fought against Britain Hart on February 17, 2017, and won.

Since 2017 she has been travelling to Pensacola to train with Roy Jones Jr.

== Personal life ==
She took part in the "Give To Eat Mission" which provides food and medicine for children in Ghana. Kerwat speaks four languages, and she is married with two children and lives in Berlin.

== Professional boxing record ==
18 fights	14 wins	3 losses
By knockout	5	1
By decision	9	2
No contests	1	

No.	Result	Record	Opponent	Type	Round, time	Date	Location	Notes
18	Win	14-3 (1)	Diana Ayala	UD	10	Jun 24, 2023	Shkodër, Albania	For vacant WBF female super-lightweight title
17	Win	13-3 (1)	Claudia Andrea Lopez	UD	10	Jun 24, 2023	Sporthalle, Alfdorf, Germany	For vacant WBF female welterweight title
16	Win	12-3 (1)	Nana Dokadze	UD	6	Feb 18, 2023	Porsche-Arena, Stuttgart, Germany	
15	NC	11-3 (1)	Delfine Persoon	NC	1 (10) 1:06	Nov 15, 2022	Coca-Cola Arena, Dubai, UAE	For WBC Silver female super-featherweight titie. Persoon hit Kerwat when she was on the ground following a knockdown
14	Loss	11–3	Jocelyn Morales	UD	6	Nov 6, 2020	Hotel La Parroquia, Patzcuaro, Michoacan de Ocampo, Mexico	
13	Win	11–2	Happy Daudi	UD	6	Mar 26, 2020	Dubai Duty Free Tennis Stadium, Dubai, UAE	
12	Win	10–2	Marija Zivkovic	UD	6	May 23, 2019	Work Your Champ Arena, Hamburg, Germany	
11	Loss	9–2	Simone da Silva	UD	10	May 23, 2019	Casino Del Sol, Tucson, Arizona, U.S.	
10	Win	9–1	Angel Gladney	UD	8	Feb 8, 2018	Civic Center, Pensacola, Florida, U.S.	
9	Win	8–1	Ashley Hancock	UD	4	Oct 14, 2017	Pensacola Bay Center, Pensacola, Florida, U.S.	
8	Win	7–1	Britain Hart	UD		Sep 17, 2017	Chase Center, Wilmington, Delaware, U.S.	
7	Loss	6–1	Ramona Kuehne	RTD		July 16, 2016	Max Schmeling Halle, Prenzlauer Berg, Berlin, Germany	
6	Win	6–0	Gina Chamie	TKO		May 9, 2016	MBS Arena, Potsdam, Brandenburg, Germany	For vacant WBC International female lightweight title
5	Win	5–0	Zsofia Bedo	TKO		Dec 12, 2015	Glaspalast, Dessau Dessau, Saxony-Ahalt, Germany	
4	Win	4–0	Catalina Lazar	TKO		Oct 14, 2015	Turbinenhalle, Worms, Rhineland-Palatinate, Germany	
3	Win	3–0	Bojana Libiszewska	PTS		Sep 19, 2015	EMKA Sportzentrum, Velbert, North Rhine-Westphalia, Germany	
2	Win	2–0	Danuta Kruczek	TKO		Aug 1, 2015	Metropolis Halle, Potsdam, Brandenburg, Germany	
1	Win	1–0	Sandy Weber	TKO		Feb 27, 2015	Universal Hall, Moabit, Berlin, Germany	
