= Angelina Lukas =

Kazakhstani boxer (born 1997)

Personal information
- Native name: Ангелина Лукас
- Nickname: Barbie
- Born: 12 March 1997 (age 29) Taraz, Kazakhstan
- Height: 167 cm (5 ft 6 in)
- Weight: Super-flyweight

Boxing career
- Stance: Orthodox

Boxing record
- Total fights: 18
- Wins: 16
- Win by KO: 9
- Losses: 2

Angelina Lukas (born 12 March 1997) is a Kazakhstani professional boxer. She won the vacant IBO female super-flyweight title by defeating Débora Anahí López on a unanimous decision in Bangkok, Thailand, on 6 October 2024. Lukas successfully defended her title against Daniela Asenjo in Taraz, Kazakhstan, on 1 June 2025, when her opponent retired at the end of the sixth round. However, in the days after the fight Asenjo, who had inflicted the only loss on Lukas' professional record in 2023, and her coaching team alleged they had been coerced into losing and rejected an offer from the IBO for a rematch.
