= Anne-Sophie Da Costa =

French boxer (born 1982)

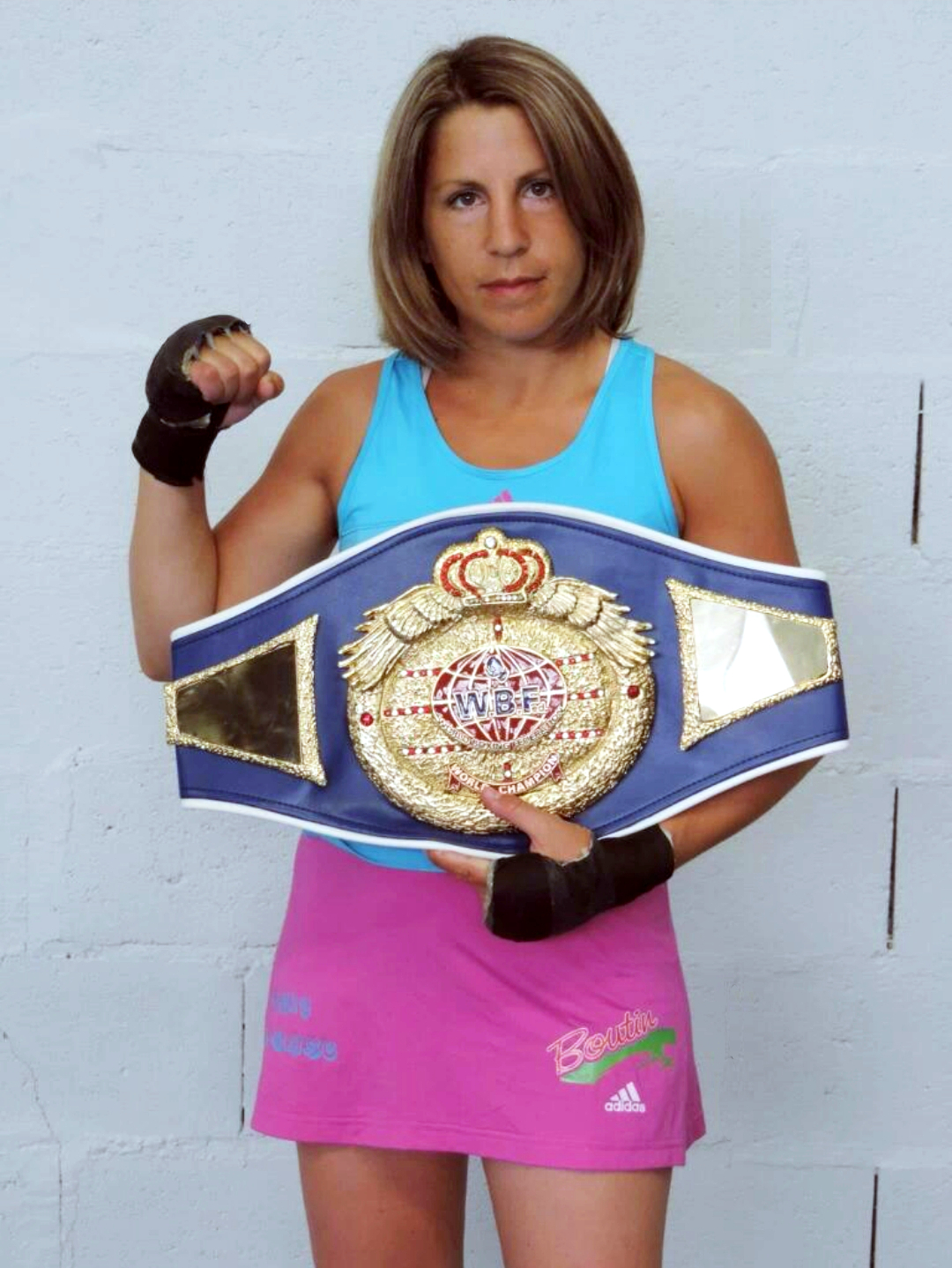
- Born: July 10, 1982 (age 44); Reims, France
- Nationality: French
- Division: minimumweight Light flyweight
- Style: Boxing

Professional boxing record
- Total: 36
- Wins: 29
- By knockout: 11
- Losses: 7

Anne-Sophie Da Costa is a French boxer who is a former WBF minimumweight champion.

== Boxing ==
After a rough period with plenty of adversity in the ring, World Boxing Federation (WBF) Women's World Light Flyweight Champion Anne Sophie Da Costa fought against Tanzanian Halima Vunjabei and won 12 May 2018.
