= Noni Tenge =

South African boxer (born 1982)

Personal information
- Nickname: She Bee Stingin
- Nationality: (South Africa) South African
- Born: 1982 (age 43–44)
- Weight: Welterweight, Light-middleweight

Boxing career
- Stance: Orthodox

Boxing record
- Wins: 20
- Win by KO: 11
- Losses: 1
- Draws: 1

Noni Tenge (born 1982) is a South African former professional boxer. She became the first woman from her country to win a professional boxing world championship when she claimed the IBF female welterweight title by knocking out defending champion Daniella Smith in the fourth-round at Carnival City in Brakpan, South Africa, on 11 June 2011. She was stripped of the title in July 2012 for failing to defend the belt within the required time period.

Tenge fought Layla McCarter for the WBA female light-middleweight title at Orient Theatre, East London, South Africa, on 30 September 2012, but lost by technical knockout in the eighth-round.
