= Ségolène Lefebvre =

French boxer (born 1993)

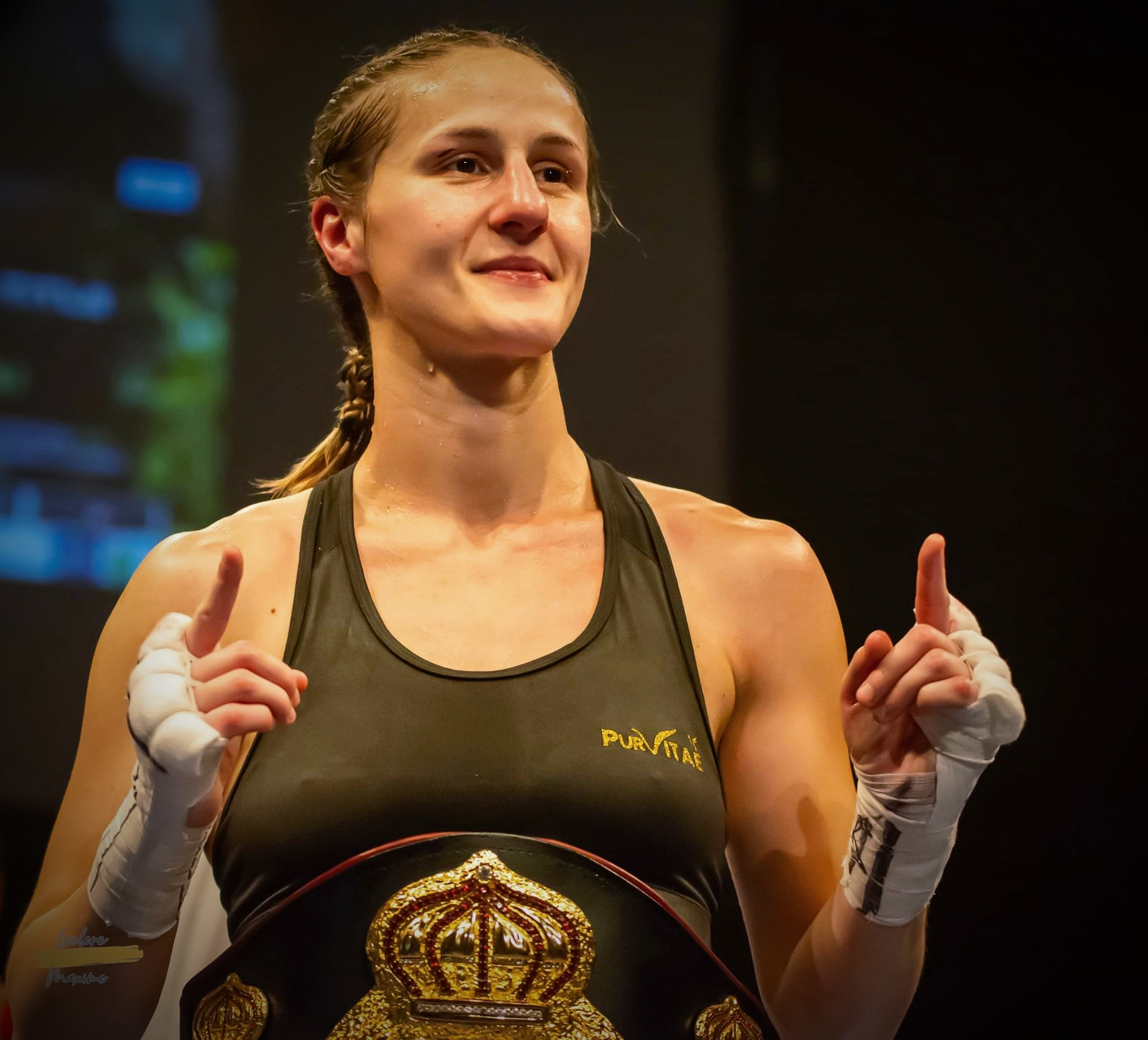

Personal information
- Nickname: Majestic
- Born: 30 May 1993 (age 33)
- Weight: Super-bantamweight; Super-featherweight

Boxing career
- Stance: Orthodox

Boxing record
- Total fights: 21
- Wins: 20
- Win by KO: 1
- Losses: 1

Ségolène Lefebvre (born 30 May 1993) is a French professional boxer who held the WBO female super-bantamweight title from November 2021 until April 2024.

== Professional career ==
Lefebvre made her professional debut on 24 January 2015, scoring a four-round points decision (PTS) victory against Bojana Libiszewska at the Salle Marie-José Pérec in Fourmies, France.

After compiling a record of 3–0 (0 KOs), she defeated Taoussy L'Hadji via majority decision (MD) to capture the French female super-featherweight title on 22 April 2016 at the Salle Gayant in Douai, France.

Two fights later she defeated Gabriella Mezei via unanimous decision (UD) on 4 November 2016 in Douai, capturing the vacant WBF International female super-bantamweight title. One judge scored the bout 98–92 while the other two scored it 97–93.

In her next fight she challenged for her first world championship, facing Simone Da Silva Duarte for the vacant WBF female super-bantamweight title on 10 March 2017 at the Salle Gayant. After Lefebvre landed a flurry of punches in the ninth round–and with Duarte no longer defending herself–the referee called a halt to the contest, awarding Lefebvre a ninth-round technical knockout (TKO) victory.

She made three successful defences of her title before facing Laura Griffa on 12 April 2019 at the Salle Gayant. With the vacant IBO female super-bantamweight title also on the line, Lefebvre emerged victorious via UD.

Following a successful defence of her WBF title against Ana Maria Lozano in October 2019, Lefebvre defeated Jasmina Nad via UD on 28 May 2021 at the Salle Gayant, capturing the vacant WBC Silver female super-bantamweight title. The judges' scorecards read 100–90, 99–91 and 98–92.

Her next fight came against Paulette Valenzuela on 20 November at the Salle Gayant, with the vacant WBO female super-bantamweight title on the line. Lefebvre was knocked to the floor in the tenth round en route to a UD victory to capture her first major world championship. With the win she was promoted to number three in The Ring magazine's super-bantamweight rankings.

On 13 April 2024, Lefebvre lost her WBO championship to England's Ellie Scotney suffering the first defeat of her professional career by unanimous decision in a fight that was also for her opponent's IBF title and the vacant Ring Magazine belt.

== Professional boxing record ==
21 fights	20 wins	1 loss
By knockout	1	0
By decision	19	1

21	Win	20-1	Almudena Álvarez	PTS	8	25 November 2025	Salle Gayant, Douai, France	
20	Win	19-1	Juliana Vanesa Basualdo	SD	10	24 October 2024	Hippodrome Municipal, Douai, France	Won WBA Gold female super-bantamweight title
19	Loss	18-1	Ellie Scotney	UD	10	13 April 2024	Manchester Arena, Manchester, England	Lost WBO female super-bantamweight title
18	Win	18-0	Tysie Gallagher	UD	10	24 Nov 2023	Hippodrome de Douai, France	Retained WBO female super-bantamweight title
17	Win	17-0	Debora Anahi Dionicius	UD	10	29 April 2023	Salle Gayant, Douai, France	Retained WBO female super-bantamweight title
16	Win	16–0	Melania Sorroche	UD	10	7 May 2022	Salle Gayant, Douai, France	Retained WBO female super-bantamweight title
15	Win	15–0	Paulette Valenzuela	UD	10	20 Nov 2021	Salle Gayant, Douai, France	Won WBO female super-bantamweight title
14	Win	14–0	Jasmina Nad	UD	10	28 May 2021	Salle Gayant, Douai, France	Won vacant WBC Silver female super-bantamweight title
13	Win	13–0	Ana Maria Lozano	UD	10	26 Oct 2019	Salle Gayant, Douai, France	Retained WBF female super-bantamweight title
12	Win	12–0	Laura Griffa	UD	10	12 Apr 2019	Salle Gayant, Douai, France	Retained WBF female super-bantamweight title; Won vacant IBO female super-bantamweight title
11	Win	11–0	Yésica Patricia Marcos	UD	10	2 Nov 2018	Salle Gayant, Douai, France	Retained WBF female super-bantamweight title
10	Win	10–0	Gabriela Bouvier	UD	10	28 Apr 2018	Salle Gayant, Douai, France	Retained WBF female super-bantamweight title
9	Win	9–0	Naroyuki Koasicha	UD	10	3 Nov 2017	Salle Gayant, Douai, France	Retained WBF female super-bantamweight title
8	Win	8–0	Sara Marjanovic	UD	6	13 May 2017	Salle des Sports d'Anchin, Pecquencourt, France	
7	Win	7–0	Simone da Silva Duarte	TKO	9 (10)	10 Mar 2017	Salle Gayant, Douai, France	Won vacant WBF female super-bantamweight title
6	Win	6–0	Gabriella Mezei	UD	10	4 Nov 2016	Salle Gayant, Douai, France	Won vacant WBF International female super-bantamweight title
5	Win	5–0	Bojana Libiszewska	UD	8	21 May 2016	Salle des Sports d'Anchin, Pecquencourt, France	
4	Win	4–0	Taoussy L'Hadji	MD	8	22 Apr 2016	Salle Gayant, Douai, France	Won French female super-featherweight title
3	Win	3–0	Bilitis Gaucher	PTS	6	14 Nov 2015	Salle Marie-José Pérec, Fourmies, France	
2	Win	2–0	Suzana Radovanovic	UD	4	18 Apr 2015	Salle Marie-José Pérec, Fourmies, France	
1	Win	1–0	Bojana Libiszewska	PTS	4	24 Jan 2015	Salle Marie-José Pérec, Fourmies, France	
