= Melissa St. Vil =

American boxer

Personal information
- Nickname: Little Miss Tyson
- Born: 8 September 1983 (age 43) New York City
- Height: 5 ft 4 in (163 cm)
- Weight: Super Featherweight; Lightweight; Welterweight

Boxing career
- Reach: 64 in (163 cm)
- Stance: Orthodox

Boxing record
- Total fights: 23
- Wins: 15
- Win by KO: 1
- Losses: 4
- Draws: 4
- No contests: 0

Melissa St. Vil (born September 8, 1983) is an American professional boxer. She has challenged twice for world titles; the WBC super featherweight title in 2018 and the WBC lightweight title in March 2019.

== Professional career ==
On 31 July 2009, she beat Jennifer Han who was a former World Combat League fighter, IKF Amateur Tournament Champion, and a Four-Time National Boxing Champion (Golden Gloves and USA Boxing).

She later captured the vacant WBC Silver super featherweight title on 16 April 2016 by defeating Baby Nansen and has since defended it twice.

== Personal life ==
Melissa was assaulted by Roger Mayweather, Floyd Mayweather Jr.'s trainer and uncle. She was rushed by ambulance to Mountain View Hospital and was treated for injuries consistent with strangulation and later released. Roger Mayweather was arrested and charged with 2 felonies. The first count for coercion force, the second count for battery with strangulation.

== Professional boxing record ==
23 fights	15 wins	4 losses
By knockout	1	1
By decision	14	3
Draws	4	

No.	Result	Record	Opponent	Type	Round, time	Date	Location	Notes
23	Win	15–4–4	(Colombia) Calista Silgado	UD	6	16 Sep 2022	(United States) Brooklyn Masonic Temple, New York City, New York, US	
22	Win	14–4–4	(Canada) Olivia Gerula	UD	8	14 May 2021	(United States) Embassy Suites, Murfreesboro, Tennessee, US	
21	Win	13–4–4	(Canada) Jessica Camara	UD	10	08 Feb 2020	(United States) Hammond Civic Center, Hammond, Indiana, US	
20	Win	12–4–4	(Dominican Republic) Dahiana Santana	UD	6	24 Oct 2019	(United States) Generoso Pope Athletic Complex, New York City, New York, US	
19	Loss	11–4–4	(Belgium) Delfine Persoon	RTD	7 (10)	9 Mar 2019	Kortrijk, Belgium	For WBC female lightweight title
18	Win	11–3–4	(United States) Mayra Hernandez	UD	8	29 Sep 2018	(United States) Kings Theatre, New York, US	
17	Loss	10–3–4	(Finland) Eva Wahlström	MD	10	6 Apr 2018	Kulttuuritalo, Helsinki, Finland	For WBC female super featherweight title
16	Win	10–2–4	(Dominican Republic) Diana Garcia Dominguez	TKO	5 (8)	26 Oct 2017	Karibe Convention Center, Port-au-Prince, Haiti	
15	Draw	9–2–4	(Mexico) Jessica Gonzalez	TD	10	31 Mar 2017	Karibe Convention Center, Port-au-Prince, Haiti	Retained WBC Silver female super featherweight title
14	Win	9–2–3	(Dominican Republic) Diana Garcia Dominguez	UD	6	16 Nov 2016	Karibe Convention Center, Port-au-Prince, Haiti	
13	Win	8–2–3	(Dominican Republic) Katy Wilson Castillo	UD	10	9 Jul 2016	Sichuan Gymnasium, Chengdu, China	Retained WBC Silver super featherweight title; Won vacant IBU super featherweight title
12	Win	7–2–3	(New Zealand) Baby Nansen	UD	10	16 Apr 2016	The Trusts Arena, Auckland, New Zealand	Won vacant WBC Silver female super featherweight title
11	Loss	6–2–3	(Bolivia) Jennifer Salinas	UD	10	12 Nov 2015	(United States) Martin's Valley Mansion, Cockeysville, Maryland, US	For UBF female super featherweight title
10	Draw	6–1–3	(United States) Ashleigh Curry	SD	6	6 Nov 2014	(United States) Martin's Valley Mansion, Cockeysville, Maryland, US	
9	Win	6–1–2	(United States) Dominga Olivo	UD	6	10 May 2014	(United States) Whitehall Armory, Whitehall, New York, US	
8	Win	5–1–2	(United States) Sarah Kuhn	UD	10	3 Aug 2013	(United States) Whitehall Athletic Club, Whitehall, New York, US	Won vacant IWBF welterweight title
7	Win	4–1–2	(Canada) Natasha Spence	MD	8	8 Feb 2013	(United States) Chase Center, Wilmington, Delaware, US	
6	Win	3–1–2	(United States) Lucretia Meacham	UD	4	13 Oct 2012	(United States) Benton Convention Center, Winston-Salem, North Carolina, US	
5	Win	2–1–2	(United States) Evette Collazo	UD	8	18 Jun 2011	(United States) Grand Victoria Casino, Rising Sun, Indiana, US	
4	Draw	1–1–2	(United States) Althea Saunders	MD	4	4 Mar 2011	(United States) Resorts Hotel & Casino, Atlantic City, New Jersey, US	
3	Win	1–1–1	(United States) Jennifer Han	MD	4	31 Jul 2009	(United States) Pan American Center, Las Cruces, New Mexico, US	
2	Loss	0–1–1	(United States) Emily Klinefelter	SD	5	4 Apr 2009	(United States) Epic Night Club, Minneapolis, Minnesota, US	
1	Draw	0–0–1	(United States) Olivia Fonseca	PTS	4	30 Mar 2007	(United States) Phoenixville High School, Phoenixville, Pennsylvania, US	

== Titles ==
- WIBA super featherweight title (130 Ibs)
- IWBF welterweight title (147 Ibs)
- WBC Silver female super featherweight title (130 Ibs)
- IBU super featherweight title
