= Umi Ishikawa =

Japanese boxer (born 1984)

Personal information
- Born: 21 March 1984 (age 42) Tokyo Japan
- Height: 160 cm (5 ft 3 in)
- Weight: Atomweight, Strawweight

Boxing career
- Stance: Orthodox

Boxing record
- Total fights: 15
- Wins: 12
- Win by KO: 10
- Losses: 3

Umi Ishikawa (born 21 March 1984) is a Japanese professional boxer who holds the interim WBC female strawweight World title.

== Career ==
Ishikawa made her professional boxing debut in September 2016 when she created headlines by bringing an owl to the weigh-in for the fight.

She knocked out Nitinart Plabplerng in the fourth round of their contest at Wat Pak Bo School, Bangkok, Thailand, on 25 May 2023 to claim the WBC female atomweight International title.

Moving up a weight division for her next bout, Ishikawa won the vacant WBC female strawweight Silver title by knocking out Sothita Sitthichai in round three at the Singmanassak Muaythai School, Pathum Thani, Thailand, on 27 August 2023. The two fighters met again at the same venue on 3 May 2024, this time with the vacant interim WBC female strawweight World title on the line. Ishikawa knocked out Sitthichai in the second round.

== Professional boxing record ==
15 fights	12 wins	3 losses
By knockout	10	1
By decision	2	2

No.	Result	Record	Opponent	Type	Round, time	Date	Location	Notes
15	Win	12–3	Sothita Sittichai	KO	2 (10)	3 May 2024	Singmanassak Muaythai School, Pathum Thani, Thailand	Won the vacant interim WBC female strawweight World title
14	Win	11–3	Sothita Sittichai	KO	3 (8)	27 August 2023	Singmanassak Muaythai School, Pathum Thani, Thailand	Won the vacant WBC female strawweight Silver title
13	Win	10–3	Nitinart Plabplerng	KO	4 (10)	25 May 2023	Wat Pak Bo School, Bangkok, Thailand	Won the vacant WBC female International atomweight title
12	Win	9–3	Wassana Kamdee	RTD	4 (6)	2 February 2020	M.U Den Boxing Group, Bangkok, Thailand	
11	Win	8–3	Tassana Paladsrichuay	TKO	4 (10)	9 October 2019	M.U Den Boxing Group, Bangkok, Thailand	
10	Lost	7–3	Kanyarat Yoohanngoh	TKO	3 (8)	22 February 2019	Siam Paradise Entertainment Centre, Bangkok, Thailand	
9	Win	7–2	Wassana Kamdee	RTD	2 (6)	23 August 2018	Elorde Sports Complex, Paranaque City, Philippines	
8	Win	6–2	Sutthinee Bamrungpao	TKO	4 (6)	24 May 2018	Quibors Boxing Gym, Bacoor, Philippines	
7	Lost	5–2	Norj Guro	UD	6 (6)	10 March 2018	San Pedro Plaza, San Pedro, Philippines	
6	Lost	5–1	Yumiko Shimooka	UD	6 (6)	11 December 2017	Korakuen Hall, Tokyo, Japan	
5	Win	5–0	Aisah Alico	RTD	2 (6)	27 June 2017	Makati Cinema Square Boxing Arena, Makati City, Philippines	
4	Win	4–0	Nichakon Sisakunkhiri	UD	4 (4)	30 May 2017	Korakuen Hall, Tokyo, Japan	
3	Win	3–0	Paveethida Moonpahat	TKO	2 (4)	15 March 2017	Korakuen Hall, Tokyo, Japan	
2	Win	2–0	Tippawan Nintongyoo	TKO	3 (4)	7 November 2016	Korakuen Hall, Tokyo, Japan	
1	Win	1–0	Sansanee Intachai	MD	4 (4)	21 September 2016	Korakuen Hall, Tokyo, Japan	
