= Daniela Asenjo =

Chilean boxer (born 1991)

Personal information
- Nickname: La Leona
- Born: 2 March 1991 (age 35) Valdivia, Chile
- Weight: Flyweight; Super-flyweight

Boxing career
- Stance: Orthodox

Boxing record
- Total fights: 26
- Wins: 18
- Win by KO: 2
- Losses: 5
- Draws: 3

Daniela Elizabeth Asenjo Garrido (born 2 March 1991) is a Chilean professional boxer. She is a former IBO female super-flyweight champion.

== Early life and education ==
She studied at the Juan Sebastián Bach Music School in Valdivia, where she specialized in violin, becoming a teacher of this instrument. Later she studied psychopedagogy at Inacap in Valdivia, with a postgraduate degree in behavioral disorders, working in schools in Valdivia. At the same time she began practicing boxing in 2008.

== Professional career ==
Since her beginnings in practice in 2008, Asenjo has made several presentations in the country, with good results. In 2012, she began her professional boxing career.

In 2016, Asenjo, together with Carolina Rodríguez, were the only professional female boxers in Chile.

She participated in various South American kickboxing championships, winning the South American kickboxing title in Montevideo in October 2017 against Camila Aspe.

Asenjo became the national super flyweight champion in 2011. Since then, she has dedicated herself completely to boxing, practicing and teaching this discipline at her K.O. Club.

Due to a cervical injury, she was unable to fight for the IBF world title against Argentina's Débora Dionicius on 18 May 2018, at the Huracán Club in Villaguay, Argentina, as scheduled.

On 22 September 2018, at the Gran Arena Monticello, Asenjo won the WBA Latin American super flyweight title, defeating Panama's Carlota Santos by technical knockout in the third round.

On 2 September 2019, the WBA stripped the belt from Asenjo, due to weigh-in problems in a fight held in Mexico.

On 12 October 2019, she won the WBO Latin American super flyweight title against Argentina's Aixa Adema.

On 19 April 2020 Asenjo was set to fight to regain the WBA super flyweight world title against Mexican Maribel Ramírez, but due to the pandemic, the bout was cancelled.

On 7 June 2022, Asenjo won the IBO super flyweight world championship after defeating American Casey Morton in Paris. Her victory was declared by decision of the fight's judges.

On 10 August 2024, Asenjo challenged IBF female flyweight champion Gabriela Fundora at Mandalay Bay Resort and Casino in Las Vegas, Nevada, losing via unanimous decision with all three ringside judges awarding every round to her opponent.

She attempted to regain the IBO female super-flyweight title by challenging defending champion Angelina Lukas in Taraz, Kazakhstan, on 1 June 2025. Asenjo lost when she retired at the end of the sixth round. However, in the days after the fight she and her coaching team alleged they had been coerced into losing, although they rejected an offer from the IBO for a rematch.
