= Hammond Civic Center =

Arena in Indiana, United States

Coordinates: 41.6075°N 87.5129°W

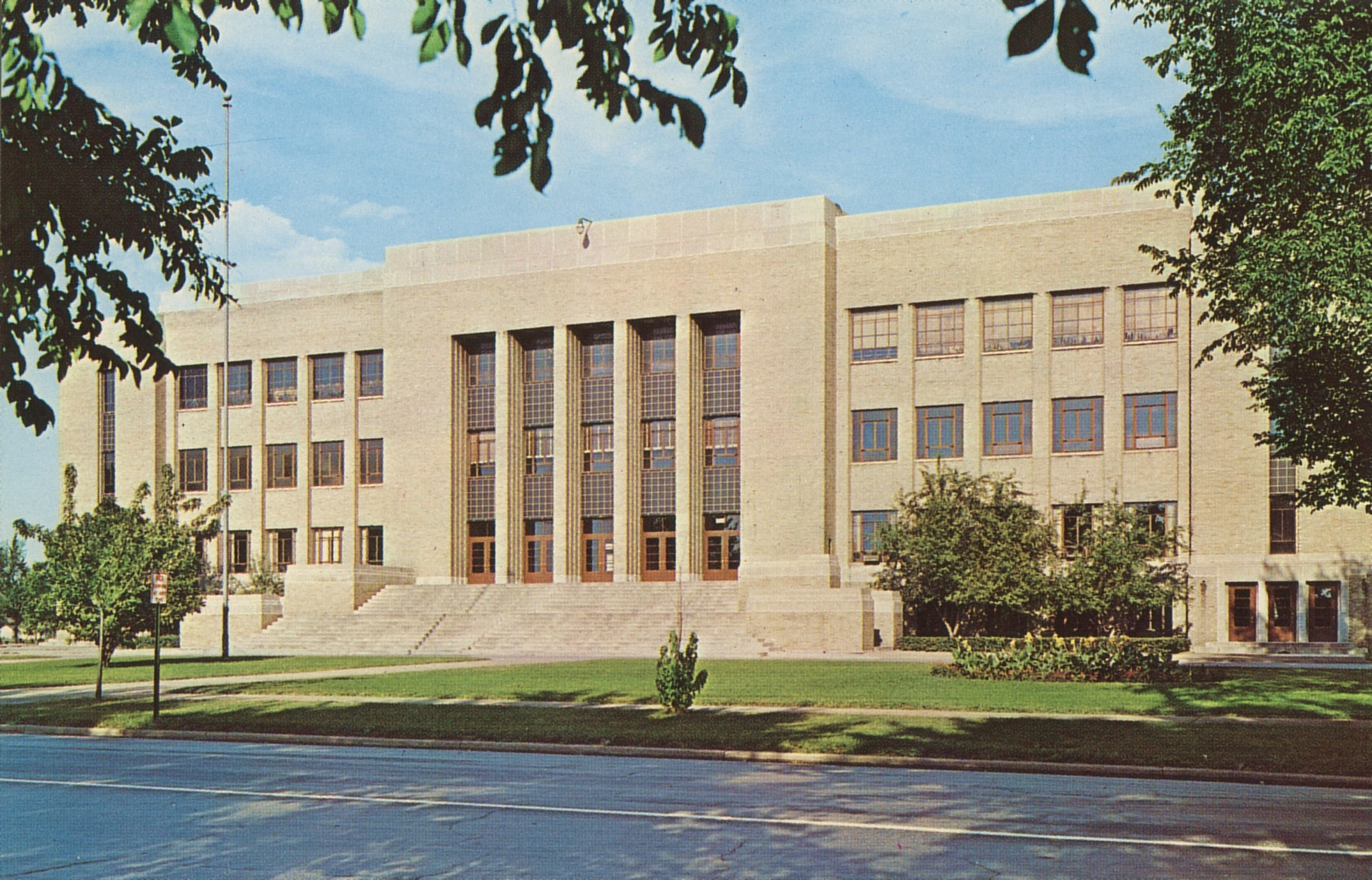
Hammond Civic Center in 1965

Hammond Civic Center is a 4,500-seat multi-purpose arena located in Hammond, Indiana. The arena opened in 1938. It is well known for hosting various local concerts, and sporting events such WWE Wrestling, Impact Wrestling, mixed martial arts fighting and roller derby, for the area. In the 1950s, it played host to a number of neutral-court National Basketball Association games. It is the home arena for the Calumet College of St. Joseph's Crimson Wave basketball and volleyball teams, which play in the Chicagoland Collegiate Athletic Conference. The Civic Center first became known to professional sports fans as the home to the Hammond Rollers of the now defunct American Basketball Association.

American rock band Kiss played at the Civic Center on Easter Sunday in March 1986, causing local church groups to protest the event. During the show, Kiss blew out several windows on the outside west wall of the Civic Center. The sound system they used on this tour was rated at 120 decibels. Before the show, Gene Simmons and Eric Carr of the band walked around the perimeter of the building, trying to hold polite conversations with the church groups. The concert went on as scheduled. Largely due to the church protest controversy, the concert sold only 1,900 tickets.

Concert archives provides an incomplete list of other concerts at the facility https://www.concertarchives.org/venues/hammond-civic-center

The Civic Center plays host to various well-attended professional sporting events. On September 9, 2012, K.O. Sports Promotions hosted a boxing card for a capacity crowd at the Civic Center, with the main event featuring former United States Boxing Organization cruiserweight champion Carl Davis (boxer) in an eight-round heavyweight bout against former number one heavyweight contender Bert Cooper.
