= Delfine Persoon =

Belgian boxer (born 1985)

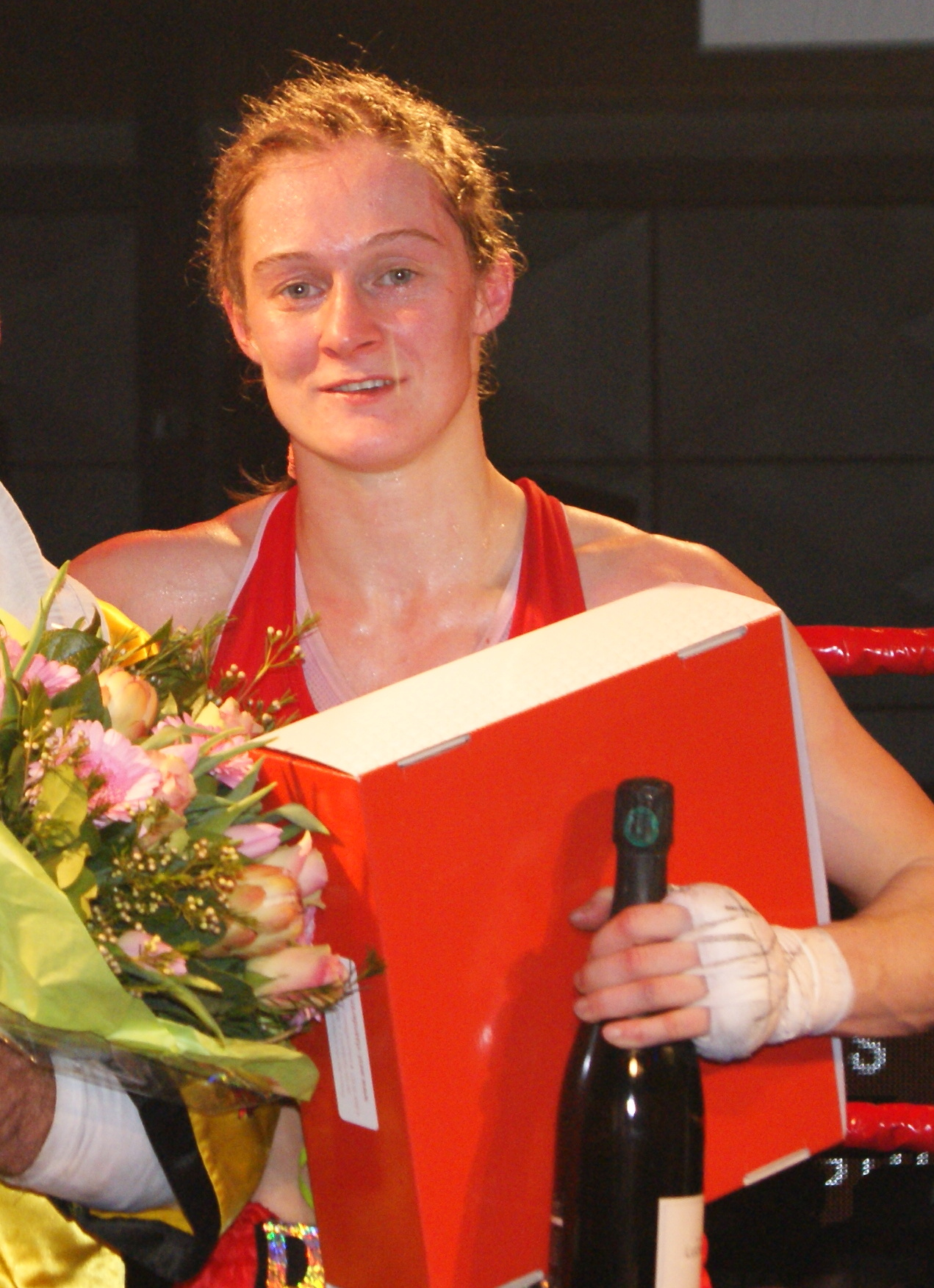
- Persoon in 2013

Personal information
- Born: 14 January 1985 (age 41) Hooglede, West Flanders, Belgium
- Height: 175 cm (5 ft 9 in)
- Weight: Super-featherweight; Lightweight

Boxing career
- Stance: Orthodox

Boxing record
- Total fights: 56
- Wins: 50
- Win by KO: 20
- Losses: 4
- No contests: 2
Medal record
Women's amateur boxing
Representing Belgium
Belgian National Championships
Gold medal – first place	2009 Eupen	Lightweight

Delfine Persoon (Dutch pronunciation: [dɛlˈfinə pərˈsoːn]; born 14 January 1985) is a Belgian professional boxer. She held the IBF female lightweight title in 2012 and the WBC female lightweight title from 2014 to June 2019, losing the title in a unification fight against Katie Taylor for the undisputed lightweight championship.

== Professional boxing career ==
Persoon, who works as a railway policewoman, started professional boxing in 2009, after a career in competitive judo.

In March 2011 she became European female lightweight against Nicole Boss. She successfully defended her title in November 2011 against Myriam Dellal.

In February 2012, Persoon won the WIBF lightweight title with a technical knockout against Lucia Morelli. In September 2012 she added the IBF female lightweight title with a technical knockout against Erin McGowan. In January 2013, she successfully defended her WIBF title against Anita Torti, winning by unanimous decision.

In March 2013, Persoon won a final eliminator against Kremena Petkova by knockout in the second round, gaining the right to challenge Érica Farías for the WBC female lightweight title. In September 2013 she was stripped of the IBF title for inactivity, having failed to defend it in the intervening year.

In December 2013, she won a unification fight with Lucia Morelli for the WIBF and WBF titles.

On 20 April 2014, Persoon won the WBC title by unanimous decision against Farias.

=== Persoon vs. Taylor ===
In December 2018, it was revealed that Persoon offered $100,000 to IBF and WBA champion Katie Taylor for a fight. Taylor's manager however stated that "Taylor would not even get out of bed for this sum." Eventually, a lightweight unification fight between Persoon and Taylor was set for 1 June 2019, at the Madison Square Garden in New York, on the undercard of the Anthony Joshua vs. Andy Ruiz Jr. heavyweight world title fight. In addition to all four sanctioning body's titles being on the line, The Ring magazine belt was also at stake. Persoon's management labelled Taylor's team "totally disrespectful" and claimed "psychological warfare" after a series of late fight week demands. This included forcing Persoon to switch hotels as Taylor was staying in the same hotel, demanding that she take an additional blood test and prove Persoon has exercise asthma. Taylor won a controversial majority decision to become the undisputed lightweight champion.

=== Super-featherweight ===
On 11 November 2019, Persoon won the WBA interim super-featherweight title beating Helen Joseph by unanimous decision.

==== Persoon vs. Taylor II ====
A rematch with Taylor took place on 22 August 2020 at the Matchroom Sport headquarters in Brentwood, Essex, for the undisputed female lightweight title. Persoon lost by unanimous decision.

==== Persoon vs. Baumgardner ====
Persoon challenged Alycia Baumgardner for WBC super-featherweight title on 27 September 2024 in Atlanta, USA. The fight was stopped in the fourth round and ruled a no contest due to a cut Persoon suffered over her right eye from an accidental clash of heads.

==== Persoon vs. Veyre ====
Persoon fought Caroline Veyre for the vacant WBC female super-featherweight title at GLC Live at 20 Monroe in Grand Rapids, Michigan, USA, on 10 February 2026. She lost by unanimous decision.

== Professional boxing record ==
56 fights	50 wins	4 losses
By knockout	20	1
By decision	27	3
By disqualification	3	0
No contests	2	

No.	Result	Record	Opponent	Type	Round, time	Date	Location	Notes
56	Loss	50–4 (2)	Caroline Veyre	UD	10	10 Feb 2026	GLC Live at 20 Monroe in Grand Rapids, Michigan, U S.	For vacant WBC female super-featherweight title
55	Win	50–3 (2)	Ana Maria Lozano	TKO	6 (8), 1:53	22 Jun 2025	Coretec Dome, Oostende, Belgium	
54	NC	49–3 (2)	Alycia Baumgardner	NC	4 (10),	27 Sep 2024	Lux Studios, Atlanta, U.S.	For WBC, IBF, WBO, WBA & The Ring female super featherweight titles; Persoon suffered a cut above her right eye due to a head clash in the fourth round
53	Win	49–3 (1)	Agustina Marisa Belen Rojas	UD	6	1 Nov 2023	Izegem, West-Vlaanderen, Belgium	
52	Win	48–3 (1)	Bo Mi Re Shin	SD	10	28 May 2023	Sportcentrum Van steenland, Torhout, Belgium	Retained WBC Silver female super featherweight title
51	NC	47–3 (1)	Ikram Kerwat	NC	1 (10), 1:06	13 Nov 2022	Coca-Cola Arena, Dubai, UAE	Retained WBC Silver female super featherweight title; Persoon hit Kerwat when she was on the ground following a knockdown
50	Win	47–3	Elhem Mekhaled	UD	10	21 May 2022	Etihad Arena, Abu Dhabi	Won vacant WBC Silver female super featherweight title
49	Win	46–3	Beatriz Aguilar	RTD	4 (8)	1 Nov 2021	Izegem, Belgium	
48	Win	45–3	Elena Gradinar	UD	10	3 Jul 2021	Eernegem, Belgium	Won vacant WBO Intercontinental super featherweight title
47	Loss	44–3	Katie Taylor	UD	10	22 Aug 2020	Matchroom Fight Camp, Brentwood, England	For WBA, WBC, IBF, WBO, and The Ring female lightweight titles
46	Win	44–2	Helen Joseph	UD	10	11 Nov 2019	Versluys Dôme, Ostend, Belgium	Won WBA interim female super-featherweight title
45	Loss	43–2	Katie Taylor	MD	10	1 Jun 2019	Madison Square Garden, New York City, New York, U.S.	Lost WBC female lightweight title; For WBA, IBF, WBO, and inaugural The Ring female lightweight titles
44	Win	43–1	Melissa St. Vil	RTD	7 (10), 2:00	9 Mar 2019	Kortrijk, Belgium	Retained WBC female lightweight title
43	Win	42–1	Judy Waguthii	TKO	10 (10)	8 Dec 2018	Ardooie, Belgium	Retained WBC female lightweight title
42	Win	41–1	Natalia del Valle Aguirre	UD	10	9 Jun 2018	Sportcentrum, Ichtegem, Belgium	Retained WBC female lightweight title
41	Win	40–1	Monica Gentili	UD	8	20 Jan 2018	Moorslede, Belgium	
40	Win	39–1	Myriam Dellal	UD	10	11 Nov 2017	Zwevezele, Belgium	Retained WBC female lightweight title
39	Win	38–1	Everline Odero	DQ	8 (8)	25 Dec 2016	Stedelijke Sporthalle, Izegem, Belgium	
38	Win	37–1	Ruth Stephanie Aquino	DQ	1 (10)	11 Nov 2016	Sporthal De zwaluw, Zwevezele, Belgium	Retained WBC female lightweight title
37	Win	36–1	Christina Linardatou	UD	10	4 Jun 2016	Sporthal Schiervelde, Belgium	Retained WBC female lightweight title
36	Win	35–1	Maïva Hamadouche	UD	10	11 Nov 2015	Zwevezele, Belgium	Retained WBC female lightweight title
35	Win	34–1	Jane Kavulani	UD	8	26 Sep 2015	Gits, Belgium	
34	Win	33–1	Nicole Boss	TKO	9 (10), 0:45	25 Apr 2015	Sternensaal, Bern, Switzerland	Retained WBC female lightweight title
33	Win	32–1	Florence Muthoni	TKO	8 (8)	28 Feb 2015	Ghelamco Arena, Ghent, Belgium	
32	Win	31–1	Diana Prazak	TKO	9 (10), 1:28	11 Nov 2014	Zwevezele, Belgium	Retained WBC female lightweight title
31	Win	30–1	Judy Waguthii	UD	8	27 Sep 2014	Zaal Ogierlande, Gits, Belgium	
30	Win	29–1	Érica Farías	UD	10	20 Apr 2014	Zwevezele, Belgium	Won WBC female lightweight title
29	Win	28–1	Lucia Morelli	TKO	10 (10), 1:19	13 Dec 2013	Zaal Forum, Aalst, Belgium	Retained WIBF lightweight title; Won WIBA, and WBF female lightweight titles
28	Win	27–1	Eva Bajic	TKO	3 (8)	11 Nov 2013	Zwevezele, Belgium	
27	Win	26–1	Irma Balijagic Adler	UD	8	4 Oct 2013	Topsporthal Vlaanderen, Ghent, Belgium	
26	Win	25–1	Galina Gumliiska	TKO	2 (8)	23 Aug 2013	Kursaal, Ostend, Belgium	
25	Win	24–1	Kremena Petkova	KO	2 (10)	29 Mar 2013	Topsporthal Vlaanderen, Ghent, Belgium	
24	Win	23–1	Fatuma Zarika	UD	8	23 Feb 2013	Sporthal Schiervelde, Roeselare, Belgium	
23	Win	22–1	Anita Torti	UD	10	12 Jan 2013	Sporthal Sint Pieter, Sint Truiden, Belgium	Retained WIBF lightweight title
22	Win	21–1	Marianna Gulyas	KO	3 (6)	1 Nov 2012	Sporthal, Izegem, Belgium	
21	Win	20–1	Erin McGowan	TKO	7 (10), 1:48	21 Sep 2012	Lotto Arena, Antwerp, Belgium	Won vacant IBF female lightweight title
20	Win	19–1	Valija Lasmanovica	TKO	3 (6)	29 Jun 2012	Moorslede, Belgium	
19	Win	18–1	Loli Munoz	UD	8	27 Apr 2012	Topsporthal Vlaanderen, Ghent, Belgium	
18	Win	17–1	Lucia Morelli	TKO	5 (10)	25 Feb 2012	Expo-Hallen, Roeselare, Belgium	Won WIBF lightweight title
17	Win	16–1	Myriam Dellal	UD	10	1 Nov 2011	Stedelijke Sporthalle, Izegem, Belgium	Retained European female lightweight title
16	Win	15–1	Angel McKenzie	UD	6	30 Sep 2011	Topsporthal Vlaanderen, Ghent, Belgium	
15	Win	14–1	Milena Koleva	UD	8	24 Jun 2011	Feesttent, Torhout, Belgium	
14	Win	13–1	Floarea Lihet	UD	6	1 Apr 2011	Topsporthal Vlaanderen, Ghent, Belgium	
13	Win	12–1	Nicole Boss	UD	10	5 Mar 2011	Sporthal, Lichtervelde, Belgium	Won vacant European female lightweight title
12	Win	11–1	Daniela David	RTD	3 (6)	25 Dec 2010	Stedelijke Sporthalle, Izegem, Belgium	
11	Win	10–1	Mirabela Calugareanu	KO	2 (6)	10 Dec 2010	Grote Markt, Sint Niklaas, Belgium	
10	Loss	9–1	Zelda Tekin	TKO	4 (8)	1 Nov 2010	Stedelijke Sporthalle, Izegem, Belgium	
9	Win	9–0	Zelda Tekin	DQ	2 (6)	9 Oct 2010	Sporthal De Branding, Middelkerke, Belgium	
8	Win	8–0	Kristine Shergold	UD	8	11 Sep 2010	Studio hall, Bruges, Belgium	
7	Win	7–0	Nicky Mutsaert	KO	2 (6)	24 May 2010	Brielpoort, Deinze, Belgium	
6	Win	6–0	Arlene de Freitas	UD	6	30 Apr 2010	Sporthal Tempelhof, Bruges, Belgium	
5	Win	5–0	Julie Robert	UD	8	6 Mar 2010	Zaal Ogierlande, Oostkamp, Belgium	
4	Win	4–0	Arlene de Freitas	UD	6	5 Dec 2009	BC Noble Art, Deinze, Belgium	
3	Win	3–0	Mariska Mulder	TKO	2 (6)	21 Nov 2009	Sporthal Riderfort, Oostkamp, Belgium	
2	Win	2–0	Renáta Szebelédi	UD	6	4 Oct 2009	Olympia Stadion, Marke, Belgium	
1	Win	1–0	Jana Latova	KO	2 (6)	23 May 2008	Zaal Ogierlande, Gits, Belgium	

== Awards ==
- Vlaamse Reus in 2014.
- Belgian Sportsman of the year in 2015.

Sporting positions
Major World boxing titles
Inaugural champion	IBF female lightweight champion 21 September 2012 – 2013; Vacated	Vacant Title next held by Victoria Bustos
Preceded by Érica Farías	WBC female lightweight champion 20 April 2014 – 1 June 2019	Succeeded by Katie Taylor
