= Esmeralda Moreno =

Mexican boxer

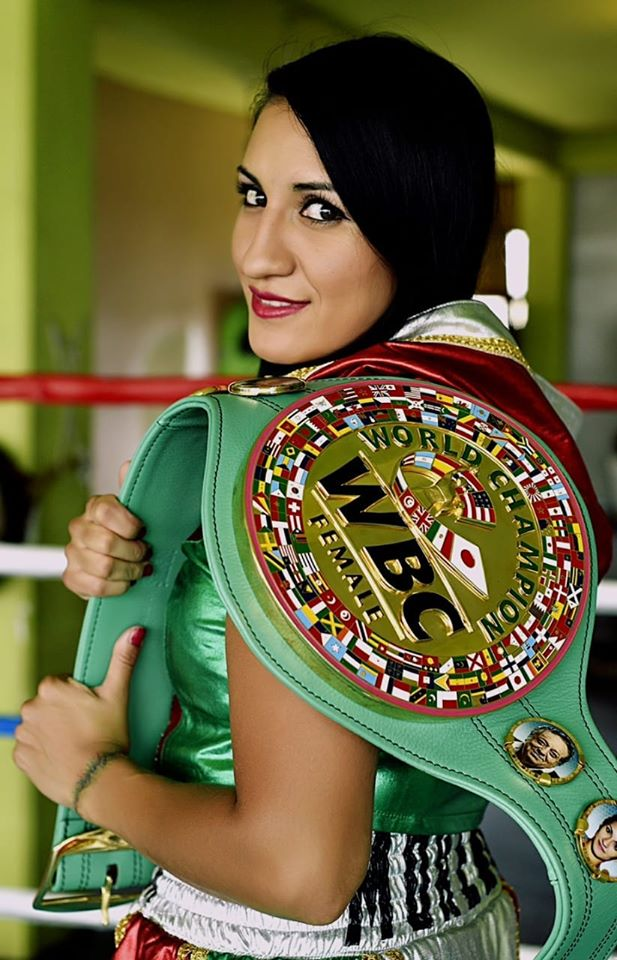
- Esmeralda Moreno

Personal information
- Nickname: La Joya
- Born: 7 July 1987 (age 38) Chimalhuacán, Mexico, Mexico
- Weight: Light flyweight; Super flyweight

Boxing career

Boxing record
- Total fights: 49
- Wins: 35
- Win by KO: 11
- Losses: 12
- Draws: 2

Esmeralda Moreno (born 7 July 1987) is a Mexican professional boxer. She is a two-time WBC female light flyweight champion and a one-time IBO super flyweight champion.

== Professional career ==
=== 2000s ===
On 20 April 2005, Moreno made her first bout with Clara Pérez in Mexico City, winning on a unanimous decision and celebrating her debut match with a white star. On 7 June 2006, she fought against Mayela Pérez in Ciudad Nezahualcóyotl, winning in the sixth round via TKO, her first professional KO win. On 30 March 2007, she fought against Susana Vázquez in Tepic for the Mexican women's bantamweight championship, losing her first title bout. On 2 August, she lost a non-title bout against Ibeth Zamora Silva in Mexico City by split decision. On 14 September, she fought a provisional Mexican women's bantamweight title match against Magaly Avalos in Tepic, where she won in round eight via TKO and succeeded in winning the title. On 30 November in Karlsruhe, Germany, she fought against GBU women's super flyweight champion Alesia Graf in her first overseas match, losing by UD in 10 rounds.

On 23 February 2008, Moreno defeated Ibeth Zamora at San Cristóbal Huichochitlán in a 2-0 decision and rematched for the first time in six months. On 30 August, she fought Ana Maria Torres for the WBC women's super flyweight interim championship at the Arena Monterrey in Monterrey, where she lost by UD. On 29 November, she faced WBC women's international flyweight champion Mariana Juárez at Arena México in Mexico City, losing by UD. On 27 June 2009, she fought Anahí Torres for the Mexican women's light flyweight interim championship in Texcoco and succeeded in winning the title by UD. On 23 August, she fought against Susana Morales in Mexico City, winning via KO and successfully defending her title for the first time. On 24 October, she won the WBC youth female minimumweight championship in Morelia having defeated Mayela Pérez by UD to win the title.

=== 2010s ===
On 13 February 2010, Moreno fought Carolina Montenegro for WBC Youth Female Light Flyweight Championship bout, which was held in Ciudad Nezahualcóyotl, winning in round four via KO. On 12 March, she faced Simona Galassi for the WBC women's light flyweight championship in Bertinoro, losing by unanimous decision. On 15 May, she fought against Abigail Villar in Chicoloapan, Mexico, winning in the sixth round via TKO and successfully defending the youth female light flyweight title for the first time. She then defended this title against Yesenia Martinez Castrejon, Marcela Quintello and Linda Sánchez.

Moreno then fought Jessica Chávez for the Mexican interim, and WBC Silver female light flyweight titles on 19 February 2011 at the Deportivo Trabajadores del Metro in Iztacalco, Mexico. Moreno won the bout by UD, with all three judges scoring it 98–92. She then defended the belt against Maribel Ramírez, Maria Salinas, Linda Sánchez, Yesenia Martinez Castrejon and Guadalupe Bautista.

On 23 June 2012, Moreno fought against WBC female light flyweight champion Naomi Togashi, winning via UD and succeeding in winning her first world title. On 14 January 2013, she was designated "Champion In Recess" by the WBC due to her pregnancy.

Moreno faced Silva for the WBC female light flyweight title once again on 22 April 2017 at Unidad Deportiva Martín Alarcón in Metepec, Mexico. Two judges scored the bout 95–94 and 96–93 in favour of Moreno while the third scored it 96–93 to Silva.

On 19 May 2018, Moreno fought Yesenia Gómez at the Poliforum in Playa del Carmen, Mexico. She retained her title through a majority draw, with two judges scoring the bout even at 95–95 while the third scored it 97–93 in favour of Gómez. She would get an immediate rematch with Gómez on 22 September at the Grand Oasis Arena. Gómez defeated Moreno via MD to capture the WBC female light flyweight title. Two judges scored the bout in favour of Gómez with 97–93 and 96–94, while the third judge scored it even at 95–95.
