= Licia Boudersa =

French boxer (born 1992)

Personal information
- Nationality: (France) French
- Born: 28 July 1992 (age 33)
- Weight: Featherweight, Super-featherweight, Lightweight

Boxing career

Boxing record
- Wins: 24
- Win by KO: 4
- Losses: 4
- Draws: 2
- No contests: 1

Licia Boudersa (born 28 July 1992) is a French professional boxer. In her ninth professional fight, she won the vacant European female featherweight title, defeating the previously unbeaten Ericka Rousseau on a unanimous decision at Palais des Sports Saint-Sauveur in Lille, France, on 21 January 2017. Returning to the same venue, Boudersa became WBF female super-featherweight champion with a seventh round technical knockout win over Hasna Tukic on 29 September 2018. Just less than a year later, on 28 September 2019, and once again at Palais des Sports Saint-Sauveur, she beat Laura Soledad Griffa by unanimous decision to take the vacant IBO female featherweight title.

On 17 May 2023, Boudersa became a two-time WBF female super-featherweight champion by defeating Agustina Marisa Belen Rojas via unanimous decision at Casino Barriere in Lille. She challenged IBF female lightweight champion Beatriz Ferreira at Salle des Étoiles in Monte Carlo on 14 December 2024, but lost on a unanimous decision.

Boudersa faced Caroline Veyre for the vacant WBC Silver female featherweight title at Little Caesars Arena in Detroit, Michigan, USA, on 26 July 2025, as part of the undercard for the Claressa Shields vs Lani Daniels undisputed female heavyweight championship fight. She lost by unanimous decision.
