= Vissia Trovato =

Italian boxer (born 1983)

Personal information
- Nickname: Leonessa
- Born: 25 January 1983 (age 43) Milan, Italy
- Height: 160 cm (5 ft 3 in)
- Weight: Featherweight, Super-bantamweight

Boxing career
- Stance: Orthodox

Boxing record
- Total fights: 15
- Wins: 12
- Win by KO: 5
- Losses: 3

Vissia Trovato (born 25 January 1983) is an Italian former professional boxer. She won the vacant European female featherweight title by defeating Renata Domsodi via technical knockout in the fifth round at Palestra Nuova in Ascona, Switzerland, on 11 June 2016. Trovato became IBO female super-bantamweight champion on 5 November 2016, beating Galina Ivanova by unanimous decision to win the vacant title at Palestra Nuova. She challenged WBC and WBA female featherweight champion, Jelena Mrdjenovich, at Edmonton Convention Centre in Edmonton, Alberta, Canada, on 22 June 2019, but lost by unanimous decision.
