= Viviane Obenauf =

Brazilian boxer (born 1986)

Personal information
- Born: 25 October 1986 (age 39) Rio de Janeiro, Brazil
- Height: 5 ft 5 in (165 cm)
- Weight: Super featherweight; Lightweight

Boxing career
- Stance: Orthodox

Boxing record
- Total fights: 20
- Wins: 14
- Win by KO: 7
- Losses: 6

Viviane Obenauf (born 25 October 1986) is a Brazilian former professional boxer who competed from 2014 to 2019. She has challenged three times for world titles; the IBO female lightweight title in 2017; the IBF female super featherweight title in 2018; and the IBO female super featherweight title in 2019.

In 2022, Obenauf was convicted of murder in the violent assault of her 61-year-old husband.

== Professional career ==
=== Lightweight ===
Obenauf made her professional debut on 21 April 2014 at the EXPO Thun in Thun, Switzerland, scoring a four-round unanimous decision victory over Amra Okugic.

In her eleventh fight, with a record of 9–1 (2 KO), she faced former Olympic gold medalist Katie Taylor on 10 December 2016 at the Manchester Arena, Manchester, in Taylor's second professional bout. The fight was televised live on Sky Sports Box Office as part of the undercard for the Anthony Joshua vs. Éric Molina heavyweight world title fight. Obenauf lost via points decision over six rounds. Obenauf attempted to establish herself as the aggressor from the opening bell, but the former Olympic champion used her defence to evade Obenauf's attacks and began stalking her around the ring while staying behind the jab, fighting in spurts and landing combination punches to the head and body. In the second round, Obenauf touched the canvas as the result of a counter left hook, but immediately rose to her feet to protest the referee scoring a knockdown. Obenauf had a moment of success in the third, catching Taylor with a right hook and a straight left that sent her opponent stumbling off-balance. In the fourth, Obenauf was on the receiving end of Taylor's sharp jabs and fast combinations. Taylor began landing her speedy combinations with more frequency in the fifth, a round which saw Obenauf receive a cut above the left eye from an accidental clash of heads. A bloodied Obenauf saw out the final bell in round six to receive the second defeat of her professional career.

Her next fight came on 25 March 2017, against Maja Milenkovic at the Congress Center in Interlaken, Switzerland. Obenauf won the fight with an eighth round technical knockout (TKO) to capture the vacant WBF International female lightweight title.

Three months later, she fought undefeated former WBO interim super featherweight champion Ewa Brodnicka on 24 June 2017, at the Ergo Arena in Gdańsk, Poland. Obenauf suffered the third defeat of her career, losing via split decision over ten rounds, with two judges scoring the bout 96–93 and 95–94 in favour of Brodnicka while the third scored it 95–94 to Obenauf.

After winning her next two fights, she then fought undefeated British prospect Chantelle Cameron on 2 December 2017, at the Leicester Arena in Leicester, England, for the vacant IBO female lightweight title. Obenauf lost the fight via sixth round corner retirement (RTD) after Obenauf's corner withdrew her from the contest between rounds, suffering the first stoppage loss of her career.

=== Super featherweight ===
Following the defeat to Cameron, Obenauf fought another undefeated British prospect in Natasha Jonas, for Jonas' WBA International female super featherweight title, on 4 August 2018 at the Ice Arena Wales in Cardiff, Wales. Obenauf scored an upset victory with a fourth-round TKO. Obenauf came out swinging from the opening bell, smothering the former Olympian with combinations to the head and landing a few clean, straight right hands. Jonas came back in the second, landing her own clean punches. In the final 40 seconds of round three, following an onslaught by Obenauf which culminated in a straight right hand, Jonas was dropped to the canvas. After seeing her opponent struggle back to her feet before the referee's count of ten, Obenauf unleashed a barrage of punches on Jonas, again ending with a right hand to put the British fighter down for a second time. Obenauf came out in the fourth employing the same tactics, walking Jonas down and throwing big shots. Halfway through the round, Obenauf landed another big right hand to put Jonas down for the third time. With Jonas' back against the ropes, Obenauf landed a right-left combination that caused her opponent's legs to buckle, with the referee on the verge of intervening. Obenauf landed another left hook that made Jonas sag into the ropes, at which point referee Michael Alexander stepped in and waved off the fight as Jonas' trainer Joe Gallagher threw in the towel with 18 seconds of the round remaining.

In her next fight she challenged IBF female super featherweight champion Maïva Hamadouche on 4 December 2018 at Zénith de Paris-La Villette in Paris, France. Obenauf lost in her first challenge of a major world title via fifth round RTD.

After defeating Monika Antonik in April 2019 via unanimous decision over six rounds, Obenauf challenged for her second super featherweight world title against reigning champion Terri Harper on 2 November 2019 at the Manchester Arena, with the IBO title on the line. The fight was on the undercard of the WBO super lightweight title fight between Christina Linardatou and Katie Taylor. Obenauf lost the fight via unanimous decision, with the judges' scorecards reading 97–93, 99–92 and 99–91.

== Life after boxing ==
After losing to Terri Harper in November 2019, Obenauf retired from boxing. Following her retirement she briefly worked in the food and beverage industry before opening her own gym in Switzerland.

In December 2020, she was arrested in connection with the death of her 61-year-old husband who was found dead in their Swiss home after allegedly being the victim of a "sustained violent assault", suffering "serious injuries" caused by a blunt object. In December 2022, Obenauf was found guilty of murder and sentenced to 16 years in prison. She also received a 12-year ban from the country. Viviane Obenauf appealed against the verdict. The appeal hearing before the Bern High Court took place in February 2024. The court upheld the murder conviction, increased the sentence to 18 years' imprisonment and extended the expulsion order to 14 years. In 2025, the Federal Supreme Court upheld the verdict in the final instance, making it legally binding. She is serving her sentence in Hindelbank Prison.

== Professional boxing record ==
20 fights	14 wins	6 losses
By knockout	7	2
By decision	7	4

No.	Result	Record	Opponent	Type	Round, time	Date	Location	Notes
20	Loss	14–6	(United Kingdom) Terri Harper	UD	10	2 Nov 2019	(United Kingdom) Manchester Arena, Manchester, England	For IBO super featherweight title
19	Win	14–5	(Poland) Monika Antonik	UD	6	27 Apr 2019	Aula Interlaken, Interlaken, Switzerland	
18	Loss	13–5	(France) Maïva Hamadouche	RTD	5 (10), 2:00	4 Dec 2018	Zénith de Paris-La Villette, Paris, France	For IBF female super featherweight title
17	Win	13–4	(United Kingdom) Natasha Jonas	TKO	4 (10), 1:42	4 Aug 2018	(United Kingdom) Ice Arena Wales, Cardiff, Wales	Won WBA International female super featherweight title
16	Loss	12–4	(United Kingdom) Chantelle Cameron	RTD	6 (10), 2:00	2 Dec 2017	(United Kingdom) Leicester Arena, Leicester, England	For vacant IBO female lightweight title
15	Win	12–3	(Poland) Sylwia Maksym	TKO	5 (6)	7 Oct 2017	Bern, Switzerland	
14	Win	11–3	(Kenya) Consolata Musanga	UD	6	1 Jul 2017	Kultur Casino, Bern, Switzerland	
13	Loss	10–3	(Poland) Ewa Brodnicka	SD	10	24 Jun 2017	Ergo Arena, Gdańsk, Poland	
12	Win	10–2	(Serbia) Maja Milenkovic	TKO	8 (10)	25 Mar 2017	Congress Center, Interlaken, Switzerland	Won vacant WBF International female lightweight title
11	Loss	9–2	(Republic of Ireland) Katie Taylor	PTS	6	10 Dec 2016	(United Kingdom) Manchester Arena, Manchester, England	
10	Win	9–1	(Poland) Karina Kopinska	UD	6	1 Oct 2016	Kubus, Bern, Switzerland	
9	Win	8–1	(Poland) Klaudia Szymczak	KO	1 (6)	9 Sep 2016	Frestdorf des Alpes, Interlaken, Switzerland	
8	Win	7–1	(Poland) Bojana Libiszewska	UD	4	27 Feb 2016	Matteturnhalle, Bern, Switzerland	
7	Loss	6–1	(Italy) Vissia Trovato	UD	6	7 Nov 2015	Puestra Nuova, Ascona, Switzerland	
6	Win	6–0	(Serbia) Semra Bogucanin	TKO	5 (6)	30 May 2015	Barensaal, Worb, Switzerland	
5	Win	5–0	(Greece) Kallia Kourouni	UD	6	6 Apr 2015	EXPO Thun, Thun, Switzerland	
4	Win	4–0	(Bulgaria) Luchiya Doncheva	TKO	3 (6)	26 Dec 2014	Kursaal, Bern, Switzerland	
3	Win	3–0	(Hungary) Zsofia Bedo	KO	2 (6)	1 Nov 2014	Matteturnhalle, Bern, Switzerland	
2	Win	2–0	(Poland) Bojana Libiszewska	UD	4	9 Jun 2014	Seminar Hotel Lueg, Burgdorf, Switzerland	
1	Win	1–0	(Bosnia and Herzegovina) Amra Okugic	UD	4	21 Apr 2014	EXPO Thun, Thun, Switzerland	
