= Lucy Wildheart =

Swedish boxer (born 1993)

Personal information
- Born: 1 January 1993 (age 33) Lessebo, Sweden
- Height: 167 cm (5 ft 6 in)
- Weight: Lightweight, Featherweight

Boxing career
- Stance: Orthodox

Boxing record
- Total fights: 14
- Wins: 11
- Win by KO: 4
- Losses: 3

Lucy Wildheart (born 1 January 1993) is a Swedish professional boxer. She is a three-time world title challenger.

== Biography ==
Wildheart was born and raised in Lessebo, Sweden. A former ballet dancer and karate player, she had an amateur record of 24 wins from 27 fights before turning professional in 2017 and moving to England to train full-time.

She won the vacant IBO female Intercontinental lightweight title by defeating Anissa Benyoub on a split decision in Bracknell, England, on 17 March 2019.

Wildheart took on Estelle Mossely for the vacant IBO female lightweight title in Cherbourg, France, on 14 June 2019, but lost by unanimous decision.

On 15 April 2023, she fought Mikaela Mayer for the vacant WBC interim female lightweight title at the Copper Box Arena in London. She took the fight with one day's notice as a replacement for Mayer's original opponent, Christina Linardatou, who failed her pre-fight medical. Wildheart lost by unanimous decision.

Wildheart had a third attempt at winning a world title when she faced WBC interim female featherweight champion Skye Nicolson at 3Arena in Dublin, Ireland, on 25 November 2023. She again fell short with the fight ending in the ninth round when her corner threw in the towel.
