= Sandy Ryan =

English boxer (born 1993)

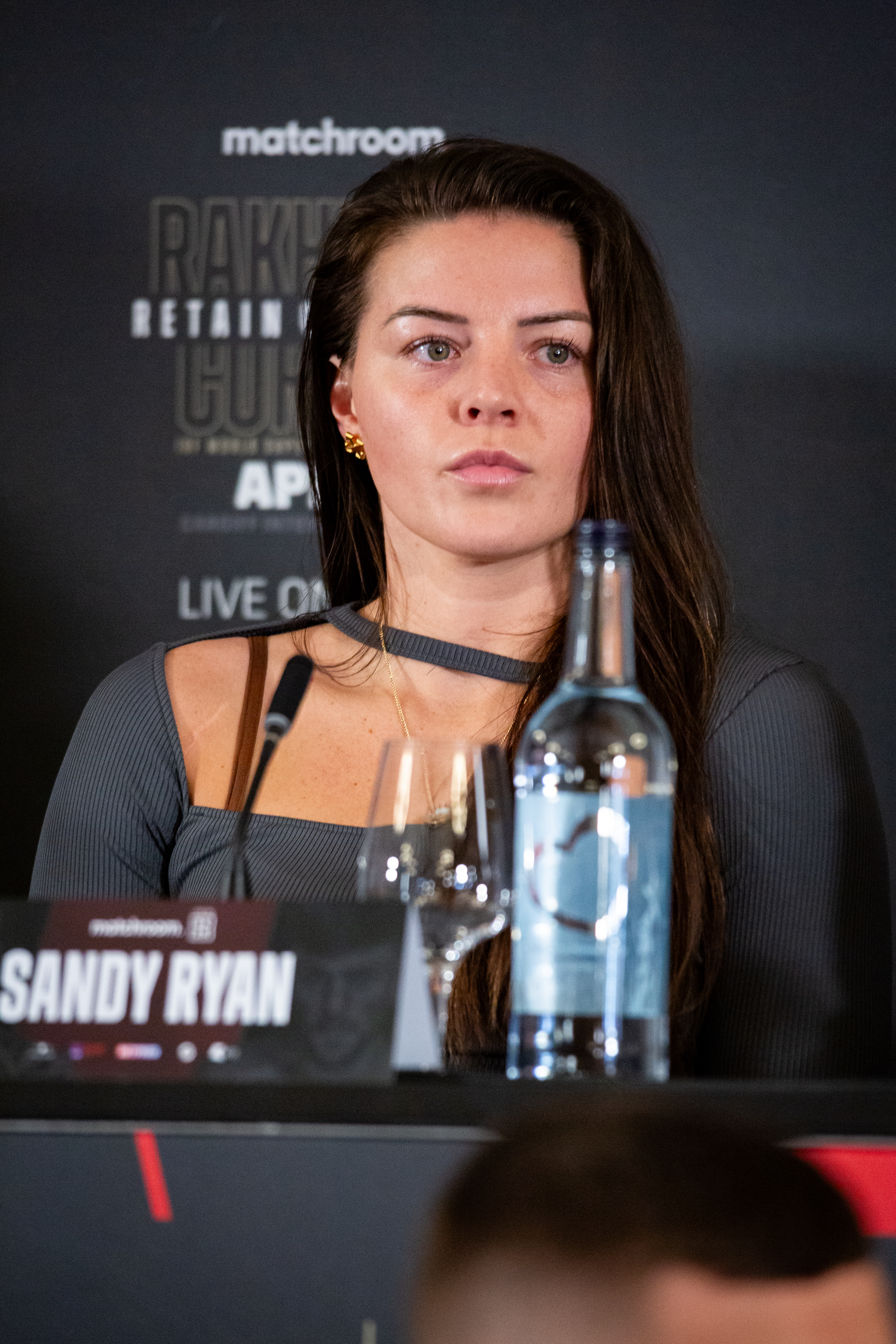

Personal information
- Born: 16 September 1993 (age 33) Derby, England
- Height: 5 ft 8 1/2 in (174 cm)
- Weight: Light welterweight; Welterweight

Boxing career
- Reach: 67 1/2 in (171 cm)
- Stance: Orthodox

Boxing record
- Total fights: 13
- Wins: 9
- Win by KO: 3
- Losses: 3
- Draws: 1
Medal record
Women's Amateur boxing
Representing Great Britain
European Games
Bronze medal – third place	2015 Baku	Light welterweight
Representing England
World Championships
Silver medal – second place	2014 Jeju City	Light welterweight
European Championships
Bronze medal – third place	2016 Sofia	Lightweight
Commonwealth Games
Gold medal – first place	2018 Gold Coast	Welterweight

Sandy Ryan (born 16 September 1993) is an English professional boxer who is a two-weight world champion. She held the WBC female light-welterweight title in 2026 and was WBO female welterweight title holder from April 2023 until September 2024.

== Amateur career ==
On her senior championship debut in 2014, she won a World Championship silver medal.

Representing England, Ryan won a gold medal at the 2018 Commonwealth Games in Australia beating Rosie Eccles from Wales by split decision (3:2) in the welterweight final.

In 2019 Ryan was selected to compete at the World Championships in Ulan-Ude, Russia, where she lost by split decision (4:1) to Christina Desmond in the round of 32.

== Professional career ==
In 2021 it was confirmed that Ryan has agreed terms to turn professional with Matchroom Sport. She made her pro-debut on 31 July 2021 defeating Kirstie Bavington on points in a six-round contest held at Matchroom HQ Garden in Brentwood, England.

=== Ryan vs Pier Houle ===
On April 22, 2023 at Cardiff International Arena in Cardiff, Wales, Ryan defeated Marie Pier Houle by unanimous decision and earned the vacant WBO welterweight title.

=== Ryan vs McCaskill ===
On September 23, 2023 at Caribe Royale in Orlando, Florida, Ryan faced Jessica McCaskill in the welterweight championship unification. The fight ended in a split draw.

=== Ryan vs Harper ===
On 23 March 2024 in Sheffield, England, Ryan defeated Terri Harper via fourth-round retirement and retained her WBO welterweight title.

=== Ryan vs Mayer ===
Ryan was scheduled to defend her WBO welterweight title against Mikaela Mayer in New York on 27 September 2024. She lost the fight by majority decision. On the day of the fight, while leaving to the event, she was hit by a tin of paint at her hotel. Two days after the fight Ryan demanded an immediate rematch in light of the paint incident and alleged threats against her and her support team.

==== Ryan vs. Mayer 2 ====
Ryan faced Mikaela Mayer in a rematch for the WBO welterweight title at Fontainebleau in Las Vegas on 29 March 2025. She lost by unanimous decision.

==== Ryan vs. Grierson ====
Ryan got back to winning ways in her next fight, defeating the previously unbeaten Jade Grierson by unanimous decision at Rainton Meadows Arena in Houghton-le-Spring on 6 September 2025.

==== Ryan vs. Zamora ====
Ryan became a two-weight world champion when she defeated Karla Ramos Zamora via majority decision to win the vacant WBC female light-welterweight title at Nottingham Arena on 21 February 2026. The judges' scorecards were 97–93, 97–93 and 95–95.

Ryan vacated the title in June 2026 without making any defences after announcing she was pregnant with the WBC designating her champion in recess.

== Professional boxing record ==
13 fights	9 wins	3 losses
By knockout	3	0
By decision	6	3
Draws	1	

No.	Result	Record	Opponent	Type	Round, time	Date	Location	Notes
13	Win	9–3–1	Karla Ramos Zamora	MD	10	21 Feb 2026	Nottingham Arena, Nottingham, England	Won vacant WBC light-welterweight title
12	Win	8–3–1	Jade Grierson	UD	10	6 Sep 2025	Rainton Meadows Arena, Houghton-le-Spring, England	
11	Loss	7–3–1	Mikaela Mayer	UD	10	29 Mar 2025	Fontainebleau, Las Vegas, Nevada, US	For the WBO female welterweight title
10	Loss	7–2–1	Mikaela Mayer	MD	10	27 Sep 2024	The Theater at Madison Square Garden, New York City, New York, US	Lost WBO welterweight title
9	Win	7–1–1	Terri Harper	RTD	4 (10), 2:00	23 Mar 2024	Sheffield Arena, Sheffield, England	Retained WBO welterweight title
8	Draw	6–1–1	Jessica McCaskill	SD	10	23 Sep 2023	Caribe Royale Orlando, Orlando, Florida, U.S.	Retained WBO welterweight title; For WBA, WBC, IBO and The Ring welterweight titles
7	Win	6–1	Marie Pier Houle	UD	10	22 Apr 2023	Cardiff International Arena Cardiff, Wales	Won vacant WBO welterweight title
6	Win	5–1	Anahí Ester Sánchez	UD	10	26 Nov 2022	Wembley Arena, Wembley, England	Retained WBC International light-welterweight title
5	Win	4–1	Erica Farias	UD	10	6 Aug 2022	Sheffield Arena, Sheffield, England	Won vacant WBC International light-welterweight title
4	Loss	3–1	Erica Farias	SD	10	12 Mar 2022	Nottingham Arena, Nottingham, England	
3	Win	3–0	Maria Capriolo	TKO	3 (8), 1:11	18 Dec 2021	Manchester Arena, Manchester, England	
2	Win	2–0	Aleksandra Vujovic	KO	4 (6)	1 Oct 2021	Allianz Cloud, Milan, Italy	
1	Win	1–0	Kirstie Bavington	PTS	6	31 Jul 2021	Matchroom HQ Garden, Brentwood, England	

== Honours ==
She was awarded the Freedom of the City of Derby on 25 March 2024.

== See also ==
- List of female boxers

Sporting positions
Regional boxing titles
Vacant Title last held by Cherrelle Brown	WBC International light-welterweight champion 6 August 2022 – 22 April 2023; Won world title	Vacant Title next held by Hélène Connart
World boxing titles
Vacant Title last held by Jessica McCaskill	WBO welterweight champion 22 April 2023 – 27 September 2024	Succeeded by Mikaela Mayer
Vacant Title last held by Katie Taylor	WBC light-welterweight champion 21 February 2026 – present	Incumbent
