= Mikaela Mayer =

American boxer (born 1990)

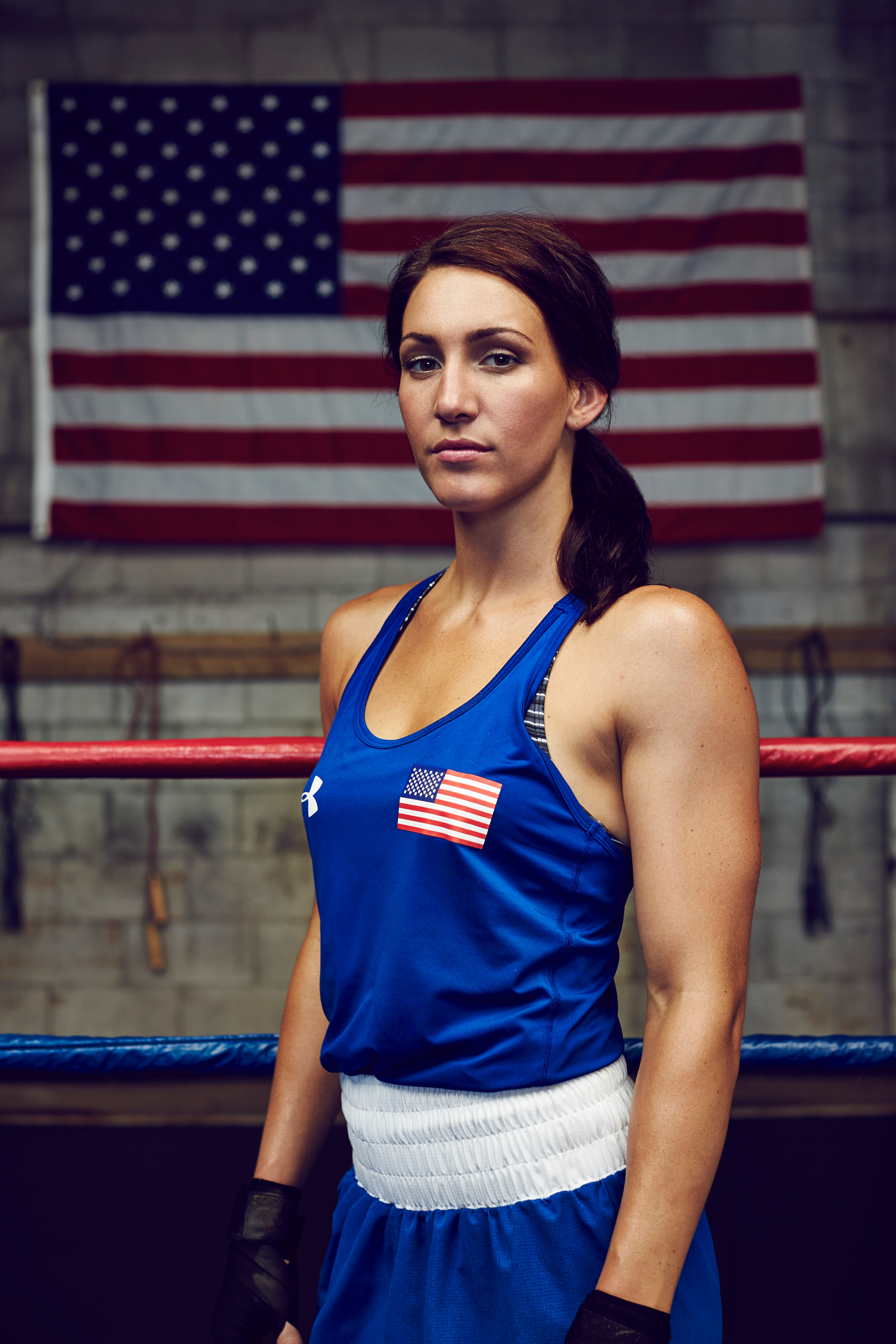
- Mayer in 2016

Personal information
- Born: Mikaela Joslin Mayer; July 4, 1990 (age 36) Los Angeles, California, U.S.
- Height: 5 ft 9 in (175 cm)
- Weight: Super featherweight; Lightweight; Welterweight; Light middleweight

Boxing career
- Reach: 66 1/2 in (169 cm)
- Stance: Orthodox

Boxing record
- Total fights: 25
- Wins: 22
- Win by KO: 5
- Losses: 3
Medal record
Women's Amateur boxing
Representing United States
World Championships
Bronze medal – third place	2012 Qinhuangdao	Light welterweight

Mikaela Joslin Mayer (born July 4, 1990) is an American professional boxer who has held world championships in three weight classes. She has held the WBO female welterweight title since September 2024 and was previously unified female super-welterweight and super-featherweight champion. As an amateur, she won a bronze medal at the 2012 World Championships and competed for the U.S. at the 2016 Olympics.

In 2025, Mayer was named Sports Illustrated's Female Fighter of the Year.

== Amateur career ==
Mayer competed internationally as part of Team USA in the women's 60 kg category at the 2016 Rio Summer Olympics. She defeated Jennifer Chieng in the Round of 16 before being eliminated in the quarterfinal by Russian Anastasia Belyakova, who took a majority decision.

=== Amateur accolades ===
- 2016 AIBA Americas Qualifier: Gold Medalist, Lightweight 60 kg (132 lb)
- 2016 Olympic Trials Champion
- 2015 USA Boxing National Champion 60 kg (132 lb)
- 2014 USA Boxing National Champion 60 kg (132 lb)
- 2012 AIBA Women's World Boxing Championships: Bronze Medalist, Light welterweight 64 kg (141 lb)
- 2012 AMBC Continental Championships: Gold Medalist 64 kg (141 lb)
- 2012 USA Boxing National Champion 64 kg (141 lb)
- 2012 U.S. Olympic Team Trials: Runner-Up 60 kg (132 lb)
- 2011 National Golden Gloves: Champion 60 kg (132 lb)

== Professional career ==
After signing a promotional deal with Top Rank, Mayer made her professional debut on 5 August 2017, defeating Widnelly Figueroa by first-round knockout.

Mayer beat Ewa Brodnicka by unanimous decision to win the WBO female super-featherweight World title at the MGM Grand in Las Vegas on 31 October 2020. Her Polish opponent had been reigning champion but was stripped of the belt after failing to make the 130-pound weight limit.

On 5 November 2021, she took on IBF female super-featherweight World champion Maïva Hamadouche in a contest that saw both women's titles and the inaugural Ring female super-featherweight belt on the line. Mayer prevailed by unanimous decision.

Seeking to further unify the division, Mayer faced WBC and IBO champion Alycia Baumgardner in London, England, on 15 October 2022. She lost via split decision with judges John Latham and Steve Gray making Baumgardner the winner, both scoring the fight 96-95, while Terry O’Connor gave it to Mayer 97-93.

Mayer switched to lightweight for her next outing where she was scheduled to face Christina Linardatou on 15 April 2023, but the Greek boxer failed her pre-fight medical. Sweden's Lucy Wildheart stepped in as a last-minute replacement with Mayer winning by unanimous decision to became the interim WBC female lightweight World champion.

=== Mayer vs. Jonas ===
Another change in weight division saw Mayer challenge IBF female welterweight World champion Natasha Jonas in Liverpool, England, on 20 January 2024. After a closely fought contest, it was the English boxer who came out on top winning by split decision with judge Diana Drews Milano scoring the fight for Mayer 97-93 but Frank Lombardi (96-94) and Michael Alexander (96-95) giving it to Jonas.

=== WBO Welterweight Champion ===
==== Mayer vs. Ryan ====
Mayer was scheduled to challenge WBO welterweight champion Sandy Ryan in New York on September 27, 2024. She won the fight by majority decision. On the day of the fight, while leaving to the event, Ryan was hit by a tin of paint at her hotel. Two days after the fight, Ryan demanded an immediate rematch in light of the paint incident and alleged threats against her and her support team.

==== Mayer vs. Ryan 2 ====
Mayer made the first defense of her WBO welterweight title in a rematch against Sandy Ryan at Fontainebleau in Las Vegas on 29 March 2025. She won by unanimous decision.

=== Unified Super-welterweight Championship ===
==== Mayer vs. Spencer ====
Mayer challenged WBA female super-welterweight champion Mary Spencer on October 30, 2025, at Casino de Montreal in Montreal, Canada. The vacant WBC and WBO female super-welterweight titles were also on the line. Mayer won by unanimous decision.

In March 2026, it was announced that Mayer signed with Most Valuable Promotions.

==== Mayer vs. Cameron ====
Holding the unified WBA and WBC female super-welterweight titles, Mayer faced WBO female super-welterweight champion Chantelle Cameron in a championship unification bout at bp pulse LIVE in Birmingham, England, on August 29, 2026. She lost by unanimous decision.

== Professional boxing record ==
25 fights	22 wins	3 losses
By knockout	5	0
By decision	17	3

No.	Result	Record	Opponent	Type	Round, time	Date	Location	Notes
25	Loss	22–3	Chantelle Cameron	UD	10	Aug 29, 2026	bp pulse LIVE, Birmingham, England	Lost WBC and WBA female super welterweight titles; For WBO female super welterweight title
24	Win	22–2	Mary Spencer	UD	10	Oct 30, 2025	Montreal Casino, Montreal, Canada	Won WBA, vacant WBC, and WBO female super welterweight title
23	Win	21–2	Sandy Ryan	UD	10	Mar 29, 2025	Fontainebleau, Las Vegas, Nevada, U.S.	Retained WBO female welterweight title
22	Win	20–2	Sandy Ryan	MD	10	Sep 27, 2024	The Theater at Madison Square Garden, New York City, New York, U.S.	Won WBO female welterweight title
21	Loss	19–2	Natasha Jonas	SD	10	Jan 20, 2024	Liverpool Arena, Liverpool, England	For IBF female welterweight title
20	Win	19–1	Silvia Bortot	UD	10	Sep 2, 2023	Manchester Arena, Manchester, England	
19	Win	18–1	Lucy Wildheart	UD	10	Apr 15, 2023	Copper Box Arena, London, England	Won vacant WBC interim female lightweight title
18	Loss	17–1	Alycia Baumgardner	SD	10	Oct 15, 2022	The O2 Arena, London, England	Lost WBO, IBF, and The Ring female super featherweight titles; For WBC female super featherweight title
17	Win	17–0	Jennifer Han	UD	10	Apr 9, 2022	OC Fair & Event Center, Costa Mesa, California, U.S.	Retained WBO, IBF, The Ring female super featherweight titles
16	Win	16–0	Maïva Hamadouche	UD	10	Nov 5, 2021	Virgin Hotels Las Vegas, Paradise, Nevada, U.S.	Retained WBO female super featherweight title; Won IBF and inaugural The Ring female super featherweight titles
15	Win	15–0	Érica Farías	UD	10	Jun 19, 2021	Virgin Hotels Las Vegas, Paradise, Nevada, U.S.	Retained WBO female super featherweight title
14	Win	14–0	Ewa Brodnicka	UD	10	Oct 31, 2020	MGM Grand Conference Center, Paradise, Nevada, U.S.	Won vacant WBO female super featherweight title
13	Win	13–0	Helen Joseph	UD	10	Jul 14, 2020	MGM Grand Conference Center, Paradise, Nevada, U.S.	
12	Win	12–0	Alejandra Soledad Zamora	RTD	6 (10), 2:00	Oct 26, 2019	Reno-Sparks Convention Center, Reno, Nevada, U.S.	Retained WBC-NABF female super featherweight title
11	Win	11–0	Lizbeth Crespo	UD	10	Jun 15, 2019	MGM Grand Garden Arena, Paradise, Nevada, U.S.	
10	Win	10–0	Yareli Larios	UD	8	Feb 15, 2019	Grand Casino, Hinckley, Minnesota, U.S.	Retained WBC-NABF female super featherweight title
9	Win	9–0	Calista Silgado	UD	8	Dec 14, 2018	American Bank Center, Corpus Christi, Texas, U.S.	Retained WBC-NABF female super featherweight title
8	Win	8–0	Vanessa Bradford	UD	8	Oct 13, 2018	CHI Health Center, Omaha, Nebraska, U.S.	Won vacant WBC-NABF female super featherweight title
7	Win	7–0	Edina Kiss	TKO	3 (6), 2:00	Aug 25, 2018	Gila River Arena, Glendale, Arizona, U.S.	
6	Win	6–0	Sheena Flamand	UD	6	Jun 30, 2018	Chesapeake Energy Arena, Oklahoma City, Oklahoma, U.S.	
5	Win	5–0	Baby Nansen	UD	6	May 12, 2018	Madison Square Garden, New York City, New York, U.S.	
4	Win	4–0	Maria Semertzoglou	KO	1 (4), 0:35	Mar 10, 2018	StubHub Center, Carson, California, U.S.	
3	Win	3–0	Nydia Feliciano	MD	4	Dec 9, 2017	The Theater at Madison Square Garden, New York City, New York, U.S.	
2	Win	2–0	Allison Martinez	TKO	3 (4), 0:39	Sep 22, 2017	Convention Center, Tucson, Arizona, U.S.	
1	Win	1–0	Widnelly Figueroa	KO	1 (4), 1:15	Aug 5, 2017	Microsoft Theater, Los Angeles, California, U.S.	

== Personal life ==
Between 2003 and 2005, Mayer played bass in heavy metal band Lia-Fail, which also included Nita Strauss.

== See also ==
- List of female boxers
- List of boxing triple champions

== Other sources ==
- Kevin, Baxter (October 15, 2011). "Mikaela Mayer hopes to rebound at Olympic boxing trials". Los Angeles Times.
- Kohn, Jody (June 27, 2013). "Mikaela Mayer discusses Golden Gloves, her future, more". Pro Boxing Insider.

Sporting positions
Regional boxing titles
Vacant Title last held by Sarah Pucek	NABF super-featherweight champion October 13, 2018 – October 31, 2020; Won world title	Vacant Title next held by Gabriela Tellez
World boxing titles
Vacant Title last held by Ewa Brodnicka	WBO super-featherweight champion October 31, 2020 – October 15, 2022	Succeeded by Alycia Baumgardner
Preceded by Maïva Hamadouche	IBF super-featherweight champion November 5, 2021 – October 15, 2022	Succeeded by Alycia Baumgardner
Inaugural champion	The Ring super-featherweight champion November 5, 2021 – October 15, 2022	Succeeded by Alycia Baumgardner
Vacant Title last held by Érica Farías	WBC lightweight champion Interim title April 15, 2023 – December 2023; Vacated	Vacant Title next held by Maira Moneo
Preceded by Sandy Ryan	WBO welterweight champion September 27, 2024 – present	Incumbent
Preceded by Mary Spencer	WBA light-middleweight champion October 30, 2025 – August 29, 2026	Succeeded by Chantelle Cameron
Vacant Title last held by Cecilia Brækhus	WBC light-middleweight champion October 30, 2025 – August 29, 2026	Succeeded by Chantelle Cameron
Vacant Title last held by Cecilia Brækhus	WBO light-middleweight champion October 30, 2025 – January 14, 2026; Vacated	Vacant Title next held by Chantelle Cameron
