= Gemma Richardson =

English boxer (born 2001)

Gemma Paige Richardson
Personal information
- Nationality: English
- Born: Gemma Paige Richardson; 4 August 2001 (age 25) Lincoln, Lincolnshire, England
- Height: 5 ft 5 in (165 cm)
- Weight: Light-welterweight, Lightweight

Boxing career

Boxing record
- Total fights: 6
- Wins: 6
- Win by KO: 1
Medal record
Women's amateur boxing
Representing England
Youth World Championships
Gold medal – first place	2018 Budapest	Light-welterweight
Commonwealth Games
Silver medal – second place	2022 Birmingham	Lightweight
European U22 Championships
Gold medal – first place	2021 Roseto	Lightweight
European Youth Championships
Gold medal – first place	2019 Sofia	Light-welterweight
Gold medal – first place	2018 Roseto	Light-welterweight
European Junior Championships
Gold medal – first place	2017 Sofia	Light-welterweight
Silver medal – second place	2016 Ordu	Light-welterweight

Gemma Paige Richardson (born 4 August 2001) is an English professional boxer. She has held the WBO International female super-lightweight title since October 2026. As an amateur, Richardson won the light-welterweight gold medal at the 2018 AIBA Youth World Boxing Championships, four European titles across junior, youth and under-22 competition, five English national titles, and a lightweight silver medal for England at the 2022 Commonwealth Games.

Richardson's notable amateur victories included wins over future world champions Nune Asatryan and Jaismine Lamboria, future senior European champion Stefanie von Berge, and future world bronze medallist Manisha Moun.

== Early life ==
Richardson was born in Lincoln and raised in Scunthorpe. She began attending Scunthorpe Boxing Club at the age of six after watching her older brother train. Her father, Ricko Richardson, was a boxing coach and subsequently coached both children. She began training seriously at eight, competed for the first time at ten and was selected to represent England at twelve.

Richardson later described having to overcome stereotypes about girls participating in boxing. By the end of her amateur career, she had won five national titles and represented both England and Great Britain internationally.

== Amateur career ==
=== Junior and youth championships ===
Richardson won silver at the 2016 European Junior Championships in Ordu, Turkey, before winning the European junior title in Sofia, Bulgaria, the following year In the 2017 final, she defeated Germany's Stefanie von Berge, who later became the first German woman to win a senior European boxing title in 2022.

In 2018, Richardson won the European Youth Championships at light-welterweight and then represented England at the Youth World Boxing Championships in Budapest, Hungary, where she defeated China's Wang Xulu, Wales's Caitlin Beckett and Russia's Lanna Malyuganova to reach the final in which she beat India's Manisha Moun to win the world title. Moun subsequently won a bronze medal at the 2022 IBA Women's World Boxing Championships.

Richardson retained her European Youth title in Sofia in 2019. She defeated Ireland's Evelyn Igharo, Russia's Maria Bersteneva and Finland's Eveliina Taimi before defeating von Berge by a 3–2 split decision in the final. England Boxing reported that Richardson entered the tournament with a hand injury that had prevented her from making a fist two weeks earlier.

=== Under-22 and senior competition ===
Richardson moved down to lightweight and won the 2021 European Under-22 Championships in Roseto degli Abruzzi, Italy. She defeated Ireland's Ellie Mai Gartland in the quarterfinal, top seed Nune Asatryan of Russia by split decision in the semifinal, and Ukraine's Amina Abramova unanimously in the final. Asatryan later won the lightweight title at the 2025 IBA Women's World Boxing Championships.

At the 2022 Commonwealth Games in Birmingham, England, Richardson defeated Megan Reid of Scotland, Jade Burden of Australia and Jaismine Lamboria of India to reach the women's lightweight final, which she lost to Northern Ireland's Amy Broadhurst and therefore had to settle for a silver medal. Lamboria subsequently won the 2025 World Boxing Championships, becoming India's first women's world champion under World Boxing.

Richardson continued with the Great Britain programme through the Paris 2024 Olympic cycle. At the 2024 USA Boxing International Invitational in Pueblo, Colorado, United States, she defeated Austrian Felicitas Ganglbauer and American Lisa Greer before losing to China's Yang Wenlu in the final. Greer had won the 60 kg division at the 2024 U.S. Olympic Team Trials four months earlier.

After missing out on selection for the 2024 Summer Olympics, Richardson left the amateur system and signed professional terms with promoter Steve Wood and 11:11 Management. The BBC reported that she ended her amateur career with 60 wins from 67 contests.

== Professional career ==
Richardson made her professional debut at De Vere Whites in Bolton on 8 March 2025, defeating Angelika Oles over six rounds by a referee's score of 60–55.

In her second bout, Richardson faced Tereza Dvořáková at Connexin Live Arena in Hull on 28 June 2025. She recorded her first professional stoppage when the contest was halted at 1:45 of the fifth round.

After an eight-month absence, Richardson returned on 5 April 2026 on Most Valuable Promotions' first all-women's card in the United Kingdom at Olympia in London, winning a six-round points decision over Johana Rajmont. She improved to 4–0 on 13 June 2026, by winning every round of a six-round contest against Jana Duchonova at Toughsheet Community Stadium in Bolton.

Next she defeated former European female welterweight champion Kirstie Bavington with a 60–54 shutout over six-rounds at bp pulse LIVE in Birmingham on 29 August 2026.

Richardson faced Carolyn Redmond for the vacant WBO International female super-lightweight title at Vertu Motors Arena in Newcastle on 31 October 2026. She won by unanimous decision to claim the first title of her professional career.

Richardson trains between Tenacity Hartlepool and Scunthorpe Boxing Gym under John Stubbs and her father, Ricko Richardson.

== Professional boxing record ==
6 fights	6 wins	0 losses
By knockout	1	0
By decision	5	0

No.	Result	Record	Opponent	Type	Round, time	Date	Location	Notes
6	Win	6–0	Carolyn Redmond	UD	10	31 Oct 2026	Vertu Motors Arena, Newcastle, England	Won vacant WBO International female super-lightweight title
5	Win	5–0	Kirstie Bavington	PTS	6	29 Aug 2026	bp pulse LIVE, Birmingham, England	
4	Win	4–0	Jana Duchonova	PTS	6	13 Jun 2026	Toughsheet Community Stadium, Bolton, England	
3	Win	3–0	Johana Rajmont	PTS	6	5 Apr 2026	Olympia, London, England	
2	Win	2–0	Tereza Dvorakova	TKO	5 (6), 1:45	28 Jun 2025	Connexin Live Arena, Hull, England	
1	Win	1–0	Angelika Oles	PTS	6	8 Mar 2025	De Vere Whites, Bolton, England	
