= Cecilia Comunales =

Uruguayan boxer (born 1988)

Personal information
- Nickname: La Reina ("The Queen")
- Born: Cecilia Comunales Alciaturi; 4 December 1988 (age 37) Paysandú, Uruguay
- Height: 5 ft 9 in (175 cm)
- Weight: Lightweight; Light welterweight

Boxing career
- Stance: Orthodox

Boxing record
- Total fights: 15
- Wins: 14
- Win by KO: 9
- Losses: 1

Cecilia Comunales (born 4 December 1988 in Paysandú, Uruguay) is a boxer. She has a professional record of 14-1 and was the WBA women's lightweight champion of the world.

== Early life ==
At age seven she won a beauty contest during the cosmopolitan city's annual "Beer Week", and has since been known as "La Reina", i.e. "The Queen". Initially inspired by the Clint Eastwood women's boxing movie "Million Dollar Baby", Comunales began her boxing training at age 16. She compiled a 14-4-2 record as an amateur, competing mostly in Argentina. Before taking up contact sports, Comunales had practiced skating and gymnastics. She has said that her mother did not want her to get into boxing after she saw "Million Dollar Baby", so she first told her that she was training in gymnastics.

== Professional career ==
Comunales made her professional debut on January 10, 2009 and quickly won her first 6 fights before losing in early 2010. Since that sole loss she has gone on to win her last 8 fights. On this run of wins she has picked up both the UBO and WBA lightweight titles. Apart from one fight in Panama in 2012 all of her fights have taken place in either Argentina or Uruguay.

She won the WBA's female world lightweight championship in 2012 by defeating the Dominican Republic's Maribel Santana by first-round technical knockout when the Caribbean boxer had to retire due to injury on May 30, 2012 in Panama City, Panama. She was welcomed by 22,000 fans, including Paysandu's mayor, upon returning with the world championship belt. She defended the belt twice including against Brazilian contender Simone Aparecida da Silva.

== Professional boxing record ==
15 fights	14 wins	1 loss
By knockout	9	0
By decision	5	1

No.	Result	Record	Opponent	Type	Round, time	Date	Location	Notes
15	Win	14–1	Waleria Rodrigues	TKO	8 (10), 0:49	4 Jun 2016	Radisson Victoria Plaza, Montevideo, Uruguay	Won vacant WBA lightweight title
14	Win	13–1	Lina Tejada	UD	10	8 Aug 2015	Radisson Victoria Plaza, Montevideo, Uruguay	Won vacant WBC International light-welterweight title
13	Win	12–1	Alicia Susana Alegre	TKO	5 (6)	19 Dec 2014	Estadio Municipal, Canelones, Uruguay	
12	Win	11–1	Marisol Reyes	TKO	1 (10), 1:48	20 Jul 2013	Salon de Fiestas Egeo, Paysandú, Uruguay	Retained WBA lightweight title
11	Win	10–1	Simone Aparecida da Silva	UD	10	3 Nov 2012	Club La Unión, Colón, Argentina	Retained WBA & UBO lightweight titles
10	Win	9–1	Maribel Santana	TKO	1 (10)	30 Mar 2012	Roberto Durán Arena, Panama City, Panama	Won vacant WBA lightweight title
9	Win	8–1	Alicia Susana Alegre	UD	10	19 Apr 2011	Anfiteatro del Río Uruguay, Paysandú, Uruguay	Retained UBO lightweight title
8	Win	7–1	Halanna Dos Santos	KO	6 (10), 1:20	9 Jan 2011	Hotel & Casino Conrad, Punta del Este, Uruguay	Won vacant UBO lightweight title
7	Loss	6–1	Victorina Britez	UD	4	15 Feb 2010	Club Los Titanes, La Tuna, Uruguay	
6	Win	6–0	Elizabethe Bastos	KO	1 (4), 1:44	6 Nov 2009	Palacio Contador Gastón Guelfi, Montevideo, Uruguay	
5	Win	5–0	Lorena Paola De Mello	TKO	1 (4), 1:02	18 Jun 2009	Palacio Contador Gastón Guelfi, Montevideo, Uruguay	
4	Win	4–0	Roxana Raquel Peralta	UD	4	30 Apr 2009	Estadio Luna Park, Buenos Aires, Argentina	
3	Win	3–0	Roxana Raquel Peralta	UD	4	3 Apr 2009	Complejo Habitacional Paycap, Paysandú, Uruguay	
2	Win	2–0	Silvia Beatriz Lescano	TKO	1 (4), 1:33	23 Feb 2009	Club Los Titanes, La Tuna, Uruguay	
1	Win	1–0	Lorena Nancy Lopez	TKO	1 (4), 1:34	10 Jan 2009	Hotel Las Dunas, Punta del Este, Uruguay	

== See also ==
- List of Uruguayans
- List of female boxers

Sporting positions
Regional boxing titles
Vacant Title last held by Vinni Skovgaard	WBC International female light-welterweight champion 8 August 2015 – 4 June 2016; Won world title	Vacant Title next held by Cherrelle Brown
Minor world boxing titles
New title	UBO female lightweight champion 9 January 2011 – 2016; Retired	Vacant Title next held by Czarina McCoy
Major world boxing titles
Vacant Title last held by Alejandra Oliveras	WBA female lightweight champion 30 March 2012 – 2015; Stripped	Vacant Title next held by Herself
Vacant Title last held by Herself	WBA female lightweight champion 4 June 2016 – 2016; Retired	Vacant Title next held by Anahí Ester Sánchez
