= Helen Joseph (boxer) =

Nigerian boxer

Personal information
- Nickname: Iron Lady
- Nationality: Nigerian
- Born: May 1989 (age 37) Nigeria
- Height: 5 ft 5 in (165 cm)
- Weight: Super-flyweight; Bantamweight; Featherweight

Boxing career
- Reach: 65 in (165 cm)
- Stance: Orthodox

Boxing record
- Total fights: 24
- Wins: 17
- Win by KO: 10
- Losses: 5
- Draws: 2

Helen Joseph (born May 1989) is a Nigerian professional boxer who has challenged twice for the IBF female featherweight title in 2012 and 2015.

== Professional career ==
Joseph made her professional debut on 10 January 2004, scoring a first-round technical knockout (TKO) victory against Margaret Ibiam in Lagos, Nigeria.

She compiled a record of 9–0 (5 KOs) before capturing her first professional title, defeating Mable Mulenga via unanimous decision (UD) for the vacant WIBF Intercontinental bantamweight title on 21 June 2008 at the Nationalist Stadium in Lusaka, Zambia.

Joseph went 1–1–1 in her next three fights before challenging for her first world title against IBF female featherweight champion Dahiana Santana on 17 December 2012 at the Dominican Fiesta Hotel & Casino in Santo Domingo, Dominican Republic. Joseph failed in her attempt, losing via ten-round UD.

After scoring a first-round knockout (KO) victory against Marianna Gulyas on 3 May 2013, capturing the IBF Intercontinental female featherweight title, Joseph did not compete for two years. Attempts were made in 2014 to schedule a rematch with Santana for the IBF title. However, Santana decided to relinquish the title in February 2014. IBF officials assured Joseph that she would get her shot at the title. The opportunity eventually came against Jennifer Han on 19 September 2015 at the Don Haskins Center in El Paso, Texas. In a fight which saw Joseph score a knockdown in the third round—which Han claimed was a slip—Joseph went on to suffer her third professional defeat, losing by UD with the judges' scorecards reading 98–91, 98–92, and 97–92.

She bounced back from defeat with two stoppage wins—a second-round TKO against Namely Emilia in November 2016 and a second-round KO against Shannon O'Connell in July 2017—before defeating Elizabeth Anderson with a second-round stoppage via corner retirement (RTD) on 4 November 2017, capturing the WBF Intercontinental female bantamweight title.

Her next bout came against Tyrieshia Douglas for the UBF female super-flyweight title on 29 June 2018 at Martin's West in Woodlawn, Maryland. After the ten rounds were completed the bout was ruled a majority draw (MD), with one judge scoring the bout 98–92 in favour of Joseph while the other two scored it even at 95–95.

Following two UD victories—Edina Kiss on 3 August and Martina Horgasz on 29 August—Joseph faced former two-time lightweight world champion Delfine Persoon three months later in November, losing by UD. Joseph suffered her second consecutive defeat in July 2020, losing by UD against Mikaela Mayer.

== Professional boxing record ==
24 fights	17 wins	5 losses
By knockout	10	0
By decision	7	5
Draws	2	

No.	Result	Record	Opponent	Type	Round, time	Date	Location	Notes
24	Loss	17–5–2	(United States) Mikaela Mayer	UD	10	14 Jul 2020	(United States) MGM Grand Conference Center, Paradise, Nevada, US	
23	Loss	17–4–2	(Belgium) Delfine Persoon	UD	10	11 Nov 2019	Versluys Dôme, Ostend, Belgium	
22	Win	17–3–2	(Hungary) Martina Horgasz	UD	6	29 Aug 2019	(United States) Foxwoods Resort Casino, Ledyard, Connecticut, US	
21	Win	16–3–2	(Hungary) Edina Kiss	UD	6	3 Aug 2019	(United States) Barclays Center, New York City, New York, US	
20	Draw	15–3–2	(United States) Tyrieshia Douglas	MD	1 (6), 1:13	29 Jun 2018	(United States) Martin's West, Woodlawn, Maryland, US	For UBF female super-flyweight title
19	Win	15–3–1	(United States) Elizabeth Anderson	RTD	2 (10), 2:00	4 Nov 2017	(United States) Buckhead Fight Club, Atlanta, Georgia, US	Won vacant WBF Intercontinental female bantamweight title
18	Win	14–3–1	(Australia) Shannon O'Connell	KO	2 (8), 0:55	29 Jul 2017	The Famous Fortitude Gym, Brisbane, Australia	
17	Win	13–3–1	(Ghana) Namely Emilia	TKO	2 (8)	27 Nov 2016	Seconds Out Boxing Gymnasium, Accra, Ghana	
16	Loss	12–3–1	(United States) Jennifer Han	UD	10	19 Sep 2015	(United States) Don Haskins Center, El Paso, Texas, US	For vacant IBF featherweight title
15	Win	12–2–1	(Hungary) Marianna Gulyas	KO	1 (10), 0:28	3 May 2013	Ohene Djan Stadium, Accra, Ghana	Won IBF Intercontinental female featherweight title
14	Loss	11–2–1	(Dominican Republic) Dahiana Santana	UD	10	17 Dec 2012	Dominican Fiesta Hotel & Casino, Santo Domingo, Dominican Republic	For IBF female featherweight title
13	Draw	11–1–1	(South Africa) Unathi Myekeni	PTS	10	24 Mar 2012	Carnival City Casino, Brakpan, South Africa	
12	Win	11–1	(Ghana) Namely Emilia	TKO	6 (6), 2:41	23 Sep 2011	Accra, Ghana	
11	Loss	10–1	(South Africa) Unathi Myekeni	UD	10	28 Aug 2009	Orient Theatre, East London, South Africa	
10	Win	10–0	(Zambia) Mable Mulenga	UD	10	21 Jun 2008	Nationalist Stadium, Lusaka, Zambia	Won WIBF Intercontinental bantamweight title
9	Win	9–0	(Ghana) Ameley Turkson	PTS	6	28 Jul 2007	Maison du Peuple, Ouagadougou, Burkina Faso	
8	Win	8–0	(Nigeria) Kahide Kazeem	PTS	6	5 Aug 2006	Maison du Peuple, Ouagadougou, Burkina Faso	
7	Win	7–0	(Ghana) Yarkor Chavez Annan	PTS	4	3 Jun 2006	Lomé, Togo	
6	Win	6–0	(Nigeria) Mariam Joseph	KO	2 (6)	15 Oct 2005	Ibadan, Nigeria	
5	Win	5–0	(Nigeria) Busola Obi	KO	4 (6)	25 Jun 2005	Lagos, Nigeria	
4	Win	4–0	(Nigeria) Toyin Omorayi	PTS	4	29 Jan 2005	Nigeria	
3	Win	3–0	(Nigeria) Esther Haruna	KO	3 (6)	16 Jun 2004	Lagos, Nigeria	
2	Win	2–0	(Nigeria) Ndidi Okafor	KO	3 (4)	10 Mar 2004	Lagos, Nigeria	
1	Win	1–0	(Nigeria) Margaret Ibiam	TKO	1 (4)	10 Jan 2004	Lagos, Nigeria	
