= Maïva Hamadouche =

French boxer (born 1989)

Maiva Hamadouche
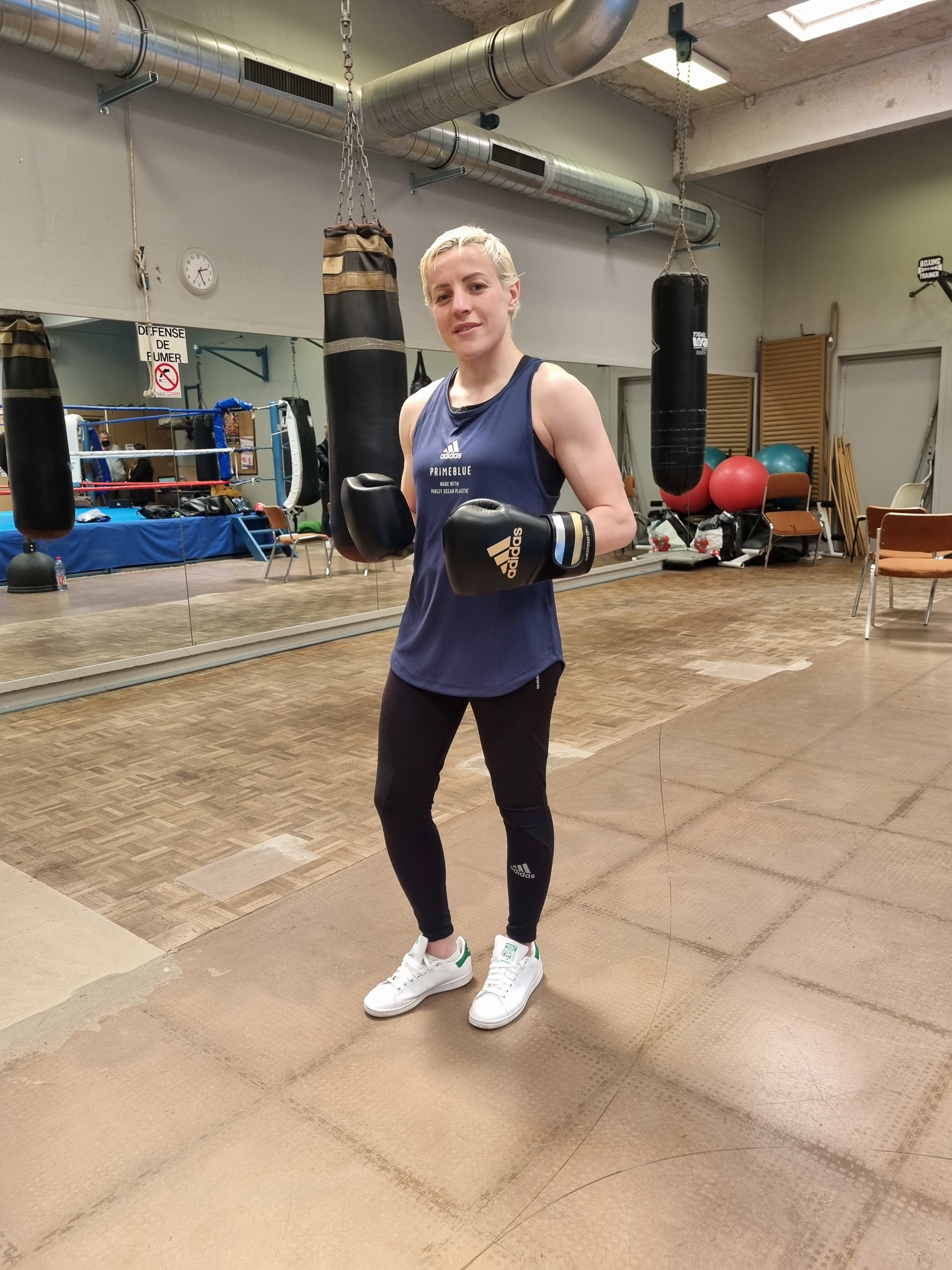
- Maïva Hamadouche, 2021

Personal information
- Nickname: El Veneno ("The Poison")
- Born: 4 November 1989 (age 36) Albi, France
- Height: 5 ft 4 in (163 cm)
- Weight: Super featherweight; Lightweight

Boxing career
- Reach: 64 in (163 cm)
- Stance: Orthodox

Boxing record
- Total fights: 24
- Wins: 22
- Win by KO: 18
- Losses: 2
Medal record
Women's amateur boxing
Representing France
European Championships
Silver medal – second place	2019 Alcobendas	Lightweight

Maïva Hamadouche (born 4 November 1989) is a French professional boxer and police officer who held the IBF female super-featherweight title from November 2016 to November 2021. At regional level, she held the French female lightweight title in 2014 and the European female lightweight title in 2015.

== Life and career ==
Hamadouche was born in Albi, in the Tarn department. She was raised by a single mother in a family of 6 children. With a baccalauréat economique et social she first planned to study law but abandoned this idea because of family and economic difficulties. Also interested in the army and more precisely in demining, she was received in the contest of the National Active Non-Commissioned Officers School of Saint-Maixent. Not wishing to leave France to continue to devote herself to boxing, she finally decided, at age 19, to make a career in the police. So, in 2009, she joined the Rouen police academy.

She worked for two years in Asnières-sur-Seine then joined in 2014 the Compagnie de sécurisation et d'intervention of Paris. In March 2018 she received the bronze honour medal for courage and devotion from the city of Paris for having rescued in June 2017 a young Mauritanian migrant, injured by a driver, by applying a tourniquet on his leg.

== Sports career ==
After practicing football, she started to train savate at the age of 14, and also practiced boxing afterwards. She became a professional in 2013. She trained in Saint-Juéry at the beginning, then in Clichy after moving to Paris, having Sot Mezaache as her coach.

She is seven-time vice-champion of France in savate and English boxing, eventually opting for the second discipline despite her debut in French boxing.

In March 2015, in Milan, she became European lightweight champion, while the title was vacant, beating Italy's Anita Torti by throw of the towel in the 5th round then she retained his title in May in Clichy, winning on points in ten rounds against the same competitor.

In November 2016, Maïva Hamadouche won her first IBF World Super featherweight title, still vacant, winning by points in 10 rounds in Paris against the American Jennifer Salinas. She became the third Frenchwoman to win that title after Myriam Lamare and Anne-Sophie Mathis. She retained the title in January 2017 against Milena Koleva, from Bulgaria, in May 2017 against Anahí Ester Sánchez, from Argentina, then in 2018 against the French Myriam Dellal. On 4 December 2018, Maïva Hamadouche kept her IBF world champion title, for the fifth time, against Brazil's Viviane Obenauf.

Taking advantage of a rule change which allowed professional boxers to compete in the Olympics, Hamadouche qualified for the delayed 2020 Tokyo Games only to lose in her opening contest to Finland's Mira Potkonen.

On 5 November 2021, she returned to professional competition to take on WBO female super-featherweight World champion Mikaela Mayer in a contest that saw both women's titles and the inaugural Ring female super-featherweight belt on the line. Mayer prevailed by unanimous decision.

Hamadouche announced her retirement from boxing in May 2023 due to an eye injury that would no longer allow her to fight.

== Professional boxing record ==
24 fights	22 wins	2 losses
By knockout	18	0
By decision	4	2

No.	Result	Record	Opponent	Type	Round, time	Date	Location	Notes
24	Loss	22–2	Mikaela Mayer	UD	10	2021-11-05	The Theater at Virgin Hotels, Paradise, Nevada, U.S.	Lost IBF super-featherweight title; For WBO super-featherweight title
23	Win	22–1	Nina Pavlovic	TKO	8 (10)	2020-12-17	Allianz Cloud Arena, Milan, Italy	Retained IBF super-featherweight title
22	Win	21–1	Janeth Pérez	TKO	6 (10)	2019-07-18	Theatre du Tivoli, Le Cannet, France	Retained IBF super-featherweight title
21	Win	20–1	Viviane Obenauf	RTD	5 (10)	2018-12-04	Le Zénith, Paris, France	Retained IBF super-featherweight title
20	Win	19–1	Gabriella Mezei	KO	1 (8)	2018-10-11	Palais des Sports, Orléans, France	
19	Win	18–1	Myriam Dellal	MD	10	2018-01-20	Palais des sports Marcel-Cerdan, Levallois-Perret, France	Retained IBF super-featherweight title
18	Win	17–1	Milena Koleva	TKO	4 (6)	2017-11-11	Vélodrome National, Montigny-le-Bretonneux, France	
17	Win	16–1	Anahí Ester Sánchez	TKO	4 (10)	2017-05-18	Cirque d'hiver, Paris, France	Retained IBF super-featherweight title
16	Win	15–1	Milena Koleva	TKO	9 (10)	2017-01-21	Palais des sports Marcel-Cerdan, Levallois-Perret, France	Retained IBF super-featherweight title
15	Win	14–1	Jennifer Salinas	UD	10	2016-11-10	Halle Georges Carpentier, Paris, France	Won vacant IBF super-featherweight title
14	Win	13–1	Enis Pacheco	TKO	2 (10)	2016-05-27	Cirque d'hiver, Paris, France	Won vacant WBC Silver lightweight title
13	Win	12–1	Maria Semertzoglou	UD	8	2016-04-28	Casino Ruhl, Nice, France	
12	Win	11–1	Angel McKenzie	TKO	1 (8)	2016-03-18	Gymnase Georges Racine, Clichy, France	
11	Win	10–1	Aouatif Al Kallachi	TKO	5 (6)	2015-12-17	Cirque d'hiver, Paris, France	
10	Loss	9–1	Delfine Persoon	UD	10	2015-11-11	Zwevezele, Belgium	For WBC lightweight title
9	Win	9–0	Suzana Radovanovic	TKO	1 (6)	2015-10-03	Gymnase Royallieu, Compiègne, France	
8	Win	8–0	Anita Torti	UD	10	2015-05-22	Gymnase Georges Racine, Clichy, France	Retained European lightweight title
7	Win	7–0	Anita Torti	TKO	5 (10)	2015-03-21	Teatro Principe, Milan, Italy	Won vacant European lightweight title
6	Win	6–0	Galina Gyumliyska	TKO	4 (6)	2015-02-21	Sala Polivalenta, Cluj-Napoca, Romania	
5	Win	5–0	Johanne Cavarec	TKO	3 (6)	2014-11-15	Salle Louison Bobet, Aix-en-Provence, France	
4	Win	4–0	Wendy Gervois	TKO	4 (8)	2014-05-16	Gymnase Georges Racine, Clichy, France	Won vacant French lightweight title
3	Win	3–0	Floarea Lihet	RTD	3 (6)	2014-03-14	Salle Jean Blot, Courbevoie, Courbevoie, France	
2	Win	2–0	Mirabela Nadina Calugareanu	TKO	2 (6)	2014-01-25	Horia Demian Sports Hall, Cluj-Napoca, Romania	
1	Win	1–0	Karina Szmalenberg	TKO	2 (6)	2013-12-07	Gymnase Georges Racine, Clichy, France	

== See also ==
- List of female boxers

Sporting positions
Regional boxing titles
Vacant Title last held by Prisca Vicot	French lightweight champion 16 May 2014 – 2015; Vacated	Vacant Title next held by Johanne Cavarec
Vacant Title last held by Nicole Boss	European lightweight champion 21 March 2015 – 2015; Vacated	Vacant Title next held by Ewa Brodnicka
New title	WBC Silver lightweight champion 27 May 2016 – 10 November 2016; Won world title	Vacant Title next held by Chantelle Cameron
World boxing titles
Vacant Title last held by Anahí Ester Sánchez	IBF super-featherweight champion 10 November 2016 – 5 November 2021	Succeeded by Mikaela Mayer
