= Jennifer Han =

American boxer (born 1983)

Personal information
- Born: June 25, 1983 (age 43) El Paso, Texas, U.S.
- Height: 5 ft 6 in (168 cm)
- Weight: Featherweight; Super featherweight; Lightweight

Boxing career
- Reach: 66 in (168 cm)
- Stance: Orthodox

Boxing record
- Total fights: 26
- Wins: 18
- Win by KO: 1
- Losses: 5
- Draws: 1
- No contests: 3

Jennifer Han (born June 25, 1983) is an American professional boxer who held the IBF female featherweight title from 2015 to 2020, and was the first world champion boxer from El Paso, Texas. She is a member of the International Women's Boxing Hall of Fame.

== Professional career ==
Han made her professional debut on July 31, 2009, losing via majority decision (MD) over four rounds against Melissa St. Vil at the Pan American Center in Las Cruces, New Mexico.

After compiling a record of 10–2–1 (1 KO), she challenged reigning champion Ji-Hye Woo for the International Female Boxers Association featherweight title on March 23, 2014, at the Wooseul Gymnasium in Haenam, South Korea. Han suffered the third defeat of her career, losing via ten-round MD. Two judges scored the bout 97–95 and 96–93 in favor of Woo while the third judge scored it a draw at 95–95.

Two fights later, she was scheduled to face Helen Joseph on April 18, 2015, with the vacant IBF female featherweight title on the line. However, Joseph was forced to withdraw from the bout after she was unable to obtain a VISA to enter the U.S.. Fatuma Zarika stepped in as a late replacement, with Han emerging victorious via unanimous decision (UD) to capture the vacant IBF female Intercontinental featherweight title. The fight with Joseph for the vacant IBF world title was rescheduled for September 19, and took place at the Don Haskins Center in El Paso, Texas. Han captured her first world title via UD with the judges' scorecards reading 98–91, 98–92 and 97–92. With the victory, Han became the first world champion boxer from El Paso.

After two successful defences of her world title, Han faced Olivia Gerula on February 17, 2017, at the Don Haskins Center. At the pre-fight weigh-in, Gerula weighed 1.5 lbs over the maximum weight limit, making her ineligible to contest for the IBF championship. With the title still on the line for Han, she made a successful defence, winning via UD with all three judges scoring the bout 100–89.

She made one more defence–a UD victory against Lizbeth Crespo in February 2018–before taking two years away from the sport after giving birth to a child in May 2019. Han returned to the ring on February 15, 2020, scoring an eight-round UD victory against Jeri Sitzes in a non-title bout.

Han relinquished her title in July 2020, and moved up to the lightweight division. On September 4, 2021, at Headingley Rugby Stadium in Leeds, England, she challenged reigning champion Katie Taylor for the undisputed female lightweight championship losing the contest by unanimous decision.

Switching weight divisions again, Han's next fight was a unanimous decision loss to IBF and WBO female super-featherweight world champion Mikaela Mayer at the Orange County Fair & Event Center in Costa Mesa, California, on 9 April 2022.

She was inducted into the International Women's Boxing Hall of Fame in 2025.

== Personal life ==
Han's sister Stephanie is also a professional boxer.

== Professional boxing record ==
27 fights	18 wins	5 losses
By knockout	1	0
By decision	17	5
Draws	1	
No contests	3	

No.	Result	Record	Opponent	Type	Round, time	Date	Location	Notes
27	Loss	18–5–1 (3)	(United States) Mikaela Mayer	UD	10	Apr 9, 2022	(United States) OC Fair & Event Center, Costa Mesa, California, U.S.	For WBO, IBF, The Ring female super featherweight titles
26	Loss	18–4–1 (3)	(Republic of Ireland) Katie Taylor	UD	10	Sep 4, 2021	(United Kingdom) Emerald Headingley Stadium, Leeds, England	For WBA, WBC, IBF, WBO, and The Ring female lightweight titles
25	Win	18–3–1 (3)	(United States) Jeri Sitzes	UD	8	Feb 15, 2020	(United States) El Paso County Coliseum, El Paso, Texas, U.S.	
24	Win	17–3–1 (3)	(Bolivia) Lizbeth Crespo	UD	10	Feb 17, 2018	(United States) Don Haskins Center, El Paso, Texas, U.S.	Retained IBF female featherweight title
23	Win	16–3–1 (3)	(Canada) Olivia Gerula	UD	10	Feb 17, 2017	(United States) Don Haskins Center, El Paso, Texas, U.S.	IBF female featherweight title at stake for Han only after Gerula missed weight
22	Win	15–3–1 (3)	(Dominican Republic) Liliana Martinez	UD	10	Oct 15, 2016	(United States) Don Haskins Center, El Paso, Texas, U.S.	Retained IBF female featherweight title
21	Win	14–3–1 (3)	(Colombia) Calista Silgado	UD	10	Apr 29, 2016	(United States) Southwest University Event Center, El Paso, Texas, U.S.	Retained IBF female featherweight title
20	Win	13–3–1 (3)	(Nigeria) Helen Joseph	UD	10	Sep 19, 2015	(United States) Don Haskins Center, El Paso, Texas, U.S.	Won vacant IBF female featherweight title
19	Win	12–3–1 (3)	(Kenya) Fatuma Zarika	UD	10	Apr 18, 2015	(United States) El Paso County Coliseum, El Paso, Texas, U.S.	Won vacant IBF female Intercontinental featherweight title
18	Win	11–3–1 (3)	(United States) Christina Ruiz	UD	8	Jun 28, 2014	(United States) El Paso County Coliseum, El Paso, Texas, U.S.	
17	Loss	10–3–1 (3)	(South Korea) Ji-Hye Woo	MD	10	Mar 23, 2014	Wooseul Gymnasium, Haenam, South Korea	For IFBA featherweight title
16	Win	10–2–1 (3)	(Mexico) Lesly Morales	UD	6	Oct 5, 2013	(United States) Socorro Entertainment Center, Socorro, Texas, U.S.	
15	Win	9–2–1 (3)	(United States) Karen Dulin	UD	8	Jun 22, 2013	(United States) PT's Showclub, Denver, Colorado, U.S.	
14	Loss	8–2–1 (3)	(United States) Claudia Gutierrez	SD	4	Oct 27, 2012	(United States) El Paso County Coliseum, El Paso, Texas, U.S.	
13	Win	8–1–1 (3)	(United States) Kita Watkins	UD	4	Aug 24, 2012	(United States) Renaissance Worthington Hotel, Fort Worth, Texas, U.S.	
12	Win	7–1–1 (3)	(United States) Nohime Dennisson	UD	6	Dec 3, 2011	(United States) Pan American Center, Las Cruces, New Mexico, U.S.	
11	Win	6–1–1 (3)	(United States) Tammy Franks	UD	4	Nov 11, 2011	(United States) Cohen Coliseum, El Paso, Texas, U.S.	
10	Win	5–1–1 (3)	(United States) Davrene Morrison	RTD	4 (6), 3:00	Oct 15, 2011	(United States) Cohen Stadium, El Paso, Texas, U.S.	
9	Win	4–1–1 (3)	(United States) Kerri Hill	UD	4	Sep 15, 2011	(United States) El Paso County Coliseum, El Paso, Texas, U.S.	
8	Win	3–1–1 (3)	(United States) Lisa Lozano	UD	4	Aug 19, 2011	(United States) Renaissance Worthington Hotel, Fort Worth, Texas, U.S.	
7	NC	2–1–1 (3)	(Mexico) Jessica Gonzalez	NC	6	Apr 9, 2011	Poliforum Mezoamericano, Tuxtla Gutiérrez, Mexico	
6	NC	2–1–1 (2)	(Mexico) Jessica Gonzalez	NC	6	Apr 2, 2011	Poliforum Mezoamericano, Tuxtla Gutiérrez, Mexico	
5	NC	2–1–1 (1)	(Mexico) Andrea Cortina	NC	6	Mar 26, 2011	Poliforum Mezoamericano, Tuxtla Gutiérrez, Mexico	
4	Win	2–1–1	(United States) Geni Taylor	UD	4	Feb 11, 2011	(United States) Don Haskins Center, El Paso, Texas, U.S.	
3	Win	1–1–1	(United States) Crystal Hoy	UD	4	Apr 10, 2010	(United States) Thomas & Mack Center, Paradise, Nevada, U.S.	
2	Draw	0–1–1	(United States) Nydia Feliciano	SD	6	Mar 12, 2010	(United States) PAL Gym, Yonkers, New York, U.S.	
1	Loss	0–1	(United States) Melissa St. Vil	MD	4	Jul 31, 2009	(United States) Pan American Center, Las Cruces, New Mexico, U.S.	

Regional boxing titles
N/A	IBF female Intercontinental featherweight champion April 18, 2015 – September 19, 2015; Won world title	N/A
World boxing titles
Vacant Title last held by Dahiana Santana	IBF female featherweight champion September 19, 2015 – July 2020; Vacated	Vacant Title next held by Sarah Mahfoud; Interim champion promoted
