= Anahí Ester Sánchez =

Argentine boxer (born 1991)

Personal information
- Nickname: La Indiecita
- Born: 21 July 1991 (age 34) Pergamino, Argentina
- Weight: Featherweight; Super-featherweight; Lightweight; Light-welterweight

Boxing career
- Stance: Orthodox

Boxing record
- Total fights: 30
- Wins: 24
- Win by KO: 13
- Losses: 6

Anahí Ester Sánchez (born 21 July 1991) is an Argentine professional boxer. She is a three-weight world champion, having held the IBF female super-featherweight title in 2016; the WBA female lightweight title in 2017; and the WBA female super lightweight title in 2019. She also held the WBA interim female featherweight title in 2015 and the WBA interim female super-lightweight title from 2018 to 2019, and challenged for the WBC and IBF female super-featherweight, and WBC female super-lightweight titles between 2016 and 2019.

== Professional career ==
Sánchez made her professional debut on 15 November 2013, scoring a first-round technical knockout (TKO) victory against Lorena Noemi Gomez at the Gimnasio Municipal in Pergamino, Argentina.

After compiling a record of 6–0 (2 KOs) she faced Maria Soledad Capriolo for the vacant South American super featherweight title on 15 May 2015, at the Gimnasio Municipal. Sánchez defeated Capriolo via first-round knockout (KO) to capture her first professional title.

=== Featherweight ===
After three more wins, one by stoppage, she faced former IBF female featherweight and reigning WBA interim female featherweight champion Dahiana Santana on 14 August 2015 at the Club Comunaciones in Pergamino. Sánchez captured her first title from a major sanctioning body, albeit an interim version, after defeating Santana by a wide unanimous decision (UD) over ten rounds. One judge scored the bout 99–91 while the other two scored it 97–93.

=== Super featherweight ===
She successfully defended her interim title with a third-round TKO against Ana Maria Lozano in November, before facing Areti Mastrodouka for the vacant IBF female super featherweight title on 19 March 2016 at the Club Comunicaciones. Sánchez captured her first full world title, scoring a fifth-round stoppage victory via corner retirement (RTD) after Mastrodouka informed her corner that she no longer wished to continue at the end of the round.

After defending her IBF title with a majority decision (MD) victory against Tamara Marianela Nuñez in July, Sánchez was stripped of the title after it was revealed the promoter of the fight failed to obtain the necessary licences.

In her next fight she challenged WBC female super featherweight champion Eva Wahlström on 17 December 2016 at the Hartwall Arena in Helsinki, Finland. Sánchez suffered the first defeat of her professional career, losing by UD with judges' scorecards reading 98–92 and 97–94 twice.

She bounced back from defeat with a first-round TKO victory against Verena Crespo in March 2017, before attempting to regain the IBF title, she was stripped of, facing reigning champion Maïva Hamadouche on 18 May at the Cirque d'hiver in Paris, France. Sánchez failed in her attempt, losing by fourth-round TKO.

=== Lightweight ===
Following her second professional defeat she moved up a division to lightweight, defeating Maria Carina Brito via first-round knockout (KO). Sánchez' second fight at her new weight came against Cecilia Sofia Mena for the vacant WBA female lightweight title on 9 September 2017 at the Club Defensores de Villa Lujan in San Miguel de Tucumán, Argentina. Sánchez defeated Mena via sixth-round TKO, capturing the WBA title to become a two-weight world champion.

Two days after capturing the WBA title, British promoter Eddie Hearn announced that a deal had been made for Sánchez to face 2012 Olympic gold medalist Katie Taylor on 28 October 2017 at the Principality Stadium in Cardiff, Wales, live on Sky Sports Box Office as part of the undercard for Anthony Joshua vs. Kubrat Pulev (Pulev was later replaced by Carlos Takam). Before the fight, Sánchez was stripped of her title for failing to weigh in under the lightweight limit, meaning the WBA title would only be on the line of Taylor. In a fight which saw Sánchez dropped to the canvas from a left hand to the ribs in the second round, she went on to suffer her third professional defeat, losing by a wide UD with all three judges scoring the bout 99–90.

=== Super lightweight ===
Following the defeat to Taylor, Sánchez once again moved up in weight to the super lightweight division. Her first fight at the weight was a fifth-round KO victory against Ruth Stephanie Aquino in February 2018. Sánchez next fought former world title challenger Diana Ayala for the vacant WBA interim female super lightweight title on 20 April at the Club Comunicaciones. Sánchez defeated Ayala via first-round KO to capture a title in a third division.

After being elevated from interim to full WBA female super lightweight champion, Sánchez faced WBC champion Jessica McCaskill in a unification bout on 25 May 2019 at the MGM National Harbor in Oxon Hill, Maryland. After having success in the first half of the fight, Sánchez went on to lose by a wide UD, with the judges' scorecards reading 98–91, 98–92, and 96–94.

Her next fight was a WBC final eliminator—with the winner securing a shot at former conqueror Jessica McCaskill—against former IBO female lightweight champion Chantelle Cameron on 9 November 2019 at the York Hall in London, England. Sánchez suffered a knockdown in the ninth round en route to a wide UD defeat, with two judges scoring the bout 100–89 and the third scoring it 99–90.

== Professional boxing record ==
30 fights	24 wins	6 losses
By knockout	13	1
By decision	11	5

No.	Result	Record	Opponent	Type	Round, time	Date	Location	Notes
30	Win	23–6	(Argentina) Estefania Karen Alaniz	UD	10	19 Apr 2024	Estadio F.A.B., Buenos Aires, Argentina	Won South American super-lightweight title
29	Win	24–6	(Argentina) Marisa Joana Portillo	UD	10	11 Nov 2023	Club Deportivo y Social Sportsmen Unidos, Rosario, Argentina	
28	Win	22–6	(Argentina) Yamila Reynoso	UD	10	15 July 2023	Club Atletico Paracao, Parana, Argentina	
27	Loss	21–6	(United Kingdom) Sandy Ryan	UD	10	26 Nov 2022	(United Kingdom) The SSE Arena, London, England	For WBC International super lightweight title
26	Win	21–5	(Argentina) Natalia Alejandra Zulema Juarez	TKO	2 (6), 1:20	9 Sep 2022	Club Compania, Pergamino, Argentina	
25	Win	20–5	(Argentina) Maria Soledad Capriolo	TKO	3 (6), 2:55	18 Dec 2020	Club Atlético Sports, Pergamino, Argentina	
24	Loss	19–5	(United Kingdom) Chantelle Cameron	UD	10	9 Nov 2019	(United Kingdom) York Hall, London, England	
23	Loss	19–4	(United States) Jessica McCaskill	UD	10	25 May 2019	(United States) MGM National Harbor, Oxon Hill, Maryland, US	Lost WBA female super lightweight title; For WBC female super lightweight title
22	Win	19–3	(Colombia) Diana Ayala	KO	1 (10)	20 Apr 2018	Club Comunicaciones, Pergamino, Argentina	Won vacant WBA interim female super lightweight title
21	Win	18–3	(Argentina) Ruth Stephanie Aquino	KO	5 (6)	9 Feb 2018	Olimpia BBC, Venado Tuerto, Argentina	
20	Loss	17–3	(Republic of Ireland) Katie Taylor	UD	10	28 Oct 2017	(United Kingdom) Principality Stadium, Cardiff, Wales	
19	Win	17–2	(Argentina) Cecilia Sofia Mena	TKO	6 (10)	9 Sep 2017	Club Defensores de Villa Lujan, San Miguel de Tucumán, Argentina	Won vacant WBA female lightweight title
18	Win	16–2	(Argentina) Maria Carina Brito	KO	1 (6)	14 Jul 2017	Club Comunicaciones, Pergamino, Argentina	
17	Loss	15–2	(France) Maïva Hamadouche	TKO	4 (10)	18 May 2017	Cirque d'hiver, Paris, France	For IBF female super featherweight title
16	Win	15–1	(Argentina) Verena Crespo	TKO	1 (6)	3 Mar 2017	Club Comunicaciones, Pergamino, Argentina	
15	Loss	14–1	(Finland) Eva Wahlström	UD	10	17 Dec 2016	Hartwall Arena, Helsinki, Finland	For WBC female super featherweight title
14	Win	14–0	(Colombia) Tamara Marianela Nuñez	MD	10	15 Jul 2016	Club Comunicaciones, Pergamino, Argentina	Retained IBF female super featherweight title
13	Win	13–0	(Greece) Areti Mastrosdouka	RTD	5 (10), 2:00	19 Mar 2016	Club Comunicaciones, Pergamino, Argentina	Won vacant IBF female super featherweight title
12	Win	12–0	(Venezuela) Ana Maria Lozano	TKO	3 (10), 1:59	14 Nov 2015	Gimnasio Municipal, Pergamino, Argentina	Retained WBA interim female featherweight title
11	Win	11–0	(Dominican Republic) Dahiana Santana	UD	10	14 Aug 2015	Club Comunicaciones, Pergamino, Argentina	Won WBA interim female featherweight title
10	Win	10–0	(Argentina) Johana Estefania Sanchez	TKO	1 (4)	17 Jul 2015	Club Argentino Rancagua, Rancagua, Argentina	
9	Win	9–0	(Argentina) Tamara Marianela Nuñez	SD	4	4 Jul 2015	Club Atlético Béccar, Béccar, Argentina	
8	Win	8–0	(Argentina) Natalia Vanesa del Valle Aguirre	UD	6	12 Jun 2015	Gimnasio Municipal, Pergamino, Argentina	
7	Win	7–0	(Argentina) Maria Soledad Capriolo	KO	1 (10)	15 May 2015	Gimnasio Municipal, Pergamino, Argentina	Won vacant South American female super featherweight title
6	Win	6–0	(Argentina) Silvia Fernanda Zacarias	UD	4	20 Feb 2015	Gimnasio Municipal, Pergamino, Argentina	
5	Win	5–0	(Argentina) Betina Gabriel Garino	UD	6	14 Nov 2014	Gimnasio Municipal, Pergamino, Argentina	
4	Win	4–0	(Argentina) Gloria Elena Yancaqueo	UD	4	22 Aug 2014	Club Juan Anchorena, Urquiza, Argentina	
3	Win	3–0	(United States) Johana Estefania Sanchez	UD	4	25 Jul 2014	Club Argentino de Rancagua, Rancagua, Argentina	
2	Win	2–0	(Argentina) Romina Lopez	KO	1 (4)	6 Jun 2014	Buenos Aires, Argentina	
1	Win	1–0	(Argentina) Lorena Noemi Gomez	TKO	1 (4)	15 Nov 2013	Gimnasio Municipal, Pergamino, Argentina	

Sporting positions
Regional boxing titles
Inaugural champion	South American female super featherweight champion 15 May 2015 – July 2015	Vacant Title next held by Lizbeth Crespo
World boxing titles
Vacant Title last held by Dahiana Santana	WBA female featherweight champion Interim title 14 August 2015 – February 2016	Vacant Title next held by Marcela Acuña
Vacant Title last held by Betiana Patricia Vinas	IBF female super featherweight champion 19 March 2016 – October 2016	Vacant Title next held by Maïva Hamadouche
Vacant Title last held by Cecilia Comunales	WBA female lightweight champion 9 September 2017 – 28 October 2017	Succeeded by Katie Taylor
Vacant Title last held by Svetlana Kulakova	WBA female super lightweight champion Interim title 20 April 2018 – January 2019; Promoted to full champion	Vacant
Vacant Title last held by Ana Esteche	WBA female super lightweight champion January 2019 – 25 May 2019	Succeeded by Jessica McCaskill
