= Jessica McCaskill =

American boxer (born 1984)

Personal information
- Nickname: CasKilla
- Born: September 8, 1984 (age 42) St. Louis, Missouri, U.S.
- Height: 5 ft 6 in (168 cm)
- Weight: Lightweight; Super-lightweight; Welterweight

Boxing career
- Reach: 69 in (175 cm)
- Stance: Orthodox

Boxing record
- Total fights: 17
- Wins: 12
- Win by KO: 5
- Losses: 4
- Draws: 1

Jessica McCaskill (born September 8, 1984) is an American former professional boxer. She is a former world champion in two weight classes, having held the undisputed, IBO and Ring female welterweight titles; the WBC female super-lightweight title and the WBA female super-lightweight title. She also challenged for the WBA lightweight title.

== Early life ==
Native to Belleville, Illinois (part of Greater St. Louis), McCaskill and was raised by her great-aunt and her four sons. As a child her family fell on hard times and lived in the back of a local church. In 2008 McCaskill started her amateur boxing career. In 2012 McCaskill moved to Chicago and started working as an investment banker.

== Amateur career ==
McCaskill started boxing in 2008, just for fitness, and had her first amateur bout in April 2009. After climbing the ranks, she won the 2010 Golden Gloves award. With a 17–1 amateur record, McCaskill won the Golden Glove Championship belts in 2014 and 2015.

== Professional career ==
McCaskill made her professional debut on August 22, 2015 with a technical knockout (TKO) victory against Tyrea Nichole Duncan at the Horseshoe Casino in Hammond, Indiana. In November 2016, McCaskill was signed by Warriors Boxing.

After fighting local boxers, McCaskill challenged Irish Olympic gold-medal boxer Katie Taylor for the WBA female lightweight title. She was defeated by Taylor via unanimous decision (98–91, 97–92, 97–92), in a fight held at the York Hall in London on December 13, 2017.

On October 6, 2018, McCaskill defeated two-weight world champion Érica Farías for the WBC female super lightweight title at the Wintrust Arena in Chicago, Illinois, winning her first world title by unanimous decision, with the judges' scorecards reading 98–92, 97–93 and 96–94.

McCaskill retained her WBC title and won the WBA female super lightweight title against Anahí Ester Sánchez via unanimous decision (99–91, 98–92, 96–94) in a bout held at the MGM National Harbor in Oxon Hill, Maryland on May 25, 2019.

On October 12, 2019, McCaskill defended her unified titles in a rematch against Érica Farías at the Wintrust Arena in Chicago. She retained her titles with a Majority decision win, with two judges scoring the bout 97–91 and 96–92 in favour of McCaskill, and the third scoring it a draw at 94–94.

On August 15, 2020, McCaskill became the first person to defeat Cecilia Braekhus. The match was for the IBF, IBO, WBA, WBC, and WBO world titles at welterweight. In 2021, she defeated Braekhus again in a rematch, retaining her status as the undisputed champion at welterweight.

In 2022, she lost to Chantelle Cameron in a match held in Abu Dhabi.

McCaskill is trained by Rick Ramos and managed by Warriors Boxing.

=== 2024 ===
Early 2024 it was announced that McCaskill would defend her WBC, WBA, IBO and Ring welterweight titles against Ivana Habazin on April 20, 2024 in Croatia. The fight did not go ahead, as on March 14, 2024 it was announced that McCaskill - who had vacated the WBC title - would defend her WBA, IBO and Ring Magazine welterweight titles against Lauren Price on May 11, 2024 in Cardiff, Wales. Price won the contest by unanimous technical decision after an accidental clash of heads that took place in the fifth round caused an injury to McCaskill's eye and she was ruled unable to continue at the start of round nine.

In July 2024, McCaskill announced her retirement from professional boxing.

== Professional boxing record ==
17 fights	12 wins	4 losses
By knockout	5	0
By decision	7	4
Draws	1	

No.	Result	Record	Opponent	Type	Round, time	Date	Location	Notes
17	Loss	12–4–1	Lauren Price	TD	9 (10)	11 May 2024	Cardiff International Arena, Cardiff, Wales, U.K	Lost WBA, Ring and IBO female welterweight titles
16	Draw	12–3–1	Sandy Ryan	SD	10	23 Sep 2023	Caribe Royale Orlando, Orlando, Florida, U.S.	Retained WBA, WBC and IBO female welterweight titles; For WBO female welterweight title
15	Loss	12–3	Chantelle Cameron	UD	10	Nov 5, 2022	Etihad Arena, Abu Dhabi, United Arab Emirates	For WBC, IBF, The Ring, vacant WBA, WBO, and IBO female light welterweight titles
14	Win	12–2	Alma Ibarra	RTD	3 (10), 2:00	Jun 25, 2022	Tech Port Arena, San Antonio, Texas, U.S.	Retained WBA, WBC, IBF, WBO, IBO, and The Ring female welterweight titles
13	Win	11–2	Kandi Wyatt	TKO	7 (10), 0:19	Dec 4, 2021	MGM Grand Garden Arena, Paradise, Nevada, U.S.	Retained WBA, WBC, IBF, WBO, IBO, and The Ring female welterweight titles
12	Win	10–2	Cecilia Brækhus	UD	10	Mar 13, 2021	American Airlines Center, Dallas, Texas, U.S.	Retained WBA, WBC, IBF, WBO, and IBO female welterweight titles; Won inaugural The Ring female welterweight title
11	Win	9–2	Cecilia Brækhus	MD	10	Aug 15, 2020	Downtown Streets, Tulsa, Oklahoma, U.S.	Won WBA, WBC, IBF, WBO, and IBO female welterweight titles
10	Win	8–2	Érica Farías	MD	10	Oct 12, 2019	Wintrust Arena, Chicago, Illinois, U.S.	Retained WBA and WBC light welterweight titles
9	Win	7–2	Anahí Ester Sánchez	UD	10	May 25, 2019	MGM National Harbor, Oxon Hill, Maryland, U.S.	Retained WBC female light welterweight title; Won WBA female light welterweight title
8	Win	6–2	Érica Farías	UD	10	Oct 6, 2018	Wintrust Arena, Chicago, Illinois, U.S.	Won WBC female light welterweight title
7	Loss	5–2	Katie Taylor	UD	10	Dec 13, 2017	York Hall, London, England	For WBA female lightweight title
6	Win	5–1	Natalie Brown	TKO	2 (8), 2:59	Jul 29, 2017	UIC Pavilion, Chicago, Illinois, U.S.	
5	Win	4–1	Brenda Gonzales	UD	6	Apr 28, 2017	UIC Pavilion, Chicago, Illinois, U.S.	
4	Win	3–1	Carla Torres	UD	4	Jan 21, 2017	UIC Pavilion, Chicago, Illinois, U.S.	
3	Win	2–1	Alexandria Williams	TKO	3 (4), 0:45	Oct 1, 2016	UIC Pavilion, Chicago, Illinois, U.S.	
2	Loss	1–1	Katonya Fisher	SD	4	Jun 18, 2016	UIC Pavilion, Chicago, Illinois, U.S.	
1	Win	1–0	Tyrea Nichole Duncan	TKO	2 (4), 2:37	Aug 22, 2015	Horseshoe Casino, Hammond, Indiana, U.S.	

== See also ==
- List of female boxers

Sporting positions
Minor world boxing titles
Preceded by Cecilia Brækhus	IBO female welterweight champion August 15, 2020 – May 11, 2024	Succeeded by Lauren Price
Major world boxing titles
Preceded by Érica Farías	WBC female super lightweight champion October 6, 2018 – present	Vacant Title next held by Chantelle Cameron
Preceded by Anahí Ester Sánchez	WBA female super lightweight champion May 25, 2019 – August 2020; Vacated	Vacant Title next held by Kali Reis
Preceded by Cecilia Brækhus	WBA female welterweight champion August 15, 2020 – May 11, 2024	Succeeded by Lauren Price
Preceded by Cecilia Brækhus	WBC female welterweight champion August 15, 2020 – April 20, 2024	Vacant Title next held by Ivana Habazin
Preceded by Cecilia Brækhus	IBF female welterweight champion August 15, 2020 – November 5, 2022; Stripped	Vacant Title next held by Natasha Jonas
Preceded by Cecilia Brækhus	WBO female welterweight champion August 15, 2020 – November 5, 2022; Stripped	Vacant Title next held by Sandy Ryan
Preceded by Cecilia Brækhus	Undisputed female welterweight champion August 15, 2020 – November 5, 2022; Titles fragmented	Vacant
Inaugural champion	The Ring female welterweight champion March 13, 2021 – May 11, 2024	Succeeded by Lauren Price
