= Ewa Brodnicka =

Polish boxer and mixed martial artist

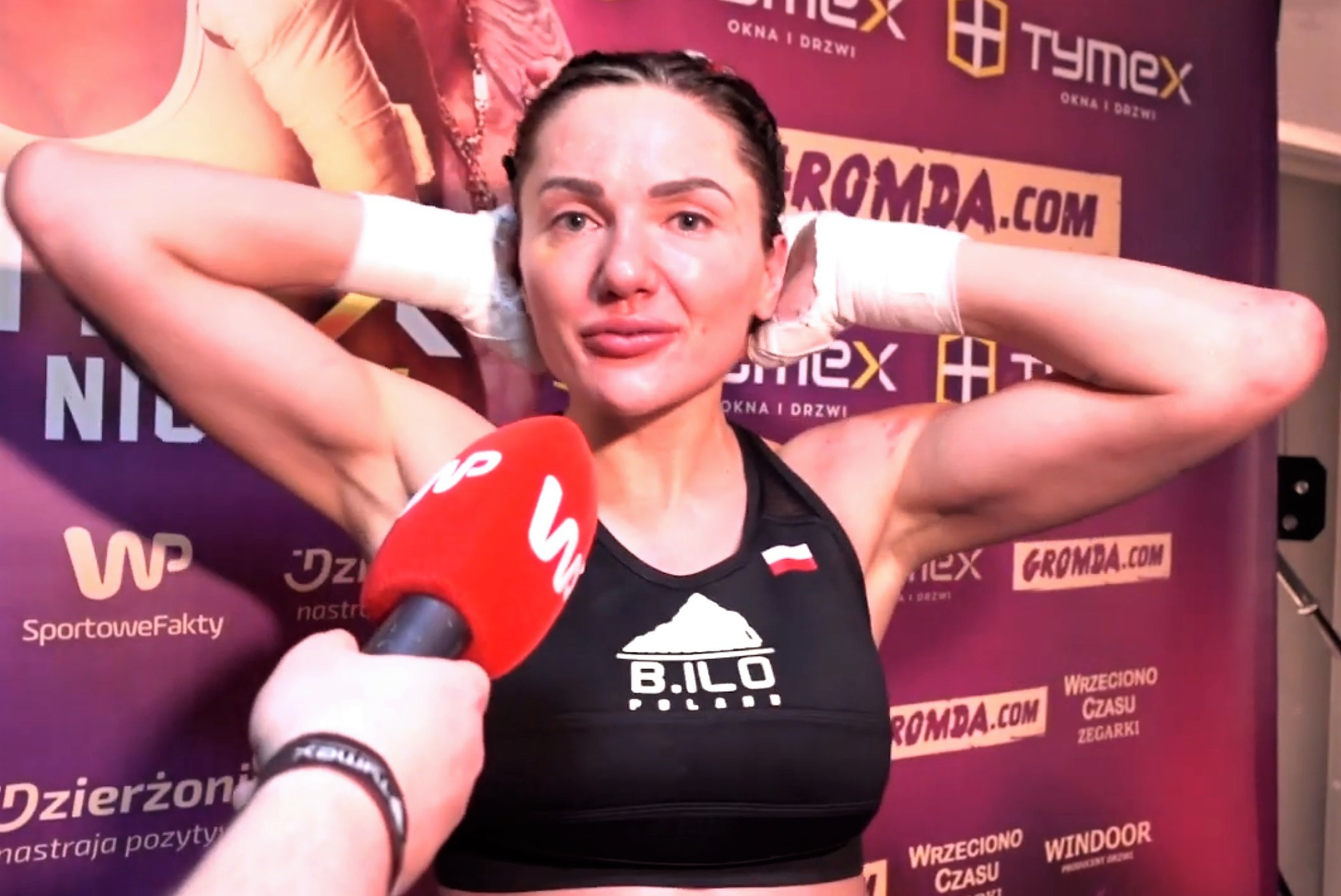
- Ewa Brodnicka interviewed in 2020
- Born: 7 June 1984 (age 42); Nowy Dwór Mazowiecki, Poland
- Other names: Kleo
- Nationality: Polish
- Height: 5 ft 8 in (173 cm)
- Division: Super-featherweight, Lightweight, Light-welterweight (boxing); Bantamweight (MMA)
- Reach: 179 cm (70 in)
- Style: Boxing
- Years active: 2013–21 (Boxing); 2021–present (MMA)

Professional boxing record
- Total: 22
- Wins: 21
- By knockout: 2
- Losses: 1

Mixed martial arts record
- Total: 3
- Wins: 2
- By decision: 2
- Losses: 1
- By knockout: 1

Other information
- Boxing record from BoxRec
- Mixed martial arts record from Sherdog

Ewa Brodnicka (born 7 June 1984) is a Polish former professional boxer and mixed martial artist. During her boxing career she held the WBO female junior-lightweight World title and was European female lightweight champion.

== Professional boxing career ==
A professional boxer since 2013, Brodnicka became European female lightweight champion on 19 December 2015, beating Belgium's Elfi Philips for the vacant belt by unanimous decision.

On 13 May 2017, she won the interim WBO female junior-lightweight World title thanks to a unanimous decision success over Irma Adler from Bosnia.

Upgraded to full champion status, Brodnicka made five successful defences of her title during the next three years.

In her first fight outside of her native Poland, Brodnicka was due to defend her title against Mikaela Mayer at the MGM Grand Las Vegas, USA, on 31 October 2020 but was stripped of the belt prior to the fight after failing to make the 130-pound weight limit. She weighed 130.9 pounds on the first try, coming back to the scales an hour later but, despite cutting off her hair-braids and stripping down, she could not get any lower than 130.1 pounds. The bout went ahead with only Mayer able to claim the title, which she did with a unanimous decision victory.

== Mixed martial arts career ==
Brodnicka made her mixed martial arts (MMA) debut on 28 August 2021 losing to YouTube personality Aniela "Lil Masti" Bogusz by stoppage due to punches in round three of the contest staged by High League at the Ergo Arena in Gdańsk, Poland. After the fight Brodnicka said a knee injury sustained three weeks earlier had hampered her performance.

At the same venue on 4 June 2022, Brodnicka got her first MMA win overcoming Kamila Wybrańczyk by unanimous decision.

She switched promotions to FAME for her next fight on 20 May 2023, when she secured a unanimous decision victory over Marta Linkiewicz at the Atlas Arena in Łódź, Poland.

== Professional boxing record ==
21 fights	20 wins	1 loss
By knockout	2	0
By decision	18	1

No.	Result	Record	Opponent	Type	Round, time	Date	Location	Notes
21	Win	20–1	(Bulgaria) Milena Koleva	UD	8	13 Mar 2021	Sport Hall, Dzierżoniów, Poland	
20	Loss	19–1	(United States) Mikaela Mayer	UD	10	31 Oct 2020	(United States) MGM Grand Conference Center, Paradise, Nevada, US	For vacant WBO female junior-lightweight title
19	Win	19–0	(Belgium) Djemilla Gontaruk	UD	10	7 Mar 2020	Sport Hall, Dzierżoniów, Poland	Retained WBO female junior-lightweight title
18	Win	18–0	(Argentina) Edith Soledad Matthysse	SD	10	4 Oct 2019	Hala Sportowa, Częstochowa, Poland	Retained WBO female junior-lightweight title
17	Win	17–0	(Mexico) Janeth Perez	MD	10	25 May 2019	Hala widowiskowo-sportowa, Jelenia Góra, Poland	Retained WBO female junior-lightweight title
16	Win	16–0	(South Africa) Nozipho Bell	UD	10	26 Oct 2018	MOSiR Hall, Lublin, Poland	Retained WBO female junior-lightweight title
15	Win	15–0	(Canada) Sarah Pucek	UD	10	21 Apr 2018	Hala Sportowa, Częstochowa, Poland	Retained WBO female junior-lightweight title
14	Win	14–0	(Brazil) Viviane Obenauf	SD	10	24 Jun 2017	Ergo Arena, Gdańsk, Poland	
13	Win	13–0	(Bosnia and Herzegovina) Irma Adler	UD	10	13 May 2017	Sport Hall, Częstochowa, Poland	Won WBO interim female junior-lightweight title
12	Win	12–0	(Italy) Anita Torti	UD	10	5 Nov 2016	ICDS Hall, Łomianki, Poland	Retained European female lightweight title
11	Win	11–0	(Georgia (country)) Lela Terashvili	UD	8	24 Sep 2016	Sport Hall, Kalisz, Poland	
10	Win	10–0	(Belgium) Elfi Philips	UD	10	19 Dec 2015	Hall ICDS, Łomianki, Poland	Won vacant European female lightweight title
9	Win	9–0	(Poland) Ewa Piątkowska	SD	8	26 Sep 2015	Atlas Arena, Łódź, Poland	
8	Win	8–0	(Italy) Monica Gentili	UD	8	16 May 2015	Sport Hall, Inowrocław, Poland	
7	Win	7–0	(Hungary) Gina Chamie	UD	8	14 Mar 2015	Cuprum Arena, Lubin, Poland	
6	Win	6–0	(Bulgaria) Galina Gumliiska	UD	6	12 Dec 2014	MOSiR Hall, Radom, Poland	
5	Win	5–0	(Latvia) Jekaterina Lecko	TKO	2 (4)	17 Oct 2014	Sport Hall, Dzierzoniów, Poland	
4	Win	4–0	(Bulgaria) Kremena Petkova	UD	10	26 Apr 2014	Sport Hall, Dzierzoniów, Poland	Won vacant WBF Intercontinental female super-lightweight title
3	Win	3–0	(Czech Republic) Pavla Votavova	TKO	1 (4) 0:45	08 Feb 2014	Sport Hall, Pionki, Poland	
2	Win	2–0	(Poland) Klaudia Szymczak	UD	4	31 Aug 2013	Sportgym Radom, Radom, Poland	
1	Win	1–0	(Bosnia and Herzegovina) Pasa Malagic	PTS	4	16 Feb 2013	Sport Hall, Pionki, Poland	

== Mixed martial arts record ==
Professional record breakdown
3 matches	2 wins	1 loss
By knockout	0	1
By decision	2	0

Res.	Record	Opponent	Method	Event	Date	Round	Time	Location	Notes
Win	2–1	(Poland) Marta Linkiewicz	UD	Fame 18: Crusher vs. Ferrari	20 May 2023	3		Atlas Arena, Łódź, Poland	
Win	1–1	(Poland) Kamila Wybrańczyk	UD	High League 3	4 June 2022	3		Ergo Arena, Gdańsk, Poland	
Loss	0–1	(Poland) Aniela Bogusz	Punches From Crucifix	High League 1	28 August 2021	3	1:13	Ergo Arena, Gdańsk, Poland	

Sporting positions
Regional boxing titles
Vacant Title last held by Nomadithini Ndyambo	WBF International female super-lightweight champion 26 April 2014 – 2015	Vacant Title next held by Oshin Derieuw
Vacant Title last held by Maïva Hamadouche	European female lightweight champion 19 December 2015 – 13 May 2017; Won interim world title	Vacant Title next held by Oleksandra Sidorenko
World boxing titles
New title	WBO female junior-lightweight champion Interim title 13 May 2017 – 2018; Elevated to full champion	Vacant
Vacant Title last held by Ramona Kuehne	WBO female junior-lightweight champion 2018 – 30 October 2020; Stripped	Vacant Title next held by Mikaela Mayer
