= Kirstie Bavington =

English boxer (born 1992)

Personal information
- Nickname: Bavvo
- Born: 21 August 1992 (age 34) Wolverhampton, England
- Weight: Super-lightweight, Welterweight

Boxing career
- Stance: Orthodox

Boxing record
- Total fights: 19
- Wins: 10
- Win by KO: 2
- Losses: 7
- Draws: 2

Kirstie Bavington (born 21 August 1992) is an English professional boxer. She is a two-time former European female welterweight champion and fought in the first-ever professional women's British title contest.

== Professional boxing career ==
Having turned professional in 2018 and compiled a record of two wins and a draw, Bavington fought Cherrelle Brown for the vacant WBC female super-lightweight International title at York Hall in London on 20 July 2019, losing by unanimous decision.

In her seventh fight, she provided the opposition for future WBO female welterweight world champion Sandy Ryan on her pro-debut, going down to a points defeat in the six-round bout at Matchroom HQ Garden in Brentwood, on 31 July 2021.

Bavington won her next two fights before taking on Hungarian boxer Timea Belik for the vacant European female welterweight title on 6 May 2022, claiming the belt with a unanimous decision victory in her hometown of Wolverhampton.

She successfully defended her title on 19 November 2022 against Naomi Mannes from Germany, winning their bout at the Magna Centre in Rotherham by unanimous decision.

Bavington was named women's boxer of the year at the 2022 Midlands Area Board of Control Awards.

She lost by split decision to Canada's Kandi Wyatt in a contest for the vacant WBA female welterweight Intercontinental title at The Hangar Events Venue in Wolverhampton on 10 March 2023 and was subsequently stripped of her European titie.

In April 2023 it was announced that Bavington had been chosen to fight Olympic gold medalist and future world champion Lauren Price in the first-ever female professional British championship bout. She lost the welterweight contest at Resorts World Arena in Birmingham on 6 May 2023 by unanimous decision.

Bavington lost her next fight to April Hunter on the undercard of the Savannah Marshall vs Franchón Crews-Dezurn undisputed female super-middleweight championship showdown at Manchester Arena on 1 July 2023, before getting back to winning ways with a points success against Tereza Dvorakova on 16 February 2024 at H Suite in Edgbaston.

On 19 October 2024, Bavington became a two-time European female welterweight champion by claiming the vacant title with a split decision win over Marine Beauchamp at Espace Mayenne in Laval, France. Two of the ringside judges gave her the fight 98-92 and 97-93 with the third scoring it 96-94 for her opponent.

She was scheduled to face Olympic bronze medalist Cindy Ngamba in a non-title contest at the Royal Albert Hall in London on 7 March 2025. However, Ngamba withdrew from the bout the day before it was set to take place due to an issue discovered during her pre-fight medical.

Having by now given up her European title, Bavington lost to Gemma Richardson on points, 60-54, over six-rounds at bp pulse LIVE in Birmingham on 29 August 2026.

In her next fight she was knocked out in the fourth and final round by Albina Moldazhanova at College Park Center in Arlington, Texas, United States, on 8 November 2026, to suffer the first stoppage defeat of her professional career.

== Personal life ==
Bavington is a PE teacher and has played football for the women's teams at Wolverhampton Wanderers, West Bromwich Albion, Birmingham City, Coventry City, AFC Wimbledon, Kidderminster Harriers and Crystal Palace.

== Professional boxing record ==
19 fights	10 wins	7 losses
By knockout	2	1
By decision	8	6
Draws	2	

No.	Result	Record	Opponent	Type	Round, time	Date	Location	Notes
19	Loss	10–7–2	Albina Moldazhanova	KO	4 (4), 0:44	8 Nov 2026	College Park Center, Arlington, Texas, U.S.	
18	Loss	10–6–2	Gemma Richardson	PTS	6	29 Aug 2026	bp pulse LIVE, Birmingham, England	
17	Win	10–5–2	Linzi Buczynskyj	PTS	4	14 Mar 2026	The Eastside Rooms, Birmingham, England	
16	Win	9–5–2	Marine Beauchamp	SD	10	19 Oct 2024	Espace Mayenne, Laval, France	Won vacant European female welterweight title
15	Win	8–5–2	Tereza Dvorakova	PTS	6	27 Apr 2024	H Suite, Edgbaston, England	
14	Loss	7–5–2	April Hunter	PTS	8	1 Jul 2023	Manchester Arena, Manchester, England	
13	Loss	7–4–2	Lauren Price	UD	10	6 May 2023	Resorts World Arena, Birmingham, England	For vacant British female welterweight title
12	Loss	7–3–2	Kandi Wyatt	SD	10	10 Mar 2023	The Hangar Events Venue, Wolverhampton, England	For vacant WBA female welterweight Intercontinental title
11	Win	7–2–2	Naomi Mannes	UD	10	19 Nov 2022	Magna Centre, Rotherham, England	Retained European female welterweight title
10	Win	6–2–2	Timea Belik	UD	10	6 May 2022	The Hangar Events Venue, Wolverhampton, England	Won vacant European female welterweight title
9	Win	5–2–2	April Hunter	PTS	6	16 Oct 2021	Newcastle Arena, Newcastle, England	
8	Win	4–2–2	Beccy Ferguson	PTS	6	1 Oct 2021	The Hangar Events Venue, Wolverhampton, England	
7	Loss	3–2–2	Sandy Ryan	PTS	6	31 Jul 2021	Matchroom HQ Garden, Brentwood, England	
6	Draw	3–1–2	Vaida Masiokaite	PTS	4	22 Feb 2020	Holte Suite, Villa Park, Birmingham, England	
5	Win	3–1–1	Monika Antonik	TKO	2 (4), 1:20	18 Oct 2019	The Hangar Events Venue, Wolverhampton, England	
4	Loss	2–1–1	Cherrelle Brown	UD	10	20 Jul 2019	York Hall, London, England	For vacant WBC female super-lightweight International title
3	Win	2–0–1	Katarina Vistica	TKO	2 (4), 1:27	9 Mar 2019	Town Hall, Walsall, England	
2	Win	1–0–1	Elaine Greenan	PTS	4	7 Jul 2018	The Venue, Dudley, England	
1	Draw	0–0–1	Borislava Goranova	PTS	4	19 May 2018	Holte Suite, Villa Park, Birmingham, England	
