= Lessebo =

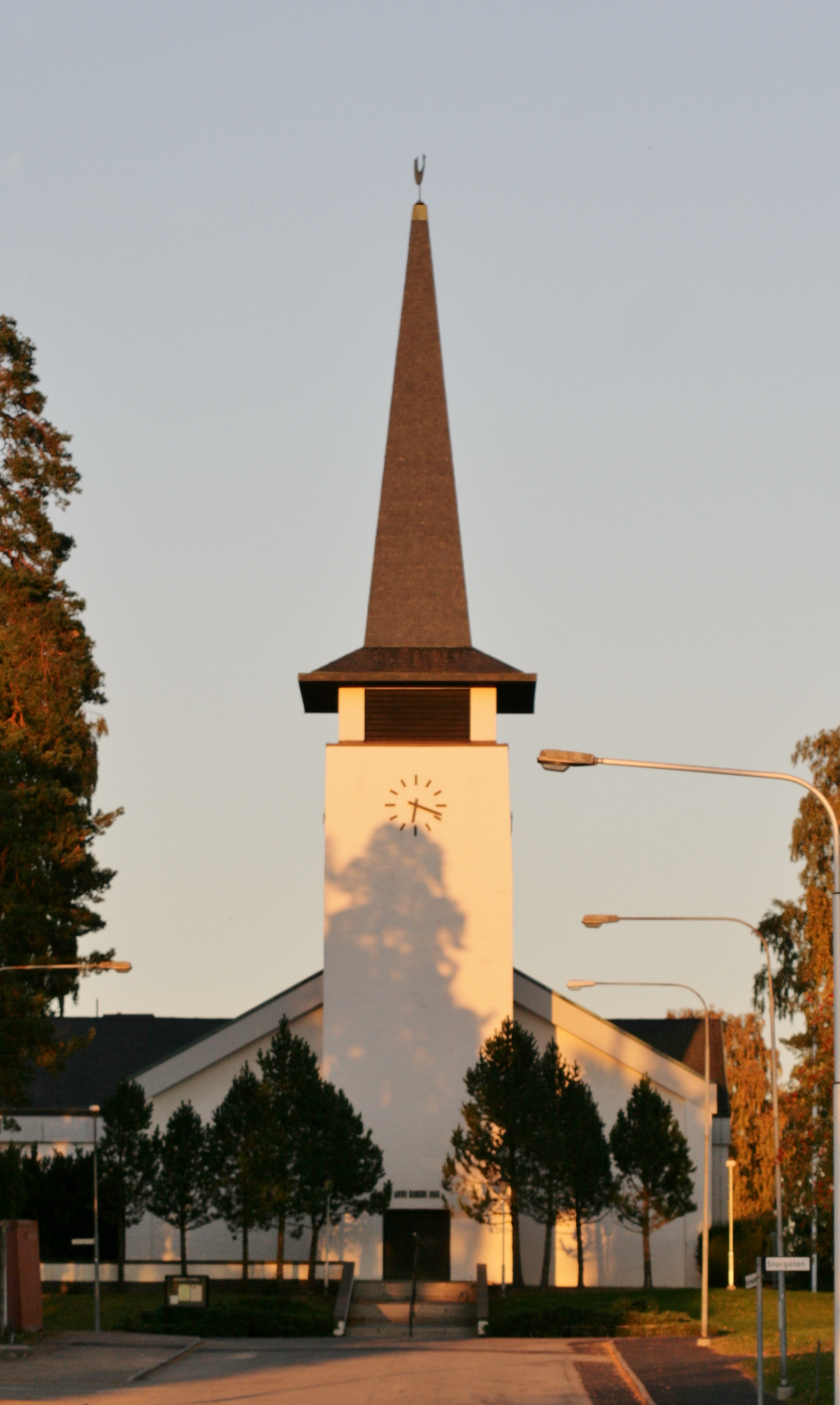
- Lessebo Church

- Location within Kronoberg Location within Sweden
- Coordinates: 56°45′N 15°16′E
- Country: Sweden
- Province: Småland
- County: Kronoberg County
- Municipality: Lessebo Municipality

Area
  - Total: 3.40 km^{2} (1.31 sq mi)

Population (31 December 2010)
  - Total: 2,737
  - Density: 805/km^{2} (2,080/sq mi)
- Time zone: UTC+1 (CET)
  - Summer (DST): UTC+2 (CEST)

Lessebo is a locality and the seat of Lessebo Municipality, Kronoberg County, Sweden with 2,737 inhabitants in 2010. The Lessebo community formed gradually around the paper and iron works that was founded in 1660. Today Vida Paper AB runs the pulp and paper mill as well as The Lessebo Hand Paper Mill which is one of very few commercially run European hand paper mills still existing.

Lessebo is situated in what is called the Kingdom of Crystal, which is the centre of Swedish mouth blown glass production.

Athletes Hugo Wieslander and Truls Möregårdh were both born here. Boxer Lucy Wildheart is also from Lessebo.
