= Chantelle Cameron =

English boxer (born 1991)

Personal information
- Nickname: Il Capo
- Born: 14 May 1991 (age 35) Northampton, England
- Height: 5 ft 8 in (173 cm)
- Weight: Super-lightweight; Super-welterweight
- Website: chancam.co.uk

Boxing career
- Stance: Orthodox

Boxing record
- Total fights: 24
- Wins: 23
- Win by KO: 8
- Losses: 1
Medal record
Women's amateur boxing
Representing England
EU Championships
Silver medal – second place	2010 Keszthely	Light-welterweight
Bronze medal – third place	2011 Katowice	Lightweight

Chantelle Cameron (born 14 May 1991) is an English professional boxer. She has held the WBA and WBC female super-welterweight titles since August 2026, as well as the WBO female super-welterweight title since April 2026. Cameron is also a former undisputed female light-welterweight champion, having held the WBC title between 2020 and 2023; the IBF and Ring magazine titles between 2021 and 2023; and the WBA and WBO titles between November 2022 and 2023. She held the IBO female lightweight title from 2017 to 2019 and light-welterweight title from 2022 to 2023. She held the interim WBC female super-lightweight title from July 2024 until September 2025 when she was elevated to full title holder which she then vacated a month later.

As an amateur, she won a silver medal in the light-welterweight division at the 2010 EU Championships in Keszthely, Hungary, and a bronze in the lightweight division at the 2011 EU Championships in Katowice, Poland, losing to Ireland's Katie Taylor in the semi-finals. Cameron would avenge this loss in May 2023, defeating Taylor via majority decision to retain her undisputed championship, before losing her titles to Taylor in the rematch in November 2023.

== Early life ==
Chantelle Cameron was born on 14 May 1991, in Northampton, England. She credits her love for combat sports to watching films starring Jean-Claude Van Damme and television programme Buffy the Vampire Slayer, stating: "I loved all those fighting films. Kickboxer would have to be my favourite Van Damme film. The fighting in it is unreal. I loved Buffy because of the fight scenes and the fact she was a female role model." Cameron's introduction to combat sports was through kickboxing at the age of 10 at the Ultimate Sport Kickboxing Association (USKA), moving on to Muay Thai at 16. After a successful amateur career—in which she remained undefeated, winning amateur titles in the IKF and WAKO—she switched to boxing at the age of 18.

== Amateur career ==
Cameron won two English women's national championships; the ABA Championships in 2010, and the ABAE Championships in 2015. She reached the quarter-finals of the 2010 AIBA World Championships, losing to eventual silver medalist Vera Slugina of Russia. She also won the silver medal at the 2010 EU Championships, and a bronze the following year at the 2011 EU Championships, losing in the semi-finals to eventual winner Katie Taylor of Ireland.

=== Results ===
2010 | ABA Women's National Championships (63.5 kg)

- Defeated Anastasia Cousins 40–15
- Defeated Nina Meinke 17–16
- Defeated Alanna Murphy 27–15

2010 | European Union Women's Championships (64 kg)

- Defeated Nikolett Papp (Hungary) ?–?
- Defeated Margarita Cheneva (Bulgaria) ?–?
- Lost to Gulsum Tatar (Turkey) 0–4

2010 | AIBA Women's World Championships (64 kg)

- Defeated Iulia Novacioiu (Romania) 12–3
- Defeated Rebecca Price (Wales) 7–5
- Lost to Vera Slugina (Russia) 4–16

2011 | European Union Women's Championships (60 kg)

- Defeated Marija Zovko (Croatia) 30–7
- Defeated Jennifer Miranda (Spain) 19–9
- Lost to Katie Taylor (Ireland) 10–28

2015 | ABAE Women's National Championships (60 kg)

- Defeated Hatty Nylon 3–0
- Defeated Sophie Colbourne 3–0

== Professional career ==
=== Super-featherweight ===
In 2017, Cameron signed a promotional contract with Barry McGuigan's Cyclone Promotions. Under the guidance of Barry's son, Shane McGuigan, she made her professional debut on 26 May 2017, winning a six-round points decision (PTS) against Karina Kopinska at the Motorpoint Arena in Cardiff, Wales.

After scoring technical knockout (TKO) wins over Bojana Libiszewska and Bilitis Gaucher in July and October respectively, Cameron fought Edith Ramos for the vacant IBO Inter-Continental female super-featherweight title on 11 November 2017 at the Royal Highland Centre in Edinburgh, Scotland, winning via third-round TKO.

=== Lightweight ===
==== IBO champion ====
A month later on 2 December, Cameron moved up a weight class to fight for her first world title, in her fifth fight, against Viviane Obenauf at the Leicester Arena in Leicester. She won by sixth-round stoppage via corner retirement (RTD) after Obenauf's corner called off the fight between rounds, capturing the IBO female lightweight title. The first defence of her title came on 3 March 2018, against Myriam Dellal at The SSE Hydro in Glasgow, Scotland. She successfully retained her title via shutout unanimous decision (UD) over ten rounds, with all three judges scoring the bout 100–90 in favour of Cameron. She next scored a sixth-round TKO win in June over Natalia Vanesa del Valle Aguirre in a non-title fight, before making a second defence against Jessica Gonzalez on 13 October at the York Hall in London, with the vacant WBC Silver female lightweight title also on the line. Throughout the fight Cameron used footwork and stayed behind the jab, landing straight right hands and uppercuts on her opponent. Gonzalez was down on the canvas in the first-round, only for referee Ian John Lewis to rule it a slip. The Mexican fighter suffered a cut in the second-round from an accidental clash of heads. In the ninth, Gonzalez was deducted a point for hitting Cameron in the back of the head, while in a clinch, after the referee had called for the fighters to separate. Cameron won via shutout UD with the judges' scorecards reading 100–89, 100–88, and 100–88, retaining her IBO title and capturing the vacant WBC Silver title.

In February 2019, Cameron announced on Twitter she had left Cyclone Promotions and trainer Shane McGuigan, stating, "...they know the distress they have caused me and how isolated they made me feel, humiliated and just deflated, they had no time for a female boxer", as well as citing training issues; "My last fight camp was four weeks and I'm sick of the circumstances of chasing money and it's been seen in my most recent performance (Jessica Gonzalez)". She has since joined up with MTK Global and trainer Jamie Moore.

==== Further world title ambitions ====
Her first fight under MTK came in April, winning via second-round TKO in a non-title bout against Feriche Mashauri. This was followed by another non-title bout in May, again winning by second-round TKO against Vaida Masiokaite. Following her win over Masiokaite, Cameron relinquished her IBO title, saying, "I wish to thank the IBO for their support and introducing me to the world stage as a major force in women's boxing. I will relinquish my IBO title to enable other female fighters to fight for this important title and to enhance their careers as well."

Her next fight was against Anisha Basheel in a WBC lightweight final eliminator on 20 July at the Brentwood Centre in Essex, England. Cameron's WBC Silver title was on the line with the winner gaining a chance to face WBA, WBC, IBF, WBO, and The Ring champion Katie Taylor for the undisputed female lightweight title. In a fight that outlets described as a dominant performance, Cameron scored a UD victory. With Cameron keeping behind the jab for the first few rounds, Basheel appeared to have trouble figuring out the former champion. Cameron stepped up the pressure from round five and onwards, unloading power punches in combinations and landing at will, rarely troubled by her opponent. Two judges scored the bout 100–89, while the third scored it 100–90, securing Cameron a mandatory shot at Katie Taylor.

=== Light-welterweight ===
For her next fight, Cameron moved up another weight class to face former three-weight world champion Anahí Ester Sánchez. Cameron said on the decision to move up in weight, "I am not waiting around for Katie Taylor. That's why I have moved up in weight for this final eliminator, because I want to face any world champion." The fight took place on 9 November 2019 at the York Hall, in what was a WBC light-welterweight final eliminator, with the winner earning a chance to face unified WBA and WBC champion Jessica McCaskill. After knocking Sanchez down in the ninth-round, Cameron went on to win the fight by UD to claim the WBC mandatory position in a second weight class. Two judges scored the bout 100–89 while the third scored it 99–90.

It was announced in July 2020 that Cameron signed a multi-fight promotional contract with Eddie Hearn's Matchroom Sport.

==== WBC champion vs. Araújo, Hernández ====
In early September 2020, it was revealed that the WBC had approved Cameron to face 2012 Olympic bronze medalist Adriana Araújo for the WBC female light-welterweight title, which McCaskill relinquished in order to defeat Cecilia Brækhus to become the undisputed female welterweight champion. On 15 September, Cameron's new promoter, Eddie Hearn, announced that the bout will take place on 4 October, with a venue yet to be announced. Cameron said of the match up, "This chance I've been given is huge, I've finally got the platform to make myself a star. I won't take my opportunity for granted and will be taking every precaution to ensure I use this chance to shine. I want to make my dreams come true to unify and become a world champion with all of the belts, not just one."

With the Marshall Arena in Milton Keynes being chosen as the venue, Araújo failed to make weight at the pre-fight weigh-in—weighing 5 pounds (2.3 kg) over the 10 stone (64 kg) light-welterweight limit—meaning the vacant title would only be on the line for Cameron. After staying behind the jab and following up with combination punches for ten rounds, with Araújo offering little resistance, Cameron won by a shutout UD in what outlets described as a dominant win. All three judges scored the bout 100–90 to award Cameron her first major world title.

In January 2021, it was announced that Cameron would make the first defence of her WBC title against former world champion Melissa Hernández, with the bout scheduled to take place on 20 March as part of the undercard for Lawrence Okolie's world title fight against Krzysztof Głowacki at a venue yet to be named. After Cameron suffered a hand injury during training, the bout was rescheduled to 29 May and took place at the Michelob Ultra Arena in Paradise, Nevada, as part of the undercard of the Devin Haney vs. Jorge Linares world title fight. Cameron landed a flurry of punches in the fourth round, sending her opponent reeling into the ropes. Referee Celestino Ruiz determined that the ropes had held Hernández up and issued a standing eight count, giving Cameron a 10–8 round. In the next round, after Cameron landed another flurry of punches with no response from Hernández, Ruiz stepped in and called a halt to the contest at 1 minute and 38 seconds into the round to award Cameron a fifth-round TKO victory.

==== Unification vs. McGee ====
In September 2021, it was announced that Cameron would put her title on the line in a unification bout against IBF female light-welterweight champion Mary McGee, with the inaugural Ring title also on the line. The bout took place on 30 October at The O2 Arena, with Cameron emerging victorious via UD. The judges' scorecards reading 100–90, 99–91 and 99–92.

==== Undisputed World Champion ====
In November 2022, Cameron defeated Jessica McCaskill in a match held in Abu Dhabi, making Cameron the undisputed world light-welterweight champion and the United Kingdom’s first undisputed female boxing world champion.

==== Cameron vs. Taylor ====
On 2 March, Cameron accepted a public challenge from undisputed lightweight champion Katie Taylor for a fight for Cameron's undisputed super-lightweight titles. The bout was subsequently announced by Eddie Hearn on 11 March to be taking place at the 3Arena in Dublin on 20 May.

Cameron emerged victorious via majority decision with the judge's scorecards reading 95–95, 96–94 and 96–94.

==== Cameron vs. Taylor II ====
On 25 November 2023 at 3Arena in Dublin, Ireland, Cameron has been scheduled to face Katie Taylor in the championship rematch. Cameron lost a majority decision to Taylor.

=== Trainer change and signing with Frank Warren ===
Having already parted ways with her trainer, Jamie Moore, and switched to work under the guidance of Sheffield-based Grant Smith earlier in the year, Cameron split from promotors Matchroom in May 2024 signing up with Frank Warren's Queensbury Promotions.

=== Cameron vs. Mekhaled ===
Cameron won the vacant interim WBC female super-lightweight title with a majority decision victory over France's Elhem Mekhaled at Resorts World Arena in Birmingham on 20 July 2024. Two ringside judges scored the fight in her favour 98-92 and 99-92 while the third gave it as a 95-95 draw.

=== Cameron vs. Berghult ===
Cameron defended her title with a unanimous decision win over Patricia Berghult at Resorts World Arena in Birmingham on 2 November 2024. The three ringside judges scored the fight 99-91, 100-90 and 98-92.

=== Switch to Most Valuable Promotions ===
After just two fights under the Queensbury banner, Cameron signed with Jake Paul's Most Valuable Promotions in May 2025.

=== Cameron vs. Camara ===
Cameron defended her interim WBC female super-lightweight title against Jessica Camara at Madison Square Garden, New York City, New York, on 11 July 2025, winning by unanimous decision.

=== Full WBC super-lightweight champion and title vacation ===
On 23 September 2025, she was elevated to full WBC female super-lightweight champion after Katie Taylor vacated the title. Cameron then vacated the title, just over a month later, on 31 October 2025, stating her decision was in protest at female boxers not being allowed compete under the same rules as men. She said: "I've always believed in equality, and that includes the choice to fight equal rounds, equal opportunities, and equal respect," adding "it's time to take a stand for what's right and for the future of the sport."

=== WBO super-welterweight champion ===
==== Cameron vs. Kotaskova ====
Cameron faced Michaela Kotaskova for the vacant WBO female super-welterweight title at Olympia London on 5 April 2026. She won by unanimous decision.

==== Cameron vs. Mayer ====
Holding the WBO female super-welterweight title, Cameron faced unified WBA and WBC female super-welterweight champion Mikaela Mayer in a championship unification bout at bp pulse LIVE in Birmingham, on 29 August 2026. She won by unanimous decision.

== Professional boxing record ==
23 fights	22 wins	1 loss
By knockout	8	0
By decision	14	1

No.	Result	Record	Opponent	Type	Round, time	Date	Location	Notes
24	Win	23–1	Mikaela Mayer	UD	10	29 Aug 2026	bp pulse LIVE, Birmingham, England	Retained WBO female super welterweight title title; Won WBA and WBC female super welterweight title
23	Win	22–1	Michaela Kotaskova	UD	10	5 Apr 2026	Olympia London, Kensington, England	Won vacant WBO female super-welterweight title
22	Win	21–1	Jessica Camara	UD	10	11 Jul 2025	Madison Square Garden, New York City, New York, U.S.	Retained WBC interim female super-lightweight title
21	Win	20–1	Patricia Berghult	UD	10	2 Nov 2024	Resorts World Arena, Birmingham, England	Retained WBC interim female super-lightweight title
20	Win	19–1	Elhem Mekhaled	MD	10	20 Jul 2024	Resorts World Arena, Birmingham, England	Won vacant WBC interim female super-lightweight title
19	Loss	18–1	Katie Taylor	MD	10	25 Nov 2023	3Arena, Dublin, Ireland	Lost WBA, WBC, IBF, WBO, IBO and The Ring female light-welterweight titles
18	Win	18–0	Katie Taylor	MD	10	20 May 2023	3Arena, Dublin, Ireland	Retained WBA, WBC, IBF, WBO, IBO and The Ring female light-welterweight titles
17	Win	17–0	Jessica McCaskill	UD	10	5 Nov 2022	Etihad Arena, Abu Dhabi, United Arab Emirates	Retained WBC, IBF and The Ring female light-welterweight titles; Won vacant WBA, WBO, and IBO female light-welterweight titles
16	Win	16–0	Victoria Bustos	UD	10	21 May 2022	The O2 Arena, London, England	Retained WBC, IBF and The Ring female light-welterweight titles
15	Win	15–0	Mary McGee	UD	10	30 Oct 2021	The O2 Arena, London, England	Retained WBC female light-welterweight title; Won IBF and inaugural The Ring female light-welterweight titles
14	Win	14–0	Melissa Hernández	TKO	5 (10), 1:25	29 May 2021	Michelob Ultra Arena, Paradise, Nevada, US	Retained WBC female light-welterweight title
13	Win	13–0	Adriana Araújo	UD	10	4 Oct 2020	Marshall Arena, Milton Keynes, England	Won vacant WBC female light-welterweight title
12	Win	12–0	Anahí Ester Sánchez	UD	10	9 Nov 2019	York Hall, London, England	
11	Win	11–0	Anisha Basheel	UD	10	20 Jul 2019	Brentwood Centre, Brentwood, England	Retained WBC Silver female lightweight title
10	Win	10–0	Vaida Masiokaite	TKO	2 (6), 0:33	18 May 2019	The SSE Hydro, Glasgow, Scotland	
9	Win	9–0	Feriche Mashauri	TKO	2 (6), 1:39	26 Apr 2019	York Hall, London, Scotland	
8	Win	8–0	Jessica Gonzalez	UD	10	13 Oct 2018	York Hall, London, England	Retained IBO female lightweight title; Won vacant WBC Silver female lightweight title
7	Win	7–0	Natalia Vanesa del Valle Aguirre	TKO	6 (10), 1:31	23 Jun 2018	The SSE Hydro, Glasgow, Scotland	
6	Win	6–0	Myriam Dellal	UD	10	3 Mar 2018	The SSE Hydro, Glasgow, Scotland	Retained IBO female lightweight title
5	Win	5–0	Viviane Obenauf	RTD	6 (10), 2:00	2 Dec 2017	Leicester Arena, Leicester, England	Won vacant IBO female lightweight title
4	Win	4–0	Edith Ramos	TKO	3 (10), 1:04	11 Nov 2017	Royal Highland Centre, Edinburgh, Scotland	Won vacant IBO Inter-Continental female super-featherweight title
3	Win	3–0	Bilitis Gaucher	TKO	1 (8), 1:14	7 Oct 2017	York Hall, London, England	
2	Win	2–0	Bojana Libiszewska	TKO	4 (6), 0:47	8 Jul 2017	Braehead Arena, Glasgow, Scotland	
1	Win	1–0	Karina Kopinska	PTS	6	26 May 2017	Cardiff International Arena, Cardiff, Wales	

Sporting positions
Regional boxing titles
New title	IBO Inter-Continental female super-featherweight champion 11 November 2017 – 2017; Vacated	Vacant
Vacant Title last held by Maïva Hamadouche	WBC Silver female lightweight champion 13 October 2018 – present	Vacant
Minor world boxing titles
Vacant Title last held by Marie Riederer	IBO female lightweight champion 2 December 2017 – June 2018; Vacated	Vacant Title next held by Estelle Mossely
Vacant Title last held by Kali Reis	IBO female light-welterweight champion 5 November 2022 – 25 November 2023	Succeeded by Katie Taylor
Major world boxing titles
Vacant Title last held by Jessica McCaskill	WBC female light-welterweight champion 4 October 2020 – 25 November 2023	Succeeded by Katie Taylor
Preceded by Mary McGee	IBF female light-welterweight champion 30 October 2021 – 25 November 2023	Succeeded by Katie Taylor
Inaugural champion	The Ring female light-welterweight champion 30 October 2021 – 25 November 2023	Succeeded by Katie Taylor
Vacant Title last held by Kali Reis	WBA female light-welterweight champion 5 November 2022 – 25 November 2023	Succeeded by Katie Taylor
Vacant Title last held by Kali Reis	WBO female light-welterweight champion 5 November 2022 – 25 November 2023	Succeeded by Katie Taylor
Inaugural champion	Undisputed female light-welterweight champion 5 November 2022 – 25 November 2023	Succeeded by Katie Taylor
