= Kandi Wyatt =

Canadian boxer (born 1991)

Personal information
- Nickname: Krush
- Born: 26 March 1991 (age 35)
- Height: 5 ft 7 in (170 cm)
- Weight: Light welterweight; Welterweight

Boxing career
- Reach: 69 in (175 cm)
- Stance: Orthodox

Boxing record
- Total fights: 19
- Wins: 13
- Win by KO: 4
- Losses: 6

Kandi Renae Wyatt (born 26 March 1991) is a Canadian professional boxer who has challenged for world championships in two weight classes on four separate occasions.

== Professional career ==
Wyatt made her professional debut on 5 December 2014, scoring a fourth-round technical knockout (TKO) victory against Christina Barry at the Shaw Conference Centre in Edmonton, Alberta, Canada.

After compiling a record of 8–0 (3 KOs), she faced Christina Linardatou for the vacant WBO female light welterweight title on 24 March 2019 in Athens, Greece. In what was the first world championship boxing match to be held in Greece, Wyatt was knocked down three times in the sixth round en route to the first defeat of her career, losing via sixth-round TKO.

After two more victories she faced Kali Reis for the vacant WBA female light welterweight title on 6 November 2020 at the Marriott Clearwater in St. Petersburg, Florida. In her second world championship attempt Wyatt suffered a ten-round unanimous decision (UD) loss, with the judges' scorecards reading 96–94, 97–93 and 97–92.

Following a UD defeat against Alma Ibarra in August 2021, Wyatt faced reigning champion Jessica McCaskill for the undisputed female welterweight title on 4 December at the MGM Grand Garden Arena in Paradise, Nevada. Wyatt suffered the third defeat of her career, losing via seventh-round TKO.

Wyatt won a split decision against Kirstie Bavington to claim the vacant WBA female welterweight Intercontinental title in Wolverhampton, England, on 10 March 2023.

In her next fight on 1 July 2023, she challenged for the vacant IBF female welterweight World title at Manchester Arena in England but was stopped in the eighth-round by Natasha Jonas.

Wyatt returned to the ring on 2 February 2024, suffering a unanimous decision loss in a six-round contest against Maricela Cornejo at Caribe Royale Orlando.

She got back to winning ways on 4 May 2024, defeating Angelika Oles by unanimous decision in another six-rounder held at River Cree Resort Casino in Edmonton, before following that up with a last round stoppage success over Jaime Clampitt in an eight-round contest at Mohegan Sun Casino on 15 June 2024.

== Professional boxing record ==
19 fights	13 wins	6 losses
By knockout	4	3
By decision	9	3

No.	Result	Record	Opponent	Type	Round, time	Date	Location	Notes
19	Win	13–6	Jaime Clampitt	TKO	8 (8)	15 June 2024	Mohegan Sun Casino, Uncasville, Connecticut, U.S.	
18	Win	12–6	Angelika Oles	UD	6	4 May 2024	River Cree Resort Casino, Edmonton, Alberta, Canada	
17	Loss	11–6	Maricela Cornejo	UD	8	2 Feb 2024	Caribe Royale Orlando, Orlando, Florida, U.S.	
16	Loss	11–5	Natasha Jonas	TKO	8 (10)	1 Jul 2023	Manchester Arena, Manchester, England	For vacant IBF female welterweight World title
15	Win	11–4	Kirstie Bavington	SD	10	10 Mar 2023	The Hangar Events Venue, Wolverhampton, England	For vacant WBA female Intercontinental title
14	Loss	10–4	Jessica McCaskill	TKO	7 (10), 0:19	4 Dec 2021	MGM Grand Garden Arena, Paradise, Nevada, U.S.	For WBA, WBC, IBF, WBO, IBO, and The Ring female welterweight titles
13	Loss	10–3	Alma Ibarra	UD	8	20 Aug 2021	Sycuan Casino, El Cajon, California, U.S.	
12	Loss	10–2	Kali Reis	UD	10	6 Nov 2020	Marriott Clearwater, St. Petersburg, Florida, U.S.	For vacant WBA female light welterweight title
11	Win	10–1	Beatriz Aguilar	UD	6	15 Feb 2020	Deerfoot Inn & Casino, Calgary, Alberta, Canada	
10	Win	9–1	Dayanna González	UD	6	28 Sep 2019	Deerfoot Inn & Casino, Calgary, Alberta, Canada	
9	Loss	8–1	Christina Linardatou	TKO	6 (10)	24 Mar 2019	Athens, Greece	For vacant WBO female light welterweight title
8	Win	8–0	Dalila Velazquez	UD	6	19 Jan 2019	Deerfoot Inn & Casino, Calgary, Alberta, Canada	
7	Win	7–0	Zsofia Bedö	TKO	2 (8), 1:43	3 Nov 2018	Deerfoot Inn & Casino, Calgary, Alberta, Canada	
6	Win	6–0	Guadalupe Lincer Ortiz	UD	6	8 Sep 2018	Deerfoot Inn & Casino, Calgary, Alberta, Canada	
5	Win	5–0	Erika Jeanette Hernández	UD	6	26 May 2018	Grey Eagle Resort and Casino, Calgary, Alberta, Canada	
4	Win	4–0	Heidy Martinez	UD	4	14 Oct 2017	Genesis Centre, Calgary, Alberta, Canada	
3	Win	3–0	Maria Guzman	TKO	1 (4), 1:55	24 Jun 2017	Genesis Centre, Calgary, Alberta, Canada	
2	Win	2–0	Lita Mae Button	UD	4	20 Mar 2015	Shaw Conference Centre, Edmonton, Alberta, Canada	
1	Win	1–0	Christina Barry	TKO	4 (4), 1:29	5 Dec 2014	Shaw Conference Centre, Edmonton, Alberta, Canada	
