= Lisa Greer =

American philanthropist

Lisa Zola Greer is an American philanthropist, known for her 2020 book on philanthropy.

== Education and career ==
Lisa Zola Greer is a philanthropist, nonprofit advisor, convener, and bestselling author of Philanthropy Revolution and The Essential Fundraiser’s Handbook. An advocate for transforming fundraising, Lisa has trained and spoken to a number of fundraisers worldwide, including groups such as AFP, CASE, APRA, Philanthropy Ireland, Fundraising Everywhere, Jewish Funder’s Network, and the UK Chartered Institute of Fundraising.

In 2020 and 2021, Greer spoke about how philanthropists make decisions regarding additional financial support needed during the COVID-19 pandemic. In 2021, she gave the keynote address at the Association of Fundraising Professionals of West Michigan Meeting.

Over the past decade, Lisa has hosted nearly 200 charitable salons at her Beverly Hills home. In 2020 she was appointed to the California State Commission on the Status of Women and Girls on which she still currently serves, sits on the boards of ALLMEP (The Alliance for Middle East Peace), MatchNice, Jewish Story Partners, and New Jewish Narrative, and has held leadership roles with Cedars-Sinai Board of Governors, the New Israel Fund., and the Jewish Community Foundation of Los Angeles. Other board participation includes the L.A. District Attorney’s Crime Prevention Foundation, Make-a-Wish of Greater Los Angeles, and Girl Scouts of Greater Los Angeles, among others.

Lisa’s career spans leadership in media, business, and philanthropy, including time as a studio executive at NBC and Universal Studios. She has an undergraduate degree from University of California, Los Angeles and was the commencement speaker at the 2018 graduation at the University of California, Los Angeles. She also earned an MBA from Pepperdine University. She is now a doctoral candidate at the Lilly Family School of Philanthropy.

== Selected publications ==
- Greer, Lisa (2020). Philanthropy Revolution: How to Inspire Donors, Build Relationships, and Make a Difference. Larissa Kostoff. London. ISBN 978-0-00-838158-5. OCLC 1151981895.
  - Discussed in Jacobin magazine and reviewed by Stanford Social Innovation Review and Alliance magazine
- Greer, Lisa (2024). The Essential Fundraiser's Handbook: A Guide to Maximizing Donations, Retaining Donors, and Saving the Giving Sector for Good. Xeno Books. ISBN 978-1-939096-15-9.

== Personal life ==
A Los Angeles native, Lisa is the mother of three Millennials, two Gen Z'ers, and two dogs. Greer lives in Beverly Hills and was honored by the Friends of the Virginia Robinson Gardens for her contributions to the community, and front page article in The Beverly Hills Courier described her works in the community. In a 2016 article in Harper's Magazine, Greer discussed her installation of a lawn of drought-resistant grass in response to increasing water bills during the California drought.
