= Cherrelle Brown =

English boxer (born 1986)

Personal information
- Nickname: The Hummingbird
- Born: 11 July 1986 (age 39)
- Weight: Super-lightweight

Boxing career
- Stance: Orthodox

Boxing record
- Total fights: 6
- Wins: 6
- Win by KO: 2

Cherrelle Brown (born 11 July 1986) is an English former boxer. As an amateur she was three-time England Boxing national elite female under 64 kg champion, while during her professional career she won the WBC female super-lightweight International title.

== Career ==
Brown took up boxing at the age of 25. Fighting out of Islington ABC in London, she won the England Boxing National Amateur Championships in the female elite under 64 kg category three years in a row between 2015 and 2017.

Representing England, Brown won a gold medal at the 2015 GB Elite Three Nations championships, defeating Rosie Eccles from Wales in the under 64 kg final at the Magna Centre in Rotherham.

Having compiled an amateur record of 31 wins and five losses, she turned professional in 2018 and in her sixth pro-fight claimed the vacant WBC female super-lightweight International title thanks to a unanimous decision victory over Kirstie Bavington at York Hall in London on 20 July 2019.

== Professional boxing record ==
6 fights	6 wins	0 losses
By knockout	2	0
By decision	4	0

No.	Result	Record	Opponent	Type	Round, time	Date	Location	Notes
6	Win	6–0	Kirstie Bavington	UD	10	20 Jul 2019	York Hall, London, England	Won vacant WBC female super-lightweight International title
5	Win	5–0	Vaida Masiokaite	PTS	6	6 Apr 2019	York Hall, London, England	
4	Win	4–0	Borislava Goranova	PTS	6	30 Nov 2018	York Hall, London, England	
3	Win	3–0	Sylwia Maksym	PTS	6	30 Jun 2018	York Hall, London, England	
2	Win	2–0	Katarina Vistica	KO	2 (6), 0:44	28 Apr 2018	York Hall, London, England	
1	Win	1–0	Monika Antonik	TKO	2 (6), 1:29	10 Mar 2018	Camden Centre, King's Cross, London, England	
