= Christina Linardatou =

Greek boxer

Personal information
- Nicknames: Medusa; Black Mamba
- Nationality: Dominican/Greek
- Born: 4 March 1988 (age 38) Santiago de los Caballeros, Dominican Republic
- Height: 1.63 m (5 ft 4 in)
- Weight: Super-featherweight; Lightweight; Light-welterweight

Boxing career
- Stance: Orthodox

Boxing record
- Total fights: 17
- Wins: 14
- Win by KO: 6
- Losses: 3

Christina Linardatou Durán (born 4 March 1988) is a Dominican professional boxer. She is a two-time WBO female junior-welterweight champion, having won the title in 2019 and 2020. As of September 2020, she is ranked as the world's best active female junior-welterweight by The Ring and third BoxRec.

== Career ==
=== Early career ===
Born in Santiago de los Caballeros, Dominican Republic, Linardatou moved to Greece when she was a child. Later, she started to train for boxing.

=== Professional career ===
After several fights in Greece, Linardatou moved to the Dominican Republic to start her professional career.

On 4 June 2016, Linardatou made her first attempt at a world championship, challenging Delfine Persoon for the WBC female lightweight title at Sporthal Schiervelde in Roeselare, Belgium, losing by unanimous decision.

On 24 March 2019, Linardatou won the vacant WBO female junior welterweight title, after beating Kandi Wyatt via technical knockout in round six. This was the first world championship bout held in Greece.

On 7 June 2019, Linardatou made the first defense of her title, defeating Deanha Hobbs by unanimous decision over ten rounds in a bout held at the Galatsi Olympic Hall in Athens.

She relinquished her titles after she became pregnant. She gave birth in September 2021.

== Professional boxing record ==
| 17 fights | 14 wins | 3 losses |
|---|---|---|
| By knockout | 6 | 0 |
| By decision | 8 | 3 |

| No. | Result | Record | Opponent | Type | Round | Date | Location | Notes |
|---|---|---|---|---|---|---|---|---|
| 17 | Loss | 14–3 | (United States) Alycia Baumgardner | UD | 10 | 15 Jul 2023 | (United States) Detroit The Masonic Temple Detroit Michigan, U.S. | For WBC, IBF, WBO, WBA, IBO & The Ring female super featherweight titles |
| 16 | Win | 14–2 | (Serbia) Aleksandra Vujovic | UD | 6 | 27 Jun 2022 | Kavala Macedonia, Greece | |
| 15 | Win | 13–2 | (France) Prisca Vicot | UD | 10 | 8 Feb 2020 | (United States) Civic Center, Hammond, Indiana, US | Won vacant WBO female junior-welterweight title |
| 14 | Loss | 12–2 | (Republic of Ireland) Katie Taylor | UD | 10 | 2 Nov 2019 | (United Kingdom) Manchester Arena, Manchester, England | Lost WBO female junior-welterweight title |
| 13 | Win | 12–1 | (Australia) Deanha Hobbs | UD | 10 | 7 Jun 2019 | Galatsi Olympic Hall, Athens, Greece | Retained WBO female junior-welterweight title |
| 12 | Win | 11–1 | (Canada) Kandi Wyatt | TKO | 6 (10) | 24 Mar 2019 | Athens, Greece | Won vacant WBO female junior-welterweight title |
| 11 | Win | 10–1 | (United States) Alycia Baumgardner | SD | 8 | 28 Jul 2018 | (United States) Davis Arena, Louisville, Kentucky, U.S. | Won WBC International female super-featherweight title |
| 10 | Win | 9–1 | (Bosnia and Herzegovina) Andreja Bešter | PTS | 6 | 19 Nov 2016 | Master Gym, Duisburg, Germany | |
| 9 | Loss | 8–1 | (Belgium) Delfine Persoon | UD | 10 | 4 Jun 2016 | Sporthal Schiervelde, Roeselare, Belgium | For WBC female lightweight title |
| 8 | Win | 8–0 | (Georgia (country)) Lela Terashvili | KO | 3 (8), 1:20 | 19 Mar 2016 | Athens, Greece | |
| 7 | Win | 7–0 | (United Kingdom) Sam Smith | PTS | 10 | 29 Nov 2015 | (United Kingdom) Aria Suite, Leeds, England | |
| 6 | Win | 6–0 | (Dominican Republic) Yoseidy Zarzuela | UD | 8 | 25 Apr 2015 | Club La Clubada, Santiago de los Caballeros, Dominican Republic | |
| 5 | Win | 5–0 | (Dominican Republic) Carolina Martínez de Moreta | TKO | 2 (6), 1:57 | 13 Feb 2015 | Polideportivo Laguna Salada, Valverde, Dominican Republic | |
| 4 | Win | 4–0 | (Dominican Republic) Evelina Díaz | RTD | 1 (6), 2:00 | 1 Nov 2014 | Momo Car Wash, Salcedo, Dominican Republic | |
| 3 | Win | 3–0 | (Dominican Republic) Yoseidy Zarzuela | UD | 6 | 1 Oct 2014 | Club Juan Antonio Alix, Santiago de los Caballeros, Dominican Republic | |
| 2 | Win | 2–0 | (Dominican Republic) Rocío de León | TKO | 1 (6), 1:50 | 9 Aug 2014 | Club La Clubada, Santiago de los Caballeros, Dominican Republic | |
| 1 | Win | 1–0 | (Dominican Republic) Claribel Ferreras | TKO | 1 (4), 1:12 | 19 Jul 2014 | Coliseo Pedro Julio Nolasco, La Romana, Dominican Republic | |

Sporting positions
Regional boxing titles
| Preceded by Alycia Baumgardner | WBC International female super-featherweight champion 28 July 2018 – 2019; Vacated | Vacant Title next held by Kalliopi Kourouni |
World boxing titles
| Vacant Title last held by Amanda Serrano | WBO female junior-welterweight champion 24 March 2019 – 2 November 2019 | Succeeded by Katie Taylor |
| Vacant Title last held by Katie Taylor | WBO female junior-welterweight champion 8 February 2020 – 2021; Vacated | Vacant |
