= Rhiannon Dixon =

English boxer (born 1995)

Personal information
- Born: 16 April 1995 (age 31) Warrington, Cheshire, England
- Weight: Lightweight, Super-featherweight

Boxing career
- Stance: Southpaw

Boxing record
- Total fights: 12
- Wins: 11
- Win by KO: 1
- Losses: 1

Rhiannon Dixon (born 16 April 1995) is an English professional boxer. She is a former WBO female lightweight champion. Dixon has also held the Commonwealth and European female lightweight titles.

== Biography ==
A qualified pharmacist with a degree from Manchester University, Dixon took up boxing aged 21 and turned professional in 2019.

She defeated Vicky Wilkinson by technical knockout to win the vacant Commonwealth female lightweight title at Liverpool Arena on 11 March 2023.

Dixon claimed the vacant European female lightweight championship on 30 September 2023, with victory against Katharina Thanderz by unanimous decision at Wembley Arena.

On 13 April 2024, Dixon defeated Karen Elizabeth Carabajal by unanimous decision at Manchester Arena to win the vacant WBO female lightweight title.

Dixon was due to defend her world title against fellow English boxer Terri Harper at Manchester's Co-op Live Arena on 24 August 2024, but the fight was moved to take place on 28 September 2024 at Sheffield Arena after an injury to Jack Catterall who had been scheduled to headline the original bill. The venue was later changed again to the Copper Box Arena in London but the date was unaltered after the Sheffield show was cancelled. On 6 September 2024, it was announced that the bout had been moved once more, this time to Canon Medical Arena in Sheffield as the main event, but still on 28 September 2024. When the fight finally took place, Harper won by unanimous decision to inflict the first loss of Dixon's professional career.

After losing her world title, Dixon announced she intended to drop down in weight divisions and campaign at super-featherweight, but these plans were put on hold for more than two years due to a foot injury she sustained in training which required surgery. She eventually made her return to the competitive boxing ring with a 60–55 points win over Lenka Volejnikova in a six-round bout at Boxpark in Liverpool on 21 November 2026.

== Professional boxing record ==
| 12 fights | 11 wins | 1 loss |
|---|---|---|
| By knockout | 1 | 0 |
| By decision | 10 | 1 |

| No. | Result | Record | Opponent | Type | Round, time | Date | Location | Notes |
|---|---|---|---|---|---|---|---|---|
| 12 | Win | 11–1 | Lenka Volejnikova | PTS | 6 | 2026-11-21 | Boxpark, Liverpool, England | |
| 11 | Loss | 10–1 | Terri Harper | UD | 10 | 2024-09-28 | Canon Medical Arena, Sheffield, England | Lost WBO female lightweight title |
| 10 | Win | 10–0 | Karen Elizabeth Carabajal | UD | 10 | 2024-04-13 | Manchester Arena, Manchester, England | Won vacant WBO female lightweight title |
| 9 | Win | 9–0 | Katharina Thanderz | UD | 10 | 2023-09-30 | Wembley Arena, London, England | Won vacant European female lightweight title |
| 8 | Win | 8–0 | Vicky Wilkinson | TKO | 6 (10), 1:06 | 2023-03-11 | Liverpool Arena, Liverpool, England | Won vacant Commonwealth female lightweight title |
| 7 | Win | 7–0 | Kristine Shergold | PTS | 8 | 2022-12-10 | Leeds Arena, Leeds, England | |
| 6 | Win | 6–0 | Edina Kiss | PTS | 6 | 2022-09-24 | Nottingham Arena, Nottingham, England | |
| 5 | Win | 5–0 | Mahjouba Oubtil | PTS | 6 | 2022-05-20 | Bilbao Arena, Bilbao, Spain | |
| 4 | Win | 4–0 | Vaida Masiokaite | PTS | 6 | 2021-12-18 | Manchester Arena, Manchester, England | |
| 3 | Win | 3–0 | Karina Szmalenberg | PTS | 4 | 2021-09-12 | De Vere Whites Hotel, Bolton, England | |
| 2 | Win | 2–0 | Bojana Libiszewska | PTS | 4 | 2019-12-07 | De Vere Whites Hotel, Bolton, England | |
| 1 | Win | 1–0 | Vaida Masiokaite | PTS | 4 | 2019-09-28 | De Vere Whites Hotel, Bolton, England | |

== See also ==
- List of female boxers
- List of southpaw stance boxers

Sporting positions
Regional boxing titles
| Vacant Title last held by Anisha Basheel | Commonwealth female lightweight champion 11 March 2023 – 13 April 2024; Won world title | Vacant |
| Vacant Title last held by Jelena Janićijević | European female lightweight champion 30 September 2023 – 13 April 2024; Won world title | Vacant |
World boxing titles
| Vacant Title last held by Katie Taylor | WBO female lightweight champion 13 April 2024 – 28 September 2024 | Succeeded by Terri Harper |
