= Elif Nur Turhan =

Turkish boxer (born 1995)

Personal information
- Born: 16 April 1995 (age 31) Istanbul, Turkey
- Weight: Super-featherweight; Lightweight; Light-welterweight

Boxing career
- Stance: Orthodox

Boxing record
- Total fights: 15
- Wins: 14
- Win by KO: 8
- Losses: 1

Elif Nur Turhan (born 16 April 1995) is a Turkish professional boxer. She is a former IBF female lightweight champion and has also held the WBA interim female super-featherweight and WBF female light-welterweight titles.

== Career ==
A professional since May 2022, Nur Turhan defeated Edith Soledad Matthysse via unanimous decision at City Square in Tetovo, North Macedonia, to claim the vacant WBF female light-welterweight title in her fifth pro-fight on 29 July 2023.

Returning to Tetovo for her next bout, she faced Kirsty Hill for the vacant WBC International female super-featherweight title at the city's Gymnasium Sport Hall on 28 November 2023, winning by unanimous decision.

Nur Turhan added the vacant WBA Gold female super-featherweight title to her collection with a unanimous decision victory over Lara Altamirano at Ostermann-Arena in Leverkusen, Germany, on 4 May 2024.

Switching to lightweight, she stopped Shauna Browne just 47 seconds into the first of their scheduled 10-round contest at the SSE Arena in Belfast, Northern Ireland, on 1 March 2025.

In April 2025, Nur Turhan signed a promotional contract with Eddie Hearn led Matchroom Boxing.

She challenged WBA interim female super-featherweight champion Rima Ayadi at the Salle du Casino in Enghien-les-Bains, France, on 28 August 2025, winning by stoppage in the sixth round.

Nur Turhan faced unbeaten IBF female lightweight champion Beatriz Ferreira at Salle des Étoiles in Monte Carlo on 6 December 2025. She knocked her opponent to the canvas in the first round and again in the fifth at which point the referee stopped the fight, handing her the win, and the title, via technical knockout.

She was named 2025 Women's Fighter of the Year by both BoxingScene and The Sporting News.

Having renewed her promotional contract with Matchroom, Nur Turhan made the first defense of her title against Taylah Gentzen at Newcastle Arena in England on 31 January 2026. She won by split decision with two of the ringside judges scoring the bout in her favour 98–92 and 96–94 respectively while the third had it 97–93 for her opponent.

Nur Turhan made the second defense of her title against the previously unbeaten Gabriela Tellez at Desert Diamond Arena in Glendale, Arizona, United States, on 13 June 2026. She won via unanimous decision.

In August 2026, Nur Turhan signed a promotional contract with Jake Paul-led Most Valuable Promotions. She made the next defense of her IBF female lightweight title against Alycia Baumgardner at College Park Center in Arlington, Texas, United States, on 8 November 2026. Nur Turhan lost by unanimous decision with all three ringside judges scoring the fight, which was contested over 10 three-minute rounds, 100–90 in favour of her opponent.

== Professional boxing record ==
15 fights	14 wins	1 loss
By knockout	8	0
By decision	6	1

No.	Result	Record	Opponent	Type	Round, time	Date	Location	Notes
15	Loss	14–1	Alycia Baumgardner	UD	10	8 Nov 2026	College Park Center, Arlington, Texas, U.S	Lost IBF female lightweight title
14	Win	14–0	Gabriela Tellez	UD	10	13 Jun 2026	Desert Diamond Arena, Glendale, Arizona, U.S	Retained IBF female lightweight title
13	Win	13–0	Taylah Gentzen	SD	10	31 Jan 2026	Newcastle Arena, Newcastle upon Tyne, England	Retained IBF female lightweight title
12	Win	12–0	Beatriz Ferreira	TKO	5 (10), 1:08	6 Dec 2025	Salle des Étoiles, Monte Carlo, Monaco	Won IBF female lightweight title
11	Win	11–0	Rima Ayadi	TKO	6 (10), 1:52	28 Aug 2025	Salle du Casino, Enghien-les-Bains, France	Won WBA female Interim super-featherweight title
10	Win	10–0	Shauna Browne	TKO	1 (10), 0:47	1 Mar 2025	SSE Arena, Belfast, Northern Ireland	
9	Win	9–0	Usanakorn Thawilsuhannawang	KO	1 (6), 1:24	27 Dec 2024	Marriott Hotel, Ankara, Turkey	
8	Win	8–0	Lara Altamirano	UD	10	4 May 2024	Ostermann-Arena, Leverkusen, Germany	Won vacant WBA Gold female super-featherweight title
7	Win	7–0	Yolis Marrugo Franco	KO	1 (8), 0:43	22 March 2024	Tirana Olympic Park, Tirana, Albania	
6	Win	6–0	Kirsty Hill	UD	10	28 Nov 2023	Gymnasium Sport Hall, Tetovo, North Macedonia	Won vacant WBC International female super-featherweight title
5	Win	5–0	Edith Soledad Matthysse	UD	10	23 Jul 2023	City Square, Tetovo, North Macedonia	Won vacant WBF female light-welterweight title
4	Win	4–0	Karina Szmalenberg	UD	6	27 Dec 2022	Palestra Karagac, Peja, Kosovo	
3	Win	3–0	Nikolett Szabó	KO	1 (6), 1:05	28 Nov 2022	Gymnasium Sport Hall, Tetovo, North Macedonia	
2	Win	2–0	Angela Cannizzaro	KO	1 (6), 1:54	30 Jul 2022	City Square, Tetovo, North Macedonia	
1	Win	1–0	Valmira Xhemollari	TKO	1 (4), 1:00	14 May 2022	Farie Hoti Sports Palace, Tirana, Albania	

== See also ==
- List of female boxers

Sporting positions
Regional boxing titles
Vacant Title last held by Bo Mi Re Shin	WBC International super-featherweight champion 28 November 2023 – 28 August 2025; Won interim title	Vacant
Vacant Title last held by Ramona Graeff	WBA Gold super-featherweight champion 4 May 2024 – 28 August 2025; Won interim title	Vacant
Minor world boxing titles
Vacant Title last held by Oshin Derieuw	WBF light-welterweight champion 29 July 2023 – 2024; Vacated	Vacant Title next held by Ikram Kerwat
Major world boxing titles
Vacant Title last held by Choi Hyun-mi	WBA super-featherweight champion Interim title 28 August 2025 – June 2026; Vacated	Vacant Title next held by Leila Beaudoin
Preceded by Beatriz Ferreira	IBF lightweight champion 6 December 2025 – 8 November 2026	Succeeded by Alycia Baumgardner
