= Kirsty Hill =

English boxer (born 1991)

Personal information
- Born: Kirsty Louise Hill; 19 August 1991 (age 34) York, Yorkshire, England
- Height: 177 cm (5 ft 10 in)
- Weight: Super-featherweight, Lightweight

Boxing career
- Stance: Orthodox

Boxing record
- Total fights: 11
- Wins: 7
- Win by KO: 0
- Losses: 4

Kirsty Hill (born 19 August 1991) is an English professional boxer. She is a former Commonwealth female super-featherweight champion.

== Career ==
After an amateur career fighting out of Cleethorpes Trinity Boxing Academy and which included winning the English female lightweight title in November 2019, Hill made her professional debut on 5 March 2022, with a points victory over Vaida Masiokaite in a six-round contest held at Newark Showground in Nottinghamshire.

Having amassed a record of four wins and one defeat, she took on Vicky Wilkinson for the vacant Commonwealth female super-featherweight title at The Hangar Events Venue in Wolverhampton on 15 September 2023, claiming the belt by unanimous decision.

Hill made an unsuccessful bid to add the vacant WBC female super-featherweight International title to her résumé when she lost by unanimous decision to Turkey's Elif Nur Turhan in a contest held in Tetovo, Macedonia on 28 November 2023.

She got back to winning ways in her next fight by retaining her Commonwealth title against former WBC female super-bantamweight champion Fatuma Zarika from Kenya at Winter Gardens in Blackpool on 11 May 2024, via split decision.

After more than a year away from the competitive boxing ring, and having vacated her title, Hill faced unbeaten Jade Pearce over six rounds at Newark Showground on 22 November 2025, losing on points. The pair fought a rematch, with the now vacant Commonwealth female super-featherweight title on the line, at Eston Leisure Centre in Middlesbrough on 20 June 2026. Hill lost via unanimous decision.

== Personal life ==
Away from the boxing ring, Hill works as a firefighter.

== Professional boxing record ==
11 fights	7 wins	4 losses
By decision	7	4

No.	Result	Record	Opponent	Type	Round, time	Date	Location	Notes
11	Loss	7–4	Jade Pearce	UD	10	20 Jun 2026	Eston Leisure Centre, Middlesbrough, England	For vacant Commonwealth female super-featherweight title
10	Loss	7–3	Jade Pearce	PTS	6	22 Nov 2025	Lady Eastwood Pavilion, Newark Showground, Newark, England	
9	Win	7–2	Fatuma Zarika	SD	10	11 May 2024	Winter Gardens, Blackpool, England	Retained Commonwealth female super-featherweight title
8	Loss	6–2	Elif Nur Turhan	UD	10	28 Nov 2023	Gymnasium Sport Hall, Tetovo, Macedonia	For vacant WBC female super-featherweight International title
7	Win	6–1	Angelika Oles	PTS	6	3 Nov 2023	Grimsby Auditorium, Grimsby, England	
6	Win	5–1	Vicky Wilkinson	UD	10	15 Sep 2023	The Hangar Events Venue, Wolverhampton, England	Won vacant Commonwealth female super-featherweight title
5	Win	4–1	Linzi Buczynskyj	PTS	6	17 Jun 2023	Grimsby Auditorium, Grimsby, England	
4	Loss	3–1	Elizabeth Oshoba	PTS	6	10 Mar 2023	York Hall, London, England	
3	Win	3–0	Beccy Ferguson	PTS	6	8 Oct 2022	Premier Banqueting Suite, Burmantofts, Leeds, England	
2	Win	2–0	Beccy Ferguson	PTS	6	1 Oct 2022	King's Hall, Stoke-on-Trent, England	
1	Win	1–0	Vaida Masiokaite	PTS	6	5 Mar 2022	Lady Eastwood Pavilion, Newark Showground, Newark, England	
