= Duchemin =

Duchemin is a French surname meaning "of the path". Notable people with the surname include:

- Catherine Duchemin (1630—1698), French painter
- Theresa Maxis Duchemin (1810—1892), pioneering Black religious sister
- Emmanuel Duchemin (born 1979), French footballer
- Angélique Duchemin (1991-2017), boxer
