= Terri Harper =

British boxer (born 1996)

Personal information
- Nickname: Belter
- Born: Terri Leigh Harper; 2 November 1996 (age 29) Denaby Main, England
- Height: 5 ft 8 1/2 in (174 cm)
- Weight: Super-featherweight; Lightweight; Welterweight; Light-middleweight; Super-lightweight; }

Boxing career
- Reach: 65 in (165 cm)
- Stance: Orthodox

Boxing record
- Total fights: 22
- Wins: 17
- Win by KO: 7
- Losses: 3
- Draws: 2

Terri Harper (born 2 November 1996) is a British professional boxer. She has held world championships in three weight classes, the World Boxing Organization (WBO) female lightweight title from 2024 to 2026, the World Boxing Council (WBC) female super-featherweight title from 2020 to 2021, and the World Boxing Association (WBA) and International Boxing Organization (IBO) female light-middleweight titles from 2022 to 2024. She became the second British woman after Nicola Adams to win a major world championship.

== Early life ==
Born on 2 November 1996 in Denaby Main, Harper was raised in Yorkshire with her two brothers and sister. She got into boxing at the age of 12 after watching Jack Osbourne box on the TV show Jack Osbourne: Adrenaline Junkie. After winning a silver medal as an amateur at the 2012 European Junior Championships, Harper stepped away from the sport to concentrate on her education. She returned to amateur boxing after completing her GCSEs, only to become disillusioned with the sport after losing her first two bouts. While deciding whether or not to continue with boxing, Harper received a call from a boxing promoter with an offer to turn over to the professional side of the sport. She subsequently accepted the offer, and stated that she has "never looked back since".

== Amateur career ==
As an amateur, Harper only competed 17 times, which saw her win three national titles and a silver medal at the European Junior Championships in Poland.

== Professional career ==
=== Early career ===
Harper made her professional debut on 25 November 2017, at the Doncaster Dome in Doncaster, scoring a four-round points decision (PTS) victory over Monika Antonik.

After four more fights in 2018—PTS wins over Borislava Goranova in February and Bojana Libiszewska in April, and stoppage wins over Bec Connolly in October and Feriche Mashauri in December—she faced undefeated Commonwealth super-lightweight champion Nina Bradley on 8 March 2019, at the Barnsley Metrodome in Barnsley, with the vacant WBC International female lightweight title on the line. In a fight which saw Bradley down twice in the first two rounds, Harper won via technical knockout (TKO) in the tenth and final round. At the time of the stoppage all three judges had Harper winning on the scorecards with 90–79, 89–80, and 89–80.

==== Harper vs. Bell, Obenauf ====
Following a stoppage win against Claudia Lopez in May, Harper faced former world title challenger Nozipho Bell on 19 July for the vacant IBO female super-featherweight title at the Magna Centre in Rotherham. Harper dropped her opponent twice in the eighth round before referee Howard Foster called a halt to the contest, handing Harper her first world title via eighth-round TKO.

It was announced in September 2019 that Harper had signed a promotional contract with Eddie Hearn's Matchroom Boxing, with her first fight under the new promotion to take place on 2 November against former two-time world title challenger Viviane Obenauf at the Manchester Arena. The fight was televised live on Sky Sports as part of the undercard of Katie Taylor's world title bout against Christina Linardatou. Harper successfully retained her IBO title via unanimous decision (UD) over ten rounds, with the judges' scorecards reading 99–91, 99–92, and 97–93. In the post-fight interview, Hearn announced that terms had been agreed for Harper to challenge reigning champion Eva Wahlström for the WBC female super-featherweight title in early 2020.

==== Harper vs. Wahlström ====
On 20 December it was announced that Harper would challenge Wahlström on 8 February 2020, at the FlyDSA Arena (formerly Sheffield Arena), with Harper's IBO and Wahlström's WBC titles on the line. The fight was aired live on Sky Sports in the UK and DAZN in the US as part of the undercard for Kell Brook vs. Mark DeLuca. Harper knocked Wahlström down in round seven en-route to a UD victory, adding the WBC to her IBO title to become the second British female boxer, after Nicola Adams, to capture a major world title. Two judges scored the bout 99–90 and the third judge scored it 98–91.

==== Harper vs. Jonas ====
She defended her titles against former Olympian Natasha Jonas on 7 August 2020, at the Matchroom Sport headquarters in Brentwood, Essex. After a closely contested fight which saw Jonas suffer a cut above her right eye in the early rounds before staggering Harper in the eighth, the result went to the judges' scorecards; one judge scored the bout 96–94 in favour of Harper, the second judge scored it 96–95 to Jonas, while the third judge scored it even at 95–95, resulting in a split draw to see Harper retain her titles. The bout was the first time two British women contested a world title.

==== Harper vs. Thanderz ====
In the second defence of her WBC title and fourth of her IBO, Harper faced former European female super-featherweight champion Katharina Thanderz on 14 November 2020. The bout served as part of the undercard for Katie Taylor's world title defence against Miriam Gutiérrez at The SSE Arena in London. Thanderz suffered an injury to her nose after an accidental clash of heads in the ninth round before being hurt with a punch to the body, causing her to bend over in pain. Harper followed up with a sustained assault, landing combinations to the head and body, prompting referee Victor Loughlin to call a halt to the contest to award Harper a ninth-round TKO victory.

==== Harper vs. Choi ====
In April 2021, it was announced that Harper would face WBA female super-featherweight champion Hyun Mi Choi on 15 May, at the AO Arena (formerly known as Manchester Arena). The bout was to be televised live on Sky Sports in the UK and streamed live on DAZN in the US and more than 200 countries and territories. In early May, Harper was forced to withdraw from the bout after suffering a hand injury during sparring.

==== Harper vs. Ryan ====
On 23 March 2024 in Sheffield, England, Harper challenged Sandy Ryan for her WBO welterweight title, but lost the fight via fourth-round RTD.

=== WBO lightweight champion ===
==== Harper vs. Dixon ====
Harper was due to challenge WBO female World lightweight champion Rhiannon Dixon at Manchester's Co-op Live Arena on 24 August 2024, but the fight was moved to take place on 28 September 2024 at Sheffield Arena after an injury to Jack Catterall who had been scheduled to headline the original bill. The venue was later changed again to the Copper Box Arena in London but the date was unaltered after the Sheffield show was cancelled. On 6 September 2024 it was announced that the Fisher vs. Rudenko event in London was cancelled, and the bout between Harper and Dixon was moved to Canon Medical Arena in Sheffield, England as the main event on 28 September 2024. Harper won the fight by unanimous decision to become a three-weight world champion and inflict the first loss of Dixon's professional career.

==== Harper vs. Zimmermann ====
Harper made the first defense of her WBO lightweight title against Natalie Zimmermann at the Eco-Power Stadium in Doncaster, England on 23 May 2025. She won by unanimous decision.

=== Signing with Most Valuable Promotions ===
Harper signed with Jake Paul's Most Valuable Promotions in July 2025.

==== Harper vs. Dubois ====
Holding the WBO lightweight title, Harper faced WBC champion Caroline Dubois in a unification fight at Olympia in London on 5 April 2026. She lost by unanimous decision.

==== Harper vs. Reyes ====
Switching up in weight divisions, Harper faced Miranda Reyes in an eight-round super-lightweight bout at bp pulse LIVE in Birmingham on 29 August 2026. She knocked her opponent to the canvas twice in the second round causing the referee to step in to halt the fight and award Harper the win via technical knockout.

== Professional boxing record ==
22 fights	17 wins	3 losses
By knockout	7	2
By decision	10	1
Draws	2	

No.	Result	Record	Opponent	Type	Round, time	Date	Location	Notes
22	Win	17–3–2	Miranda Reyes	TKO	2 (8), 0:47	29 Aug 2026	bp pulse LIVE, Birmingham, England, England	
21	Loss	16–3–2	Caroline Dubois	UD	10	5 Apr 2026	Olympia, London, England	Lost WBO female lightweight title; For WBO & vacant The Ring female lightweight titles
20	Win	16–2–2	Natalie Zimmermann	UD	10	23 May 2025	Eco-Power Stadium, Doncaster, England	Retained WBO female lightweight title
19	Win	15–2–2	Rhiannon Dixon	UD	10	28 Sep 2024	Canon Medical Arena, Sheffield, England	Won WBO female lightweight title
18	Loss	14–2–2	Sandy Ryan	RTD	4 (10), 2:00	23 Mar 2024	Sheffield Arena, Sheffield, England	For WBO welterweight title
17	Draw	14–1–2	Cecilia Brækhus	MD	10	7 Oct 2023	Sheffield Arena, Sheffield, England	Retained WBA light-middleweight title; For WBO light-middleweight title
16	Win	14–1–1	Ivana Habazin	UD	10	27 May 2023	Manchester Arena, Manchester, England	Retained WBA light-middleweight title
15	Win	13–1–1	Hannah Rankin	UD	10	24 Sep 2022	Nottingham Arena, Nottingham, England	Won WBA and IBO light-middleweight titles
14	Win	12–1–1	Yamila Belen Abellaneda	UD	10	12 Mar 2022	Nottingham Arena, Nottingham, England	Won WBA Inter-Continental lightweight title
13	Loss	11–1–1	Alycia Baumgardner	TKO	4 (10), 0:23	13 Nov 2021	Utilta Arena, Sheffield, England	Lost WBC and IBO super-featherweight titles
12	Win	11–0–1	Katharina Thanderz	TKO	9 (10), 1:12	14 Nov 2020	The SSE Arena, London, England	Retained WBC and IBO super-featherweight titles
11	Draw	10–0–1	Natasha Jonas	SD	10	7 Aug 2020	Matchroom Fight Camp, Brentwood, England	Retained WBC and IBO super-featherweight titles
10	Win	10–0	Eva Wahlström	UD	10	8 Feb 2020	FlyDSA Arena, Sheffield, England	Retained IBO super-featherweight title; Won WBC super-featherweight title
9	Win	9–0	Viviane Obenauf	UD	10	2 Nov 2019	Manchester Arena, Manchester, England	Retained IBO super-featherweight title
8	Win	8–0	Nozipho Bell	TKO	8 (10), 1:25	19 Jul 2019	Magna Centre, Rotherham, England	Won vacant IBO super-featherweight title
7	Win	7–0	Claudia Andrea Lopez	TKO	6 (10), 1:58	10 May 2019	Nottingham Arena, Nottingham, England	Retained WBC International lightweight title
6	Win	6–0	Nina Bradley	TKO	10 (10), 0:13	8 Mar 2019	Barnsley Metrodome, Barnsley, England	Won vacant WBC International lightweight title
5	Win	5–0	Feriche Mashauri	TKO	2 (6), 1:25	8 Dec 2018	Sheffield Arena, Sheffield, England	
4	Win	4–0	Bec Connolly	KO	3 (6), 1:40	5 Oct 2018	Barnsley Metrodome, Barnsley, England	
3	Win	3–0	Bojana Libiszewska	PTS	4	13 Apr 2018	Doncaster Dome, Doncaster, England	
2	Win	2–0	Borislava Gorinova	PTS	4	10 Feb 2018	Dearne Valley Leisure Centre, Denaby Main, England	
1	Win	1–0	Monika Antonik	PTS	4	25 Nov 2017	Doncaster Dome, Doncaster, England	

== Personal life ==
Harper came out as gay to her father and step mother at the age of 14.

== See also ==
- List of female boxers
- List of boxing triple champions

Sporting positions
Regional boxing titles
Vacant Title last held by Katharina Thanderz	WBC International lightweight champion 8 March 2019 – 8 February 2020; Won world title	Vacant Title next held by Chelsey Anderson
Minor world boxing titles
Vacant Title last held by Firuza Sharipova	IBO super-featherweight champion 19 July 2019 – 13 November 2021	Succeeded by Alycia Baumgardner
Preceded by Hannah Rankin	IBO light-middleweight champion 24 September 2022 – 2022; Vacated	Vacant Title next held by Femke Hermans
Major world boxing titles
Preceded by Eva Wahlström	WBC super-featherweight champion 8 February 2020 – 13 November 2021	Succeeded by Alycia Baumgardner
Preceded by Hannah Rankin	WBA light-middleweight champion 24 September 2022 – September 2024; Vacated	Vacant
Preceded by Rhiannon Dixon	WBO lightweight champion 28 September 2024 – 5 April 2026	Succeeded by Caroline Dubois
