= Nina Bradley =

Nina Bradley may refer to:

- Nina Leopold Bradley (1917–2011), American conservationist, researcher and writer
- Nina Bradley (boxer) (born 1987), British boxer
