= Katharina Thanderz =

Norwegian boxer (born 1988)

Personal information
- Nickname: Katy
- Nationality: Norwegian
- Born: 29 July 1988 (age 38) Oslo, Norway
- Height: 171 cm (5 ft 7 in)
- Weight: Super-featherweight; Lightweight

Boxing career
- Reach: 172 cm (68 in)
- Stance: Orthodox

Boxing record
- Total fights: 18
- Wins: 16
- Win by KO: 2
- Losses: 2

Katharina Thanderz (born 29 July 1988) is a Norwegian professional boxer who has held the WBC interim female super-featherweight World title and the European female super-featherweight title.

== Professional career ==
Thanderz began her professional sporting career as a kickboxer, a sport she began at the age of ten. After 18 years in the sport, she made her professional boxing debut on 27 May 2016, scoring a four-round unanimous decision (UD) victory over Angela Cannizzaro at the Polideportivo Jose Caballero in Alcobendas, Spain.

In her first fight in her native Norway, she defeated Maria Semertzoglou for the vacant European super-featherweight title on 21 October 2017.

On 10 March 2018, Thanderz defeated unbeaten Icelandic boxer Valgerdur Gudsteinsdottir by unanimous decision at X Meeting Point in Oslo to win the vacant WBC female lightweight International title.

Thanderz claimed the vacant interim WBC female super-featherweight title with a split decision win over Danila Ramos at Ekeberg Hall in Oslo on 16 December 2019.

In her next fight she challenged WBC and IBO female super-featherweight champion Terri Harper on 14 November 2020, suffering a ninth-round stoppage defeat at Wembley Arena in London, England.

After moving back up in weight divisions and securing three points wins, Thanderz returned to Wembley Arena to face Rhiannon Dixon for the vacant European lightweight title on September 30, 2023. She lost by unanimous decision with all three judges giving the fight to the English boxer by 100–90.

== Personal life ==
Thanderz was born to a Norwegian mother and a Spanish father in Oslo, Norway, where she spent the first seven years of her life. She moved with her family to Altea, Spain, where she still lives and trains.

== Professional boxing record ==
18 fights	16 wins	2 losses
By knockout	2	1
By decision	14	1

No.	Result	Record	Opponent	Type	Round, time	Date	Location	Notes
18	Loss	16–2	(United Kingdom) Rhiannon Dixon	UD	10	30 September 2023	(United Kingdom) Wembley Arena, London, England	For the vacant European female lightweight title
17	Win	16–1	(Romania) Ioana Fecioru	PTS	8	24 March 2023	(United Kingdom) Bolton Whites Hotel, Bolton, England	
16	Win	15–1	(Hungary) Edina Kiss	PTS	8	2 December 2022	(United Kingdom) Newcastle Arena, Newcastle, England	
15	Win	14–1	(Czech Republic) Tereza Dvorakova	PTS	6	13 May 2022	(United Kingdom) Indigo at The O2, Greenwich, England	
14	Loss	13–1	(United Kingdom) Terri Harper	TKO	9 (10), 1:12	14 Nov 2020	(United Kingdom) The SSE Arena, London, England	For WBC and IBO female super-featherweight titles
13	Win	13–0	(Brazil) Danila Ramos	SD	10	16 Nov 2019	Ekeberghallen, Oslo, Norway	Won vacant WBC interim female super-featherweight title
12	Win	12–0	(Italy) Monica Gentili	UD	8	17 Aug 2019	Friedrich-Ebert-Halle, Ludwigshafen, Germany	
11	Win	11–0	(United Kingdom) Rachel Ball	MD	8	2 Mar 2019	Sør Amfi, Arendal, Norway	
10	Win	10–0	(Argentina) Tamara Nunez	SD	8	29 Jun 2018	Pabellon Camila Cano, La Nucia, Spain	
9	Win	9–0	(Poland) Bojana Libiszewska	UD	6	19 May 2018	Pabellon Esperanza Lag, Elche, Spain	
8	Win	8–0	(Iceland) Valgerdur Gudstensdottir	UD	8	10 Mar 2018	X Meeting Point, Oslo, Norway	Won vacant WBC International female lightweight title
7	Win	7–0	(Greece) Maria Semertzoglou	UD	10	21 Oct 2017	Skien Fritidspark, Skien, Norway	Won vacant European super-featherweight title
6	Win	6–0	(Poland) Karina Kopinska	UD	6	14 Jul 2017	Palacio de los Deportes, Benidorm, Spain	
5	Win	5–0	(Romania) Mirabela Calugareanu	TKO	2 (4), 1:04	26 May 2017	Pabellon Municipal, Sedaví, Spain	
4	Win	4–0	(Romania) Mirabela Calugareanu	TKO	2 (6), 2:59	18 Feb 2017	Polideportivo Margarita Ramos, León, Spain	
3	Win	3–0	(Spain) Azahara Sanchez	PTS	4	26 Nov 2016	Pabellón Raúl Mesa, Benidorm, Spain	
2	Win	2–0	(Spain) Jessica Sanchez	PTS	4	23 Jul 2016	Palacio de los Deportes, Benidorm, Spain	
1	Win	1–0	(Italy) Angela Cannizzaro	UD	4	27 May 2016	Polideportivo Jose Caballero, Alcobendas, Spain	

Sporting positions
Regional boxing titles
Vacant Title last held by Angélique Duchemin	European female super-featherweight champion 21 October 2017 – February 2018	Vacant Title next held by Elhem Mekhaled
Vacant Title last held by Ikram Kerwat	WBC International female super-featherweight champion 10 March 2018 – March 2019	Vacant Title next held by Terri Harper
World boxing titles
Vacant Title last held by Elhem Mekhaled	WBC female super-featherweight champion Interim title 16 November 2019 – 14 November 2020; Fought for full title	Vacant
