= Nina Bradley (boxer) =

British boxer (born 1987)

Personal information
- Nickname: Boom Boom
- Nationality: British
- Born: 20 October 1987 (age 38) Boston, Lincolnshire, England
- Height: 5 ft 6 in (168 cm)
- Weight: Lightweight; Light-welterweight; Welterweight

Boxing career
- Stance: Orthodox

Boxing record
- Total fights: 8
- Wins: 7
- Win by KO: 0
- Losses: 1

Nina Bradley (born 20 October 1987) is a British professional boxer who is a former Commonwealth female super-lightweight champion.

== Professional career ==
Bradley made her professional debut on 20 May 2017 at the Newark Showground in Newark, Nottinghamshire, scoring a four round points decision victory over Monika Antonik.

After winning her first five fights, she faced Feriche Mashauri for the vacant Commonwealth female super-lightweight title on 15 September 2018 at the King Power Stadium in Leicester. Bradley won via unanimous decision with two judges scoring the bout 99–92, and the third scoring it 97–93.

Two fights later she fought Terri Harper on 8 March 2019 for the vacant WBC International female lightweight title at the Barnsley Metrodome, Barnsley. Bradley lost the fight, and her unbeaten record, by technical knockout in the final round. At the time of the stoppage, all three judges had Harper winning on the scorecards (89–80, 89–80, 90–79).

== Professional boxing record ==
9 fights	9 wins	0 losses
By knockout	5	0
By decision	4	0

No.	Result	Record	Opponent	Type	Round, time	Date	Location	Notes
8	Loss	7–1	(United Kingdom) Terri Harper	TKO	10 (10)	8 Mar 2019	(United Kingdom) Barnsley Metrodome, Barnsley, England	For vacant WBC International female lightweight title
7	Win	7–0	(Poland) Karina Kopinska	UD	6	25 Nov 2018	(United Kingdom) Newark Showground, Newark, England	
6	Win	6–0	(Tanzania) Feriche Mashauri	UD	10	15 Sep 2018	(United Kingdom) King Power Stadium, Leicester, England	Won vacant Commonwealth female super-lightweight title
5	Win	5–0	(Bulgaria) Borislava Goranova	PTS	6	14 Apr 2018	(United Kingdom) King Power Stadium, Leicester, England	
4	Win	4–0	(Bosnia and Herzegovina) Katarina Vistica	PTS	6	2 Mar 2018	(United Kingdom) King Power Stadium, Leicester, England	
3	Win	3–0	(Bulgaria) Borislava Goranova	PTS	6	13 Dec 2017	(United Kingdom) DoubleTree by Hilton Hotel, Sheffield, England	
2	Win	2–0	(Hungary) Klaudia Vigh	PTS	4	24 Sep 2017	(United Kingdom) Newark Showground, Newark, England	
1	Win	1–0	(Poland) Monika Antonik	PTS	4	20 Mar 2017	(United Kingdom) Newark Showground, Newark, England	
