= Ornella Domini =

Swiss boxer

Personal information
- Nationality: Swiss
- Born: 2 November 1988 (age 37)
- Weight: Welterweight; Light-middleweight

Boxing career

Boxing record
- Total fights: 17
- Wins: 15
- Win by KO: 3
- Losses: 2

Ornella Domini (born 2 November 1988) is a Swiss professional boxer who is a two-time European female welterweight champion. She also challenged for the WBC female super-welterweight title.

== Professional career ==
Domini made her professional debut on 26 January 2013, scoring a third-round technical knockout (TKO) victory against Daniela Bickei at the Hotel Ramada in Geneva, Switzerland.

Following four more wins, one by TKO, she defeated the European female super-lightweight champion Sabrina Giuliani—who had moved up a weight class to face Domini—via ten-round split decision (SD), capturing the inaugural European female welterweight title on 9 November 2013 at the Hotel Ramada. The two ringside judges scored the bout 96–95 in favour of Domini while the referee scored it 97–94 to Giuliani. After two unanimous decision (UD) victories in non-title bouts in 2014—Kremena Petkova in March and Borislava Goranova in May—Domini defeated Giuliani in a rematch on 28 March 2015, retaining her European title via ten-round UD at the Hotel Ramada with the scorecards reading 100–91, 97–93, and 97–93.

Domini was scheduled to face undisputed female welterweight champion Cecilia Brækhus on 28 November 2015 at the ESPRIT Arena in Düsseldorf, Germany, with Brækhus' WBA, WBC, IBF, and WBO titles on the line. The bout was set to serve on the undercard of Wladimir Klitschko vs. Tyson Fury. However, the bout was called off after Brækhus suffered an injury. Following another postponement of a bout with Brækhus, coupled with commitments outside of boxing, Domini made the decision to retire from the sport.

After two years out of the ring, she made her return on 1 April 2017, defeating Lela Terashvili via six-round UD at the Hotel Ramada. Two months later Domini suffered the first defeat of her career, losing by UD over six rounds against Ruth Chisale on 24 June. She bounced back from defeat with a third round stoppage via corner retirement (RTD) against former opponent Lela Terashvili in November, followed by two UD victories against Mariam Tatunashvili in March and September 2018.

Her next fight came against WBC female super-welterweight champion Ewa Piątkowska on 10 November 2018 at the Gliwice Arena in Gliwice, Poland. In what was described as a dominant performance from the champion, Domini suffered her second professional defeat, losing by UD with the judges' scorecards reading 100–90, 99–91, and 98–92.

Following the loss, she recaptured the vacant European female welterweight title, defeating Szilvia Szabados via ten-round UD on 9 March 2019 at the Hotel Ramada with the scorecards reading 99–91, 98–93, and 97–94. The pair had a rematch one year later on 7 March at the same venue, with Domini retaining her title with a SD victory.

== Professional boxing record ==
17 fights	15 wins	2 losses
By knockout	3	0
By decision	12	2

No.	Result	Record	Opponent	Type	Round, time	Date	Location	Notes
17	Win	15–2	(Hungary) Szilvia Szabados	SD	10	7 Mar 2020	Hotel Ramada, Geneva, Switzerland	Retained European female welterweight title
16	Win	14–2	(Hungary) Szilvia Szabados	UD	10	9 Mar 2019	Hotel Ramada, Geneva, Switzerland	Won vacant European female welterweight title
15	Loss	13–2	(Poland) Ewa Piątkowska	UD	10	10 Nov 2018	Gliwice Arena, Gliwice, Poland	For WBC female super-welterweight title
14	Win	13–1	(Georgia (country)) Mariam Tatunashvili	UD	8	29 Sep 2018	Hotel Ramada, Geneva, Switzerland	
13	Win	12–1	(Georgia (country)) Mariam Tatunashvili	UD	8	10 Mar 2018	Hotel Ramada, Geneva, Switzerland	
12	Win	11–1	(Georgia (country)) Lela Terashvili	RTD	3 (8), 1:55	4 Nov 2017	Hotel Ramada, Geneva, Switzerland	
11	Loss	10–1	(Malawi) Ruth Chisale	UD	6	24 Jun 2017	Salle de Fetes, Vernier, Switzerland	
10	Win	10–0	(Georgia (country)) Lela Terashvili	UD	6	1 Apr 2017	Hotel Ramada, Geneva, Switzerland	
9	Win	9–0	(Belgium) Sabrina Giuliani	UD	10	28 Mar 2015	Hotel Ramada, Geneva, Switzerland	Retained European female welterweight title
8	Win	8–0	(Bulgaria) Borislava Goranova	UD	6	17 May 2014	Salle Communale, Versoix, Switzerland	
7	Win	7–0	(Bulgaria) Kremena Petkova	UD	6	29 Mar 2014	Salle Communale, Nyon, Switzerland	
6	Win	6–0	(Belgium) Sabrina Giuliani	SD	10	9 Nov 2013	Hotel Ramada, Geneva, Switzerland	Won inaugural European female welterweight title
5	Win	5–0	(Bosnia and Herzegovina) Maja Jahic	UD	6	29 Jun 2013	Salle de Fetes, Vernier, Switzerland	
4	Win	4–0	(Bosnia and Herzegovina) Sanja Ostojic	UD	6	25 May 2013	Sporthalle Badbetrieb, Bad Ragaz, Switzerland	
3	Win	3–0	(Bosnia and Herzegovina) Maja Jahic	PTS	6	29 Mar 2013	Sports Palace, Cazin, Bosnia and Herzegovina	
2	Win	2–0	(Bosnia and Herzegovina) Masa Bacanov	TKO	3 (6), 1:55	9 Mar 2013	Salle Communale, Nyon, Switzerland	
1	Win	1–0	(Serbia) Daniela Bickei	TKO	3 (6), 1:30	26 Jan 2013	Hotel Ramada, Geneva, Switzerland	

Sporting positions
Regional boxing titles
Inaugural champion	European female welterweight champion 9 November 2013 – October 2015	Vacant Title next held by Ewa Piątkowska
Vacant Title last held by Ewa Piątkowska	European female welterweight champion 9 March 2019 – present	Incumbent
