= Elhem Mekhaled =

French boxer (born 1991)

Personal information
- Nickname: The Diamond
- Nationality: French
- Born: 7 February 1991 (age 35) Vaulx-en-Velin, Auvergne-Rhône-Alpes, France
- Weight: Super-featherweight, Super-lightweight

Boxing career
- Stance: Orthodox

Boxing record
- Total fights: 21
- Wins: 17
- Win by KO: 3
- Losses: 4

Elhem Mekhaled (born 7 February 1991) is a French professional boxer. She has held the European female super-featherweight title since 2018 and also held the WBC interim female super-featherweight title in 2019.

== Professional career ==
Mekhaled made her professional debut on 12 November 2016, scoring a four-round points decision (PTS) victory against Jacinthe Berenguer at the Palais des Sports René-Bougnol in Montpellier, France.

She began 2017 with two PTS victories—Valentina Keri in January and Bilitis Gaucher in February—before defeating Wendy Vincent via fourth-round technical knockout (TKO) for the vacant French female super-featherweight title on 17 March at the Salle La Cotonne in Saint-Étienne, France.

After six more wins, including two defences of her French title, Mekhaled defeated Marina Sakharov via ninth-round TKO, capturing the vacant European female super-featherweight title on 22 December 2018 at the Palais des Sports Jean Capievic in her home town of Vaulx-en-Velin.

In her next fight she faced Danila Ramos for the vacant WBC interim female super-featherweight title on 16 March 2019 at the W Hotel in Barcelona, Spain. Mekhaled captured her first world title, albeit an interim version, via ten-round unanimous decision (UD). Two judges scored the bout 97–93 and the third scored it 96–94.

On 8 September 2020, it was announced that Mekhaled had signed a managerial contract with MTK Global.

== Professional boxing record ==
21 fights	17 wins	4 losses
By knockout	3	1
By decision	13	3
By disqualification	1	0

No.	Result	Record	Opponent	Type	Round, time	Date	Location	Notes
21	Loss	17-4	(Canada) Leila Beaudoin	TKO	6 (10)	27 Jun 2025	Centre Videotron, Quebec City, Canada	For WBO International female super-featherweight title
20	Loss	17-3	(England) Chantelle Cameron	MD	10	20 Jul 2024	Resorts World Arena, Birmingham, England	For vacant WBC interim female super-lightweight title
19	Win	17-2	(Spain) Eva Cantos	UD	8	31 May 2024	Palais des Sports de Gerland, Lyon, France	
18	Win	16-2	(Russia) Yuliya Kutsenko	UD	8	28 May 2023	Palais des Sports Robert Oubron, Paris, France	
17	Loss	15-2	(United States) Alycia Baumgardner	UD	10	4 Feb 2023	(United States) Hulu Theater, New York City, New York, U.S.	
16	Loss	15-1	(Belgium) Delfine Persoon	UD	10	21 May 2022	Etihad Arena, Abu Dhabi	For vacant WBC Silver female super featherweight title
15	Win	15-0	(Bosnia and Herzegovina) Pasa Malagic	KO	1 (10)	18 Sep 2021	Salle COSEC, Lyon, France	
14	Win	14–0	(Poland) Karina Kopinska	UD	6	28 Dec 2019	Palais des Sports, Marseille, France	
13	Win	13–0	(Hungary) Gabriella Mezei	DQ	6	15 Nov 2019	AccorHotels Arena, Paris, France	
12	Win	12–0	(Brazil) Danila Ramos	UD	10	16 Mar 2019	W Hotel, Barcelona, Spain	Won vacant WBC interim female super-featherweight title
11	Win	11–0	(France) Marina Sakharov	TKO	9 (10)	22 Dec 2018	Palais des Sports Jean Capievic, Vaulx-en-Velin, France	Won vacant European female super-featherweight title
10	Win	10–0	(France) Elise Bussiere	PTS	6	9 Jul 2018	Salle Jean Jacques Rousseau, Vaulx-en-Velin, France	
9	Win	9–0	(Poland) Karina Kopinska	PTS	6	28 Apr 2018	Art Rotana Hotel, Manama, Bahrain	
8	Win	8–0	(Serbia) Nina Pavlovic	PTS	6	31 Mar 2018	Salle Jean Jacques Rousseau, Vaulx-en-Velin, France	
7	Win	7–0	(France) Marion Montanari	UD	8	10 Feb 2018	Palais des Sports de Beaublanc, Limoges, France	Retained French female super-featherweight title
6	Win	6–0	(France) Cindy Dehoux	UD	8	12 Oct 2017	Sud de France Arena, Montpellier, France	Retained French female super-featherweight title
5	Win	5–0	(France) Pauline Leconte	PTS	6	8 Apr 2017	Gymnase Massot, Le Puy-en-Velay, France	
4	Win	4–0	(France) Wendy Vincent	TKO	4 (8)	17 Mar 2017	Salle La Cotonne, Saint-Étienne, France	Won vacant French female super-featherweight title
3	Win	3–0	(France) Bilitis Gaucher	PTS	6	17 Feb 2017	Gabriel Rouchon, L'Étrat, France	
2	Win	2–0	(Serbia) Valentina Keri	PTS	4	14 Jan 2017	COSEC Champ Fleuri, Bourgoin-Jallieu, France	
1	Win	1–0	(France) Jacinthe Berenguer	PTS	4	12 Nov 2016	Palais des Sports René-Bougnol, Montpellier, France	

Sporting positions
Regional boxing titles
Vacant Title last held by Ségolène Lefebvre	French female super-featherweight champion 17 March 2017 – November 2018	Vacant Title next held by Cindy Dehoux
Vacant Title last held by Katharina Thanderz	European super-featherweight champion 22 December 2018 – present	Incumbent
World boxing titles
Vacant Title last held by Myriam Chomaz	WBC female super-featherweight champion Interim title 16 March 2019 – October 2019	Vacant Title next held by Katharina Thanderz
