= Pamela Noutcho Sawa =

Cameroonian-Italian boxer

Personal information
- Nationality: Italian
- Born: Pamela Malvina Noucho Sawa; 1992/1993 Bafia, Cameroon
- Height: 5 ft 7 in (170 cm)
- Weight: Lightweight

Boxing career
- Stance: Orthodox

Boxing record
- Total fights: 11
- Wins: 11
- Win by KO: 3

Pamela Noutcho Sawa (born 1992/1993) is a Cameroon-born Italian professional boxer. She has held the IBO female lightweight title since November 2025. Sawa is also a former European and Italian female lightweight champion.

== Personal life ==
Born in Bafia, Cameroon, Sawa moved to Italy aged eight. She gained Italian citizenship in 2022 and away from the boxing ring works as a nurse.

== Career ==
Having won the Italian amateur female 64 kg championship in 2020, Sawa claimed the vacant national professional female lightweight title with a unanimous decision success over Nadia Flalhi at PalaCasoria in Casoria on 8 September 2023.

Unbeaten in her first seven pro-fights, she defeated Nina Pavlovic via unanimous decision at Unipol Arena in Casalecchio di Reno on 25 October 2024 to win the vacant European female lightweight title. The contest was held behind closed doors without a crowd due to severe flooding in the area around the venue.

Sawa successfully defended her title by stopping Martina Righi in the first round at Palasport Arena Giuseppe Bondi in Ferrara on 11 April 2025.

She faced Karen Elizabeth Carabajal for the vacant IBO female lightweight title at PalaDozza in Bologna on 7 November 2025. Sawa was knocked to the canvas in the seventh round but recovered to finish the fight and won by split decision with two of the ringside judges favouring her 97–92 and 95–94 respectively, while the third scored the bout 95–94 for her opponent.

== Professional boxing record ==
11 fights	11 wins	0 losses
By knockout	3	0
By decision	8	0

No.	Result	Record	Opponent	Type	Round, time	Date	Location	Notes
11	Win	11–0	Mahjouba Oubtil	KO	1 (8), 1:13	4 Jul 2026	Palasport V.le Tiziano, Rome, Lazio, Italy	
10	Win	10–0	Karen Elizabeth Carabajal	SD	10	7 Nov 2025	PalaDozza, Bologna, Emilia-Romagna, Italy	Won vacant IBO female lightweight title
9	Win	9–0	Martina Righi	TKO	1 (10), 1:58	11 Apr 2025	Palasport Arena Giuseppe Bondi, Ferrara, Emilia-Romagna, Italy	Retained European female lightweight title
8	Win	8–0	Nina Pavlovic	UD	10	25 Oct 2024	Unipol Arena, Casalecchio di Reno, Campania, Italy	Won vacant European female lightweight title
7	Win	7–0	Jordan Barker Porter	UD	10	5 Apr 2024	PalaDozza, Casoria, Campania, Italy	
6	Win	6–0	Nadia Flalhi	UD	10	8 Sep 2023	Bologna, Emilia-Romagna, Italy	Won vacant Italian female lightweight title
5	Win	5–0	Ksenija Medic	PTS	6	10 Jun 2023	Palasport, Maclodio, Lombardy, Italy	
4	Win	4–0	Dunja Bocan	TKO	1 (6)	17 Feb 2023	Palasport, Massa, Tuscany, Italy	
3	Win	3–0	Aleksandra Vujovic	PTS	6	26 Dec 2022	Bologna, Emilia-Romagna, Italy	
2	Win	2–0	Alessia Vitanza	PTS	6	24 Jun 2022	Bologna, Emilia-Romagna, Italy	
1	Win	1–0	Ksenija Medic	PTS	6	27 May 2022	Bologna, Emilia-Romagna, Italy	
