= Alycia Baumgardner =

American professional boxer (born 1994)

Personal information
- Nickname: The Bomb
- Born: 27 May 1994 (age 32) Fremont, OH, U.S.
- Height: 5 ft 6 in (168 cm)
- Weight: Super featherweight Lightweight

Boxing career
- Reach: 66 in (168 cm)
- Stance: Orthodox

Boxing record
- Total fights: 21
- Wins: 19
- Win by KO: 7
- Losses: 1
- No contests: 1
Medal record
Women's amateur boxing
National Golden Gloves
Silver medal – second place	2014 Fort Lauderdale	Welterweight
US National PAL Championships
Gold medal – first place	2014 Oxnard	Lightweight

Alycia Baumgardner (born 27 May 1994) is an American professional boxer. She is a two-weight world champion having held the IBF female lightweight title since November 2026, and previously held the WBC and IBO female super featherweight titles from 2021 to 2025, the WBO, IBF, and The Ring female super featherweight titles from 2022 to 2026, and the WBA female super featherweight title from 2023 to 2026.

== Personal life ==
She is from Fremont, Ohio and now lives in Dallas, Texas. Baumgardner's mother is of German, Japanese and Korean descent, while her father is African-American.

== Professional career ==
=== Early career ===
Baumgardner made her professional debut against Britain Hart on March 4, 2017. She won the fight by a first-round technical knockout. Baumgardner notched her second win as a professional 22 days later, needing just 63 seconds to stop Wendy Toney. Her remaining two fights of the year ended just as fast, as she stopped Lashanda Tabron in 57 seconds on June 30, 2017, and Brittney Artis in 36 seconds on August 25, 2017.

Baumgardner faced Nydia Feliciano for the vacant WBC super featherweight title on February 10, 2018. She captured her first professional championship by unanimous decision. Baumgardner suffered her first loss as a professional in her first WBC International title defense, at the hands of Christina Linardatou on July 28, 2018.

Baumgardner faced Gabriella Mezei on May 10, 2019. She won the fight by a first-round technical knockout, her first stoppage victory in nearly two years. Baumgardner next faced Annette Pabello on November 2, 2019. She won the fight by unanimous decision. Baumgardner was then booked to face Cristina Del Valle Pacheco on December 14, 2019. She won the fight by another first-round technical knockout.

=== Unified super featherweight champion ===
==== Baumgardner vs. Harper ====
In October 2021, it was announced that Baumgardner would face WBC and IBO female super featherweight champion Terri Harper on 13 November 2021, Utilita Arena Sheffield. The fight was aired live on DAZN in the US and across the world as part of the undercard for Kiko Martinez vs. Kid Galahad. Baumgardner defeated Harper via a fourth round technical knockout. During the fight she dominated the second round and then caught Harper with a vicious right hand in the fourth, resulting in her going unbalanced with her whole body stiffened, which caused the referee to jump in to stop the bout. The referee was later praised by boxing pundits and fans for stepping in to stop the fight as Baumgardner had her hand in the air ready to pounce on Harper.

In December 2021, she signed a multi-fight promotional deal with Eddie Hearn's Matchroom Boxing. On 14 December 2021, her fourth round knockout against Terri Harper was adjudged as the 2021 Female Knockout of the Year by the World Boxing Council (WBC) as part of the WBC Best of the Year. In January 2021, it was also adjudged as Female Knockout of the Year by BoxingScene.com beating three others including Zulina Muñoz and Daniela Romina Bermúdez.

==== Baumgardner vs. Matthysse ====
In April 2022, Matchroom Boxing announced Baumgardner's first fight under the promotion to take place on 16 April against former unified featherweight world champion Edith Soledad Matthysse at the Manchester Arena. The bout was her first title defense. The fight was televised live on DAZN as part of the undercard of Conor Benn's WBA continental title defense bout against Chris van Heerden. Baumgardner successfully retained her WBC and IBO titles via unanimous decision (UD), dominiating over ten rounds, with all three judges' scorecards reading 100–90.

==== Baumgardner vs. Mayer ====
In October 2022, Baumgardner cut and outpointed Mikaela Mayer to take the WBC, IBF and WBO titles; scores of two of the cards read 96-95 for Baumgardner, with the third card going to Mayer 97-93. Boxing analysts and former world champions Timothy Bradley and Andre Ward noted Baumgardner's fast start, athletic style, and strong finish that seemingly flustered Mayer. Boxing analyst and boxer Shawn Porter also reported on Baumgardner's noteworthy skillset after the "upset" victory. According to CompuBox stats, Baumgardner outlanded Mayer in total punches 116 to 104, was more efficient in her output landing 35% of punches to Mayer's 29%, and connected with significantly more power shots: Baumgardner landed 82 power shots, nearly doubling Mayer's 43.

=== Undisputed super featherweight champion ===
==== Baumgardner vs. Mekhaled ====
On November 15, 2022, the WBA ordered their junior lightweight champion Choi Hyun-mi to face Baumgardner in a title unification bout. Choi withdrew from the negotiations on December 13, which led to her being declared a "champion-in-recess" by the sanctioning body, due to her declared injury status. Baumgardner instead faced the next highest ranked WBA contender Elhem Mekhaled for the now vacant championship. The vacant title bout took place on February 4, 2023, at the Hulu Theater in New York City and was broadcast by DAZN. Baumgardner twice knocked Mekhaled down in the third round, en-route to winning the fight by unanimous decision, with two scorecards of 99–89 and one scorecard of 98–90.

==== Baumgardner vs. Linardatou II ====
Baumgardner made her first undisputed world super featherweight title defense against the former two-time WBO female junior-welterweight champion Christina Linardatou, who handed Baumgardner the sole loss of her professional career, on July 28, 2018, when she was able to beat her by split decision. The championship bout was booked as the main event of a DAZN broadcast card that took place at The Masonic Temple Detroit in Detroit, Michigan on July 15, 2023. Baumgardner won the fight by a clear unanimous decision, with two scorecards of 99–91 and one scorecard of 98–92.

Matchroom Boxing announced on August 16 that Baumgardner had tested positive for a banned substance on her July 12 sample, but her June 16 and the July 16 samples both came back clean. She denied using any banned substance.

Following an investigation, Baumgardner was deemed by the WBC as “not guilty of intentional ingestion or consumption of a banned substance for performance enhancement purposes” and in March 2024, the Association of Boxing Commissions lifted her temporary suspension officially clearing her to return to boxing.

==== Baumgardner vs. Persoon ====
Baumgardner was scheduled to defend WBC super featherweight title against Delfine Persoon on September 27, 2024 in Atlanta, GA. The fight was stopped and ruled a No Contest in the fourth round due to a cut Persoon suffered over her right eye from an accidental head clash.

==== Baumgardner vs. Miranda ====
Baumgardner defended her undisputed super featherweight title against Jennifer Miranda at Madison Square Garden in New York on 11 July 2025. She won by unanimous decision.

=== Signing with Most Valuable Promotions ===
On March 18, 2025, it was announced that Baumgardner had signed with Most Valuable Promotions.

==== Baumgardner vs. Beaudoin ====
In September 2025, Baumgardner vacated her WBC title and it was announced she would defend her IBF, WBO and WBA championships against Leila Beaudoin at the Kaseya Center in Miami, Florida on the undercard of the Jake Paul vs. Gervonta Davis fight on 14 November 2025. However, the event was cancelled less than two weeks before it was set to take place due Davis' legal issues. The contest was rescheduled to take place at the same venue on 19 December 2025 as part of the undercard of the Jake Paul vs. Anthony Joshua fight. Baumgardner won the bout, which unlike most women's championship fights was contested over 12 three-minute rounds, by unanimous decision.

==== Baumgardner vs. Shin ====
Baumgardner defended her titles against Bo Mi Re Shin at The Theater at Madison Square Garden in New York on 17 April 2026, winning via unanimous decision.

==== Baumgardner vs. Nur Turhan ====
Baumgardner stepped up in weight division to challenge IBF female lightweight champion Elif Nur Turhan at College Park Center in Arlington, Texas, on 8 November 2026. She won by unanimous decision with all three ringside judges scoring the fight, which was contested over 10 three-minute rounds, 100–90 in her favour.

On 18 November 2026, Baumgardner vacated all her super-featherweight titles, stating her intention to continue campaign at lightweight.

== Professional boxing record ==
21 fights	19 wins	1 loss
By knockout	7	0
By decision	12	1
No contests	1	

No.	Result	Record	Opponent	Type	Round, time	Date	Location	Notes
21	Win	19–1 (1)	Elif Nur Turhan	UD	10	Nov 8, 2026	College Park Center, Arlington, Texas, U.S.	Won IBF female lightweight title
20	Win	18–1 (1)	Bo Mi Re Shin	UD	10	Apr 17, 2026	The Theater at Madison Square Garden, New York City, U.S.	Retained WBA, IBF, WBO, & The Ring female super featherweight titles
19	Win	17–1 (1)	Leila Beaudoin	UD	12	Dec 19, 2025	Kaseya Center, Miami, Florida, U.S.	Retained WBA, IBF, WBO, IBO & The Ring female super featherweight titles
18	Win	16–1 (1)	Jennifer Miranda	UD	10	Jul 11, 2025	Madison Square Garden, New York City, New York, U.S.	Retained WBA, WBC, IBF, WBO, IBO & The Ring female super featherweight titles
17	NC	15–1 (1)	Delfine Persoon	NC	4 (10), 1:15	Sep 27, 2024	Lux Studios, Atlanta, Georgia, U.S.	Retained WBA, WBC, IBF, WBO, & The Ring female super featherweight titles; Persoon suffered a cut above her right eye due to a head clash in the fourth round
16	Win	15–1	Christina Linardatou	UD	10	Jul 15, 2023	Masonic Temple, Detroit, Michigan, U.S.	Retained WBA, WBC, IBF, WBO, IBO & The Ring female super featherweight titles
15	Win	14–1	Elhem Mekhaled	UD	10	Feb 4, 2023	Hulu Theater, New York City, New York, U.S.	Retained WBC, IBF, WBO, IBO & The Ring female super featherweight titles; Won vacant WBA female super featherweight title
14	Win	13–1	Mikaela Mayer	SD	10	Oct 15, 2022	O2 Arena, London, England	Retained WBC and IBO female super featherweight titles; Won WBO, IBF, and The Ring female super featherweight titles
13	Win	12–1	Edith Soledad Matthysse	UD	10	Apr 17, 2022	AO Arena, Manchester, England	Retained WBC and IBO female super featherweight titles
12	Win	11–1	Terri Harper	TKO	4 (10), 0:22	Nov 13, 2021	Utilta Arena, Sheffield, England	Won WBC and IBO female super featherweight titles
11	Win	10–1	Vanessa Bradford	UD	10	Aug 14, 2021	Caribe Royale Orlando, Orlando, Florida, U.S.	
10	Win	9–1	Cristina Del Valle Pacheco	TKO	1 (8), 1:46	Dec 14, 2019	Zembo Shrine Building, Harrisburg, Pennsylvania, U.S.	
9	Win	8–1	Annette Pabello	UD	6	Nov 2, 2019	Sun Dome, Tampa, Florida, U.S.	
8	Win	7–1	Gabriella Mezei	TKO	1 (6), 1:08	May 10, 2019	2300 Arena, Philadelphia, Pennsylvania, U.S.	
7	Loss	6–1	Christina Linardatou	SD	8	Jul 28, 2018	Davis Arena, Louisville, Kentucky, U.S.	Lost WBC International female super featherweight title
6	Win	6–0	Kirstie Simmons	SD	6	Apr 27, 2018	KFC Yum! Center, Louisville, Kentucky, U.S.	
5	Win	5–0	Nydia Feliciano	UD	8	Feb 10, 2018	2300 Arena, Philadelphia, Pennsylvania, U.S.	Won vacant WBC International female super featherweight title
4	Win	4–0	Brittney Artis	TKO	1 (4), 0:36	Aug 25, 2017	DeCarlo's Convention Center, Warren, Michigan, U.S.	
3	Win	3–0	Lashanda Tabron	TKO	1 (4), 0:57	Jun 30, 2017	Huntington Center, Toledo, Ohio, U.S.	
2	Win	2–0	Wendy Toney	TKO	1 (4), 1:03	Mar 26, 2017	Ford Community Center, Dearborn, Michigan, U.S.	
1	Win	1–0	Britain Hart	TKO	1 (4), 2:38	Mar 4, 2017	Hollywood Casino Columbus, Columbus, Ohio, U.S.	

== See also ==
- List of female boxers
- List of female undisputed world boxing champions
- List of German Americans
- List of Japanese Americans
- List of Korean Americans
- List of IBF female world champions
- List of IBO female world champions
- List of The Ring female world champions
- List of WBA female world champions
- List of WBC female world champions
- List of WBO female world champions

Sporting positions
Minor world boxing titles
Preceded by Terri Harper	IBO female super featherweight champion November 13, 2021 – present	Incumbent
Major world boxing titles
Preceded by Terri Harper	WBC female super featherweight champion November 13, 2021 – present	Incumbent
Preceded by Mikaela Mayer	IBF female super featherweight champion October 15, 2022 – present	Incumbent
Preceded by Mikaela Mayer	WBO female super featherweight champion October 15, 2022 – present	Incumbent
Preceded by Mikaela Mayer	The Ring female super featherweight champion October 15, 2022 – present	Incumbent
Vacant Title last held by Choi Hyun-mi	WBA female super featherweight champion February 4, 2023 – present	Incumbent
Inaugural champion	Undisputed female super featherweight champion February 4, 2023 – present	Incumbent
