= Vicky Wilkinson =

English boxer (born 1983)

Personal information
- Nationality: (England) English
- Born: Victoria Wilkinson; 27 May 1983 (age 43)
- Weight: Super-featherweight, Lightweight

Boxing career
- Stance: Orthodox

Boxing record
- Total fights: 8
- Wins: 5
- Losses: 2
- Draws: 1

Vicky Wilkinson (born 27 May 1983) is an English former professional boxer. She was the first woman to win a British Boxing Board of Control Midlands Area title. Wilkinson also fought for Commonwealth titles on three occasions.

== Career ==
Having switched from kickboxing to boxing due to an ankle injury and winning two England Development Championships as an amateur, Wilkinson turned professional in 2021.

In her fourth fight she faced Kristine Shergold for the vacant Commonwealth female super-featherweight title at the Riviera International Conference Centre in Torquay on 2 September 2022. The bout ended in a majority draw with one judge scoring it 98–92 for Wilkinson, but the other two unable to split the boxers at 95–95.

On 13 November 2022, Wilkinson made history when she became the first woman to win a British Boxing Board of Control Midlands Area title by defeating Beccy Ferguson on points at The Hangar Events Venue in Wolverhampton to claim the inaugural super-featherweight championship.

Moving up in weight categories, she faced unbeaten, future world champion, Rhiannon Dixon, for the vacant Commonwealth female lightweight title at Liverpool Arena on 11 March 2023. Wilkinson was sent to the canvas twice in the sixth round due to punches to her body, before the referee halted the fight, awarding her opponent a technical knockout victory.

On 15 September 2023, she made a third attempt to claim a Commonwealth belt, returning to super-featherweight to face Kirsty Hill for the vacant title back at The Hangar Events Venue. However, she fell short once again, suffering a unanimous decision loss. Wilkinson announced her retirement from professional boxing immediately after the fight.
