= RAF Winthorpe =

Former Royal Air Force flying station in Nottinghamshire, England

RAF Winthorpe
- Winthorpe, Nottinghamshire in England
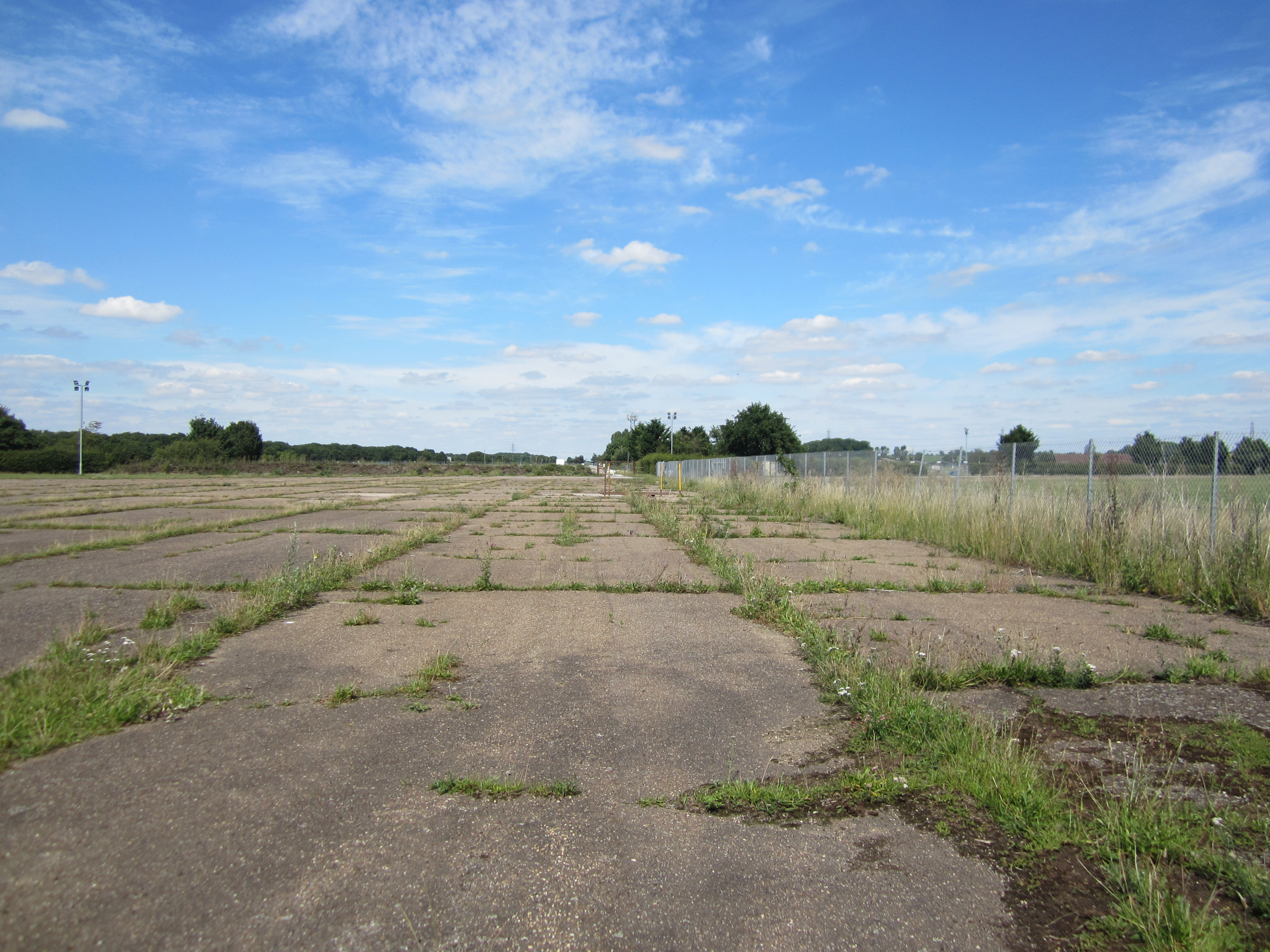
- The runway at RAF Winthorpe, now used to host shows at Newark Showground

Site information
- Code: WE
- Owner: Air Ministry
- Operator: Royal Air Force
- Controlled by: RAF Bomber Command * No. 5 Group RAF * No. 7 (T) Group RAF

Location
- Shown within Nottinghamshire RAF Winthorpe (the United Kingdom)
- Coordinates: 53.097647°N 0.770470°W

Site history
- Built: 1939/40
- In use: September 1940 - July 1959
- Battles/wars: European theatre of World War II

Airfield information
- Elevation: 16 metres (52 ft) AMSL
Runways
Direction	Length and surface
00/00	Concrete
00/00	Concrete
00/00	Concrete

Royal Air Force Winthorpe, or more simply RAF Winthorpe, is a former Royal Air Force station located 1.5 miles (2.4 km) north-east of Newark in Nottinghamshire, England. It is now the site of Newark Air Museum and Newark Showground.

It initially opened as a satellite station for RAF Swinderby in 1940, being used by 300 and 301 Polish squadrons and later, 1661 HCU of No. 5 Group.

The station was declared inactive in 1959.

== History ==
=== Second World War ===
RAF Winthorpe was opened as a Bomber Command station in September 1940 as a part of the expansion period of the late 1930s. It was intended to be used by 300 and 301 Polish bomber squadrons flying Fairey Battles. Both squadrons were based at RAF Swinderby and used Winthorpe as a satellite station. No. 300 squadron moved to Winthorpe on 22 August 1940 with 301 squadron following a week later. The station was initially commanded by 2nd Colonel Wacklaw Makosli.

After much training, the two squadrons carried out their first raid on 14/15 September 1940. Their target was a number of invasion barges in Boulogne Harbour. All aircraft returned safely.

On 14 October, a raid by the Luftwaffe dropped a single parachute mine onto Winthorpe airfield. This left a large crater in the grass runway but there was no loss of life.

Although both squadrons had had success with their outdated Fairey Battles (dropping a combined total of more than 45 tons of bombs) in late October 1940, 301 squadron received their first 2 Vickers Wellingtons. By January 1941, 301 squadron had fully converted to Wellingtons.

A raid on 13/14 January 1941 was subject to bad weather, causing the rough landing of a 301 squadron Wellington, blocking the runway, causing the rest of the squadron to divert to other airfields. 2 more Wellingtons crashed on the landing approach to Digby with only 1 survivor between them. The bad weather rendered Swinderby inoperable for the rest of the month of January, forcing training to take place at Winthorpe, with crews flying out to RAF Syerston and RAF Newton to be loaded with their bombs.

On 14 July 1941, both 300 and 301 squadrons were transferred to RAF Hemswell.

After the departure of the two Polish squadrons, RAF Winthorpe saw very little activity. Control of the station was passed over to RAF Ossington. Winthorpe was briefly used in late 1941 by 455 squadron with their now-obsolete Handley Page Hampdens, but they had left by February 1942.

In early 1942, Winthorpe underwent major reconstruction with the building of 3 hard runways in the standard A-shaped bomber configuration. After this period, Swinderby took back control of Winthorpe from Ossington. In 1942 Winthorpe was used as a training station for Avro Manchester and Avro Lancaster bomber crews (though production of the Manchester was swiftly halted due to its unpopularity amongst crews and underpowered engines).

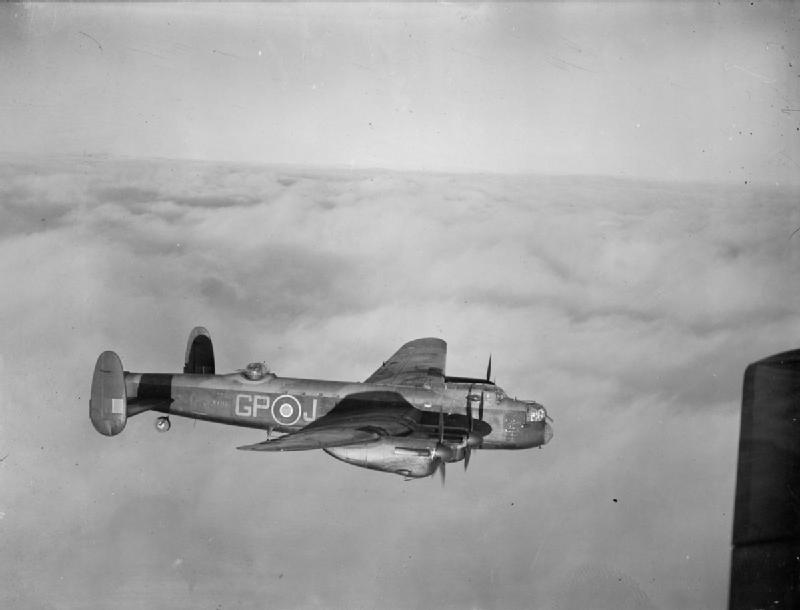
An Avro Lancaster of No. 1661 Heavy Conversion Unit RAF from RAF Winthorpe

The Lancasters of 1661 Heavy Conversion Unit (5 Group) carried out sorties over the period of the war, pausing in 1943 as the perimeter track was rebuilt to prevent aircraft from sinking into the ground.

In late autumn 1943, 16 Handley Page Halifaxes arrived at Winthorpe to replace the Manchesters. However, soon after, the Halifaxes were required elsewhere in Bomber Command, and so were replaced at Winthorpe by Short Stirlings.

In March 1944, 3 Miles Martinets of 1690 Bomber Defence Training Flight arrived at Winthorpe as Target tugs before returning to RAF Scampton in July of the same year.

In November 1944, Winthorpe was transferred from No. 5 group to No. 7 Group. At the same time, all Stirlings at the station were replaced by Lancasters.

By 1945, Winthorpe was home to Hawker Hurricanes and Supermarine Spitfires for escort training.

After the war ended, on 10 September 1945 1661 HCU group was disbanded.

=== Post-War ===
By 20 September 1945, Winthorpe was under the control of the RAF Transport Command, and soon became a satellite station of RAF Syerston of No. 4 Group where they operated Handley Page Halifaxes, Douglas Dakotas, Airspeed Oxfords and Airspeed Horsas.

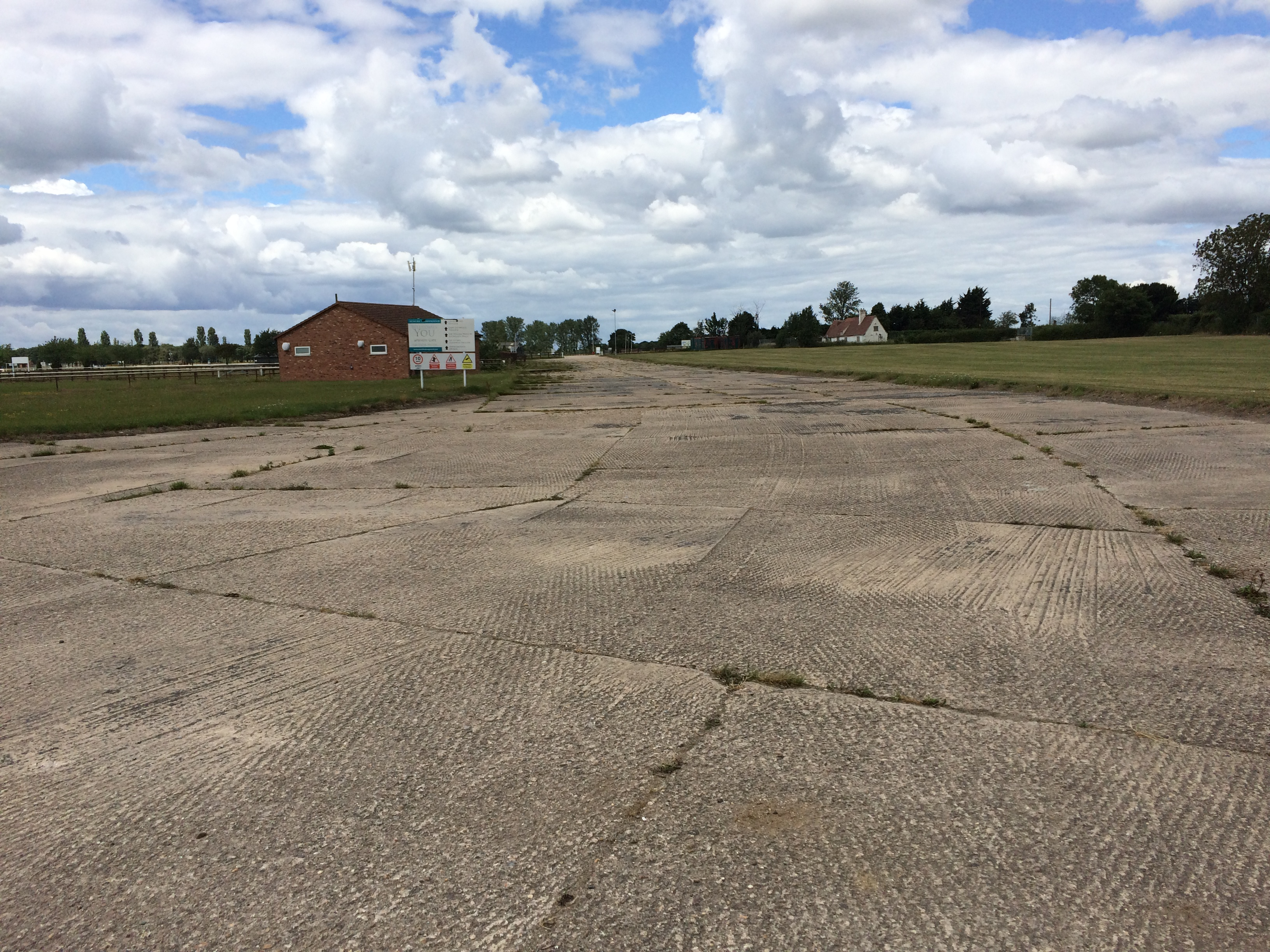
Part of a taxiway. Now part of Newark Showground

The station was declared inactive in July 1959.

The following units were also here at some point:

- No. 54 Maintenance Unit RAF between March and September 1953
- Sub site of No. 61 Maintenance Unit RAF between February 1946 and October 1948
- Satellite of No. 1331 Heavy Transport Conversion Unit RAF
- Dropping zone for No. 1333 (Transport Support) Conversion Unit RAF between November 1945 and July 1946 became No. 1333 Transport Support Training Unit RAF between July 1946 and July 1947
- No. 2776 Squadron RAF Regiment
- Central Servicing Development Establishment RAF between February 1953 and January 1958

== Modern-day use ==
In 1964, the Newark and Nottinghamshire Agricultural Society purchased 200 acres of land from the former RAF Winthorpe, opening it as Newark Showground in 1965.

In 1978, Newark Air Museum opened on a portion of the former station's site and began flying in aircraft for static display.
