= Lolita Muzeya =

Zambian boxer (born 1991)

Personal information
- Nickname: The Black Diamond
- Born: 11 January 1991 (age 35) Mwinilunga, Zambia
- Weight: Welterweight; Middleweight

Boxing career
- Stance: Orthodox

Boxing record
- Total fights: 17
- Wins: 16
- Win by KO: 8
- Losses: 1

Lolita Muzeya (born 11 January 1991) is a Zambian professional boxer who held the WBC Silver female welterweight title in 2016. She also challenged for the WBO female middleweight title in 2021.

== Professional career ==
Muzeya made her professional debut on 23 March 2013, with a four-round unanimous decision (UD) victory against Agness Mtimaukanena at the Government Complex in Lusaka, Zambia.

After compiling a record of 10–0 (3 KOs), she defeated Mtimaukanena for a second time, winning via third-round technical knockout (TKO) to capture the vacant WBC Silver female welterweight on 14 October 2016, at the International Conference Center in Harare, Zimbabwe.

Muzeya challenged reigning champion Savannah Marshall for the WBO female middleweight title on 16 October 2021, at the Utilita Arena in Newcastle, England. She lost by technical knockout in the second round.

== Professional boxing record ==
17 fights	16 wins	1 loss
By knockout	8	1
By decision	8	0

No.	Result	Record	Opponent	Type	Round, time	Date	Location	Notes
17	Loss	16–1	(United Kingdom) Savannah Marshall	TKO	2 (10), 2:58	16 Oct 2021	(United Kingdom) Utilita Arena, Newcastle, England	For WBO female middleweight title
16	Win	16–0	(Tanzania) Happy Daudi	KO	1 (6), 1:58	29 Jan 2021	Next Door Arena, Dar es Salaam, Tanzania	
15	Win	15–0	(Zimbabwe) Emily Kabwalo	TKO	2 (8), 0:18	13 Oct 2018	Government Complex, Lusaka, Zambia	
14	Win	14–0	(Tanzania) Asha Ngedere	TKO	1 (8), 0:24	28 Apr 2018	City Mall, Solwezi, Zambia	
13	Win	13–0	(Malawi) Ruth Chisale	UD	8	30 Dec 2017	Government Complex, Lusaka, Zambia	
12	Win	12–0	(Kenya) Joice Awino	KO	1 (8), 1:06	2 Jul 2017	Zmart Mall, Ndola, Zambia	
11	Win	11–0	(Malawi) Agness Mtimaukanena	TKO	3 (10)	14 Oct 2016	Harare International Conference Center, Harare, Zimbabwe	Won vacant WBC Silver female welterweight title
10	Win	10–0	(Malawi) Anisha Basheel	UD	8	27 Aug 2016	Government Complex, Lusaka, Zambia	
9	Win	9–0	(Malawi) Anisha Basheel	UD	8	13 May 2016	Umodzi Conference Centre, Lilongwe, Malawi	
8	Win	8–0	(Malawi) Anisha Basheel	TKO	4 (6)	28 Nov 2015	National Sports Development Centre, Lusaka, Zambia	
7	Win	7–0	(Malawi) Enelless Nkhwanthi	KO	1 (6)	2 May 2015	Mulungushi Conference Centre, Lusaka, Zambia	
6	Win	6–0	(Zimbabwe) Monalisa Sibanda	KO	4 (6)	22 Nov 2014	Government Complex, Lusaka, Zambia	
5	Win	5–0	(Zambia) Chitalu Mulenga	PTS	6	3 May 2014	Mongu Stadium, Lusaka, Zambia	
4	Win	4–0	(Zimbabwe) Monalisa Sibanda	UD	6	15 Mar 2013	Government Complex, Lusaka, Zambia	
3	Win	3–0	(Zambia) Chitalu Mulenga	PTS	6	27 Sep 2013	Lusaka, Zambia	
2	Win	2–0	(Zambia) Joyce Chilesh	PTS	4	11 May 2013	Kitwe, Zambia	
1	Win	1–0	(Malawi) Agness Mtimaukanena	UD	4	23 Mar 2013	Government Complex, Lusaka, Zambia	

Sporting positions
World boxing titles
Vacant Title last held by Aleksandra Magdziak Lopes	WBC female welterweight champion Silver title 14 October 2016 – 2017	Vacant
