= Ewa Piątkowska =

Polish boxer

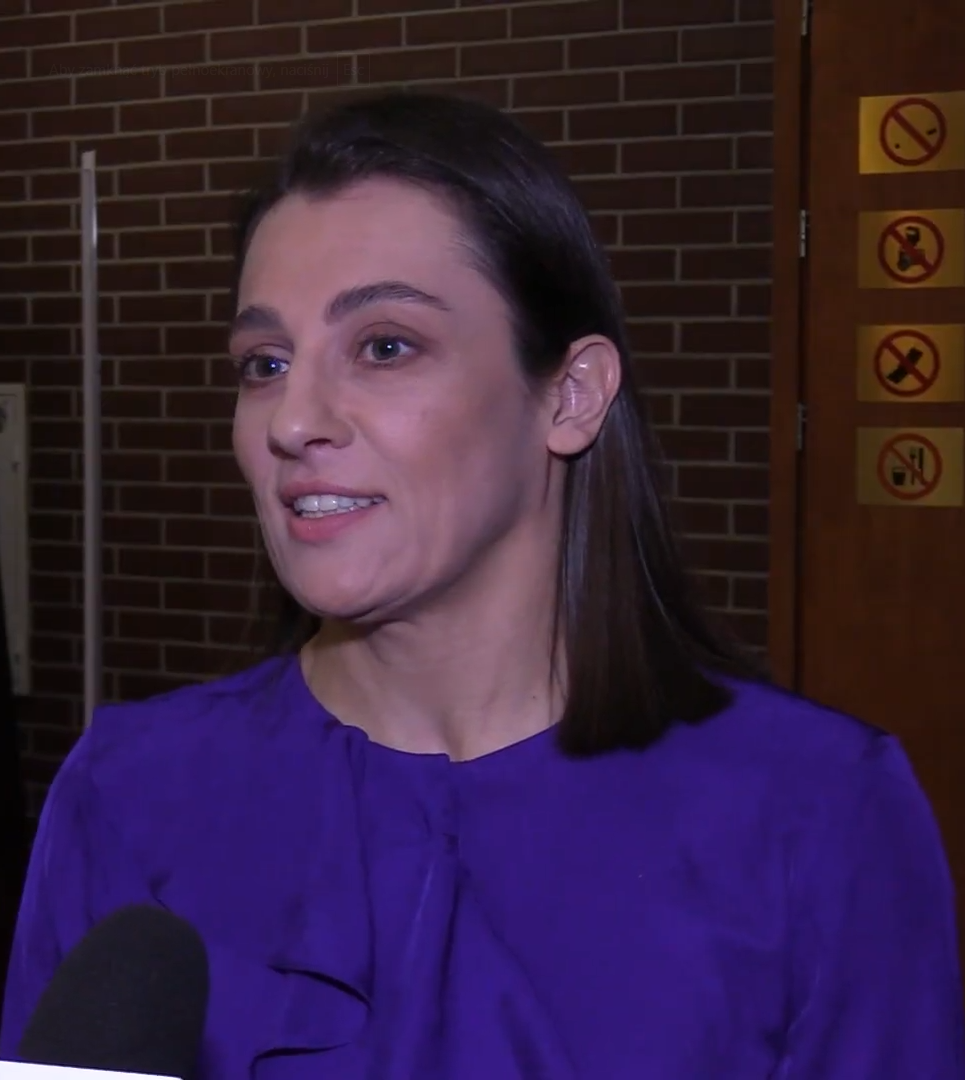

Personal information
- Nickname: Tigress
- Born: Ewa Maria Piątkowska; September 16, 1984 (age 41) Radom, Poland
- Height: 5 ft 9 in (175 cm)
- Weight: Light welterweight; Welterweight; Light middleweight

Boxing career
- Reach: 69 1/2 in (177 cm)
- Stance: Orthodox

Boxing record
- Total fights: 17
- Wins: 16
- Win by KO: 4
- Losses: 1

Ewa Piątkowska (born 16 September 1984) is a Polish female professional boxer.

== Professional career ==
Piątkowska turned profession in 2013 & compiled a record of 7–1 before beating Ewa Brodnicka, to win the vacant European welterweight title in 2015. The following year she won the world title at light-middleweight by beating compatriot Aleksandra Magdziak Lopes for the vacant title.

=== Cancelled fights ===
==== Mikaela Laurén ====
She was poised to defend her title against former champion Mikaela Laurén, but had to withdraw due to a back injury.

==== Natasha Jonas ====
She was scheduled to fight for the vacant WBO light-middleweight title against Natasha Jonas but had to withdraw due to contracting COVID.

== Professional boxing record ==
17 fights	4 wins	13 losses
By knockout	4	12
By decision	0	1

No.	Result	Record	Opponent	Type	Round, time	Date	Location	Notes
17	Win	16–1	Judy Waguthii	UD	6	14 May 2021	Studio Transcolor, Szeligi, Poland	
16	Win	15–1	Róża Gumienna	MD	6	5 Dec 2020	DoubleTree by Hilton Hotel Conference Centre, Warsaw, Poland	
15	Win	14–1	Karina Kopinska	UD	6	12 Jun 2020	Palac w Konarach, Konary, Poland	
14	Win	13–1	Kamilla Boka	PTS	6	12 Jul 2019	GBK, Dzierżoniów, Poland	
13	Win	12–1	Ornella Domini	UD	10	17 Nov 2018	Gliwice Hall, Gliwice, Poland	Retained WBC light-middleweight title
12	Win	11–1	Maria Lindberg	MD	10	17 May 2018	Stadion Narodowy, Warsaw, Poland	Retained WBC light-middleweight title
11	Win	10–1	Aleksandra Magdziak Lopes	UD	10	17 Sep 2016	Ergo Arena, Gdańsk, Poland	Won vacant WBC light-middleweight title
10	Win	9–1	Karina Kopinska	UD	6	7 May 2016	Sport Hall, Tarnów, Poland	
9	Win	8–1	Marie Riederer	UD	10	27 Nov 2015	Sport Hall, Rzeszów, Poland	Won vacant European welterweight title
8	Loss	7–1	Ewa Brodnicka	SD	8	26 Sep 2015	Atlas Arena, Łódź, Poland	
7	Win	7–0	Jane Kavulani	UD	10	10 Apr 2015	Sport Hall, Gliwice, Poland	Won vacant WBC Silver light-welterweight title
6	Win	6–0	Sabrina Giuliani	UD	8	31 Jan 2015	Sport Hall, Toruń, Poland	
5	Win	5–0	Zsofia Bedo	TKO	3 (6), 0:21	18 Oct 2014	Sport Hall, Nowy Dwór Mazowiecki, Poland	
4	Win	4–0	Klaudia Szymczak	UD	4	31 May 2014	Globus Hall, Lublin, Poland	
3	Win	3–0	Dasa Gaborova	KO	1 (4), 0:40	15 Mar 2014	Hotel Arłamów, Arłamów, Poland	
2	Win	2–0	Pavla Votavova	TKO	1 (4)	31 Aug 2013	Sportgym Radom, Radom, Poland	
1	Win	1–0	Maja Jahic	TKO	1 (4), 1:12	16 Feb 2013	Sport Place, Pionki, Poland	

== See also ==
- List of female boxers

Sporting positions
Regional boxing titles
Vacant Title last held by Klara Svensson	WBC Silver light-welterweight champion 10 April 2015 – 17 September 2016; Won world title	Vacant Title next held by Myriam Dellal
Vacant Title last held by Ornella Domini	European welterweight champion 27 November 2015 – 17 September 2016; Won world title	Vacant Title next held by Ornella Domini
World boxing titles
Vacant Title last held by Mikaela Laurén	WBC light-middleweight champion 17 September 2016 – 2019; Vacated	Vacant Title next held by Claressa Shields
