= Newark Air Museum =

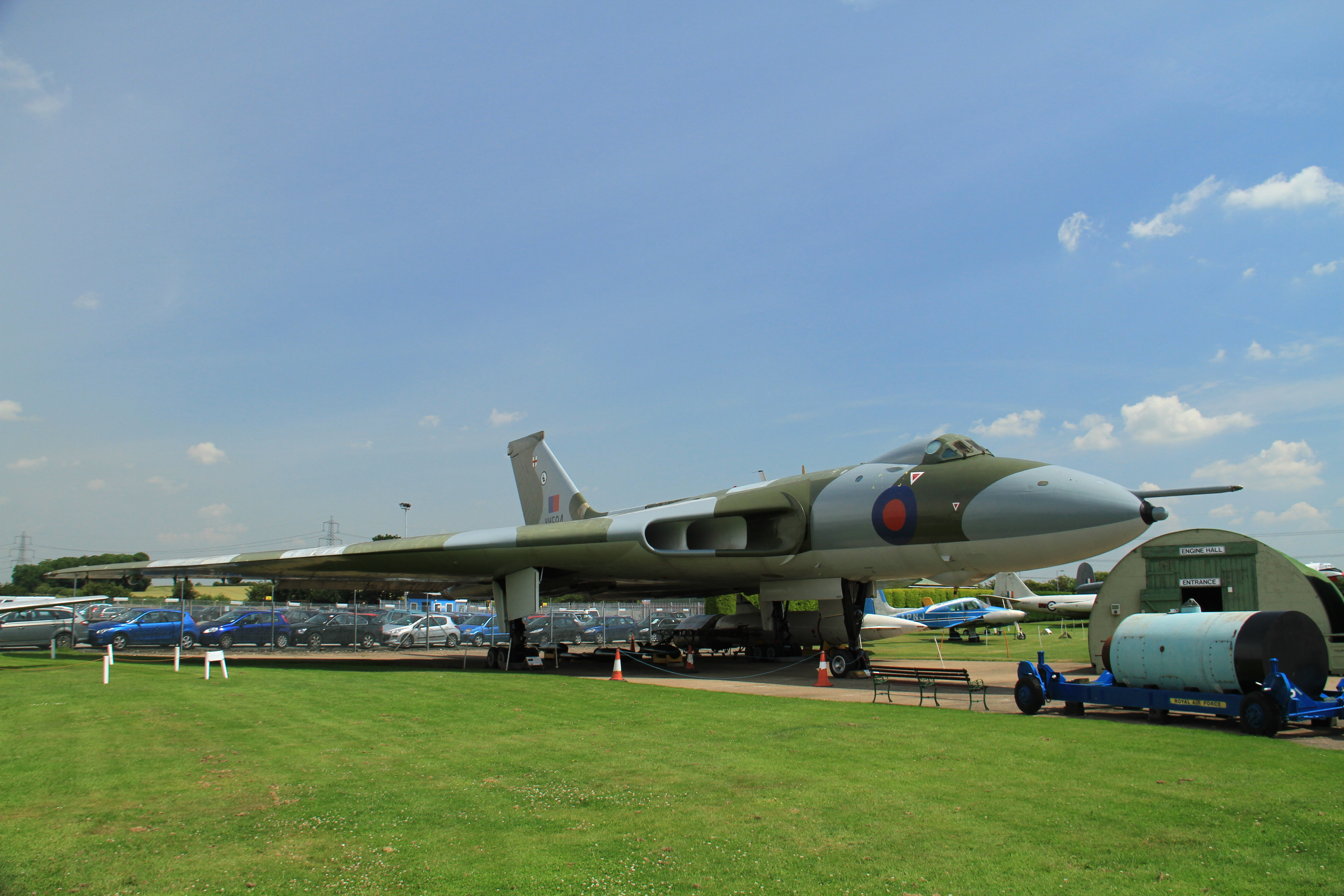
- Avro Vulcan B.2 XM594 at the Newark Air Museum

- Location within Nottinghamshire
- Established: 1973
- Location: Newark-on-Trent, Nottinghamshire
- Coordinates: 53.09600°N 0.75741°W
- Type: Aviation museum
- Website: www.newarkairmuseum.org

Newark Air Museum is an air museum located on a former Royal Air Force station at Winthorpe, near Newark-on-Trent in Nottinghamshire, England. The museum contains a variety of aircraft.

== History ==
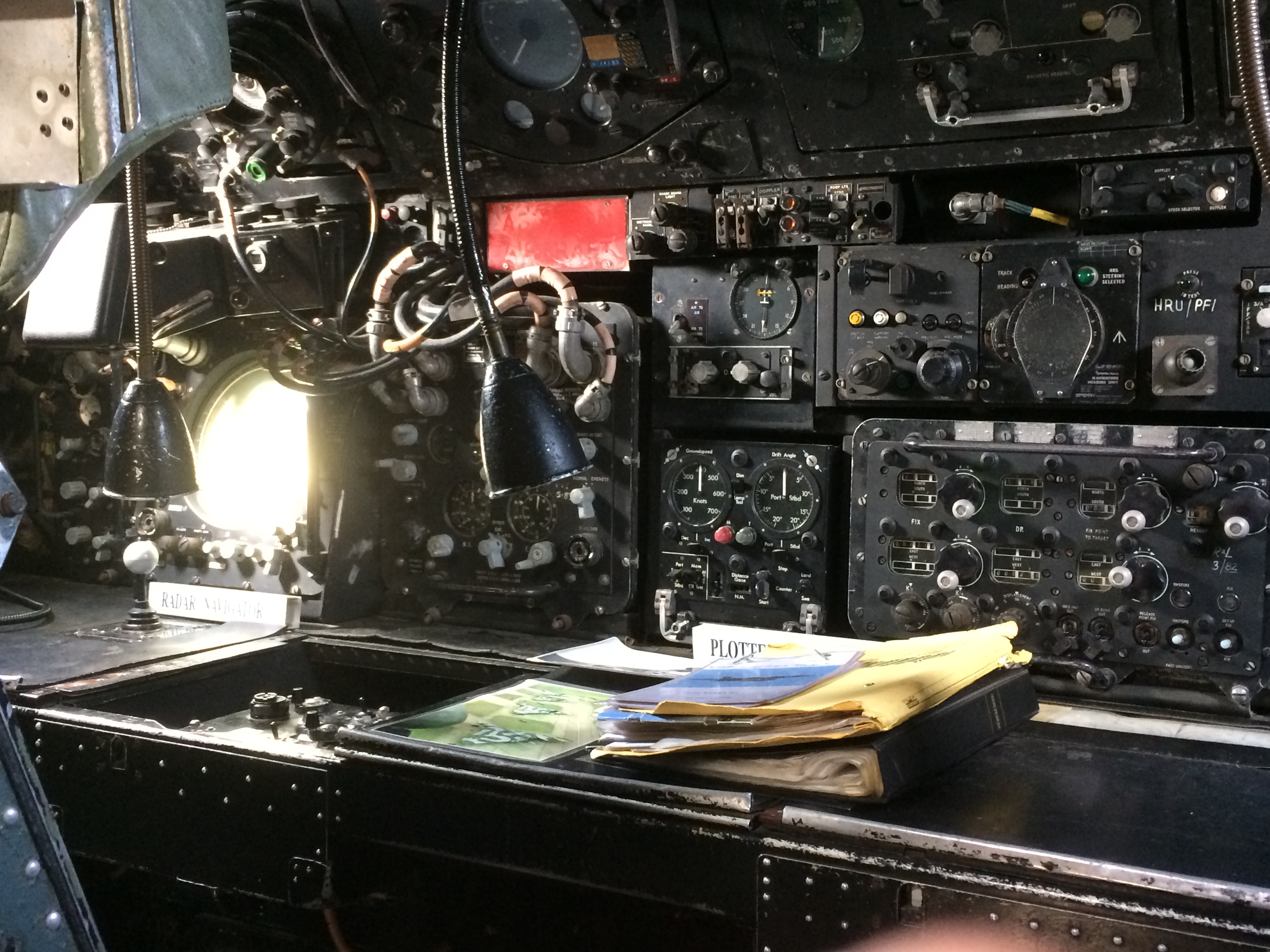
The flight deck of the Avro Vulcan

The airfield was known as RAF Winthorpe during the Second World War, opening in September 1940. From 1942 to 1944, it housed No. 1661 Heavy Conversion Unit, training Avro Lancaster crews, in No. 5 Group with around thirty planes. In 1944 it joined No. 7 Group, still within Bomber Command. In 1945 it transferred to Transport Command.

The following units were posted at RAF Winthorp at some point:

- No. 54 Maintenance Unit.
- No. 61 Maintenance Unit.
- No. 1331 Heavy Transport Conversion Unit.
- No. 1333 (Transport Support) Conversion Unit which became No. 1333 (Transport Support) Training Unit RAF.
- Central Servicing Development Establishment RAF.

In 1964, 200 acres (0.81 km^{2}) of the former airfield were purchased by the Newark and Nottinghamshire Agricultural Society, who have since held the Newark and Nottinghamshire County Show. A limited company called Newark (Nottinghamshire and Lincolnshire) Air Museum was formed in 1968. The museum officially opened on 14 April 1973. In 1990, the museum opened its first exhibition hall. This was followed by the purchase of an additional 12.38 acres (0.0501 km^{2}) of land that became known as the Southfield Site. A second display hall was opened on this property in 2004. The museum purchased the land on which it sits by early June 2026.

== Collection ==
- Armstrong Whitworth Argosy C.1 (cockpit section)
- Auster AOP.9 (fuselage / wings)
- Aviasud Sirocco
- Avro Anson C.19
- Avro Ashton (forward fuselage)
- Avro Shackleton MR.3/3
- Avro Vulcan B.2
- Bensen B-8
- Blackburn Beverley C.1 (cockpit section)
- Blackburn Buccaneer S.1
- Blackburn Buccaneer S.2B (cockpit section)
- Boeing-Vertol Chinook HC.1 (fuselage)
- Bristol Sycamore III
- British Aerospace Sea Harrier FA.2
- Cessna 310
- Clutton FRED Series 2
- Dassault Mystère IV
- de Havilland Dove
- de Havilland Heron 1B
- de Havilland Sea Venom FAW.21
- de Havilland Sea Vixen FAW.2
- de Havilland Tiger Moth
- de Havilland Vampire T.11
- de Havilland Venom NF.3
- de Havilland Canada DHC-1 Chipmunk T.10
- English Electric Canberra B.2 (Mod)
- English Electric Canberra PR.7
- English Electric Canberra PR.9 (cockpit section)
- English Electric Canberra T.17 (cockpit section)
- English Electric Canberra T.19
- English Electric Lightning T.5
- English Electric Lightning F.6 (cockpit section)
- Fairey Gannet AEW.3
- General Aircraft Monospar ST-12
- Gloster Javelin FAW.8
- Gloster Meteor F.8
- Gloster Meteor FR.9 (Mod)
- Gloster Meteor NF.12
- Gloster Meteor NF.14
- Gloster Meteor T.7
- GAF Jindivik Mk.103
- Handley Page Hastings T.5
- Handley Page Jetstream
- Hawker Hunter F.1
- Hawker Hunter T.7
- Hawker Sea Hawk FB.3
- Hawker Siddeley Dominie T.1
- Hawker Siddeley Gnat T.1
- Hiway Skytrike
- Hunting Jet Provost T.3 (cockpit section)
- Hunting Jet Provost T.3A
- Lee-Richards annular biplane (replica)
- Lockheed T-33A
- Lockheed TriStar SIM (cockpit)
- Luscombe P3 Rattler Strike
- Maxair Hummer
- McDonnell Douglas Phantom FGR.2 (nose section)
- MBA Tiger Cub 440
- Mignet HM.14 Flying Flea (Note: Formerly owned by A. W. Troop then the Lincolnshire Aviation Museum.)
- Mignet HM.14 Flying Flea (cockpit section) (Note: Formerly owned by the Lincolnshire Aviation Museum.)
- Mikoyan-Gurevich MiG-23ML
- Mikoyan MiG-27K
- Mooney M20A
- North American Harvard
- North American F-100 Super Sabre
- Percival Prentice
- Percival Provost
- Powerchute Kestrel
- PZL SZD-30 Pirat
- Quicksilver MX
- Saab Draken
- Saab Safir
- Saab AJSH 37 Viggen
- Saunders-Roe Skeeter AOP.12
- Scottish Aviation Bulldog T.1
- SEPECAT Jaguar T.2A
- SEPECAT Jaguar (cockpit)
- Sherwood Ranger
- Slingsby Cadet TX.1
- Slingsby Grasshopper TX.1
- Slingsby Motor Cadet T.7
- Slingsby T67 Firefly SIM
- SOCATA MS.880 Rallye
- Sud-Aviation SA 341 Gazelle
- Supermarine Swift FR.5
- Taylor Monoplane
- Tasuma CSV 30 UAV
- Tasuma CSV 30 UAV ‘Navigator’
- Tasuma Obsever UAV
- Tiger Cub Developments Sherwood Ranger
- Vickers Varsity
- Volmer VJ-24
- Ward Gnome
- Westland Lynx HC.28
- Sud-Westland Puma HC.1
- Westland (Bell) Sioux AH.1
- Westland Wessex HC.2
- Westland Whirlwind HAS.7
- Zurowski ZP.1

== Events ==
The Air Museum has, for the past few years, hosted the annual Cockpitfest. This popular event calls on enthusiasts and 'cockpitters' alike to bring their memorabilia for others to see and, in the case of cockpits, get inside. The Cockpitfest celebrated its 10th anniversary in June 2009.

== See also ==
- List of aerospace museums
