= Ward Gnome =

Single seat sports aircraft

Gnome
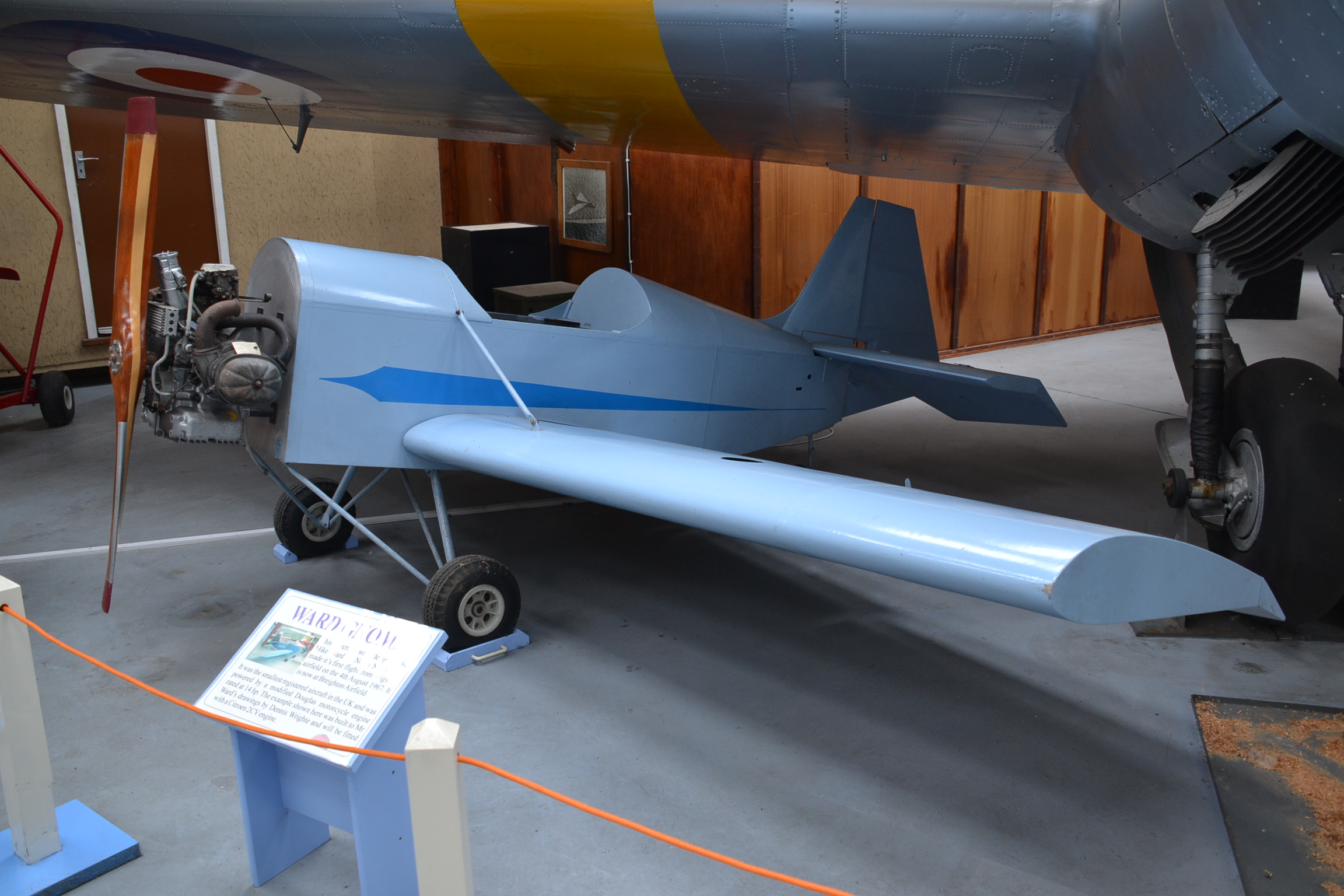
- The unflown Gnome at the Newark Air Museum

General information
- Type: Single seat sports aircraft
- National origin: United Kingdom
- Designer: Michael Ward
- Number built: 1

History
- First flight: 4 August 1967
- Retired: by 1984

The Ward Gnome is a very small single seat sports monoplane, designed for amateur construction in the United Kingdom in the 1960s. Only one is known to have flown.

== Design and development ==
Michael Ward was a carpenter by profession and an enthusiastic aeromodeller. In April 1966 he began the design of an extremely small single-seat aircraft, the Ward P46 (Note: Jane's All the World's Aircraft quotes P46; on the CAA registration form the type is noted as P45.) Gnome, with one of the smallest spans (15 ft 9 in or 4.80 m) of any monoplane. It was intended for home construction.

The Gnome is an all wood low-wing monoplane, each wing braced from above with a slender strut to the upper fuselage longeron. The wood skinned wings, which are straight tapered and built around box spars and D-section leading edges, carry 2° of dihedral. There are wooden ailerons but no flaps.

The fuselage is built around four 3/4 in (19 mm) square longerons, with diagonal bracing and ply formers. The skin is 1/16 in (1.6 mm) ply, with flat surfaces apart from curved decking. There is a single seat open cockpit. The fixed tailwheel undercarriage has each mainwheel mounted on a pair of steel tubes forming a narrow 'V' and fixed under the fuselage. Single bracing struts run forward from the wheel mountings to the lower longerons forward of the wings. Go-Kart wheels and tyres are used, without brakes. A two-cylinder, horizontally opposed 14 horsepower Douglas motorcycle engine, built in 1925 and driving a two blade fixed pitch propeller, was the original powerplant though this may have been replaced later by a Sachs-Wankel motor.

The Gnome flew for the first time on 4 August 1967.

== Operational history ==
The prototype Gnome was sold to a new owner who registered it as G-AXEI in April 1969 and flew it under a Permit to Fly. The registration was cancelled in 1984. At least one other Gnome was partially built, but never flown nor registered.

== Surviving aircraft ==
The prototype, no longer airworthy, is currently with the Real Aeroplane Company at Breighton, East Riding of Yorkshire. The unflown Gnome is on display at the Newark Air Museum, fitted with a Citroen 2CV engine.

== Specifications ==
Data from Jane's All the World's Aircraft 1970-71.

General characteristics

- Capacity: 1
- Length: 11 ft 6 in (3.51 m)
- Wingspan: 15 ft 9 in (4.80 m)
- Height: 4 ft 6 in (1.37 m)
- Wing area: 49 sq ft (4.6 m^{2})
- Empty weight: 210 lb (95 kg)
- Max takeoff weight: 380 lb (172 kg)
- Powerplant: 1 × Douglas air cooled flat twin, 14 hp (10 kW)
- Propellers: 2-bladed fixed pitch

Performance

- Maximum speed: 55 mph (89 km/h, 48 kn) at maximum take-off weight
- Cruise speed: 55 mph (89 km/h, 48 kn)
- Range: 50 mi (80 km, 43 nmi) approximately
- Rate of climb: 300 ft/min (1.5 m/s) approximately
