= Stacey Copeland =

English footballer and boxer (born 1981)

Personal information
- Date of birth: 19 August 1981 (age 45)
- Place of birth: London, England
- Height: 5 ft 6 in (1.68 m)
- Position: Forward

College career
Years	Team	Apps	(Gls)
2005–2007	Lander Bearcats	33	(14)
2008–2009	St. Edward's Hilltoppers		

Senior career*
Years	Team	Apps	(Gls)
1995–1997	Stockport County		
1997–2001	Tranmere Rovers		
2001–2004	Doncaster Rovers Belles		
2010	Vasalund	11	(5)

International career
1999–2000	England U18		
Boxing career
Weight	Light-middleweight
Website	https://www.stacey-copeland.co.uk
Stance	Orthodox
Boxing record
Total fights	5
Wins	5
Win by KO	2
Losses	0
Medal record Women's amateur boxing Representing Great Britain European Championships: Silver medal – second place / 2014 Bucharest / Welterweight
- * Club domestic league appearances and goals

Stacey Copeland (born 19 August 1981) is an English retired professional boxer and former football player who was the inaugural Commonwealth female super-welterweight champion. As an amateur she won a silver medal at the 2014 European Championships. Copeland also teaches PE to female students at Parrs Wood High School.

== Boxing career ==
Copeland made her professional debut on 16 June 2017, scoring a four-round points decision (PTS) victory Borislava Goranova at the Bowlers Exhibition Centre in Manchester, England.

After compiling a record of 4–0 (2 KOs), she faced Mapule Ngubane for the inaugural Commonwealth female super-welterweight title on 13 July 2018 at the International Convention Centre in Harare, Zimbabwe. Copeland defeated Ngubane via unanimous decision (UD) over ten rounds with scores of 98–91, 98–93 and 97–92. With the win, Copeland became the first British female boxer to win a Commonwealth title. She retired in January 2021.

== Professional boxing record ==
5 fights	5 wins	0 losses
By knockout	2	0
By decision	3	0

No.	Result	Record	Opponent	Type	Round, time	Date	Location	Notes
5	Win	5–0	(South Africa) Mapule Ngubane	UD	10	13 Jul 2018	International Convention Centre, Harare, Zimbabwe	Won inaugural Commonwealth female super-welterweight title
4	Win	4–0	(Hungary) Dora Tollar	TKO	1 (6)	2 Mar 2018	(United Kingdom) Bowlers Exhibition Centre, Manchester, England	
3	Win	3–0	(Hungary) Klaudia Vigh	TKO	2 (6), 1:07	4 Nov 2017	(United Kingdom) Bowlers Exhibition Centre, Manchester, England	
2	Win	2–0	(Czech Republic) Ester Konecna	PTS	4	29 Jul 2017	(United Kingdom) Bowlers Exhibition Centre, Manchester, England	
1	Win	1–0	(Bulgaria) Borislava Goranova	PTS	4	16 Jun 2017	(United Kingdom) Bowlers Exhibition Centre, Manchester, England	
