= Karen Elizabeth Carabajal =

Argentinian boxer (born 1989)

- Born: June 24, 1989 (age 37); Buenos Aires, Argentina
- Boxing career
- Height: 5 ft 7 in (170 cm)
- Weight: Lightweight
- Stance: Orthodox

Boxing record
- Total fights: 29
- Wins: 25
- Win by KO: 4
- Losses: 4

Karen Elizabeth Carabajal (born 24 June 1989) is an Argentinian professional boxer. She challenged for the undisputed female lightweight title in 2022. In three separate bouts, Carabajal has also fought for the WBO and IBO female lightweight titles as well as the WBA interim female lightweight championship.

== Professional career ==
=== Carabajal vs. Taylor ===
With a record of 19–0 since turning professional in 2013,, Carabajal challenged undefeated undisputed world female lightweight champion, Katie Taylor, at Wembley Arena in London, England, on 29 October 2022. She lost via unanimous decision (100–91, 99–91, 98–92)

=== Carabajal vs. Dixon ===
On 13 April 2024, Carabajal fought Rhiannon Dixon for the vacant WBO female lightweight title at Manchester Arena in Manchester, England, losing by unanimous decision.

=== Carabajal vs. Dominguez ===
On 6 June 2025, Carabajal secured a ninth round technical knockout victory over Micaela Dominguez to win the vacant WBO Latino female lightweight title.

=== Carabajal vs. Sawa ===
Carabajal faced Pamela Noutcho Sawa for the vacant IBO female lightweight title at Unipol Arena in Casalecchio di Reno in Italy, on 7 November 2025. She knocked her opponent to the canvas in the seventh round but Sawa recovered to finish the fight and won by split decision. Two of the ringside judges favoured Sawa 97–92 and 95–94 respectively, while the third scored the bout 95–94 for Carabajal.

=== Carabajal vs. Mossely ===
Carabajal received another opportunity to capture a world title on 4 July 2026 when she faced off with Estelle Mossely for the vacant WBA interim lightweight title at Palais des Sports Robert Oubron I Créteil, Val-de-Marne, France. She lost via split decision with one judge scoring the contest 96–94 to Carabajal, however, the other two judges scored it 96–94 and 98–92 in favour of Mossely.

== Professional boxing record ==
29 fights	25 wins	4 losses
By knockout	4	0
By decision	20	4
By disqualification	1	0

No.	Result	Record	Opponent	Type	Round, time	Date	Location	Notes
29	Loss	25–4	Estelle Mossely	SD	10	4 Jul 2026	Palais des Sports Robert Oubron, Créteil, Val-de-Marne, France	For vacant WBA interim lightweight title
28	Loss	25–3	Pamela Noutcho Sawa	SD	10	7 Nov 2025	Bologna, Italy	For vacant IBO lightweight title
27	Win	25–2	Micaela Dominguez	TKO	9 (10)	6 Jun 2025	Gimnasio Municipal Enrique Mosconi, Argentina	Won vacant WBO latino female lightweight title
26	Win	24–2	Claudia Andrea Lopez	UD	8	21 Feb 2025	Buenos Aires, Argentina	
25	Win	23–2	Lorena Edith Agoutborde	UD	10	28 Sep 2024	Buenos Aires, Argentina	
24	Loss	22–2	Rhiannon Dixon	UD	10	13 Apr 2024	Manchester Arena, Manchester, England	For vacant WBO lightweight title
23	Win	22–1	Edith Soledad Matthysse	UD	10	10 Feb 2024	Buenos Aires, Argentina	
22	Win	21–1	Lucrecia Anabella Manzur	UD	10	7 Jul 2023	Buenos Aires, Argentina	
21	Win	20–1	Gisela Raquel Avalos	TKO	6 (6)	21 Apr 2023	Buenos Aires, Argentina	
20	Loss	19–1	Katie Taylor	UD	10	29 Oct 2022	Wembley Arena, London, England	For WBA, IBF, WBO, WBC and The Ring lightweight titles
19	Win	19–0	Lorena Edith Agoutborde	UD	6	10 Apr 2022	Buenos Aires, Argentina	
18	Win	18–0	Cintia Gisela Castillo	TKO	10 (10)	23 Oct 2021	Buenos Aires, Argentina	
17	Win	17–0	Flavia Gimena Quintero	TKO	6 (6)	23 Jul 2018	Buenos Aires, Argentina	
16	Win	16–0	Maria Soledad Capriolo	UD	6	21 Mar 2018	Buenos Aires, Argentina	
15	Win	15–0	Cintia Gisela Castillo	UD	10	8 Dec 2017	Buenos Aires, Argentina	
14	Win	14–0	Cintia Gisela Castillo	UD	10	22 Sep 2017	Buenos Aires, Argentina	
13	Win	13–0	Silvia Fernanda Zacarias	UD	6	24 Mar 2017	Buenos Aires, Argentina	
12	Win	12–0	Natalia Vanesa del Valle Aguirre	UD	6	9 Sep 2016	Buenos Aires, Argentina	
11	Win	11–0	Natalia Vanesa del Valle Aguirre	UD	6	23 Apr 2016	Buenos Aires, Argentina	
10	Win	10–0	Silvia Fernanda Zacarias	UD	6	28 Aug 2015	Buenos Aires, Argentina	
9	Win	9–0	Alejandra Soledad Morales	UD	6	1 Aug 2015	Buenos Aires, Argentina	
8	Win	8–0	Noelia Isabel Gutierrez	UD	6	7 Mar 2015	Buenos Aires, Argentina	
7	Win	7–0	Gloria Elena Yancaqueo	DQ	3 (4)	7 Nov 2014	Buenos Aires, Argentina	Yancaqueo disqualified for illegal headbutt
6	Win	6–0	Maria Soledad Capriolo	UD	6	3 Oct 2014	Buenos Aires, Argentina	
5	Win	5–0	Lorena Noemi Gomez	UD	4	19 Jul 2014	Buenos Aires, Argentina	
4	Win	4–0	Johana Estefania Sanchez	UD	6	24 May 2014	Puerto Ibicuy, Argentina	
3	Win	3–0	Lorena Noemi Gomez	UD	4	22 Mar 2014	Buenos Aires, Argentina	
2	Win	2–0	Valeria Vanesa Gramajo	UD	4	27 Sep 2013	Buenos Aires, Argentina	
1	Win	1–0	Vanesa del Valle Calderon	UD	4	17 Aug 2013	Buenos Aires, Argentina	
