= Kristen Fraser =

Scottish boxer

Personal information
- Nickname: TFE
- Nationality: Scottish
- Born: 27 May 1988 (age 38) Aberdeen, Scotland
- Height: 5 ft 3 in (160 cm)
- Weight: Bantamweight; Featherweight

Boxing career
- Stance: Orthodox

Boxing record
- Total fights: 6
- Wins: 6
- Win by KO: 2
- Losses: 0

Kristen Fraser (born 27 May 1988) is a Scottish professional boxer who held the Commonwealth female bantamweight title.

== Professional career ==
Fraser made her professional debut on 31 March 2017, scoring a six-round points decision (PTS) victory Lana Cooper at the DoubleTree by Hilton Hotel in Aberdeen, Scotland.

After compiling a record of 5–0 (1 KO), she faced Ellen Simwaka for the inaugural Commonwealth female bantamweight title on 24 November 2018 at the DoubleTree by Hilton Hotel. Fraser knocked her opponent down in the fourth round en route to a fifth-round stoppage victory via corner retirement (RTD) after Simwaka's corner pulled her out of the fight at the end of the fifth. With the win, Fraser became Scotland's first female to win a Commonwealth title. Fraser vacated the title in November 2019 due to injury.

== Professional boxing record ==
| 6 fights | 6 wins | 0 losses |
|---|---|---|
| By knockout | 2 | 0 |
| By decision | 4 | 0 |

| No. | Result | Record | Opponent | Type | Round, time | Date | Location | Notes |
|---|---|---|---|---|---|---|---|---|
| 6 | Win | 6–0 | (Malawi) Ellen Simwaka | RTD | 5 (10), 2:00 | 24 Nov 2018 | (United Kingdom) DoubleTree by Hilton Hotel, Aberdeen, Scotland | Won inaugural Commonwealth female bantamweight title |
| 5 | Win | 5–0 | (Bulgaria) Roz Mari Silyanova | TKO | 7 (8), 1:53 | 6 Oct 2018 | (United Kingdom) Lagoon Leisure Centre, Paisley, Scotland | |
| 4 | Win | 4–0 | (Czech Republic) Dominika Novotna | PTS | 6 | 1 Sep 2018 | (United Kingdom) DoubleTree by Hilton Hotel, Aberdeen, Scotland | |
| 3 | Win | 3–0 | (Malta) Claire Ciantar | PTS | 6 | 24 Feb 2018 | (United Kingdom) DoubleTree by Hilton Hotel, Aberdeen, Scotland | |
| 2 | Win | 2–0 | (Hungary) Gabriella Mezei | PTS | 4 | 9 Jun 2017 | (United Kingdom) Radisson Blu Hotel, Glasgow, Scotland | |
| 1 | Win | 1–0 | (United Kingdom) Lana Cooper | PTS | 6 | 31 Mar 2017 | (United Kingdom) DoubleTree by Hilton Hotel, Aberdeen, Scotland | |
