= Rima Ayadi =

French boxer (born 1989)

Personal information
- Born: 19 August 1989 (age 36) Paris, France
- Height: 5 ft 8 in (173 cm)

Boxing career

Boxing record
- Wins: 11
- Win by KO: 1
- Losses: 1
- Draws: 0

Rima Ayadi (born 19 August 1989) is a French professional boxer. She is a former WBA interim female super-featherweight champion and a former European champion in the same division.

== Amateur career ==
Ayadi began boxing at the age of 26. She attempted to qualify for the 2024 Summer Olympics, but lost on points to Estelle Mossely.

== Professional career ==
Ayadi turned professional in 2019. On 19 December 2020, she faced Marina Sakharov, winning the bout to became the French super featherweight champion. She then Pasa Malagic for the WBA continental championship, winning the bout to become the continental champion.

In February 2024, at the age of 34, Ayadi won the European super featherweight title by defeating Licia Boudersa.

After she was awarded the WBA interim female super-featherweight championship, Ayadi defended the title against Elif Nur Turhan at the Grand Hotel Barriere in Paris, France, on 28 August 2025. She lost by technical knockout in the sixth round.

== Personal life ==
In 2021, Ayadi founded the Premier Round association, which aims to develop boxing in neighborhoods, particularly among women and young people.

== Professional boxing record ==
| 12 fights | 11 wins | 1 loss |
|---|---|---|
| By knockout | 1 | 1 |
| By decision | 10 | 0 |

| No. | Result | Record | Opponent | Type | Round, time | Date | Location | Notes |
|---|---|---|---|---|---|---|---|---|
| 12 | Loss | 11–1 | Elif Nur Turhan | TKO | 6 (10) | 2025-08-28 | Casino Barrière Enghien-les-Bains, Enghien-les-Bains, France | Lost WBA Interim Female Super Featherweight title |
| 11 | Win | 11–0 | Victoria Bustos | UD | 6 | 2024-12-16 | Casino Barrière Enghien-les-Bains, Enghien-les-Bains, France | Won IBF Inter-Continental Super Featherweight title |
| 10 | Win | 10–0 | Licia Boudersa | UD | 10 | 2024-02-29 | Casino Barrière Enghien-les-Bains, Enghien-les-Bains, France | Won EBU European Female Super Featherweight title |
| 9 | Win | 8–0 | Lucrecia Belen Arrieta | UD | 8 | 2023-06-22 | Cirque Bormann, Paris, France | |
| 8 | Win | 8–0 | Yolis Marrugo | UD | 6 | 2023-02-17 | Salle Wagram, Paris, France | |
| 7 | Win | 7–0 | Olena Medvedenko | UD | 10 | 2022-02-19 | Gymnase Cosec Pablo Neruda, Les Mureaux, France | |
| 6 | Win | 6–0 | Ana Maria Lozano | UD | 10 | 2021-10-30 | Gymnase Cosec Pablo Neruda, Les Mureaux, France | |
| 5 | Win | 5–0 | Pasa Malagic | TKO | 5 (10), 2:00 | 2021-04-03 | Gymnase Cosec Pablo Neruda, Les Mureaux, France | Won WBA Female Continental Super Featherweight title |
| 4 | Win | 4–0 | Marina Sakharov | UD | 8 | 2020-12-19 | Gymnase Cosec Pablo Neruda, Les Mureaux, France | Won French female super featherweight title |
| 3 | Win | 3–0 | Karina Szmalenberg | UD | 6 | 2020-02-29 | Hippodrome, Cabourg, France | |
| 2 | Win | 2–0 | Emma Gongora | UD | 6 | 2020-02-22 | Palais des sports Marcel Cerdan, Levallois-Perret, France | |
| 1 | Win | 1–0 | Ksenija Medic | UD | 6 | 2019-12-19 | Casino de Deauville, Deauville, France | |
