= Anisha Basheel =

Malawian boxer (born 1997)

Personal information
- Nickname: Massacre
- Nationality: Malawian
- Born: Anisha Dzombe Basheel; 1 September 1997 (age 28) Lilongwe, Malawi
- Height: 5 ft 8 in (173 cm)
- Weight: Super-featherweight; Lightweight; Super-lightweight; Welterweight

Boxing career
- Stance: Orthodox

Boxing record
- Total fights: 23
- Wins: 13
- Win by KO: 12
- Losses: 10

Anisha Dzombe Basheel (born 1 September 1997) is a Malawian professional boxer. She was the inaugural Commonwealth female lightweight champion and also held the ABU female super-featherweight title.

== Professional career ==
Basheel made her professional debut on 5 April 2015, suffering a four-round points decision loss to Ruth Chisale at the Robins Park Hall in Blantyre, Malawi.

After losing her first five fights, one by stoppage, a fourth-round technical knockout (TKO) to Lolita Muzeya in November 2015, she defeated Monalisa Sibanda by first-round TKO to score her first professional win. Basheel then won her next five fights, all by stoppage, before facing Consolata Musanga for the inaugural ABU female super-featherweight title on 2 December 2017 at the Carnivore Grounds in Nairobi, Kenya, winning via ninth-round TKO.

For her next fight, Basheel moved up in weight to face Sam Smith on 15 June 2018 at the York Hall, London, for the inaugural Commonwealth female lightweight title. Basheel became the first female to capture a Commonwealth title with a first-round TKO. Basheel dropped her opponent less than 20 seconds after the opening bell; stunning Smith with a solid left hook and following up with two right hands to score the knockdown. Smith rose to her feet to beat the referee's count of ten, only to be on the receiving end of several heavy blows. The end came 1 minute and 10 seconds into the round after a solid jab sent Smith stumbling backwards into the ropes, causing referee Marcus McDonnell to stop the fight.

A year later, Basheel challenged undefeated WBC Silver and former IBO female lightweight champion Chantelle Cameron on 20 July 2019 at the Brentwood Centre in Brentwood, Essex. The fight was a WBC final eliminator with the winner earning a mandatory shot at the WBA, WBC, IBF, and WBO champion Katie Taylor for the undisputed lightweight title. Basheel lost the fight by a shutout unanimous decision with two judges scoring the bout 100–89 and the third scoring it 100–90, all in favour of Cameron.

== Professional boxing record ==
| 23 fights | 13 wins | 10 losses |
|---|---|---|
| By knockout | 12 | 1 |
| By decision | 1 | 9 |

| No. | Result | Record | Opponent | Type | Round, time | Date | Location | Notes |
|---|---|---|---|---|---|---|---|---|
| 23 | Win | 13–10 | (Tanzania) Asha Ngedere | TKO | 5 (8) | 13 Apr 2025 | (Malawi) Bremat Multipurpose Hall, Lilongwe | |
| 22 | Loss | 12–10 | (Democratic Republic of the Congo) Sarah Enduwa | UD | 4 | 28 Jun 2024 | (Democratic Republic of the Congo) Studio Mama Angebi, Kinshasa | |
| 21 | Win | 12–9 | (Malawi) Luckia Ali | TKO | 5 (8) | 26 Dec 2023 | (Malawi) M1 Centre Point, Lilongwe | |
| 20 | Loss | 11–9 | (France) Estelle Mossely | UD | 10 | 17 Feb 2023 | (France) Salle Wagram, Paris | For IBO female lightweight title |
| 19 | Win | 11–8 | (Zimbabwe) Chiedza Homakoma | SD | 6 | 17 Nov 2022 | (South Africa) Durban Casino, Durban | |
| 18 | Win | 10–8 | (South Africa) Kholosa Ndobayini | TKO | 5 (6) | 28 Jul 2022 | (South Africa) The Gallery, Johannesburg | |
| 17 | Loss | 9–8 | (Germany) Ramona Graeff | UD | 6 | 26 Mar 2022 | (United Arab Emirates) Duty Free Tennis Stadium, Dubai | |
| 16 | Win | 9–7 | (Malawi) Luckia Ali | TKO | 3 (6) | 26 Dec 2021 | (Malawi) M1 Centre Point, Lilongwe | |
| 15 | Loss | 8–7 | (Kenya) Sarah Achieng | UD | 10 | 20 Oct 2021 | (Kenya) Charter Hall, NairobI | For vacant Commonwealth female super-lightweight title |
| 14 | Loss | 8–6 | (United Kingdom) Chantelle Cameron | UD | 10 | 20 Jul 2019 | (United Kingdom) Brentwood Centre, Brentwood, Essex | For WBC Silver female lightweight title |
| 13 | Win | 8–5 | (United Kingdom) Sam Smith | TKO | 1 (10), 1:10 | 15 Jun 2018 | (United Kingdom) York Hall, London, England | Won inaugural Commonwealth female lightweight title |
| 12 | Win | 7–5 | (Kenya) Consolata Musanga | TKO | 9 (10) | 2 Dec 2017 | Carnivore Grounds, Nairobi, Kenya | Won vacant ABU female super-featherweight title |
| 11 | Win | 6–5 | (Malawi) Enelless Nkhwanthi | TKO | 6 (6) | 8 Oct 2017 | M1 Centre Point, Lilongwe, Malawi | |
| 10 | Win | 5–5 | (Kenya) Joice Awino | TKO | 3 (6) | 28 May 2017 | M1 Centre Point Lilongwe, Malawi | |
| 9 | Win | 4–5 | (Tanzania) Happy Daudi | KO | 2 (4) | 5 Feb 2017 | National Stadium, Dar es Salaam, Tanzania | |
| 8 | Win | 3–5 | (Malawi) Elizabeth Mota | TKO | 2 (6) | 1 Jan 2017 | M1 Centre Point, Lilongwe, Malawi | |
| 7 | Win | 2–5 | (Tanzania) Asha Ngedere | TKO | 1 (6) | 19 Nov 2016 | Robin's Park, Blantyre, Malawi | |
| 6 | Win | 1–5 | (Zimbabwe) Monalisa Sibanda | TKO | 1 (4) | 30 Oct 2016 | M1 Centre Point, Lilongwe, Malawi | |
| 5 | Loss | 0–5 | (Zambia) Lolita Museya | UD | 8 | 27 Aug 2016 | Government Complex, Lusaka, Zambia | |
| 4 | Loss | 0–4 | (Zambia) Lolita Museya | UD | 8 | 13 May 2016 | Umodzi Conference Centre, Lilongwe, Malawi | |
| 3 | Loss | 0–3 | (Malawi) Ruth Chisale | MD | 4 | 6 Mar 2016 | Lilongwe Community Centre, Lilongwe, Malawi | |
| 2 | Loss | 0–2 | (Zambia) Lolita Muzeya | TKO | 6 | 28 Nov 2015 | National Sports Development Centre, Lusaka, Zambia | |
| 1 | Loss | 0–1 | (Malawi) Ruth Chisale | PTS | 4 | 5 Apr 2015 | Robins Park Hall, Blantyre, Malawi | |
