= List of Commonwealth Boxing Council female champions =

List of Commonwealth Boxing Council female champions is a table showing the Commonwealth female champions certificated by the Commonwealth Boxing Council (CBC). CBC is also affiliated with the WBC.

^{v} — Champion vacated title.
^{r} — Champion retired title.
^{s} — Champion stripped of title.
(n) — where 'n' is the number of occasions the title has been won.

== Featherweight ==
No.	Name	Duration of reign	Defences
1	(Australia) Skye Nicolson	15 October 2022 — present	0

== Bantamweight ==
No.	Name	Duration of reign	Defences
1	(United Kingdom) Kristen Fraser	24 November 2018 — present	0

== Lightweight ==
No.	Name	Duration of reign	Defences
1	(Malawi) Anisha Basheel	15 June 2018 — present	0

== Super lightweight ==
No.	Name	Duration of reign	Defences
1	(United Kingdom) Nina Bradley	15 September 2018 — present	0

== Super welterweight ==
No.	Name	Duration of reign	Defences
1	(United Kingdom) Stacey Copeland	13 July 2018 — present	0

== See also ==
- Commonwealth Boxing Council
- List of Commonwealth Boxing Council champions
