= Leila Beaudoin =

Canadian boxer (born 1996)

Personal information
- Born: 28 March 1996 (age 30) Rivière-du-Loup, Quebec, Canada
- Weight: Super-featherweight

Boxing career
- Stance: Orthodox

Boxing record
- Total fights: 18
- Wins: 16
- Win by KO: 2
- Losses: 2

Leila Beaudoin (born 28 March 1996) is a Canadian professional boxer. She has held the WBA female super-featherweight title since November 2026.

== Career ==
A downhill skier, Beaudoin was introduced to boxing as part of her cardio training. She started boxing with L'École de boxe olympique de Rivière-du-Loup. She had her first competitive bout in May 2013, going on to have a successful amateur career which included winning a national championship.

Beaudoin turned professional in 2019, defeating Tereza Dvorakova by unanimous decision over four rounds in her pro-debut at Complexe Capitale Helicoptere in Quebec City on 25 October that year.

Having amassed a record of 11 wins and one defeat, she faced Lizbeth Crespo for the vacant WBO International female super-featherweight title at Centre Videotron in Quebec City on 17 August 2024, winning the contest via unanimous decision to claim her first championship in the paid ranks.

Beaudoin successfully defended her title at the same venue on 27 June 2025, by stopping former WBC interim female super-featherweight champion, Elhem Mekhaled, in the sixth round.

Beaudoin was scheduled to challenge IBF, WBO and WBA female super-featherweight champion Alycia Baumgardner at the Kaseya Center in Miami, Florida, on the undercard of the Jake Paul vs. Gervonta Davis fight on 14 November 2025. However, the event was cancelled less than two weeks before it was set to take place due Davis' legal issues. The contest was rescheduled to take place at the same venue on 19 December 2025 as part of the undercard of the Jake Paul vs. Anthony Joshua fight. Beaudoin lost the bout, which unlike most women's championship fights was contested over 12 three-minute rounds, by unanimous decision.

Beaudoin faced Paulina Ángel for the vacant interim WBA female super-featherweight title at Théâtre Capitole in Quebec City on 11 June 2026. She won by unanimous decision.

Returning to Théâtre Capitole on 8 October 2026, Beaudoin made a successful first defense of her title with a unanimous decision win over Brisa Alfonzo.

On 18 November 2026, Beaudoin was elevated to full WBA female super-featherweight champion after Alycia Baumgardner vacated the title.
