= Angélique Duchemin =

French boxer (1991–2017)

Personal information
- Nickname: La princesse des rings
- Nationality: French
- Born: 26 June 1991 Thuir, France
- Died: 29 August 2017 (aged 26) Perpignan, France
- Weight: Featherweight; Super-featherweight

Boxing career

Boxing record
- Wins: 14
- Win by KO: 3
- Losses: 0

Angélique Duchemin (26 June 1991 – 29 August 2017) was a French professional boxer known as "La princesse des rings", who competed between 2012 and 2017. She won all 14 of her professional fights, including three by knockout, and became the World Boxing Federation featherweight champion by defeating Ericka Rousseau in 2017.

Duchemin won the EBU European Super Featherweight title against Maria Semertzoglou in 2015, and successfully defended it against Taoussy L'Hadji in 2017. She was also a three-time Federation Francaise de Boxe French Super Feather champion. Duchemin died from an edema in the brain resulting from a heart problem.

== Early life and amateur career ==
Angélique Duchemin was born 26 June 1991 in Thuir, France. Her mother was Gina Duchemin, and her father Joël Duchemin was a boxer. Her brothers also took up boxing. She started training at the Perpignan boxing club at the age of seven.

In her amateur debut, Duchemin faced Marzia Davide over four rounds in the Women's France versus Italy Duals in May 2009, and lost on points. The next month, her second match, this time against Giacoma Cordio, saw her again lose on point, this time after three rounds. In March 2010, her third fight saw her first victory, on points against Sandra Morcet, in the semi-finals of the 2010 French Women's National Championships 57 kg division. Two weeks later, she defeated Maiva Hamadouche on points to take the national title. Duchemin retained the title in 2011, again after defeating Hamadouche on points in the final. Her bid to qualify for the 2012 Summer Olympics was ended at the semi-finals stage of the national trials by Estelle Mossely. In all, Duchemin fought nine times as an amateur, winning six times (including three by knockout) and losing three.

== Professional career ==
In 2012 Duchemin signed a professional contract with the Perpignan boxing club. She undertook her first professional fight in December 2012, beating Cindy Bonhiver on points. In 2013 she won matches against Lourdes Nunez, Cynthia Godbillon and Claudia Ferenczi before claiming the vacant French national super-featherweight title in a unanimous decision against Godbillon. After successfully defending her French title twice in 2015, she won the European super-featherweight title in December of that year by defeating Maria Semertzoglou. In February 2017 she beat Taoussy L'Hadji to retain the title. The wins over Semertzoglou and L'Hadji were both by unanimous decision. A month after the L'Hadji fight, she defeated Ericka Rousseau by unanimous decision to win the vacant World Boxing Federation featherweight title in front of an audience of over 1,000. Rousseau announced her retirement after the match.

Duchemin became ill at her boxing club in Thuir on the evening of 28 August 2017, and received CPR before being taken to hospital in Perpignan. She died on the morning of 29 August 2017. An autopsy determined that the cause of death was an edema in the brain resulting from a heart problem, and also that there was no evidence of either doping or brain damage. She founded the Boxing Club of Thuir. At the time of her death Duchemin was an undefeated French, European and world champion. She had been scheduled to participate in a title match on 12 October.

Her father had died after a heart attack while he was painting boxing ring posts in 2013. The gym that Angélique Duchemin established was given her name, and in 2018 her partner Xavier Gilabert became the trainer there.

== Professional boxing record ==
14 fights	14 wins	0 losses
By knockout	3	0
By decision	11	0
Draws	0	

Angélique Duchemin's professional boxing record
No.	Result	Record	Opponent	Type	Round(s)	Date	Location	Notes
14	Win	14–0–0	Ericka Rousseau	UD	10	12 May 2017	Espace Cordouan, Royan	WBF World Feather (vacant)
13	Win	13–0–0	Taoussy L'Hadji	UD	10	1 April 2017	Salle du P.E.P.S.I., Issoudun	EBU European Super Feather
12	Win	12–0–0	Marianna Gulyas	TKO	4 (6)	30 July 2016	La Palestre, Le Cannet	
11	Win	11–0–0	Taoussy L'Hadji	UD	6	20 May 2016	Palais des Sports Porte de Versailles, Paris XV	
10	Win	10–0–0	Maria Semertzoglou	UD	10	4 December 2015	Palais des Congres, Perpignan	EBU European Super Feather (vacant)
9	Win	9–0–0	Jessica Sanchez	PTS	6	24 October 2015	Gymnase Françoise Spinosi, Montpellier	
8	Win	8–0–0	Cindy Dehoux	PTS	8	25 April 2015	Salle la Luna, Maubeuge	Federation Francaise de Boxe French Super Feather
7	Win	7–0–0	Bilitis Gaucher	TKO	2 (8)	27 March 2015	Stade des Costieres, Nimes	Federation Francaise de Boxe French Super Feather
6	Win	6–0–0	Marianna Gulyas	KO	6	8 March 2014	Salle Rosselo, Thuir	
5	Win	5–0–0	Cynthia Godbillon	UD	8	7 December 2013	Palais des Congres, Perpignan	Federation Francaise de Boxe French Super Feather (vacant)
4	Win	4–0–0	Klaudia Ferenczi	UD	4	26 October 2013	Gymnase Françoise Spinosi, Montpellier	
3	Win	3–0–0	Cynthia Godbillon	PTS	6	25 May 2013	Salle Rosselo, Thuir	
2	Win	2–0–0	Lourdes Nunez	PTS	4	27 April 2013	Port Vendres	
1	Win	1–0–0	Cindy Dehoux	PTS	4	15 December 2012	Palais des Congres, Perpignan	
