= Newark Showground =

Showground in Newark, Nottinghamshire

Coordinates: 53°5′51.94″N 0°46′9.71″W

Newark Showground is a showground in Newark, Nottinghamshire. It makes over a 150 acres (0.61 km^{2}) of the former RAF Winthorpe Airfield which was purchased in 1964 by the Newark and Nottinghamshire Agricultural Society.

== Events ==
=== LAMMA ===
The LAMMA agricultural machinery show is no longer held here. The show is organised by the "Lincolnshire Agricultural Machinery Manufactures Association" and the Newark and Nottinghamshire Agricultural Society, and started in 1981 as a major showcase for the latest agricultural machinery for the local farms. But the event has grown with visitors from all over the British Isles.

In 2012, the LAMMA Show organisation was acquired by the company Briefing Media, the parent company of the trade publication Farmers Guardian.

=== New Wine North and East ===
The site is used for one week of every year by New Wine to run their North and East Festival. New Wine have a permanent storage facility on the site where they keep their equipment throughout the rest of the year.

=== Newark Vintage Tractor and Heritage Show ===
This event is one of the largest Vintage Tractor events in the UK. This event founded in 2002 has grown rapidly. In 2009 the show featured International Harvester as its featured marque and gathered over a hundred examples with several notable ones. These included the First Farmall H tractor built at IH's Doncaster Plant in The UK and the last one built when the factory shut.

=== European Juggling Convention ===
Newark Showground was the venue for the European Juggling Convention in 2019.

=== Stonedead Festival ===
In early 2018, it was announced that a new rock festival, Stonedeaf (now Stonedead), would be held at Newark Showground. The event has since taken place annually, every summer (with the exception of 2020, due to COVID-19 restrictions, when Black Star Riders were due to headline but the festival had to be postponed for a year). The event's stage is named after the late DJ, Tommy Vance. Headlining acts have included: Skid Row, Glenn Hughes, Uriah Heep, Michael Schenker Group, Blue Öyster Cult, Saxon, The Almighty, and Europe.
