= List of European Boxing Union female champions =

The following is a list of European Boxing Union female champions. The European Boxing Union (EBU) is a professional boxing governing body that sanctions championship bouts in Europe.

== Heavyweight ==
Name	Date title won	Successful defences

== Cruiserweight ==
Name	Date title won	Successful defences

== Light-heavyweight ==
Name	Date title won	Successful defences

== Super-middleweight ==
Name	Date title won	Successful defences

== Middleweight ==
Name	Date title won	Successful defences
(Belgium) Femke Hermans	5 December 2020	0

== Super-welterweight ==
Name	Date title won	Successful defences

== Welterweight ==
Name	Date title won	Successful defences
(Switzerland) Ornella Domini	9 November 2013	1
(Poland) Ewa Piątkowska	27 November 2015	0
(Switzerland) Ornella Domini (2)	9 March 2019	1
(United Kingdom) Kirstie Bavington	6 May 2022	1
(United Kingdom) Kirstie Bavington (2)	19 October 2024	0
(France) Emilie Sonvico	26 July 2025	0

== Super-lightweight ==
Name	Date title won	Successful defences
(Belgium) Nathalie Toro	3 April 2004	0
(France) Anne Sophie Mathis	29 October 2009	1
(Denmark) Vinni Skovgaard	21 June 2008	0
(Belgium) Sabrina Giuliani	18 February 2012	2
(France) Farida El Hadrati	5 December 2014	1
(Italy) Silvia Bortot	11 January 2018	1
(France) Victoire Piteau	30 November 2024	0

== Lightweight ==
Name	Date title won	Successful defences
(Belgium) Nathalie Toro	23 March 2007	1
(Belgium) Delfine Persoon	5 March 2011	1
(Switzerland) Nicole Boss	21 December 2013	2
(France) Maïva Hamadouche	21 March 2015	1
(Poland) Ewa Brodnicka	19 December 2015	1
(Poland) Oleksandra Sidorenko	30 September 2017	0
(Spain) Miriam Gutiérrez	22 March 2019	0

== Super-featherweight ==
Name	Date title won	Successful defences
(France) Myriam Chomaz	14 March 2008	1
(Finland) Eva Wahlström	31 March 2012	1
(France) Angelique Duchemin	4 Dec 2015	1
(Norway) Katharina Thanderz	21 October 2017	0
(France) Elhem Mekhaled	22 December 2018	0

== Featherweight ==
Name	Date title won	Successful defences
(Italy) Maria Moroni	2 August 2002	2
(Bulgaria) Galina Koleva Ivanova	22 August 2003	1
(France) Gaelle Amand	14 Dec 2012	0
(France) Stephanie Ducastel	28 February 2015	0
(Belgium) Djemill Gontaruk	13 June 2015	0
(Italy) Vissia Trovato	11 June 2016	0
(France) Licia Boudersa	21 January 2017	0
(Germany) Nina Meinke	17 November 2018	1

== Super-bantamweight ==
Name	Date title won	Successful defences
(Italy) Emanuela Pantani	27 November 2007	0
(France) Karine Rinaldo	7 June 2014	1
(France) Jessica Tamara Vargas	22 April 2016	0
(Netherlands) Jessica Belder	17 October 2016	0
(Denmark) Dina Thorslund	18 March 2017	0
(Spain) Mary Romero	18 January 2020	2
(United Kingdom) Ellie Scotney	29 October 2022	0
(Poland) Laura Grzyb	22 April 2023	1
(Spain) Tania Alvarez	13 April 2024	2

== Bantamweight ==
Name	Date title won	Successful defences
(France) Nadege Szikora	4 July 2009	0
(Spain) Soraya Sanchez	4 June 2010	0
(Spain) Melania Sorroche	16 March 2018	1

== Super-flyweight ==
Name	Date title won	Successful defences
(Russia) Anastasia Toktaulova	6 March 2001	0
(Italy) Maria Rosa Tabusso	29 November 2002	1
(United Kingdom) Ashley Brace	14 April 2018	0
(United Kingdom) Lauren Parker	2 December 2023	0

== Flyweight ==
Name	Date title won	Successful defences
(Ukraine) Alina Shaternikova	26 November 1999	1
(Italy) Stefania Bianchini	5 April 2003	3
(Italy) Simona Galassi	11 May 2007	5
(Italy) Loredana Plazza	13 May 2016	0
(United Kingdom) Chloe Watson	1 December 2023	0
(Poland) Jasmina Zapotoczna	7 March 2025	1

== Light-flyweight ==
Name	Date title won	Successful defences
(Italy) Sonia De Biase	28 November 2003	0
(Romania) Corina Carlescu	24 March 2012	0
(Belgium) Sanae Jah	31 May 2014	0
(France) Laetitia Arzalier	23 May 2015	1
(Italy) Valeria Imbrogno	24 June 2016	0
(Spain) Tatiana Perez	28 November 2025	0

== Strawweight ==
Name	Date title won	Successful defences
(Spain) Joana Pastrana	5 May 2017	1
(Spain) Catalina Diaz	23 March 2019	1
(Spain) Joana Pastrana (2)	16 October 2020	0

== See also ==
- List of European Boxing Union champions
