= List of Japanese boxing world champions =

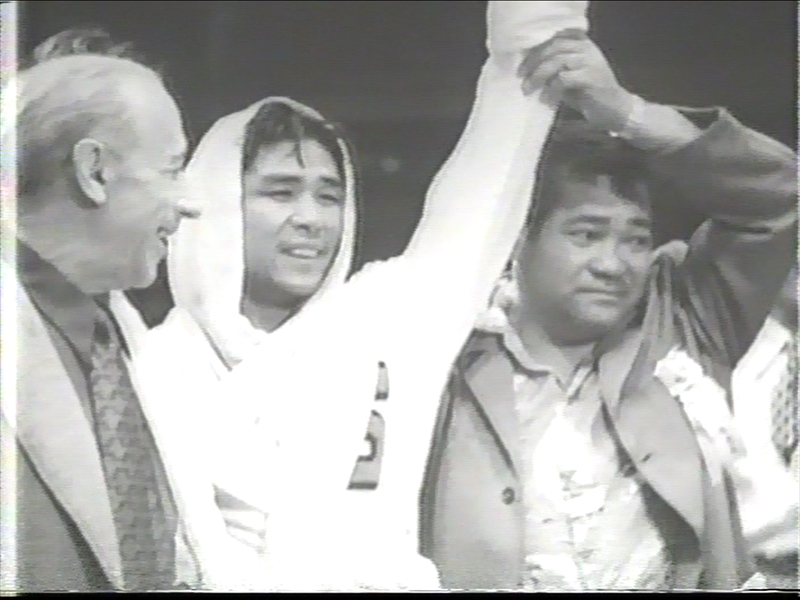
Yoshio Shirai was crowned Japan's first world champion in 1952.

This is a list of Japanese boxing world champions who have won major world titles from the "Big four" governing bodies in professional boxing namely the World Boxing Association (WBA), World Boxing Council (WBC), International Boxing Federation (IBF) and World Boxing Organization (WBO). It was in 1952 that Yoshio Shirai won the world flyweight crown, becoming the first Japanese world champion. Japan ranks fourth worldwide between countries with the most boxing world champions.

The most thriving period of Japan's boxing ran from the 1960s to the early 1970s. In the "golden 60s," Fighting Harada won championships in two divisions—flyweight and bantamweight. In the 1970s, Japan had 5 world champions for a short period at the same time. Notable achievements in that period were Kuniaki Shibata's attainment of 3 world championships in two divisions, Guts Ishimatsu captured the WBC lightweight championship becoming the first Japanese champion in the lightweight division. Koichi Wajima, one of the most popular boxers in Japan for his peculiar "Frog Jump" uppercut punch, also left a big footstep in Japan's boxing history by winning junior middleweight championship 3 times including 6 consecutive title defenses.

== List of men's professional boxing world champions ==
The following is a list of Japanese boxing champions who have held titles from one or more of the "Big Four" organizations (WBA, WBC, IBF, WBO) and The Ring.

WBA has four recognized world champions, Super, Undisputed, Unified, and Regular. The highest tier title is considered the primary champion of the division. Only boxers who are in the primary champion lineage are listed.

The ranking of WBA's primary champions are as follows:

- Super/Undisputed
- Unified
- Regular

Other former international/national-world boxing commissions and organizations from the beginning of boxing are also included here:

- New York State Athletic Commission (NYSAC)
- National Boxing Association (NBA) - changed its name to World Boxing Association (WBA) in 1962

	Inducted into the International Boxing Hall of Fame
	World titles from world and The Ring
	WBA Regular champion
‡	denotes that the WBA Super, Undisputed, and Unified is vacant/vacated during his title reign. The Regular title becomes the primary tile.

No.	Name	Titles	Date	Opponent	Result
1	Yoshio Shirai	NYSAC Flyweight	May 19, 1952	Dado Marino	UD 15/15
1	Yoshio Shirai	NBA Flyweight	May 19, 1952	Dado Marino	UD 15/15
1	Yoshio Shirai	The Ring Flyweight	May 19, 1952	Dado Marino	UD 15/15
2	Fighting Harada	NYSAC Flyweight	Oct 10, 1962	Pone Kingpetch	KO 11/15
2	Fighting Harada	WBA Flyweight	Oct 10, 1962	Pone Kingpetch	KO 11/15
2	Fighting Harada	The Ring Flyweight	Oct 10, 1962	Pone Kingpetch	KO 11/15
2	Fighting Harada	WBA Bantamweight	May 18, 1965	Éder Jofre	SD 15/15
2	Fighting Harada	WBC Bantamweight	May 18, 1965	Éder Jofre	SD 15/15
2	Fighting Harada	The Ring Bantamweight	May 18, 1965	Éder Jofre	SD 15/15
3	Hiroyuki Ebihara	WBA Flyweight	Sep 18, 1963	Pone Kingpetch	KO 1/15
3	Hiroyuki Ebihara	WBC Flyweight	Sep 18, 1963	Pone Kingpetch	KO 1/15
3	Hiroyuki Ebihara	The Ring Flyweight	Sep 18, 1963	Pone Kingpetch	KO 1/15
3	Hiroyuki Ebihara	WBA Flyweight – (2)	Mar 30, 1969	Jose Severino	UD 15/15
4	Takeshi Fuji	WBA Light welterweight	Apr 30, 1967	Sandro Lopopolo	KO 2/15
4	Takeshi Fuji	WBC Light welterweight	Apr 30, 1967	Sandro Lopopolo	KO 2/15
4	Takeshi Fuji	The Ring Light welterweight	Apr 30, 1967	Sandro Lopopolo	KO 2/15
5	Yoshiaki Numata	WBA Super featherweight	Jun 15, 1967	Flash Elorde	MD 15/15
5	Yoshiaki Numata	WBC Super featherweight	Jun 15, 1967	Flash Elorde	MD 15/15
5	Yoshiaki Numata	The Ring Super featherweight	Jun 15, 1967	Flash Elorde	MD 15/15
5	Yoshiaki Numata	WBC Super featherweight – (2)	Apr 5, 1970	Rene Barrientos	SD 15/15
6	Hiroshi Kobayashi	WBA Super featherweight	Dec 14, 1967	Yoshiaki Numata	MD 15/15
6	Hiroshi Kobayashi	WBC Super featherweight	Dec 14, 1967	Yoshiaki Numata	MD 15/15
6	Hiroshi Kobayashi	The Ring Super featherweight	Dec 14, 1967	Yoshiaki Numata	MD 15/15
7	Shozo Saijo	WBA Featherweight	Sep 27, 1968	Raul Rojas	UD 15/15
8	Masao Ohba	WBA Flyweight	Oct 22, 1970	Berkrerk Chartvanchai	TKO 13/15
9	Kuniaki Shibata	WBC Featherweight	Dec 11, 1970	Vincente Saldivar	RTD 12/15
9	Kuniaki Shibata	The Ring Featherweight	Dec 11, 1970	Vincente Saldivar	RTD 12/15
9	Kuniaki Shibata	WBA Super featherweight	Mar 12, 1973	Ben Villaflor	UD 15/15
9	Kuniaki Shibata	The Ring Super featherweight	Mar 12, 1973	Ben Villaflor	UD 15/15
9	Kuniaki Shibata	WBC Super featherweight	Feb 28, 1974	Ricardo Arredondo	UD 15/15
10	Koichi Wajima	WBA Light middleweight	Oct 31, 1971	Carmelo Bossi	SD 15/15
10	Koichi Wajima	WBC Light middleweight	Oct 31, 1971	Carmelo Bossi	SD 15/15
10	Koichi Wajima	The Ring Light middleweight	Oct 31, 1971	Carmelo Bossi	SD 15/15
10	Koichi Wajima	WBA Light middleweight – (2)	Jan 21, 1975	Oscar Albarado	UD 15/15
10	Koichi Wajima	WBC Light middleweight – (2)	Jan 21, 1975	Oscar Albarado	UD 15/15
10	Koichi Wajima	The Ring Light middleweight – (2)	Jan 21, 1975	Oscar Albarado	UD 15/15
10	Koichi Wajima	WBA Light middleweight – (3)	Jan 17, 1976	Yuh Jae-Doo	KO 15/15
11	Guts Ishimatsu	WBC Lightweight	Apr 11, 1974	Rodolfo Gato González	TKO 8/15
12	Shoji Oguma	WBC Flyweight	Oct 1, 1974	Betulio González	SD 15/15
12	Shoji Oguma	WBC Flyweight – (2)	May 18, 1980	Park Chan-Hee	KO 9/15
12	Shoji Oguma	The Ring Flyweight	May 18, 1980	Park Chan-Hee	KO 9/15
13	Susumu Hanagata	WBA Flyweight	Oct 18, 1974	Chartchai Chionoi	TKO 6/15
14	Royal Kobayashi	WBC Super bantamweight	Oct 9, 1976	Rigoberto Riasco	TKO 8/15
15	Yoko Gushiken	WBA Light flyweight	Oct 10, 1976	Juan Antonio Guzmán	KO 7/15
16	Masashi Kudo	WBA Light middleweight	Aug 9, 1978	Eddie Gazo	SD 15/15
16	Masashi Kudo	The Ring Light middleweight	Aug 9, 1978	Eddie Gazo	SD 15/15
17	Shigeo Nakajima	WBC Light flyweight	Jan 3, 1980	Kim Sung-Jun	UD 15/15
18	Yasutsune Uehara	WBA Super featherweight	Aug 2, 1980	Samuel Serrano	KO 6/15
18	Yasutsune Uehara	The Ring Super featherweight	Aug 2, 1980	Samuel Serrano	KO 6/15
19	Tadashi Mihara	WBA Light middleweight	Nov 7, 1981	Rocky Frato	MD 15/15
20	Katsuo Tokashiki	WBA Light flyweight	Dec 16, 1981	Kim Hwan Jin	UD 15/15
21	Jiro Watanabe	WBA Super flyweight	Apr 8, 1982	Rafael Pedroza	UD 15/15
21	Jiro Watanabe	WBC Super flyweight	Nov 29, 1984	Payao Poontarat	UD 12/12
22	Tadashi Tomori	WBC Light flyweight	Apr 13, 1982	Amado Ursúa	UD 12/12
23	Kōji Kobayashi	WBC Flyweight	Jan 18, 1984	Frank Cedeno	TKO 2/12
23	Kōji Kobayashi	The Ring Flyweight	Jan 18, 1984	Frank Cedeno	TKO 2/12
24	Satoshi Shingaki	IBF Bantamweight	Apr 15, 1984	Elmer Magallano	TKO 8/12
25	Tsuyoshi Hamada	WBC Light welterweight	Jul 24, 1986	René Arredondo	KO 1/12
26	Takuya Muguruma	WBA Bantamweight	Mar 29, 1987	Azael Moran	KO 5/12
27	Hiroki Ioka	WBC Mini flyweight	Oct 18, 1987	Mai Thomburifarm	UD 12/12
27	Hiroki Ioka	WBA Light flyweight	Dec 17, 1991	Yuh Myung-Woo	SD 12/12
28	Hideyuki Ohashi	WBC Mini flyweight	Feb 7, 1990	Choi Jum-Hwan	TKO 5/12
28	Hideyuki Ohashi	WBA Mini flyweight	Oct 14, 1992	Choi Hi-Yong	UD 12/12
29	Leopard Tamakuma	WBA Flyweight	Jul 29, 1990	Lee Yul-Woo	TKO 10/12
30	Kiyoshi Hatanaka	WBC Super bantamweight	Feb 3, 1991	Pedro Rubén Décima	TKO 8/12
31	Joichiro Tatsuyoshi	WBC Bantamweight	Sep 19, 1991	Greg Richardson	RTD 10/12
31	Joichiro Tatsuyoshi	WBC Bantamweight – (2)	Nov 22, 1997	Sirimongkol Singwancha	TKO 7/12
32	Katsuya Onizuka	WBA Super flyweight	Apr 10, 1992	Thanomsak Sithbaobay	UD 12/12
33	Akinobu Hiranaka	WBA Light welterweight	Apr 10, 1992	Edwin Rosario	TKO 1/12
34	Yasuei Yakushiji	WBC Bantamweight	Dec 23, 1993	Byun Jung-Il	SD 12/12
35	Hiroshi Kawashima	WBC Super flyweight	May 4, 1994	Jose Luis Bueno	UD 12/12
36	Shinji Takehara	WBA Middleweight	Dec 19, 1995	Jorge Castro	UD 12/12
37	Keiji Yamaguchi	WBA Light flyweight	May 21, 1996	Carlos Murillo	SD 12/12
38	Satoshi Iida	WBA Super flyweight	Dec 23, 1997	Yokthai Sithoar	UD 12/12
39	Takanori Hatakeyama	WBA Super featherweight	Sep 5, 1998	Choi Yong-Soo	UD 12/12
39	Takanori Hatakeyama	WBA Lightweight	Jun 11, 2000	Gilberto Serrano	TKO 8/12
40	Hideki Todaka	WBA Super flyweight	Mar 18, 1999	Jesus Kiki Rojas	UD 12/12
41	Keitaro Hoshino	WBA Mini flyweight	Dec 6, 2000	Joma Gamboa	UD 12/12
41	Keitaro Hoshino	WBA Mini flyweight – (2)	Jan 29, 2002	Joma Gamboa	UD 12/12
42	Celes Kobayashi	WBA Super flyweight	Mar 11, 2001	Leo Gámez	TKO 10/12
43	Yutaka Niida	WBA Mini flyweight	Aug 25, 2001	Chana Porpaoin	UD 12/12
43	Yutaka Niida	WBA Mini flyweight – (2)	Jul 3, 2004	Noel Arambulet	UD 12/12
44	Osamu Sato	WBA Super bantamweight	May 18, 2002	Yoddamrong Sithyodthong	KO 8/12
45	Katsushige Kawashima	WBC Super flyweight	Jun 28, 2004	Masamori Tokuyama	KO 1/12
45	Katsunari Takayama	WBC Mini flyweight	Apr 4, 2005	Isaac Bustos	UD 12/12
45	Katsunari Takayama	IBF Mini flyweight	Mar 30, 2013	Mario Rodríguez	UD 12/12
45	Katsunari Takayama	IBF Mini flyweight – (2)	Dec 31, 2014	Go Odaira	TKO 7/12
45	Katsunari Takayama	WBO Mini flyweight	Dec 31, 2014	Go Odaira	TKO 7/12
45	Katsunari Takayama	WBO Mini flyweight – (2)	Aug 20, 2016	Riku Kano	TD 6/12
46	Hozumi Hasegawa	WBC Bantamweight	Apr 16, 2005	Veeraphol Sahaprom	UD 12/12
46	Hozumi Hasegawa	WBC Featherweight	Nov 26, 2010	Juan Carlos Burgos	UD 12/12
46	Hozumi Hasegawa	WBC Super bantamweight	Sep 16, 2016	Hugo Ruiz	RTD 9/12
47	Takashi Koshimoto	WBC Featherweight	Jan 29, 2006	Chi In-Jin	UD 12/12
48	Nobuo Nashiro	WBA Super flyweight	Jul 22, 2006	Martín Castillo	TKO 10/12
49	Koki Kameda	WBA Light flyweight	Aug 2, 2006	Juan Jose Landaeta	SD 12/12
49	Koki Kameda	WBC Flyweight	Nov 29, 2009	Daisuke Naito	UD 12/12
50	Takefumi Sakata	WBA Flyweight	Mar 19, 2007	Lorenzo Parra	TKO 3/12
51	Daisuke Naito	WBC Flyweight	Jul 18, 2007	Pongsaklek Wonjongkam	UD 12/12
52	Toshiaki Nishioka	WBC Super bantamweight	Jan 3, 2009	Genaro García	TKO 12/12
53	Takahiro Ao	WBC Featherweight	Mar 12, 2009	Óscar Larios	UD 12/12
53	Takahiro Ao	WBC Super featherweight	Nov 26, 2010	Vitali Tajbert	UD 12/12
54	Takashi Uchiyama	WBA (Regular^{‡}) Super featherweight later promoted to Super.	Regular^{‡} Jan 11, 2010	Juan Carlos Salgado	TKO 12/12
54	Takashi Uchiyama	WBA (Regular^{‡}) Super featherweight later promoted to Super.	Super; Feb 15, 2015	Promoted	
55	Daiki Kameda	WBA Flyweight	Feb 7, 2010	Denkaosan Kaovichit	UD 12/12
55	Daiki Kameda	IBF Super flyweight	Sep 3, 2013	Rodrigo Guerrero	UD 12/12
56	Akifumi Shimoda	WBA (Regular^{‡}) Super bantamweight	Jan 31, 2011	Ryol Li Lee	UD 12/12
57	Kazuto Ioka	WBC Mini flyweight	Feb 11, 2011	Oleydong Sithsamerchai	TKO 5/12
57	Kazuto Ioka	WBA Mini flyweight	Jun 20, 2012	Akira Yaegashi	UD 12/12
57	Kazuto Ioka	WBA (Regular^{‡}) Light flyweight	Jan 14, 2014	Primary champion vacant	
57	Kazuto Ioka	WBA (Regular^{‡}) Flyweight	Sep 14, 2016	Primary champion vacant	
57	Kazuto Ioka	WBO Super flyweight	Jun 19, 2019	Aston Palicte	TKO 10/12
57	Kazuto Ioka	WBA Super flyweight	Jun 24, 2023	Joshua Franco	UD 12/12
58	Tomonobu Shimizu	WBA (Regular^{‡}) Super flyweight	Aug 31, 2011	Hugo Cázares	SD 12/12
59	Akira Yaegashi	WBA Mini flyweight	Oct 24, 2011	Pornsawan Porpramook	TKO 10/12
59	Akira Yaegashi	WBC Flyweight	Apr 8, 2013	Toshiyuki Igarashi	UD 12/12
59	Akira Yaegashi	The Ring Flyweight	Apr 8, 2013	Toshiyuki Igarashi	UD 12/12
59	Akira Yaegashi	IBF Light flyweight	Dec 29, 2015	Javier Mendoza	UD 12/12
60	Shinsuke Yamanaka	WBC Bantamweight	Nov 6, 2011	Christian Esquivel	TKO 11/12
61	Yota Sato	WBC Super flyweight	Mar 27, 2012	Suriyan Sor Rungvisai	UD 12/12
62	Toshiyuki Igarashi	WBC Super flyweight	Jul 16, 2012	Sonny Boy Jaro	SD 12/12
62	Toshiyuki Igarashi	The Ring Super flyweight	Jul 16, 2012	Sonny Boy Jaro	SD 12/12
63	Kohei Kono	WBA (Regular^{‡}) Super flyweight	Dec 31, 2012	Tepparith Singwancha	TKO 4/12
63	Kohei Kono	WBA (Regular^{‡}) Super flyweight – (2)	Mar 26, 2014	Denkaosan Kaovichit	KO 8/12
64	Ryo Miyazaki	WBA Mini flyweight	Dec 31, 2012	Pornsawan Porpramook	SD 12/12
65	Takashi Miura	WBC Super featherweight	Apr 8, 2013	Gamaliel Díaz	TKO 9/12
66	Tomoki Kameda	WBO Bantamweight	Aug 1, 2013	Paulus Ambunda	UD 12/12
67	Naoya Inoue	WBC Light flyweight	Apr 6, 2014	Adrián Hernández	TKO 6/12
67	Naoya Inoue	WBO Super flyweight	Dec 12, 2014	Omar Narváez	KO 2/12
67	Naoya Inoue	IBF Bantamweight	May 18, 2019	Emmanuel Rodríguez	TKO 2/12
67	Naoya Inoue	The Ring Bantamweight	May 18, 2019	Emmanuel Rodríguez	TKO 2/12
67	Naoya Inoue	WBA (Super) Bantamweight	Nov 7, 2019	Nonito Donaire	UD 12/12
67	Naoya Inoue	WBC Bantamweight	Jun 7, 2022	Nonito Donaire	TKO 2/12
67	Naoya Inoue	WBO Bantamweight	Dec 14, 2022	Paul Butler	TKO 11/12
67	Naoya Inoue	WBC Super bantamweight	Jul 25, 2023	Stephen Fulton	TKO 8/12
67	Naoya Inoue	WBO Super bantamweight	Jul 25, 2023	Stephen Fulton	TKO 8/12
67	Naoya Inoue	WBA (Super) Super bantamweight	Dec 26, 2023	Marlon Tapales	KO 10/12
67	Naoya Inoue	IBF Super bantamweight	Dec 26, 2023	Marlon Tapales	KO 10/12
67	Naoya Inoue	The Ring Super bantamweight	Dec 26, 2023	Marlon Tapales	KO 10/12
68	Ryoichi Taguchi	WBA (Regular^{‡}) Light flyweight later became Unified champion after winning against IBF champion Milan Melindo.	Regular^{‡} Dec 31, 2014	Alberto Rossel	UD 12/12
68	Ryoichi Taguchi	WBA (Regular^{‡}) Light flyweight later became Unified champion after winning against IBF champion Milan Melindo.	Unified; Dec 31, 2017	Milan Melindo	UD 12/12
68	Ryoichi Taguchi	IBF Light flyweight	Dec 31, 2017	Milan Melindo	UD 12/12
68	Ryoichi Taguchi	The Ring Light flyweight	Dec 31, 2017	Milan Melindo	UD 12/12
69	Kosei Tanaka	WBO Mini flyweight	May 30, 2015	Julian Yedras	UD 12/12
69	Kosei Tanaka	WBO Light flyweight	Dec 31, 2016	Moisés Fuentes	TKO 5/12
69	Kosei Tanaka	WBO Flyweight	Sep 24, 2018	Sho Kimura	MD 12/12
69	Kosei Tanaka	WBO Super flyweight	Feb 24, 2024	Christian Bacasegua	UD 12/12
70	Yu Kimura	WBC Light flyweight	Nov 28, 2015	Pedro Guevara	SD 12/12
71	Yukinori Oguni	IBF Super bantamweight	Dec 31, 2016	Jonathan Guzmán	UD 12/12
72	Tatsuya Fukuhara	WBO Mini flyweight	Feb 26, 2017	Moises Calleros	SD 12/12
73	Daigo Higa	WBC Flyweight	May 20, 2017	Juan Hernández	TKO 6/12
74	Kenshiro Teraji	WBC Light flyweight	May 20, 2017	Ganigan López	MD 12/12
74	Kenshiro Teraji	WBC Light flyweight – (2)	Mar 19, 2022	Masamichi Yabuki	KO 3/12
74	Kenshiro Teraji	WBA Light flyweight	Super Nov 1, 2022	Hiroto Kyoguchi	TKO 7/12
74	Kenshiro Teraji	WBA Light flyweight	Unified; Nov 30, 2022	Status changed	
74	Kenshiro Teraji	The Ring Light flyweight	Nov 1, 2022	Hiroto Kyoguchi	TKO 7/12
74	Kenshiro Teraji	WBC Flyweight	Oct 13, 2024	Cristofer Rosales	TKO 11/12
74	Kenshiro Teraji	WBA Flyweight	Mar 13, 2025	Seigo Yuri Akui	TKO 12/12
74	Kenshiro Teraji	WBO Super flyweight	Jul 20, 2026	Israel González	UD 12/12
75	Hiroto Kyoguchi	IBF Mini flyweight	Jul 23, 2017	Jose Argumedo	UD 12/12
75	Hiroto Kyoguchi	WBA (Super) Light flyweight	Dec 31, 2018	Hekkie Budler	TKO 10/12
75	Hiroto Kyoguchi	The Ring Light flyweight	Dec 31, 2018	Hekkie Budler	TKO 10/12
76	Sho Kimura	WBO Flyweight	Jul 28, 2017	Zhou Shiming	TKO 11/12
77	Ryuya Yamanaka	WBO Mini flyweight	Aug 27, 2017	Tatsuya Fukuhara	UD 12/12
78	Ryosuke Iwasa	IBF Super bantamweight	Sep 13, 2017	Yukinori Oguni	TKO 6/12
79	Masayuki Ito	WBO Super featherweight	Jul 28, 2018	Christopher Díaz	UD 12/12
80	Junto Nakatani	WBO Flyweight	Nov 6, 2020	Giemel Magramo	TKO 8/12
80	Junto Nakatani	WBO Super flyweight	May 20, 2023	Andrew Moloney	KO 12/12
80	Junto Nakatani	WBC Bantamweight	Feb 24, 2024	Alexandro Santiago	TKO 6/12
80	Junto Nakatani	IBF Bantamweight	Jun 8, 2025	Ryosuke Nishida	RTD 6/12
80	Junto Nakatani	The Ring Bantamweight	Jun 8, 2025	Ryosuke Nishida	RTD 6/12
81	Ryōta Murata	WBA (Regular^{‡}) Middleweight later promoted to Super.	Regular^{‡} Jan 1, 2021	Primary champion vacant	
81	Ryōta Murata	WBA (Regular^{‡}) Middleweight later promoted to Super.	Super; Jan 6, 2021	Promoted	
82	Masamichi Yabuki	WBC Light flyweight	Sep 22, 2021	Ken Shiro	TKO 10/12
82	Masamichi Yabuki	IBF Light flyweight	Oct 12, 2024	Sivenathi Nontshinga	TKO 9/12
82	Masamichi Yabuki	IBF Flyweight	Mar 29, 2025	Angel Ayala	TKO 12/12
83	Kenichi Ogawa	IBF Super featherweight	Nov 27, 2021	Azinga Fuzile	UD 12/12
84	Masataka Taniguchi	WBO Mini flyweight	Dec 14, 2021	Wilfredo Méndez	TKO 11/12
85	Takuma Inoue	WBA Bantamweight	Apr 8, 2023	Liborio Solís	UD 12/12
85	Takuma Inoue	WBC Bantamweight	Nov 24, 2025	Tenshin Nasukawa	UD 12/12
86	Ginjiro Shigeoka	IBF Mini flyweight	Oct 7, 2023	Daniel Valladares	TKO 5/12
87	Yudai Shigeoka	WBC Mini flyweight	Oct 7, 2023	Panya Pradabsri	UD 12/12
88	Seigo Yuri Akui	WBA Flyweight	Jan 23, 2024	Artem Dalakian	UD 12/12
89	Ryosuke Nishida	IBF Bantamweight	May 4, 2024	Emmanuel Rodríguez	UD 12/12
90	Yoshiki Takei	WBO Bantamweight	May 6, 2024	Jason Moloney	UD 12/12
91	Shokichi Iwata	WBO Light flyweight	Oct 13, 2024	Jairo Noriega	TKO 3/12
91	Shokichi Iwata	WBC Light flyweight	Mar 15, 2026	Knockout CP Freshmart	TD 9/12
92	Seiya Tsutsumi	WBA Bantamweight	Oct 13, 2024	Takuma Inoue	UD 12/12
93	Kyosuke Takami	WBA Light flyweight	Jul 30, 2025	Erick Rosa	TKO 10/12
94	Daiya Kira	WBA Light flyweight	Sep 2, 2026	Carlos Cañizales	TKO 7/12
95	Ryūsei Matsumoto	WBO Mini flyweight	Nov 2, 2026	Interim promoted	

=== Note ===
- Interim titles are not included unless they get promoted to the official champion.
- For WBA champions, only champions in the WBA primary lineage are listed.

=== List of WBA secondary champions ===
No.	Name	Titles	Reign period	Opponent	Result	Primary champion/s during reign
1	Yusuke Kobori	WBA (Regular) Lightweight (135)	May 19, 2008 – Jan 3, 2009	José Alfaro	TKO 3/12	Nate Campbell; Mar 8, 2008 – Kobori lost the title to Paulus Moses while Campbell was still the primary champion.
2	Nobuo Nashiro	WBA (Regular) Super flyweight	Sep 15, 2008 – May 8, 2010	Martín Castillo	TKO 10/12	Cristian Mijares; May 17, 2008 – Nov 1, 2008
2	Nobuo Nashiro	WBA (Regular) Super flyweight	Sep 15, 2008 – May 8, 2010	Martín Castillo	TKO 10/12	Vic Darchinyan; Nov 1, 2008 – Nashiro lost the title to Hugo Cázares while Darchinyan was still the primary champion.
3	Koki Kameda	WBA (Regular) Bantamweight	Dec 26, 2010 – Dec 6, 2013	Alexander Muñoz	UD 12/12	Anselmo Moreno; Nov 19, 2010 – Kameda vacated the title and chose to move down to super flyweight after the WBA ordered him to fight Moreno.
4	Kazuto Ioka	WBA (Regular) Light flyweight	Dec 31, 2012 – Jan 14, 2014; Becomes primary champion due to vacancy of the title.	José Alfredo Rodríguez	TKO 6/12	Román González; Nov 30, 2012 – Jan 14, 2014
5	Kazuto Ioka (2)	WBA (Regular) Flyweight	Apr 22, 2015 – Sep 14, 2016; Becomes primary champion due to vacancy of the title.	Juan Carlos Reveco	MD 12/12	Juan Estrada; Apr 6, 2013 – Sep 14, 2016
6	Shun Kubo	WBA (Regular) Super bantamweight	Apr 9 – Sep 3, 2017	Nehomar Cermeño	RTD 12/12	Guillermo Rigondeaux; May 14, 2016 – Kubo lost the title to Daniel Roman while Rigondeaux was still the primary champion.
7	Ryōta Murata	WBA (Regular) Middleweight	Oct 22, 2017 – Oct 20, 2018	Hassan N'Dam N'Jikam	RTD 7/12	Gennady Golovkin; Jun 3, 2014 – Sep 15, 2018
7	Ryōta Murata	WBA (Regular) Middleweight	Oct 22, 2017 – Oct 20, 2018	Hassan N'Dam N'Jikam	RTD 7/12	Canelo Alvarez; Sep 15, 2018 – Murata lost the title to Rob Brant while Álvarez was still the primary champion.
8	Naoya Inoue	WBA (Regular) Bantamweight	May 25, 2018 – May 18, 2019; Status changed to Unified champion after winning against IBF champion Emmanuel Rodríguez.	Jamie McDonnell	TKO 1/12	Ryan Burnett; Oct 21, 2017 – Nov 3, 2018
8	Naoya Inoue	WBA (Unified) Bantamweight	May 18 – Nov 7, 2019; Became Super after winning against Super champion Nonito Donaire.	Emmanuel Rodríguez	TKO 2/12	Nonito Donaire; Nov 3, 2018 – Nov 7, 2019
9	Ryōta Murata (2)	WBA (Regular) Middleweight	Jul 12, 2019 – Jan 1, 2021; Becomes primary champion due to vacancy of the title.	Rob Brant	TKO 2/12	Canelo Alvarez; Sep 15, 2018 – Jan 1, 2021
10	Ryūsei Matsumoto	WBA (Regular) Mini flyweight	Sep 14, 2025 – Jun 1, 2026	Yuni Takada	TD 5/12	Oscar Collazo; Nov 16, 2024 – Matsumoto vacated the title to pursue fights beyond sanctioning body constraints.
11	Riku Masuda	WBA (Regular) Bantamweight	Jul 20, 2026 – present	Daigo Higa	SD 12/12	Jesse Rodriguez; Jun 13, 2026 – present
12	Takeshi Ishii	WBA (Regular) Mini flyweight	Sep 2, 2026 – present	Wilfredo Méndez	KO 1/12	Oscar Collazo; Nov 16, 2024 – present

== List of women's professional boxing world champions ==
The following is a list of female Japanese boxing champions who have held titles from one or more of the "Big Four" organizations (WBA, WBC, IBF, WBO) and The Ring.

World titles from world and The Ring

No.	Name	Titles	Date	Opponent	Result
1	Nanako Kikuchi	WBC Mini flyweight	Nov 7, 2005	Nongmai Sor Siriporn	TKO 7/10
2	Naomi Togashi	WBC Light flyweight	Jul 13, 2008	Kim Jin	UD 10/10
3	Momo Koseki	WBC Atomweight	Aug 11, 2008	Chirawadee Srisuk	UD 10/10
3	Momo Koseki	WBA Atomweight	Oct 22, 2015	Ayaka Miyao	UD 10/10
3	Momo Koseki	WBC Mini flyweight	Dec 17, 2017	Yuko Kuroki	UD 10/10
4	Tenkai Tsunami	WBA Super flyweight	Feb 26, 2009	Zhang Xi Yan	SD 10/10
4	Tenkai Tsunami	WBO Light flyweight	Mar 8, 2018	Chaoz Minowa	RTD 8/10
5	Etsuko Tada	WBA Mini flyweight	Apr 11, 2009	Son Cho-Rong	UD 10/10
5	Etsuko Tada	IBF Mini flyweight	Dec 11, 2015	Kareli Lopez	UD 10/10
5	Etsuko Tada	WBO Mini flyweight	Dec 1, 2018	Kayoko Ebata	UD 10/10
5	Etsuko Tada	WBO Mini flyweight – (2)	Dec 3, 2020	Ayaka Miyai	TKO 3/10
6	Naoko Fujioka	WBC Mini flyweight	May 8, 2011	Anabel Ortiz	RTD 8/10
6	Naoko Fujioka	WBA Super flyweight	Nov 13, 2013	Naoko Yamaguchi	UD 10/10
6	Naoko Fujioka	WBO Bantamweight	Oct 19, 2015	Hee Jung Yuh	UD 10/10
6	Naoko Fujioka	WBA Flyweight	Mar 13, 2017	Isabel Millan	TKO 10/10
6	Naoko Fujioka	WBO Light flyweight	Dec 1, 2017	Yokasta Valle	UD 10/10
7	Mari Ando	WBA Atomweight	Sep 22, 2011	Amara Naktaku	UD 10/10
7	Mari Ando	WBC Mini flyweight	Dec 14, 2013	Jasseth Noriega	SD 10/10
8	Naoko Yamaguchi	WBA Super flyweight	Jul 9, 2012	Tenkai Tsunami	UD 10/10
9	Ayaka Miyao	WBA Atomweight	Sep 16, 2012	Mari Ando	UD 10/10
9	Ayaka Miyao	IBF Atomweight	Feb 25, 2022	Eri Matsuda	MD 10/10
10	Shindo Go	WBC Flyweight	May 19, 2013	Renáta Szebelédi	UD 10/10
11	Naoko Shibata	IBF Light flyweight	Nov 14, 2013	Alondra Garcia	UD 10/10
12	Mako Yamada	WBO Mini flyweight	Feb 9, 2014	Hong Su-Yun	SD 10/10
13	Nao Ikeyama	WBO Atomweight	May 17, 2014	Jessebelle Pagaduan	UD 10/10
14	Yuko Kuroki	WBC Mini flyweight	May 17, 2014	Mari Ando	UD 10/10
14	Yuko Kuroki	WBO Atomweight	Sep 1, 2022	Nanae Suzuki	UD 10/10
14	Yuko Kuroki	WBA Atomweight	Aug 5, 2023	Monserrat Alarcón	UD 10/10
14	Yuko Kuroki	WBA Mini flyweight	Jan 21, 2025	Ye Kyeng-Seo	UD 10/10
15	Kumiko Seeser Ikehara	WBO Mini flyweight	Sep 20, 2014	Gretchen Abaniel	SD 10/10
16	Yunoka Furukawa	WBA Atomweight	Aug 13, 2016	Satomi Nishimura	TKO 3/10
17	Nana Yoshikawa	WBO Flyweight	Oct 9, 2016	Lee Eun Hye	MD 10/10
18	Kayoko Ebata	WBO Mini flyweight	May 19, 2017	Erika Hanawa	UD 10/10
19	Mika Iwakawa	WBO Atomweight	Jul 29, 2018	Nao Ikeyama	SD 10/10
19	Mika Iwakawa	IBF Atomweight	Sep 1, 2022	Ayaka Miyao	UD 10/10
21	Saemi Hanagata	IBF Atomweight	Sep 29, 2018	Yuko Kuroki	SD 10/10
22	Kasumi Saeki	WBO Mini flyweight	Apr 27, 2019	Elizabeth Lopez	TKO 6/10
23	Miyo Yoshida	WBO Super flyweight	Jun 19, 2019	Casey Morton	UD 10/10
23	Miyo Yoshida	WBO Super flyweight – (2)	Jun 29, 2021	Tomoko Okuda	SD 10/10
23	Miyo Yoshida	IBF Bantamweight	Dec 9, 2023	Ebanie Bridges	UD 10/10
24	Tamao Ozawa	WBO Super flyweight	May 30, 2022	Miyo Yoshida	SD 10/10
25	Mizuki Hiruta	WBO Super flyweight	Dec 1, 2022	Kanako Taniyama	UD 10/10
26	Sumire Yamanaka	IBF Atomweight	Jan 12, 2024	Mika Iwakawa	UD 10/10

== Current titleholders in world boxing sanctioning bodies ==
=== Major (WBA, WBC, IBF, WBO) ===
==== Men's World Champions ====
Name	Organization	Division	Date won
Naoya Inoue	WBA (Super), WBC, IBF, WBO, and The Ring	Super bantamweight	July 25, 2023
Masamichi Yabuki	IBF	Flyweight	March 29, 2025
Ryūsei Matsumoto	WBA (Regular)	Mini flyweight	September 14, 2025
Shokichi Iwata	WBC	Light flyweight	March 15, 2026

==== Women's World Champions ====
Name	Organization	Division	Date won
Mizuki Hiruta	WBO and The Ring	Super flyweight	December 1, 2022
Yuko Kuroki	WBA	Mini flyweight	January 21, 2025

== See also ==
- List of WBA world champions
- List of WBC world champions
- List of IBF world champions
- List of WBO world champions
- List of IBO world champions
- List of The Ring world champions
- List of undisputed boxing champions
- Boxing in Japan
