= Teeraporn Pannimit =

Thai boxer (born 1992)

Personal information
- Nickname: Teeraporn Pariyakorn Gym
- Born: Teeraporn Pannimit; 10 August 1992 (age 33) Phra Nakhon Si Ayutthaya province, Thailand
- Height: 5 ft 0 in (152 cm)
- Weight: Atomweight; Mini-flyweight; Light-flyweight; Flyweight; Super-flyweight

Boxing career
- Stance: Orthodox

Boxing record
- Total fights: 29
- Wins: 20
- Win by KO: 5
- Losses: 9

Teeraporn Pannimit (Thai: ธีระพร พรรณนิมิตร; born August 10, 1992) is a Thai professional boxer who is a former two-time WBO female mini flyweight champion.

== Boxing career ==
Teeraporn Pannimit became the first WBO female mini flyweight champion when she defeated Eun-Young Huh by unanimous decision on April 2, 2010.

Pannimit made one successful title defense against Jujeath Nagaowa on November 22, 2010, winning by unanimous decision. She was later stripped of the title in 2011.

She unsuccessfully challenged Susi Kentikian for the WBA and WBO female flyweight championships on October 21, 2011. Pannimit lost by unanimous decision.

Pannimit faced Gretchen Abaniel for the vacant WBO title on April 25, 2012. She reclaimed the title by unanimous decision.

Pannimit dropped the title to Su Yun Hong by unanimous decision on June 28, 2012.

== Professional boxing record ==
29 fights	20 wins	9 losses
By knockout	5	2
By decision	15	7

No.	Result	Record	Opponent	Type	Round, time	Date	Location	Notes
29	Loss	20–9	Eva Voraberger	TKO	8 (10), 1:16	26 Sep 2015	Wiener Neudorf, Austria	For WIBF, GBU, and vacant IBO female super-flyweight titles
28	Loss	20–8	Raja Amasheh	UD	10	6 Mar 2015	Bruno Gehrke Halle, Berlin, Germany	For WBC Silver female flyweight title
27	Win	20–7	Benjamat Phakra	PTS	8	4 Dec 2014	Royal Square, Bangkok, Thailand	
26	Win	19–7	Namwan Udomdech	PTS	6	3 Oct 2014	Or Tor Kor Market, Bangkok, Thailand	
25	Win	18–7	Ketkaew Sor Samakkee	PTS	6	19 Jul 2013	Ringping Riverside, Kamphaeng Phet, Thailand	
24	Loss	17–7	Anne-Sophie Da Costa	UD	10	20 Oct 2012	Salle Schmitt, Sedan, France	For vacant WBF female mini-flyweight title
23	Win	17–6	Sumalee Tongpootorn	PTS	6	28 Jul 2012	Royal Square, Bangkok, Thailand	
22	Loss	16–6	Hong Su-yun	UD	10	28 Jun 2012	Grand Waldo Conference & Exhibition Centre, Cotai, China	Lost WBO female mini-flyweight title
21	Win	16–5	Gretchen Abaniel	UD	10	25 Apr 2012	Bung Nam Thao, Thailand	Won vacant WBO female mini-flyweight title
20	Win	15–5	Benjamat Phakra	UD	8	23 Mar 2012	Bangkokthonburi University, Bangkok, Thailand	
19	Loss	14–5	Yessica Chávez	TKO	5 (10), 1:50	14 Jan 2012	Coliseo Olimpico de la UG, Guadalajara, Mexico	For IBF female light-flyweight title
18	Loss	14–4	Susi Kentikian	UD	10	21 Oct 2011	Brandenburg Halle, Frankfurt, Germany	For WBA (Super), WBO, and WIBF female flyweight titles
17	Win	14–3	Benjamat Phakra	PTS	6	25 Apr 2011	Lom Sak, Thailand	
16	Win	13–3	Nucharin Yoohanngoh	TKO	3 (6)	29 Dec 2010	Kaodin Temple, Doem Bang Nang Buat, Thailand	
15	Win	12–3	Jujeath Nagaowa	UD	10	22 Nov 2010	Zeer Rangsit Shopping Center, Rangsit, Thailand	Retained WBO female mini-flyweight title
14	Win	11–3	Noriko Tsunoda	PTS	6	30 Jul 2010	Khemarat, Thailand	
13	Win	10–3	Huh Eun-young	UD	10	2 Apr 2010	Rachanukroh School, Ayutthaya, Thailand	Won vacant WBO female mini-flyweight title
12	Win	9–3	Nongkluay Sor Penprapa	KO	4 (6)	8 Jan 2010	Phu Kamyao, Thailand	
11	Loss	8–3	Momo Koseki	UD	10	29 Nov 2009	Saitama Super Arena, Saitama, Japan	For WBC female atomweight title
10	Win	8–2	Yokdam Kwanjaisrikod	TKO	3 (6)	25 Jul 2009	Omnoi Stadium, Samut Sakhon, Thailand	
9	Win	7–2	Saoyentafour Chor Ekkhunsuk	PTS	6	2 May 2009	Municipal Office of Amphoe Muang, Prachuap Khiri Khan, Thailand	
8	Win	6–2	Nungrudee Sithmanasc	KO	3 (6)	6 Mar 2009	Surin, Thailand	
7	Win	5–2	Petchsurin Nonglamphun	KO	1 (6)	6 Feb 2009	The Office of Pak Hai District, Ayutthaya, Thailand	
6	Win	4–2	Chirawadee Srisuk	UD	6	2 Jan 2009	Rimbung Market, Bangkok, Thailand	
5	Loss	3–2	Marnelle Verano	UD	6	13 Sep 2008	Puerto Princesa Coliseum, Puerto Princesa, Philippines	
4	Win	3–1	Deeday Sor Samakki	PTS	6	25 Aug 2008	Lat Bua Luang, Thailand	
3	Win	2–1	Tukta Pakabbuth	PTS	6	22 May 2008	Kochasith, Nong Khae, Thailand	
2	Win	1–1	O A Lookkaerai	PTS	6	22 Sep 2007	Rajamangala Stadium, Bangkok, Thailand	
1	Loss	0–1	Momo Koseki	UD	6	16 Jun 2007	Rajamangala Stadium, Bangkok, Thailand	
