= Hong Su-yun =

South Korean boxer

Su Yun Hong
Personal information
- Nickname: Haeng-Bok Hong
- Nationality: South Korean
- Born: Choong-Bok Hong; February 9, 1987 (age 39) Hwaseong, South Korea
- Height: 5 ft 3 in (160 cm)
- Weight: Mini flyweight; Light flyweight

Boxing career
- Reach: 63 in (160 cm)
- Stance: Southpaw

Boxing record
- Total fights: 17
- Wins: 15
- Win by KO: 7
- Losses: 1
- Draws: 1

- Hong Su-yun
- Hangul: 홍서연
- RR: Hong Seoyeon
- MR: Hong Sŏyŏn

Hong Su-yun (born February 9, 1987) is a boxer from Seoul, South Korea whose foray into boxing escalated into a series of championship-fighting performances. Eventually, she developed her jabs and counter punches to become a well-rounded fighter and who opts to keep a low profile inside the ring to catch her opponents with their guard down and deploy a strong right uppercut. She became more serious about boxing in 2010, when she signed a contract with her boxing label to become a professional.

== Professional career ==
Hong Su-yun turned professional in 2010 and compiled a record of 7-0 before facing and defeating Thai boxer Teeraporn Pannimit, to win the WBO Mini flyweight title.

== Professional boxing record ==
17 fights	15 wins	1 loss
By knockout	7	0
By decision	8	1
Draws	1	

No.	Result	Record	Opponent	Type	Round, time	Date	Location	Notes
17	Win	15–1–1	(Japan) Tamao Ozawa	SD	10 (10)	2017-05-14	(Japan) KBS Hall, Kyoto	Won vacant WBO Light flyweight title
16	Win	14–1–1	(Philippines) Jujeath Nagaowa	UD	10 (10)	2016-04-29	(South Korea) Chungeui Temple, Yesan	Retained WIBA Light flyweight title
15	Win	13–1–1	(China) Jian Li Liu	TKO	8 (10)	2015-12-27	(South Korea) Jinju Gymnasium, Jinju	Retained WIBA Light flyweight title
14	Win	12–1–1	(Thailand) Kanittha Ninthim	TKO	4 (10)	2015-09-19	(South Korea) Culture Center, Wanju	Retained WIBA Light flyweight title
13	Win	11–1–1	(China) Liu Gao	UD	10 (10)	2014-12-20	(South Korea) Jecheon Gymnasium, Jecheon	Retained WIBA Light flyweight title
12	Win	10–1–1	(China) Ma Li	UD	10 (10)	2014-10-09	(South Korea) Jeongseon Gymnasium, Jeongseon	Won vacant WIBA Light flyweight title
11	Draw	9–1–1	(South Korea) Dan Bi Kim	TD	3 (8)	2014-08-30	(South Korea) Yesan Girls High School, Yesan	
10	Loss	9–1	(Japan) Mako Yamada	SD	10 (10)	2014-02-09	(South Korea) Hoban Gymnasium, Chuncheon	Lost WBO Female Minimumweight title
9	Win	9–0	(Japan) Mari Ando	SD	10 (10)	2013-08-18	(South Korea) Junggu Hall, Seoul	Retained WBO Female Minimumweight title
8	Win	8–0	(Thailand) Thanya Tuyon	TKO	5 (10)	2013-04-27	(South Korea) Saenghwal Gymnasium, Jinju	Retained WBO Female Minimumweight title
7	Win	7–0	(Thailand) Teeraporn Pannimit	UD	10 (10)	2012-06-28	Grand Waldo Conference & Exhibition Centre, Macau	Won WBO Female Minimumweight title
6	Win	6–0	(Thailand) Waranya Yoohanngoh	TKO	4 (10)	2012-04-29	(South Korea) Chungeui Temple, Yesan	Won vacant WIBA Light flyweight title
5	Win	5–0	(Thailand) Benjamat Phakra	TKO	6 (8)	2012-01-15	(South Korea) Yangnam Spa, Gyeongju	
4	Win	4–0	(South Korea) Mi Ran Park	TKO	2 (8)	2011-09-03	(South Korea) Yulha Gymnasium, Gimhae	
3	Win	3–0	(Japan) Yuki Sakurada	TKO	3 (6)	2011-04-29	(South Korea) Chungeui Temple, Yesan	
2	Win	2–0	(South Korea) Hye Soo Park	UD	4 (4)	2010-04-30	(South Korea) Sungkyunkwan University, Suwon	
1	Win	1–0	(South Korea) Ji Sook Kim	UD	4 (4)	2010-01-29	(South Korea) Duwon Engineering College, Anseong	

Sporting positions
Minor world boxing titles
Vacant Title last held by Ju Hee Kim	WIBA Light flyweight title April 29, 2012 – 2012; Vacated	Vacant Title next held by Ju Hee Kim
Vacant Title last held by Ju Hee Kim	WIBA Light flyweight title October 9, 2014 – 2016; Vacated	Vacant
Major world boxing titles
Preceded by Teeraporn Pannimit	WBO Mini flyweight champion June 28, 2012 – February 9, 2014	Succeeded by Mako Yamada
Vacant Title last held by Louisa Hawton	WBO Junior flyweight champion May 14, 2017 – 2017; Vacated	Vacant Title next held by Naoko Fujioka
