= Mari Ando =

Japanese boxer (born 1987)

Mari Ando 安藤麻里
Personal information
- Born: 12 October 1987 (age 38) Hirakata, Osaka, Japan
- Height: 5 ft 0 1/2 in (154 cm)
- Weight: Atomweight; Mini-flyweight; Light-flyweight

Boxing career
- Reach: 63 in (160 cm)
- Stance: Orthodox

Boxing record
- Total fights: 23
- Wins: 13
- Win by KO: 6
- Losses: 10

Mari Andō (安藤麻里, Andō Mari; born 12 October 1987) is a former professional boxer.

== Professional career ==
Ando turned professional in 2008 & compiled a record of 7–3 before defeating Amara Naktaku, to win the inaugural WBA atomweight title. She defended the title once before losing it to Ayaka Miyao. She would attempt to regain the title in a rematch the following year but lost again via unanimous decision.

Ando announced her retirement in 2016 after losing a rematch to Yuko Kuroki for the WBC mini-flyweight title.

== Professional boxing record ==
| 23 fights | 13 wins | 10 losses |
|---|---|---|
| By knockout | 6 | 1 |
| By decision | 7 | 9 |

| No. | Result | Record | Opponent | Type | Round, time | Date | Location | Notes |
|---|---|---|---|---|---|---|---|---|
| 23 | Loss | 13–10 | Yuko Kuroki | UD | 10 | 18 Dec 2016 | Fukuoka Kyuden Kinen Gymnasium, Fukuoka, Japan | For WBC female mini-flyweight title |
| 22 | Win | 13–9 | Tiradee Tipdee | TKO | 3 (8) | 24 Aug 2016 | Shimazu Arena, Kyoto, Japan | |
| 21 | Loss | 12–9 | Ibeth Zamora Silva | TKO | 6 (10), 0:52 | 19 Mar 2016 | Centro de Espectáculos del Recinto Ferial, Metepec, Mexico | For WBC female light-flyweight title |
| 20 | Loss | 12–8 | Cai Zongju | MD | 10 | 18 Sep 2015 | Yageer Gymnasium, Ningbo, China | For WBC International female mini-flyweight title |
| 19 | Win | 12–7 | Jujeath Nagaowa | UD | 6 | 28 Feb 2015 | Azalea Taisho, Osaka, Japan | |
| 18 | Loss | 11–7 | Yuko Kuroki | UD | 10 | 17 May 2014 | Azalea Taisho, Osaka, Japan | Lost WBC female mini-flyweight title |
| 17 | Win | 11–6 | Jasseth Noriega | SD | 10 | 14 Dec 2013 | Azalea Taisho, Osaka, Japan | Won vacant WBC female mini-flyweight title |
| 16 | Loss | 10–6 | Hong Su-yun | SD | 10 | 18 Aug 2013 | Junggu Hall, Seoul, South Korea | For WBO female mini-flyweight title |
| 15 | Loss | 10–5 | Ayaka Miyao | UD | 10 | 24 Jun 2013 | Korakuen Hall, Tokyo, Japan | For WBA female atomweight title |
| 14 | Win | 10–4 | Nucharin Yoohanngoh | TKO | 3 (8) | 9 Feb 2013 | Azalea Taisho, Osaka, Japan | |
| 13 | Loss | 9–4 | Ayaka Miyao | UD | 10 | 16 Sep 2012 | Yomiuri Bunka Hall, Toyonaka, Japan | Lost WBA female atomweight title |
| 12 | Win | 9–3 | Maria del Refugio Jimenez | UD | 10 | 19 Feb 2012 | Yomiuri Bunka Hall, Toyonaka, Japan | Retained WBA female atomweight title |
| 11 | Win | 8–3 | Amara Naktaku | UD | 10 | 22 Sep 2011 | Korakuen Hall, Tokyo, Japan | Won inaugural WBA female atomweight title |
| 10 | Win | 7–3 | Petchnongyao Singvacharachai | TKO | 3 (8) | 24 Jun 2011 | Central Gym, Kobe, Japan | |
| 9 | Win | 6–3 | Wimonrat Palasuksa Krungthep | TKO | 1 (6) | 17 Apr 2011 | Yomiuri Bunka Hall, Toyonaka, Japan | |
| 8 | Win | 5–3 | Mami Ito | MD | 6 | 5 Dec 2010 | ATC Hall, Osaka, Japan | |
| 7 | Loss | 4–3 | Mami Ito | MD | 6 | 24 Sep 2010 | Korakuen Hall, Tokyo, Japan | |
| 6 | Win | 4–2 | Yumi Katayama | TKO | 3 (4) | 16 May 2010 | ATC Hall, Osaka, Japan | |
| 5 | Win | 3–2 | Kalaya Phosuwangym | TKO | 3 (4) | 6 Dec 2009 | ATC Hall, Osaka, Japan | |
| 4 | Win | 2–2 | Schliemann Tamaki | UD | 4 | 23 Aug 2009 | Yomiuri Bunka Hall, Toyonaka, Japan | |
| 3 | Win | 1–2 | Chiho Ueda | MD | 4 | 15 Feb 2009 | Yomiuri Bunka Hall, Toyonaka, Japan | |
| 2 | Loss | 0–2 | Yuri Kobayashi | SD | 4 | 15 Sep 2008 | Yomiuri Bunka Hall, Toyonaka, Japan | |
| 1 | Loss | 0–1 | Sakura Ouchi | UD | 4 | 21 Jul 2008 | Yomiuri Bunka Hall, Toyonaka, Japan | |

== See also ==
- List of female boxers
- Boxing in Japan
- List of Japanese boxing world champions

Sporting positions
World boxing titles
| Inaugural champion | WBA atomweight champion September 22, 2011 – September 16, 2012 | Succeeded by Ayaka Miyao |
| Vacant Title last held by Naoko Fujioka | WBC mini-flyweight champion December 14, 2013 – May 17, 2014 | Succeeded by Yuko Kuroki |
