= Jujeath Nagaowa =

Filipino mixed martial artist and boxer

- Born: Jujeath M. Nagaowa; September 5, 1987 (age 39); Baguio, Philippines
- Other names: Bad Girl
- Nationality: Filipino
- Height: 5 ft 0 in (1.52 m)
- Weight: 105 lb (48 kg; 7.5 st)
- Division: Atomweight
- Reach: 60.0 in (152 cm)
- Style: Boxing, Kickboxing
- Stance: Orthodox

Professional boxing record
- Total: 33
- Wins: 13
- By knockout: 8
- Losses: 19
- By knockout: 4
- Draws: 1

Mixed martial arts record
- Total: 4
- Wins: 4
- By knockout: 2
- By submission: 1
- By decision: 1
- Losses: 0

Other information
- Boxing record from BoxRec
- Mixed martial arts record from Sherdog

Jujeath Nagaowa (born August 5, 1987) is a Filipina mixed martial artist and boxer, who has fought for world titles for International Female Boxers Association and Women's International Boxing Association. As a mixed martial artist, she has competed for WSOF and ONE FC.

== Early life and career ==
Jujeath Nagaowa was born in Baguio, Philippines. Both of her parents were farmers and were separated during her early childhood. She was forced to become independent in her high school days when she lived at her aunt's house. Her career started on physical fitness in losing weight by Muai Thai and Boxing, but she had never been interested in becoming an athlete. In 2006 an invitation of Muai Thai competition in Manila gave Naogawa some inspiration to become an athlete. Later on she chose Boxing as her ideal sport after the first time she won.

On December 19, 2015, Nagaowa will be fighting against Japanese Nao Ikeyama in Colombo, Sri Lanka, for the WBO female atomweight title.

== Professional boxing record ==
33 fights	13 wins	19 losses
By knockout	8	4
By decision	5	15
Draws	1	

No.	Result	Record	Opponent	Type	Round, time	Date	Location	Notes
33	Loss	13–19–1	Erika Hanawa	RTD	4 (8), 2:00	Nov 28, 2018	Korakuen Hall, Tokyo, Japan	For vacant OPBF female mini-flyweight title
32	Loss	13–18–1	Lee Eun-hye	UD	10	Jun 24, 2017	Palma Gymnasium, Suncheon, South Korea	For WIBA flyweight title
31	Loss	13–17–1	Hong Su-yun	UD	10	Apr 29, 2016	Chungeui Temple, Yesan, South Korea	For WIBA light-flyweight title
30	Loss	13–16–1	Nao Ikeyama	UD	10	Dec 19, 2015	Sirasa Stein Studios, Colombo, Sri Lanka	For WBO female atomweight title
29	Win	13–15–1	Luo Yu Jie	UD	10	Jun 6, 2015	Macao Forum, Sé, China	Won WIBA International light-flyweight title
28	Loss	12–15–1	Louisa Hawton	UD	6	May 8, 2015	WA Italian Club, Perth, Australia	
27	Loss	12–14–1	Mari Ando	UD	6	Feb 28, 2015	Azalea Taisho, Osaka, Japan	
26	Loss	12–13–1	Park Ji-hyun	UD	10	Oct 5, 2013	Samsan World Gymnasium, Incheon, South Korea	For IBA female mini-flyweight title
25	Loss	12–12–1	Park Ji-hyun	UD	10	Mar 24, 2013	Weolmyeong Gymnasium, Gunsan, South Korea	For IBA female mini-flyweight title
24	Win	12–11–1	Sumalee Tongpootorn	KO	2 (8)	Oct 28, 2012	Dangjin Gymnasium, Dangjin, South Korea	
23	Loss	11–11–1	Momo Koseki	UD	10	Jun 19, 2012	Korakuen Hall, Tokyo, Japan	For WBC female atomweight title
22	Win	11–10–1	Aisah Alico	TKO	3 (6), 1:55	Feb 18, 2012	La Trinidad Municipal Gymnasium, La Trinidad, Philippines	
21	Win	10–10–1	Sunan Panpracha	TKO	1 (8), 1:47	Sep 22, 2011	Kowloonbay International Trade & Exhibition Centre, Kowloon Bay, China	
20	Loss	9–10–1	Naomi Togashi	TKO	5 (10), 1:32	May 8, 2011	Korakuen Hall, Tokyo, Japan	For WBC female light-flyweight title
19	Loss	9–9–1	Teeraporn Pannimit	UD	10	Nov 22, 2010	Zeer Rangsit Shopping Center, Rangsit, Thailand	For WBO female mini-flyweight title
18	Loss	9–8–1	Kim Ju-hee	MD	10	Sep 12, 2010	Anyang Sports Complex, Anyang, South Korea	For WIBA, WIBF, GBU, and vacant WBF female light-flyweight titles
17	Win	9–7–1	Saemi Hanagata	UD	6	Aug 11, 2010	Korakuen Hall, Tokyo, Japan	
16	Loss	8–7–1	Siriporn Thaweesuk	TKO	4 (10)	May 18, 2010	Tapong Central Market, Rayong, Thailand	For vacant WIBA mini-flyweight title
15	Loss	8–6–1	Go Shindo	TKO	5 (6)	Apr 4, 2010	Prefectural Gymnasium, Wakayama, Japan	
14	Win	8–5–1	Nellie Daw-as	TKO	1 (4), 1:33	Nov 21, 2009	La Trinidad, Philippines	
13	Win	7–5–1	Ailyn Alod	RTD	1 (4), 2:00	Nov 13, 2009	Malolos, Philippines	
12	Win	6–5–1	Baina Londo	UD	6	Feb 21, 2009	San Pablo City Central Stadium, San Pablo, Philippines	
11	Win	5–5–1	Nellie Daw-as	RTD	2 (4), 2:00	Nov 27, 2008	Indang Sports Complex, Indang, Philippines	
10	Loss	4–5–1	Shin Yoon-joo	SD	8	Nov 2, 2008	Yongin Middle School, Yongin, South Korea	
9	Loss	4–4–1	Kanchana Tungthaisong	UD	10	Oct 3, 2008	Nakhon Ratchasima, Thailand	For vacant PABA female light-flyweight title
8	Win	4–3–1	Nellie Daw-as	RTD	2 (4), 2:00	Sep 7, 2008	Elorde Sports Center, Parañaque, Philippines	
7	Loss	3–3–1	Baina Londo	MD	4	Jun 12, 2008	Baras Sports Center, Baras, Philippines	
6	Draw	3–2–1	Baina Londo	SD	4	May 14, 2008	Fortunata Clubhouse, Parañaque, Philippines	
5	Loss	3–2	Geremie Tabastabas	UD	8	Nov 24, 2007	Elorde Sports Center, Parañaque, Philippines	For vacant WIBA Youth light-flyweight title
4	Win	3–1	Karen Canizares	UD	4	Sep 9, 2007	Baguio City Convention Center, Baguio, Philippines	
3	Loss	2–1	Geremie Tabastabas	UD	4	Apr 29, 2007	Plaza Rajah Sulayman, Manila, Philippines	
2	Win	2–0	Baina Londo	UD	4	Aug 26, 2006	Mandaluyong Sports Center, Mandaluyong, Philippines	
1	Win	1–0	Chona Chokowen	TKO	3 (4)	May 18, 2006	Bacarra Gym, Bacarra, Philippines	

== Mixed martial arts record ==
Professional record breakdown
4 matches	4 wins	0 losses
By knockout	2	0
By submission	1	0
By decision	1	0

Res.	Record	Opponent	Method	Event	Date	Round	Time	Location	Notes
Win	4–0	Kannika Bangnara	Submission (rear-naked choke)	Combat FC 1: Inception	June 10, 2018	1	2:35	Hainan, China	
Win	3–0	Yuko Kiryu	Decision (unanimous)	WSOF GC 3	July 30, 2016	3	5:00	Quezon City, Philippines	
Win	2–0	Tharoth Sam	TKO (Punches and Elbows)	ONE FC 23: Warrior's Way	December 5, 2014	2	3:34	Manila, Philippines	
Win	1–0	Jeet Toshi	TKO (Punches)	ONE FC 15: Rise of Heroes	May 2, 2014	2	1:07	Manila, Philippines	
