= Nora Cardoza =

Mexican boxer (born 1984)

Personal information
- Nickname: La Cardoza Norita
- Born: 16 April 1983 (age 43) Parral, Chihuahua, Mexico
- Weight: Atomweight; Mini-flyweight; Light-flyweight; Flyweight; Super-flyweight; Bantamweight; Super-featherweight

Boxing career

Boxing record
- Total fights: 32
- Wins: 17
- Win by KO: 7
- Losses: 13
- Draws: 2

Nora Leticia Cardoza Vazquez (born 16 April 1983) is a Mexican professional boxer. She has challenged for world titles on three occasions; the WBC female atomweight title in 2013; WBA female atomweight title in 2019; and the WBA (Regular) female light flyweight title in December 2020. At regional level she held the NABF female atomweight title in 2014.

== Professional career ==
Cardoza made her professional debut on 23 February 2007, scoring a second-round technical knockout (UD) victory against Magaly Avalos at the Palacio de los Combates in Durango City, Mexico.

After compiling a record of 7–3–2 (4 KO) she fought for her first championship—the vacant WBC Silver female atomweight title—against Ivoon Rosas on 3 May 2013, at the Palenque de la Feria in Durango City. Cardoza lost the bout via ten-round unanimous decision (UD).

She bounced back from defeat with an eight-round UD victory against Claudia Elizalde in August, before challenging reigning champion Momo Koseki for the WBC female atomweight title on 14 November at the Korakuen Hall in Tokyo, Japan. Cardoza failed in her first attempt to capture a world title, losing via UD with two judges scoring the bout 97–91 and the third judge scoring it 96–92.

In her next fight she defeated Lorena Mendoza by fourth-round stoppage via UD to capture the vacant NABF female atomweight title on 17 May 2014, at the Plaza de Toros Alejandra in Durango City.

Following five more wins, two by stoppage, Cardoza challenged Monserrat Alarcón for the WBA female atomweight title on 20 April 2019, at the Plaza Principal in Atotonilco El Alto, Mexico. Cardoza was defeated in her second attempt at a world title, losing via UD with two judges scoring the bout 100–90 and the third judge scored it 99–91.

After a UD defeat against Kim Clavel in June and a TKO victory against Ana Paola Guerva n August, she made a third attempt at a world championship, facing Guadalupe Bautista for the vacant WBA (Regular) female light flyweight title on 12 December 2020, at the Salon de Fiestas Figlos Stase in Culiacán, Mexico. Cardoza suffered the eighth defeat of her career, losing via shutout UD with all three judges scoring the bout 100–90.

== Professional boxing record ==
32 fights	17 wins	13 losses
By knockout	7	4
By decision	10	9
Draws	2	

No.	Result	Record	Opponent	Type	Round, time	Date	Location	Notes
32	Win	17–13–2	Milagros Hernandez Gonzalez	UD	6	13 Sep 2024	Auditorio del Pueblo, Durango City, Mexico	
31	Loss	16–13–2	Jacky Calvo	KO	6 (10), 1:34	9 Nov 2023	Foro 360, Naucalpan, Mexico	For WBA Inter-Continental flyweight title
30	Loss	16–12–2	Gloria Gallardo	UD	8	30 Sep 2023	Rosarito, Mexico	
29	Loss	16–11–2	Marilyn Badillo Amaya	TKO	7 (8), 1:20	15 Apr 2023	Arena Mexico, Guadalajara, Mexico	
28	Loss	16–10–2	Kenia Enríquez	TKO	2 (10), 0:39	28 Oct 2022	Tijuana, Mexico	
27	Win	16–9–2	Itzel Reyes Grijalva	SD	6	30 Sep 2022	Durango City, Mexico	
26	Loss	15–9–2	Guadalupe Bautista	UD	8	13 Nov 2021	Polyforum De La Feria, Torreón, Mexico	
25	Loss	15–8–2	Guadalupe Bautista	UD	10	12 Dec 2020	Salon de Fiestas Figlos Stase, Culiacán, Mexico	For vacant WBA (Regular) female light-flyweight title
24	Win	15–7–2	Ana Paola Guevara	TKO	2 (6), 1:00	24 Aug 2019	Holiday Inn, Durango City, Mexico	
23	Loss	14–7–2	Kim Clavel	UD	8	15 Jun 2019	Centre Gervais Auto, Shawinigan, Quebec, Canada	
22	Loss	14–6–2	Monserrat Alarcón	UD	10	20 Apr 2019	Plaza Principal, Atotonilco El Alto, Mexico	For WBA female atomweight title
21	Win	14–5–2	Janet Ramirez Garcia	UD	4	25 Aug 2018	Holiday Inn, Durango City, Mexico	
20	Win	13–5–2	Karla Islas	TKO	5 (6)	24 Nov 2017	Holiday Inn, Durango City, Mexico	
19	Win	12–5–2	Estrella Hernández	UD	6	5 May 2017	Holiday Inn, Durango City, Mexico	
18	Win	11–5–2	Estrella Hernández	UD	8	17 Apr 2015	Salon del Sindicato De La Alianza, Durango City, Mexico	
17	Win	10–5–2	Lorena Arias	RTD	4 (6), 2:00	6 Mar 2015	Holiday Inn, Durango City, Mexico	
16	Win	9–5–2	Lorena Mendoza	UD	10	17 May 2014	Plaza de Toros, Durango City, Mexico	Won vacant WBC–NABF female atomweight title
15	Loss	8–5–2	Momo Koseki	UD	10	14 Nov 2013	Korakuen Hall, Tokyo, Japan	For WBC female atomweight title
14	Win	8–4–2	Claudia Elizalde	UD	8	24 Aug 2013	Salón Maraca, Tepehuanes, Mexico	
13	Loss	7–4–2	Ivoon Ricas	SD	10	3 May 2013	Palenque de la Feria, Durango City, Mexico	For vacant WBC Silver female atomweight title
12	Win	7–3–2	Zenny Sotomayor	TKO	2 (8)	30 Nov 2012	Durango City, Mexico	
11	Win	6–3–2	Magdalena Leija	PTS	8	21 Sep 2012	Centro de Convenciones Holiday Inn, Durango City, Mexico	
10	Loss	5–3–2	Jasseth Noriega	MD	8	30 Sep 2011	Gimnasio German Evers, Mazatlán, Mexico	
9	Draw	5–2–2	Maricela Quintero	MD	8	25 Jun 2011	Estadio Banorte, Culiacán, Mexico	
8	Loss	5–2–1	Mayela Perez	UD	8	24 Sep 2010	Gimnasio Municipal, Saltillo, Mexico	
7	Win	5–1–1	Flor Verdugo	KO	2 (6), 1:30	13 Aug 2010	Palacio de los Combates, Durango City, Mexico	
6	Loss	4–1–1	Jessica Chávez	KO	2 (6)	10 Apr 2010	Palenque de la Feria, Durango City, Mexico	
5	Draw	4–0–1	Maribel Ramírez	PTS	4	27 Nov 2009	Palacio de los Combates, Durango City, Mexico	
4	Win	4–0	Daniela Campos	TKO	3 (4)	14 Aug 2009	Palacio de los Combates, Durango City, Mexico	
3	Win	3–0	Graciela Niño	UD	4	9 Jun 2007	Arena Naucalpan, Naucalpan, Mexico	
2	Win	2–0	Graciela Niño	UD	4	11 May 2007	Palacio de los Combates, Durango City, Mexico	
1	Win	1–0	Megaly Avalos	TKO	2 (4)	23 Feb 2007	Palacio de los Combates, Durango City, Mexico	

Sporting positions
Regional boxing titles
N/A	NABF female atomweight champion 17 May 2014 – 2015	N/A
