= Etsuko Tada =

Japanese boxer (born 1989)

Etsuko Tada 多田悦子
Personal information
- Born: 28 May 1989 (age 37) Nishinomiya, Japan
- Height: 5 ft 3 1/2 in (161 cm)
- Weight: Atomweight; Mini-flyweight; Light-flyweight

Boxing career
- Reach: 63 in (160 cm)
- Stance: Southpaw

Boxing record
- Total fights: 27
- Wins: 20
- Win by KO: 7
- Losses: 4
- Draws: 3

Etsuko Tada (多田悦子, Tada Etsuko; born 28 May 1989) is a Japanese professional boxer. She is a former four-time mini-flyweight world champion, having held the WBA title from 2009 to 2013; the IBF title from 2015 to 2017; and the WBO title twice between 2018 and October 2021.

== Professional career ==
Tada made her professional debut on 9 May 2008, scoring a six-round unanimous decision (UD) victory against Napaporn Boonchuon at the Korakuen Hall in Tokyo, Japan.

After compiling a record of 4–0 (2 KOs) she captured her first world title, defeating WBA female mini-flyweight champion ChoRong Son via ten-round UD on 11 April 2009 at the Osaka Prefectural Gymnasium in Osaka, Japan. One judge scored the bout 99–91 and the other two scored it 98–92.

Two fights later she faced WBC female light-flyweight champion Naomi Togashi on 6 December 2009 at the ATC Hall in Osaka, with both of their respective titles on the line. After a closely contested fight over ten rounds, both champions retained their titles through a split draw with one judge scoring the bout 97–93 in favour of Tada, another scoring it 96–94 for Togashi, and the third judge scoring it even at 95–95.

Her next fight came against Ria Ramnarine on 24 April 2010 at the Central Indoor Regional Auditorium in Chaguanas, Trinidad and Tobago, with the WIBA interim mini-flyweight title also up for grabs. In a fight which saw Tada suffer a cut from an accidental clash of heads in round six, she retained her title with a second consecutive draw. Two judges scored the bout even at 95–95 while the third judge scored it 97–93 in favour of Ramnarine.

Tada made six successful defences of her WBA title before facing former world champion Anabel Ortiz on 23 July 2013 at the Tokyo Big Sight. Tada suffered the first defeat of her career, losing via split decision (SD) with one judge scoring the bout 97–93 in favour of Tada while the other two scored it 96–94 for Ortiz. Following an eighth-round technical knockout (TKO) victory against Rathsada Sor Worasin in May 2014, Tada suffered her second career defeat against Ortiz in a November rematch, again losing by SD.

She bounced back from this defeat with a sixth-round TKO victory against Chamagorn Sithaithong in April 2015, before facing Kareli Lopez for the vacant IBF female mini-flyweight title on 11 December at the Central Gym in Kobe, Japan. Tada defeated Lopez via UD to capture her second world title, with the judges' scorecards reading 97–93, 96–92, 96–94. Following a TKO victory against Pornpimon Pongpaew in a non-title fight in June 2016, Tada suffered her third defeat, losing her title via SD against Cai Zongju on 30 January 2017 at the Cotai Arena in Macau.

In her next fight she defeated Naoko Shibata on 10 November, capturing the vacant WBO Asia Pacific mini-flyweight title via eight-round UD at the Korakuen Hall, with the judges scorecards reading 80–72, 78–74, and 77–75.

Following this victory, Tada challenged WBO female mini-flyweight champion Kayoko Ebata on 1 December 2018 at the Osaka Prefectural Gymnasium. In a bout which Tada fought with an injured ankle that she picked up during training three weeks prior to the fight, she suffered a knockdown en route to a UD victory to become a three-time mini-flyweight world champion. Two judges scored the bout 98–92 and the third judge scored it 97–93.

Tada vacated her WBO title and moved up in weight in order to pursue a world title in a second division. She defeat Kanyarat Yoohanngoh via TKO in April 2019, with the bout serving as a final eliminator for the WBC female light-flyweight title.

She then moved back down to mini-flyweight in an attempt to become a four-time world champion, facing former champion Ayaka Miyao for the WBO title which Tada had previously vacated. The bout took place on 28 January 2020 at the Korakuen Hall. After ten closely rounds, the fight ended in a split draw to leave the WBO title vacant. One judge scored the bout in favour of Tada with 96–94, the second judge gave the same score in favour of Miyao, while the third judge scored it even at 95–95. The fighters returned to the Korakuen Hall on 3 December for a rematch. Tada would emerge the victor in the second attempt, scoring a TKO with a counter left hook eight seconds into the ninth round, capturing the vacant WBO title to become a four-time world champion. At the time of the stoppage, Tada was ahead on all three judges scorecards with 78–74, 78–74, and 78–75.

== Professional boxing record ==
27 fights	20 wins	4 losses
By knockout	7	0
By decision	13	4
Draws	3	

No.	Result	Record	Opponent	Type	Round, time	Date	Location	Notes
27	Loss	20–4–3	Nguyễn Thị Thu Nhi	UD	10	23 Oct 2021	Wadong Gymnasium, Ansan, South Korea	Lost WBO female mini-flyweight title
26	Win	20–3–3	Ayaka Miyao	TKO	9 (10), 0:08	3 Dec 2020	Korakuen Hall, Tokyo, Japan	Won vacant WBO female mini-flyweight title
25	Draw	19–3–3	Ayaka Miyao	SD	10	28 Jan 2020	Korakuen Hall, Tokyo, Japan	For vacant WBO female mini-flyweight title
24	Win	19–3–2	Duangdawnoi Looksaikongdin	TKO	7 (10), 0:59	27 Apr 2019	Osaka Prefectural Gymnasium, Osaka, Japan	
23	Win	18–3–2	Kayoko Ebata	UD	10	1 Dec 2018	Osaka Prefectural Gymnasium, Osaka, Japan	Won WBO female mini-flyweight title
22	Win	17–3–2	Naoko Shibata	UD	8	10 Nov 2017	Korakuen Hall, Tokyo, Japan	Won vacant WBO Asia Pacific female mini-flyweight title
21	Loss	16–3–2	Cai Zongju	SD	10	30 Jan 2017	Cotai Arena, Cotai, China	Lost IBF female mini-flyweight title
20	Win	16–2–2	Pornpimon Pongpaew	TKO	3 (8), 0:37	17 Jun 2016	Central Gym, Kobe, Japan	
19	Win	15–2–2	Kareli Lopez	UD	10	11 Dec 2015	Central Gym, Kobe, Japan	Won vacant IBF female mini-flyweight title
18	Win	14–2–2	Chamagorn Sithaithong	TKO	6 (8), 1:00	5 Apr 2015	Prefecture Gymnasium, Osaka, Japan	
17	Loss	13–2–2	Anabel Ortiz	SD	10	8 Nov 2014	Auditorio General Arteaga, Querétaro City, Mexico	For WBA female mini-flyweight title
16	Win	13–1–2	Rathsada Sor Worasin	TKO	8 (8), 1:14	25 May 2014	Big Wave, Wakayama, Japan	
15	Loss	12–1–2	Anabel Ortiz	SD	10	23 Jul 2013	Tokyo Big Sight, Tokyo, Japan	Lost WBA female mini-flyweight title
14	Win	12–0–2	Yuko Kuroki	UD	10	3 Mar 2013	Korakuen Hall, Tokyo, Japan	Retained WBA female mini-flyweight title
13	Win	11–0–2	Naoko Shibata	UD	10	16 Sep 2012	Yomiuri Bunka Hall, Toyonaka, Japan	Retained WBA female mini-flyweight title
12	Win	10–0–2	María Salinas	UD	10	19 Feb 2012	Yomiuri Bunka Hall, Toyonaka, Japan	Retained WBA female mini-flyweight title
11	Win	9–0–2	Kanchana Tungthaisong	UD	10	22 Sep 2011	Korakuen Hall, Tokyo, Japan	Retained WBA female mini-flyweight title
10	Win	8–0–2	Ibeth Zamora Silva	UD	10	17 Apr 2011	Yomiuri Bunka Hall, Toyonaka, Japan	Retained WBA female mini-flyweight title
9	Win	7–0–2	Amara Kokietgym	UD	10	5 Dec 2010	ATC Hall, Osaka, Japan	Retained WBA female mini-flyweight title
8	Draw	6–0–2	Ria Ramnarine	MD	10	24 Apr 2010	Central Indoor Regional Auditorium, Chaguanas, Trinidad and Tobago	Retained WBA female mini-flyweight title; For WIBA interim mini-flyweight title
7	Draw	6–0–1	Naomi Togashi	SD	10	6 Dec 2009	ATC Hall, Osaka, Japan	Retained WBA female mini-flyweight title; For WBC female light-flyweight title
6	Win	6–0	Yani Kokietgym	UD	10	23 Aug 2009	Yomiuri Bunka Hall, Toyonaka, Japan	Retained WBA female mini-flyweight title
5	Win	5–0	Son Cho-rong	UD	10	11 Apr 2009	Osaka Prefectural Gymnasium, Osaka, Japan	Won WBA female mini-flyweight title
4	Win	4–0	Kim Hye-min	UD	6	15 Feb 2009	Yomiuri Bunka Hall, Toyonaka, Japan	
3	Win	3–0	Nongnoi Top King Sport	TKO	1 (8), 1:56	5 Oct 2008	KBS Hall, Kyoto, Japan	
2	Win	2–0	Nonlek Sithsornpichai	TKO	1 (8), 0:31	21 Jul 2008	Yomiuri Bunka Hall, Toyonaka, Japan	
1	Win	1–0	Lily Rachaprachagym	UD	6	9 May 2008	Korakuen Hall, Tokyo, Japan	

Sporting positions
Regional boxing titles
Inaugural champion	WBO Asia Pacific female mini-flyweight champion 10 November 2017 – November 2018; Vacated	Vacant Title next held by Kasumi Saeki
World boxing titles
Vacant Title last held by ChoRong Son	WBA female mini-flyweight champion 11 April 2009 – 23 July 2013	Succeeded by Anabel Ortiz
Vacant Title last held by Nancy Franco	IBF female mini-flyweight champion 11 December 2015 – 30 January 2017	Succeeded by Zongju Cai
Preceded by Kayoko Ebata	WBO female mini-flyweight champion 1 December 2018 – April 2019; Vacated	Vacant Title next held by Kasumi Saeki
Vacant Title last held by Kasumi Saeki	WBO female mini-flyweight champion 3 December 2020 – 23 October 2021	Succeeded by Nguyễn Thị Thu Nhi
