= Cai Zongju =

Chinese boxer (born 1991)

Personal information
- Born: 蔡宗菊; 27 September 1991 (age 34) Jinan, Shandong, China
- Height: 5 ft 1 in (155 cm)
- Weight: Minimumweight

Boxing career
- Reach: 61 in (155 cm)
- Stance: Southpaw

Boxing record
- Wins: 11
- Win by KO: 1
- Losses: 1

Cai Zongju (Chinese: 蔡宗菊, born 27 September 1991) is a Chinese former professional boxer. She has held the IBF and IBO female minimumweight titles.

== Biography ==
Scouted by the Chinese state sports system, Cai was sent a sports boarding school and trained in freestyle wrestling before switching to kickboxing, Muay Thai and finally boxing.

She made her professional boxing debut in September 2014, defeating Li Yun Ting in Kunming, China.

Cai challenged IBF female minimumweight champion Etsuko Tada at the Cotai Arena in Macau on 30 January 2017, winning by split decision.

She successfully defended her title via unanimous decision against Gretchen Abaniel at Macau East Asian Games Dome on 28 October 2017, before vacating the championship.

Cai became a two-time world champion by defeating Ana Victoria Polo on a unanimous decision for the vacant IBO female minimumweight title in Haikou, China, on 9 June 2018.

She then switched to amateur boxing and competed for China at the 2019 Women's World Boxing Championships in Russia, where she was eliminated in the quarter-finals.

== Professional boxing record ==
12 fights	11 wins	1 loss
By knockout	1	0
By decision	10	1

No.	Result	Record	Opponent	Type	Round, time	Date	Location	Notes
12	Win	11–1	Ana Victoria Polo	UD	10	9 Jun 2018	Haikou, China	Won vacant IBO female minimumweight title
11	Win	10–1	Gretchen Abaniel	UD	10	28 Oct 2017	Macau East Asian Games Dome, Macau	Retained IBF female minimumweight title
10	Win	9–1	Etsuko Tada	SD	10	30 Jan 2017	Cotai Arena, Macau	Win IBF female minimumweight title
9	Win	8–1	Siriporn Thaweesuk	UD	10	25 May 2016	Diamond Court, Beijing, China	
8	Win	7–1	Debora Rengifo	UD	10	12 Feb 2016	Olympic Park Arena, Luzhou, China	Retained WBC female International minimumweight title
7	Win	6–1	Mari Ando	MD	10	18 Sep 2015	Yageer Gymnasium, Ningbo, China	Retained WBC female International minimumweight title
6	Win	5–1	Angor Onesongchaigym	UD	10	8 May 2015	EXPO Garden Hotel, Kunming, China	Retained WBC female International minimumweight title
5	Win	4–1	Gretchen Abaniel	UD	10	22 Feb 2015	Wenshan, China	Won vacant WBC female International minimumweight title
4	Win	3–1	Ma Li	UD	4	27 Dec 2014	Haikou, China	
3	Win	2–1	Miki Matsumoto	TKO	1 (4), 1:41	30 Nov 2014	Sangyo Hall, Kanazawa, Japan	
2	Loss	1–1	Myna Ketsana	PTS	10	18 Oct 2014	Sawan Vegas Hotel, Savannakhet, Laos	
1	Win	1–0	Li Yun Ting	UD	4	8 Aug 2014	Expo Hall, China Pavilion, Expo Garden, Kunming, China	
