= Siriporn Thaweesuk =

Thai boxer (born 1983)

Samson Sor Siriporn
Personal information
- Nickname: Samson Tor Buamas
- Born: Siriporn Thaweesuk; 26 April 1983 (age 43) Lopburi province, Thailand
- Height: 5 ft 2 in (157 cm)
- Weight: Mini flyweight; Light flyweight; Flyweight

Boxing career
- Stance: Orthodox

Boxing record
- Total fights: 49
- Wins: 43
- Win by KO: 25
- Losses: 6

Siriporn Thaweesuk (often known by her ring names, Samson Sor Siriporn or Samson Tor Buamas) (born 26 April 1983) is a female light-flyweight professional boxer from Lopburi Province, Thailand. She is a former WBC female world light flyweight champion.

Thaweesuk was convicted of selling amphetamines and sentenced to ten years in prison.

Thaweesuk won the title while serving a prison sentence, and was granted an early release from Thai prison after winning a world title, having been promised such prior to her victory. Originally a ten-year sentence, Thaweesuk served seven years.

She defeated Japan's Ayaka Miyao in a title fight for the WBC female light flyweight championship, which was held in a boxing ring in Klong Prem Prison. As a result, she was granted an early release from the Women's Correctional Institute in Pathum Thani.

== Championships and accomplishments ==
- World Boxing Council
  - WBC Female World Light Flyweight Championship (One time, three defenses)
- Women's International Boxing Association
  - WIBA World Mini Flyweight Championship (One time, ten defenses)
  - WIBA International Flyweight Championship (One time)
- Pan Asian Boxing Association
  - PABA Light Flyweight Championship (One time)

== Professional boxing record ==
49 fights	43 wins	6 losses
By knockout	25	1
By decision	18	5

No.	Result	Record	Opponent	Type	Round, time	Date	Location	Notes
49	Loss	43–6	Tenkai Tsunami	UD	10	Jun 10, 2024	Wat Pak Bo School, Bangkok, Thailand	For vacant WBC Silver female mini flyweight title
48	Win	43–5	Boonsita Charoensuk	TKO	1 (6), 1:53	Feb 11, 2024	Singmanasak Muaythai School, Pathum Thani, Thailand	
47	Win	42–5	Chawala Wangarsa	TKO	4 (8), 1:37	Oct 8, 2023	Singmanasak Muaythai School, Pathum Thani, Thailand	
46	Win	41–5	Nomphon Kangkeeree	TKO	3 (8), 1:38	Sep 9, 2023	Singmanasak Muaythai School, Pathum Thani, Thailand	
45	Loss	40–5	Joana Pastrana	TKO	7 (10)	Oct 5, 2018	Pollideportivo Jose Caballero, Alcobendas, Spain	For IBF female mini flyweight title
44	Win	40–4	Nadya Nokhoir	TKO	9 (10), 1:02	Aug 29, 2018	Ao Nang Landmark, Ao Nang, Thailand	Retained WIBA mini flyweight title
43	Win	39–4	Nadya Nokhoir	KO	4 (10), 0:37	Jun 30, 2017	Central Shopping Center, Pattaya, Thailand	Won vacant PABA light flyweight title
42	Win	38–4	Petruampol Sor Thienchai	TKO	1 (6)	Jul 27, 2016	North Eastern University, Khon Kaen, Thailand	
41	Loss	37–4	Cai Zongju	UD	10	May 25, 2016	Diamond Court, Beijing, China	
40	Win	37–3	Marcela Soto	TKO	9 (10)	Oct 28, 2015	Rama IX Chalermprakiat Park, Prae, Thailand	Retained WIBA mini flyweight title
39	Win	36–3	Lady Love Sampiton	KO	1 (10), 1:28	Jul 9, 2015	Sanamluang 2 Market, Bangkok, Thailand	Retained WIBA mini flyweight title
38	Win	35–3	Farung Srithong	TKO	2 (6)	Feb 20, 2015	Ufoo Trade Center, Khon Kaen, Thailand	
37	Win	34–3	Stefel Bernard	KO	4 (10)	Dec 25, 2014	Sanamluang 2 Market, Bangkok, Thailand	
36	Win	33–3	Ellen Meijer	TKO	6 (10)	May 2, 2014	Central Stadium, Ratchaburi, Thailand	Retained WIBA mini flyweight title
35	Win	32–3	Saengmanee Sor Kulawong	UD	6	Mar 27, 2014	Pantainorasing Shrine, Samut Sakhonl, Thailand	
34	Win	31–3	Ying Li	UD	10	Nov 8, 2013	Sanamluang 2 Market, Bangkok, Thailand	Retained WIBA mini flyweight title
33	Win	30–3	Alexis Mary Asher	UD	10	Jul 31, 2013	Ratchasima School, Nakhon Ratchasima, Thailand	Retained WIBA mini flyweight title
32	Win	29–3	Saosukhothai Por Preechagym	UD	6	May 29, 2013	Piboon Witthayalai School, Lopburi, Thailand	
31	Win	28–3	Aisah Alico	KO	3 (10)	Feb 27, 2013	Bangkok University, Thonburi Campus, Bangkok, Thailand	Retained WIBA mini flyweight title
30	Win	27–3	An-an Chor Vachira	TKO	2 (6)	Dec 26, 2012	Wat Samanrattanaram, Chachoengsao, Thailand	
29	Loss	26–3	Nadia Raoui	UD	10	Sep 1, 2012	Rudolf Weber-Arena, Oberhausen, Germany	For WIBA flyweight title
28	Win	26–2	Nongmai Sithsoontorn	TKO	2 (6)	Apr 24, 2012	Samut Sakhon, Thailand	
27	Win	25–2	Li Yun Ting	KO	5 (12)	Jan 20, 2012	Wat Samanrattanaram, Chachoengsao, Thailand	Retained WIBA mini flyweight title
26	Win	24–2	Pantiwa Kaewmahasod	TKO	3 (6)	Nov 18, 2011	Thung Yai, Thailand	
25	Win	23–2	Seab Sithachanmanoh	TKO	4 (6)	Sep 6, 2011	Industrial College, Phanom Sarakham, Thailand	
24	Win	22–2	Sunshine Vidal	KO	3 (10)	Jun 18, 2011	Lamnarai Train Station, Saraburi, Thailand	
23	Win	21–2	Buasawan Wisetchat	PTS	6	May 30, 2011	Khun Tan, Chiang Rai, Thailand	
22	Win	20–2	Gretchen Abaniel	UD	10	Feb 19, 2011	Bangkok University, Thonburi Campus, Bangkok, Thailand	Won vacant WIBA mini flyweight title
21	Win	19–2	Saithong Kwanjaisrikord	TKO	2 (6)	Dec 3, 2010	Klongchan Housing Complex Sport Stadium, Bangkok, Thailand	
20	Win	18–2	San Kim	TKO	5 (6)	Oct 22, 2010	Central Stadium, Phitsanulok, Thailand	
19	Win	17–2	Dalin Liu	UD	10	Jul 28, 2010	Khon Kaen Shoes Warehouse, Khon Kaen, Thailand	Retained WIBA mini flyweight title
18	Win	16–2	Jujeath Nagaowa	TKO	4 (10)	May 18, 2010	Tapong Central Market, Rayong, Thailand	Won vacant WIBA mini flyweight title
17	Win	15–2	Loetizia Campana	TKO	4 (6)	Feb 27, 2010	Bungkum, Bangkok, Thailand	
16	Win	14–2	Yu Jie Luo	UD	10	Jun 17, 2009	Srisatchanalai, Sukhothai, Thailand	Won WIBA International flyweight title
15	Win	13–2	Klara Leiva	TKO	8 (10)	Apr 9, 2010	Bungkum, Bangkok, Thailand	
14	Win	12–2	Nuria Corredera Merino	UD	6	Dec 28, 2008	Fonjang Temporary Stadium, Chonburi, Thailand	
13	Win	11–2	Kayoko Ebata	MD	10	Apr 26, 2008	Phnom Penh, Cambodia	
12	Win	10–2	Momo Koseki	UD	10	Nov 19, 2007	The Mall Shopping Center Ngamwongwan, Bangkok, Thailand	Retained WBC female light flyweight title
11	Win	9–2	Tenshin Anri	UD	12	Aug 15, 2007	The Mall Shopping Center Bangkae, Bangkok, Thailand	Retained WBC female light flyweight title
10	Win	8–2	Ayaka Miyao	UD	10	Apr 3, 2007	Klong Prem Prison, Bangkok, Thailand	Won vacant WBC female light flyweight title
9	Win	7–2	Chirawadee Srisuk	UD	6	Nov 22, 2006	Bang Pakong Wittayayon School, Bang Pakong, Thailand	
8	Win	6–2	Bang-on Kiatruenpetch	PTS	4	Aug 31, 2006	Dhurakij Pundit University, Bangkok, Thailand	
7	Loss	5–2	Nanako Kikuchi	UD	10	May 10, 2006	Klong Prem Prison, Bangkok, Thailand	For WBC female strawweight title
6	Win	5–1	Jinda Sor Amornprakarn	TKO	2 (6)	Mar 20, 2006	Sukhothai Thammathirat University, Muang Thong Thani, Thailand	
5	Win	4–1	Maliwan Pathompothong	UD	6	Mar 10, 2006	Rachabhak University, Phetchaburi, Thailand	
4	Win	3–1	Rungfah Sithpavan	TKO	1 (6)	Jan 30, 2006	Taladthai Market, Pathum Thani, Thailand	
3	Win	2–1	Pornsanan Por Burabha	UD	4	Jan 14, 2006	Airforce Officer Monument, Bangkok, Thailand	
2	Loss	1–1	Lookpla Sakmontri	UD	4	Dec 5, 2005	Amphoe Muang, Pathum Thani, Thailand	
1	Win	1–0	Maneenil Por Sirisuek	UD	4	Nov 7, 2005	Central Correctional Institute, Pathum Thani, Thailand	

== Kickboxing record ==
Professional Kickboxing Record
Date	Result	Opponent	Event	Location	Method	Round	Time
2024-07-26	Loss	(Japan) Koyuki Miyazaki	RISE 180	Tokyo, Japan	TKO (Referee stoppage)	2	0:43
Legend: Win Loss Draw/No contest Notes
