= Monserrat Alarcón =

Mexican boxer (born 1994)

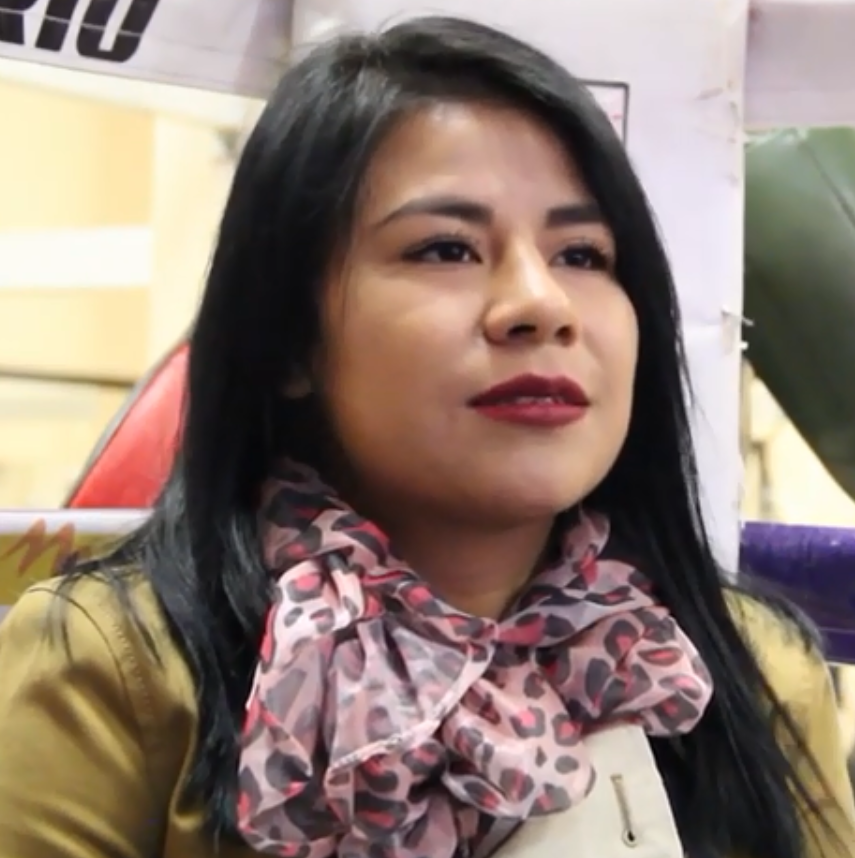

Personal information
- Nickname: Raya
- Nationality: Mexican
- Born: 7 March 1994 (age 32)
- Weight: Atomweight; Mini-flyweight; Light-flyweight; Flyweight

Boxing career
- Stance: Orthodox

Boxing record
- Total fights: 30
- Wins: 19
- Win by KO: 0
- Losses: 8
- Draws: 3

Monserrat Alarcón (Spanish pronunciation: [monseˈrat alaɾˈkon]; born 7 March 1994) is a Mexican professional boxer. She is a former world champion in two weight classes, having held the WBA female light minimumweight title from 2018 to 2023 and the WBO female flyweight title from 2017 to 2018.

== Professional career ==
Alarcón made her professional debut on 3 November 2012, scoring a four-round unanimous decision (UD) victory against Perla Perez at the Foro Polanco in Mexico City, Mexico.

After compiling a record of 5–2–1, she faced Brenda Ramos for the vacant Mexican female minimumweight title on 25 March 2015 at the Arena El Jefe in Monterrey, Mexico. Alarcón defeated Ramos, capturing her first professional title via UD over ten rounds. The first defence of her title came six months later against Mitzi Rodriguez on 12 September in Mexico City. Alarcón retained her title through a second-round technical draw after both fighters suffered cuts from an accidental clash of heads.

Following a UD win against Ana Cristina Vargas in a non-title fight in April 2016, she faced former foe Alondra Garcia for the vacant WBC Youth female light flyweight title on 4 June at the Gimnasio Usos Múltiples UdeG in Guadalajara, Mexico. Alarcón suffered the third defeat of her career, losing by majority decision (MD) over ten rounds. Two judges scored the bout 98–94 and 96–94 in favour of Garcia while the third scored it even at 95–95.

In her next fight she successfully defended her Mexican title in a rematch with Brenda Ramos in October before challenging WBO female flyweight champion, Nana Yoshikawa, on 29 April 2017 at the Big-i in Sakai, Japan. In a fight which saw Alarcón drop Yoshikawa twice, once in the opening round and again in the fourth, the bout came to an end in the seventh after Yoshikawa received a cut from an accidental clash of heads and was deemed unable to continue. With the result resting on the scorecards, Alarcón won by unanimous technical decision (TD) with scores of 70–62, 69–63 and 68–64. After a UD win in a non-title fight against Yesenia Martinez Castrejon in December, she made the first defence of her title against former two-time world champion Arely Muciño on 17 February 2018 at the Domo del Parque San Rafael in Guadalajara. Alarcón lost her title via MD, with two judges scoring the bout 99–91 and 98–92 in favour of Muciño while the third scored it even at 95–95.

For her next fight she dropped down in weight to face Mayela Perez for the vacant WBA female atomweight title on 31 August 2018 at the Arena Pavillón del Norte in Saltillo, Mexico. Alarcón captured her second world title in as many weight classes, defeating Perez via UD with two judges scoring the bout 96–94 and the third scoring it 99–91.

Alarcón lost her title on 5 August 2023, suffering a majority decision defeat to WBO champion Yuko Kuroki at Central Gym, Kobe, Japan. Two judges scored the fight 96-94 for the Japanese boxer with the third ruling it a 95–95 tie.

== Professional boxing record ==
28 fights	19 wins	6 losses
By decision	19	6
Draws	3	

No.	Result	Record	Opponent	Type	Round, time	Date	Location	Notes
28	Draw	19–6–3	Abril Sanchez	PTS	6	20 Jun 2025	Ciudad Nezahualcóyotl, Mexico	
27	Loss	19–6–2	Anabel Ortiz	UD	10	31 Aug 2024	Foro Oceanía Show Center, Mexico City, Mexico	
26	Win	19–5–2	Cecilia Mendoza	UD	8	27 Oct 2023	Salon Marbet Plus, Ciudad Nezahualcóyotl, Mexico	
25	Loss	18–5–2	Yuko Kuroki	MD	10	5 Aug 2023	Central Gym, Kobe, Japan	Lost WBA female atomweight title; For WBO female atomweight title
24	Win	18–4–2	Brenda Balderas Martinez	UD	10	30 Sep 2022	Auditorio BB, Mexico City, Mexico	Retained WBA female atomweight title
23	Win	17–4–2	Silvia Torres	MD	10	4 Dec 2021	Palenque de la Faria, León, Mexico	Retained WBA female atomweight title
22	Win	16–4–2	Tania Garcia Hernandez	UD	8	28 Aug 2021	Parque La Ruina, Hermosillo, Mexico	
21	Win	15–4–2	Esmeralda Torres Ramirez	UD	8	26 Dec 2020	Salon Marbet Plus, Ciudad Nezahualcóyotl, Mexico	
20	Win	14–4–2	Itzayana Cruz Delgado	UD	8	30 Oct 2020	Salon Marbet Plus, Ciudad Nezahualcóyotl, Mexico	
19	Win	13–4–2	Ayaka Miyao	SD	10	12 Sep 2019	Korakuen Hall, Tokyo, Japan	Retained WBA female atomweight title
18	Win	12–4–2	Nora Cardoza	UD	10	20 Apr 2019	Plaza Principal, Atotonilco El Alto, Mexico	Retained WBA female atomweight title
17	Win	11–4–2	Mayela Perez	UD	10	31 Aug 2018	Arena Pavillón del Norte, Saltillo, Mexico	Won vacant WBA female atomweight title
16	Loss	10–4–2	Arely Muciño	MD	10	17 Feb 2018	Domo del Parque San Rafael, Guadalajara, Mexico	Lost WBO female flyweight title
15	Win	10–3–2	Yesenia Martinez Castrejon	UD	8	2 Dec 2017	Domo del Parque San Rafael, Guadalajara, Mexico	
14	Win	9–3–2	Nana Yoshikawa	TD	7 (10), 0:04	29 Apr 2017	Big-i, Sakai, Japan	Won WBO female flyweight title; Fight stopped after Yoshikawa cut from accidental head clash
13	Win	8–3–2	Brenda Ramos	SD	10	28 Oct 2016	Gimnasio Polifuncional Ana Gabriela Guevara, Hermosillo, Mexico	Retained Mexican female mini-flyweight title
12	Loss	7–3–2	Alondra Garcia	MD	10	4 Jun 2016	Gimnasio Usos Múltiples UdeG, Guadalajara, Mexico	For WBC Youth female light-flyweight title
11	Win	7–2–2	Ana Cristina Vargas	UD	8	29 Apr 2016	Salon Marbet Plus, Ciudad Nezahualcóyotl, Mexico	
10	Draw	6–2–2	Mitzi Rodriguez	TD	2 (10), 0:19	12 Sep 2015	Mexico City, Mexico	Retained Mexican female mini-flyweight title; Fight stopped after both fighters cut from accidental head clash
9	Win	6–2–1	Brenda Ramos	UD	10	25 Mar 2015	Arena El Jefe, Monterrey, Mexico	Won vacant Mexican female mini-flyweight title
8	Win	5–2–1	Guadalupe Bautista	PTS	6	20 Dec 2014	Jose Cuervo Salon, Mexico City, Mexico	
7	Win	4–2–1	Maria Goreti	UD	4	17 Jul 2014	Jose Cuervo Salon, Mexico City, Mexico	
6	Loss	3–2–1	Alondra Garcia	MD	6	10 May 2014	Arena Solidaridad, Monterrey, Mexico	
5	Loss	3–1–1	Ana Victoria Polo	SD	4	11 Oct 2013	Jose Cuervo Salon, Mexico City, Mexico	
4	Win	3–0–1	Elizabeth Munoz Guadarrama	UD	4	17 Aug 2013	Auditorio Plaza Condesa, Mexico City, Mexico	
3	Draw	2–0–1	Nayeli Verde	PTS	4	13 Apr 2013	Foro Polanco, Mexico City, Mexico	
2	Win	2–0	Lorena Mendoza	UD	4	26 Jan 2013	Foro Polanco, Mexico City, Mexico	
1	Win	1–0	Perla Perez	UD	4	3 Nov 2012	Foro Polanco, Mexico City, Mexico	
