= Ayaka Miyao =

Japanese boxer (born 1983)

Personal information
- Born: 29 August 1983 (age 43) Chikuma, Nagano, Japan
- Height: 5 ft 0 1/2 in (154 cm)
- Weight: Atomweight; Mini-flyweight; Light-flyweight

Boxing career
- Reach: 59 1/2 in (151 cm)
- Stance: Orthodox

Boxing record
- Total fights: 37
- Wins: 25
- Win by KO: 6
- Losses: 10
- Draws: 2

Ayaka Miyao is a Japanese retired professional boxer. She is a former two-time female atomweight world champion, having held the IBF and the WBA titles during her career.

== Professional boxing record ==
| 37 fights | 25 wins | 10 losses |
|---|---|---|
| By knockout | 6 | 4 |
| By decision | 19 | 6 |
| Draws | 2 | |

| No. | Result | Record | Opponent | Type | Round, time | Date | Location | Notes |
|---|---|---|---|---|---|---|---|---|
| 37 | Loss | 25–10–2 | Mika Iwakawa | UD | 10 | 1 Sep 2022 | Korakuen Hall, Tokyo, Japan | Lost IBF female atomweight title |
| 36 | Win | 25–9–2 | Eri Matsuda | MD | 10 | 25 Feb 2022 | Korakuen Hall, Tokyo, Japan | Won vacant IBF female atomweight title |
| 35 | Win | 24–9–2 | Kaori Nagai | UD | 8 | 22 Sep 2021 | Korakuen Hall, Tokyo, Japan | |
| 34 | Loss | 23–9–2 | Etsuko Tada | TKO | 9 (10), 0:08 | 3 Dec 2020 | Korakuen Hall, Tokyo, Japan | For vacant WBO female mini-flyweight title |
| 33 | Draw | 23–8–2 | Etsuko Tada | SD | 10 | 28 Jan 2020 | Korakuen Hall, Tokyo, Japan | For vacant WBO female mini-flyweight title |
| 32 | Loss | 23–8–1 | Monserrat Alarcón | SD | 10 | 12 Sep 2019 | Korakuen Hall, Tokyo, Japan | For WBA female atomweight title |
| 31 | Win | 23–7–1 | Nao Ikeyama | UD | 10 | 20 Nov 2018 | Korakuen Hall, Tokyo, Japan | Won WBA interim female atomweight title |
| 30 | Win | 22–7–1 | Aisah Alico | TKO | 4 (6), 1:17 | 7 Jun 2018 | Korakuen Hall, Tokyo, Japan | |
| 29 | Loss | 21–7–1 | Nao Ikeyama | TKO | 6 (10), 0:36 | 13 Dec 2016 | Korakuen Hall, Tokyo, Japan | For WBO female atomweight title |
| 28 | Win | 21–6–1 | Krikanok Islandmuaythai | TKO | 4 (8), 1:10 | 10 Apr 2016 | City Culture Hall, Sōka, Japan | |
| 27 | Loss | 20–6–1 | Momo Koseki | UD | 10 | 22 Oct 2015 | Korakuen Hall, Tokyo, Japan | Lost WBA female atomweight title; For WBC female atomweight title |
| 26 | Win | 20–5–1 | Momoko Kanda | UD | 6 | 5 Mar 2015 | Korakuen Hall, Tokyo, Japan | |
| 25 | Win | 19–5–1 | Satomi Nishimura | KO | 10 (10), 1:58 | 25 Oct 2014 | Tokura Gym, Chikuma, Japan | Retained WBA female atomweight title |
| 24 | Win | 18–5–1 | Saowaluk Nareepangsri | TKO | 8 (10), 1:39 | 7 Aug 2014 | Korakuen Hall, Tokyo, Japan | |
| 23 | Win | 17–5–1 | Thanya Tuyon | KO | 5 (10), 1:30 | 3 Mar 2014 | Korakuen Hall, Tokyo, Japan | Retained WBA female atomweight title |
| 22 | Win | 16–5–1 | Gretchen Abaniel | UD | 10 | 28 Nov 2013 | Korakuen Hall, Tokyo, Japan | Retained WBA female atomweight title |
| 21 | Win | 15–5–1 | Mari Ando | UD | 10 | 24 Jun 2013 | Korakuen Hall, Tokyo, Japan | Retained WBA female atomweight title |
| 20 | Win | 14–5–1 | Masae Akitaya | UD | 10 | 26 Feb 2013 | Korakuen Hall, Tokyo, Japan | Retained WBA female atomweight title |
| 19 | Win | 13–5–1 | Mari Ando | UD | 10 | 16 Sep 2012 | Yomiuri Bunka Hall, Toyonaka, Japan | Won WBA female atomweight title |
| 18 | Win | 12–5–1 | Masae Akitaya | UD | 8 | 19 Feb 2012 | Yomiuri Bunka Hall, Toyonaka, Japan | |
| 17 | Win | 11–5–1 | Mika Oda | UD | 6 | 11 Jul 2011 | Korakuen Hall, Tokyo, Japan | |
| 16 | Win | 10–5–1 | Mami Ito | TKO | 6 (6), 1:15 | 21 Apr 2011 | Korakuen Hall, Tokyo, Japan | |
| 15 | Win | 9–5–1 | Yuri Kobayashi | UD | 4 | 15 Dec 2010 | Korakuen Hall, Tokyo, Japan | |
| 14 | Win | 8–5–1 | Nahoko Tanaka | UD | 4 | 24 Sep 2010 | Korakuen Hall, Tokyo, Japan | |
| 13 | Loss | 7–5–1 | Naoko Shibata | UD | 4 | 5 Feb 2010 | Bunka Gym, Yokohama, Japan | |
| 12 | Win | 7–4–1 | Mami Ito | UD | 4 | 17 Mar 2009 | Korakuen Hall, Tokyo, Japan | |
| 11 | Win | 6–4–1 | Chikako Aikawa | UD | 4 | 10 Dec 2008 | Bunka Gym, Yokohama, Japan | |
| 10 | Win | 5–4–1 | Kumiko Nishida | SD | 4 | 29 Sep 2008 | Korakuen Hall, Tokyo, Japan | |
| 9 | Loss | 4–4–1 | Tenkai Tsunami | KO | 2 (8) | 24 Jun 2007 | Shinjuku Face, Tokyo, Japan | |
| 8 | Loss | 4–3–1 | Siriporn Thaweesuk | UD | 10 | 3 Apr 2007 | Klong Prem Central Prison, Bangkok, Thailand | For vacant WBC female light-flyweight title |
| 7 | Win | 4–2–1 | Gypsy Taeko | PTS | 6 | 12 Feb 2007 | Tokyo, Japan | |
| 6 | Loss | 3–2–1 | Mayumi Kubo | MD | 4 | 15 Dec 2006 | Tokyo, Japan | |
| 5 | Loss | 3–1–1 | Nao Ikeyama | KO | 4 (8) | 30 Apr 2006 | Orange Hall, Okayama, Japan | For JWBC female mini-flyweight title |
| 4 | Draw | 3–0–1 | Etsuyo Yagihashi | PTS | 6 | 15 Aug 2005 | Nagano, Japan | |
| 3 | Win | 3–0 | Sho Moriyama | SD | 4 | 12 Jun 2005 | Kitazawa Town Hall, Tokyo, Japan | |
| 2 | Win | 2–0 | Erika Irie | UD | 4 | 5 Nov 2004 | Kyoto, Japan | |
| 1 | Win | 1–0 | Erika Irie | UD | 4 | 18 Sep 2004 | Kyoto, Japan | |
