= Saemi Hanagata =

Japanese boxer (born 1984)

Personal information
- Nationality: Japanese
- Born: Satomi Tanaka 田中冴美; 28 October 1984 (age 41) Yokohama, Kanagawa Prefecture, Japan
- Weight: Atomweight; Mini-flyweight; Light-flyweight

Boxing career
- Stance: Orthodox

Boxing record
- Total fights: 28
- Wins: 16
- Win by KO: 7
- Losses: 7
- Draws: 5

Satomi Tanaka (田中冴美, born 13 August 1984), better known as Saemi Hanagata, is a Japanese professional boxer who formerly held the IBF female atomweight title.

== Professional career ==
Hanagata made her professional debut on 12 August 2008, losing by unanimous decision (UD) over four rounds against Yu Koshiishi at the Korakuen Hall in Tokyo, Japan. All three judges scored the bout 39–38.

After compiling a record of 7–2–1 (3 KOs), she challenged WBC female atomweight champion, Momo Koseki, on 17 December 2012 at the Korakuen Hall. Hanagata suffered the third defeat of her career, losing by UD over ten rounds with two judges scoring the bout 96–94 and the third scoring it 98–92.

Three fights later she faced Yuko Kuroki, who she had defeated six months earlier, for the vacant OPBF female minimumweight title on 3 December 2013 at the Korakuen Hall. The bout ended in a split draw over eight rounds, with one judge scoring it 77–76 in favour of Hanagata, another scoring it 77–76 to Kuroki while the third scored it even at 77–77. She captured the vacant OPBF title in her second attempt four months later on 11 March 2014, defeating Satomi Nishimura via fifth-round technical knockout (TKO) at the Korakuen Hall.

She lost the title by majority decision (MD) in her first defence against Mika Oda in September, before challenging IBF female junior-flyweight champion, Naoko Shibata, on 19 February 2015 at the Korakuen Hall. Hanagata lost by MD in her first attempt at a world title, with two judges scoring the bout 96–95 and 96–94 in favour of Shibata while the third scored it even at 95–95.

After bouncing back from defeat with two wins, one by stoppage, she faced Mika Oda in a rematch for the OPBF title on 1 March 2016 at the Korakuen Hall. Hanagata gained revenge by defeating Oda via fifth-round TKO.

After five more fights–two wins, two draws and a loss–she faced Yuko Kuroki for a third time, with the vacant IBF female atomweight title on the line, on 29 September 2018 at the Korakuen Hall. Hanagata defeated Kuroki via split decision (SD) over ten rounds to capture her first world title. Two judges scored the bout 96–94 in favour of Hanagata while the third scored it 96–95 to Kuroki.

== Professional boxing record ==
28 fights	16 wins	7 losses
By knockout	7	0
By decision	9	7
Draws	5	

No.	Result	Record	Opponent	Type	Round, time	Date	Location	Notes
28	Draw	16–7–5	Eri Matsuda	MD	10	18 Mar 2021	Korakuen Hall, Tokyo, Japan	Retained IBF female atomweight title
27	Win	16–7–4	Nao Ikeyama	SD	10	12 Sep 2019	Korakuen Hall, Tokyo, Japan	Retained IBF female atomweight title
26	Win	15–7–4	Yuko Kuroki	SD	10	29 Sep 2018	Korakuen Hall, Tokyo, Japan	Won vacant IBF female atomweight title
25	Win	14–7–4	Erika Hanawa	UD	8	8 Mar 2018	Korakuen Hall, Tokyo, Japan	Retained OPBF female mini-flyweight title
24	Loss	13–7–4	Shione Ogata	MD	8	30 Sep 2017	KBS Hall, Kyoto, Japan	
23	Draw	13–6–4	Nao Ikeyama	SD	10	11 Jul 2017	Korakuen Hall, Tokyo, Japan	For WBO female atomweight title
22	Win	13–6–3	Tiradee Tipdee	TKO	2 (8), 1:08	15 Mar 2017	Korakuen Hall, Tokyo, Japan	
21	Draw	12–6–3	Nao Ikeyama	SD	10	13 Jun 2016	Korakuen Hall, Tokyo, Japan	For WBO female atomweight title
20	Win	12–6–2	Mika Oda	TKO	5 (8), 1:30	1 Mar 2016	Korakuen Hall, Tokyo, Japan	Won OPBF female mini-flyweight title
19	Win	11–6–2	Chie Higano	TKO	6 (6), 0:37	27 Dec 2015	Shinjuku FACE, Tokyo, Japan	
18	Win	10–6–2	Aiko Yamagishi	UD	6	6 Sep 2015	Techno Dome, Takaoka, Japan	
17	Loss	9–6–2	Naoko Shibata	MD	10	19 Feb 2015	Korakuen Hall, Tokyo, Japan	For IBF female light-flyweight title
16	Loss	9–5–2	Mika Oda	MD	8	24 Sep 2014	Korakuen Hall, Tokyo, Japan	Lost OPBF female mini-flyweight title
15	Win	9–4–2	Satomi Nishimura	TKO	5 (8), 1:23	11 Mar 2014	Korakuen Hall, Tokyo, Japan	Won vacant OPBF female mini-flyweight title
14	Draw	8–4–2	Yuko Kuroki	SD	8	3 Dec 2013	Korakuen Hall, Tokyo, Japan	For vacant OPBF female mini-flyweight title
13	Win	8–4–1	Yuko Kuroki	UD	8	24 Jun 2013	Korakuen Hall, Tokyo, Japan	
12	Loss	7–4–1	Kumiko Seesar Ikehara	UD	6	3 Mar 2013	Korakuen Hall, Tokyo, Japan	
11	Loss	7–3–1	Momo Koseki	UD	10	17 Dec 2012	Korakuen Hall, Tokyo, Japan	For WBC female atomweight title
10	Draw	7–2–1	Masae Akitaya	SD	8	1 Jul 2012	Yomiuri Bunka Hall, Toyonaka, Japan	
9	Win	7–2	Ting Li Yun	KO	6 (6), 1:43	22 Apr 2012	Tateyama Gym, Nakaniikawa District, Japan	
8	Win	6–2	Chiho Ueda	MD	4	26 Apr 2011	Korakuen Hall, Tokyo, Japan	
7	Loss	5–2	Jujeath Nagaowa	UD	6	11 Aug 2010	Korakuen Hall, Tokyo, Japan	
6	Win	5–1	Yuri Kobayashi	SD	4	4 Apr 2010	Prefectural Gymnasium, Wakayama, Japan	
5	Win	4–1	Natsume Yokozeki	KO	2 (4), 0:43	14 Dec 2009	Korakuen Hall, Tokyo, Japan	
4	Win	3–1	Chikako Aikawa	MD	4	13 Aug 2009	Korakuen Hall, Tokyo, Japan	
3	Win	2–1	Chikako Aikawa	SD	4	8 Jun 2009	Korakuen Hall, Tokyo, Japan	
2	Win	1–1	Riyako Goshi	TKO	3 (4), 1:29	7 Apr 2009	Korakuen Hall, Tokyo, Japan	
1	Loss	0–1	Yu Koshiishi	UD	4	12 Aug 2008	Korakuen Hall, Tokyo, Japan	
