= Eri Matsuda =

Japanese professional boxer (born 1994)

Personal information
- Nationality: Japanese
- Born: June 6, 1994 (age 32) Isehara, Kanagawa, Japan
- Height: 5 ft 2 in (1.57 m)
- Weight: Atomweight; Mini-flyweight; Light-flyweight

Boxing career
- Stance: Southpaw

Boxing record
- Total fights: 12
- Wins: 8
- Win by KO: 1
- Losses: 3
- Draws: 1

Eri Matsuda (born June 6, 1994) is a Japanese professional boxer. She held the WBA and WBO female world atomweight titles from January 2024 to November 2024.

== Career ==
Unbeaten in her first four professional fights, Matsuda challenged Saemi Hanagata for the IBF female atomweight title at Korakuen Hall in Tokyo, Japan, on 18 March 2021. The contest ended in a majority draw with one ringside judge scoring it 97–93 for Matsuda while the other two ruled it a 95–95 tie.

Hanagata having retired immediately after their fight. Matsuda had a second chance to win the now vacant IBF female atomweight crown on 25 February 2022, but lost by majority decision to Ayaka Miyao with two judges scoring the bout, which was again held at Korakuen Hall, 96–94 for her opponent and one viewing it as a 95–95 draw.

Returning once more to Korakuen Hall, Matsuda won a global championship at the third attempt when she dethroned WBO and WBA female atomweight champion Yuko Kuroki via split decision on 12 January 2024. Two ringside judges favoured Matsuda 97–93 and 96–94 with the third giving the fight 96–94 for Kuroki.

== Professional boxing record ==
10 fights	7 wins	2 losses
By knockout	1	0
By decision	6	2
Draws	1	

No.	Result	Record	Opponent	Type	Round, time	Date	Location	Notes
10	Loss	7–2–1	Tina Rupprecht	UD	10	23 Nov 2024	Olympiastützpunkt, Heidelberg, Germany	Lost WBA and WBO female atomweight titles; For WBC and inaugural The Ring female atomweight titles
9	Win	7–1–1	Yuko Kuroki	SD	10	12 Jan 2024	Korakuen Hall, Tokyo, Japan	Won WBA and WBO female atomweight titles
8	Win	6–1–1	Nanako Suzuki	UD	8	13 Jun 2023	Korakuen Hall, Tokyo, Japan	
7	Win	5–1–1	Kaori Nagai	UD	8	1 Sep 2022	Korakuen Hall, Tokyo, Japan	Won vacant OPBF female atomweight title
6	Loss	4–1–1	Ayaka Miyao	MD	10	25 Feb 2022	Korakuen Hall, Tokyo, Japan	For vacant IBF female atomweight title
5	Draw	4–0–1	Saemi Hanagata	MD	10	18 Mar 2021	Korakuen Hall, Tokyo, Japan	For IBF female atomweight title
4	Win	4–0	Mont Blanc Miki	TKO	5 (6), 1:55	12 Sep 2019	Korakuen Hall, Tokyo, Japan	Retained Japanese female atomweight title
3	Win	3–0	Nanae Suzuki	UD	8	13 Mar 2019	Korakuen Hall, Tokyo, Japan	Retained OPBF female atomweight title; Won Japanese female atomweight title
2	Win	2–0	Minayo Kei	UD	8	1 Dec 2018	EDION Arena Osaka, Osaka, Japan	Won vacant OPBF female atomweight title
1	Win	1–0	Sana Hazuki	UD	6	20 Aug 2018	Korakuen Hall, Tokyo, Japan	
