= Momo Koseki =

Japanese boxer (born 1982)

Momo Koseki 小関桃
Personal information
- Nationality: Japanese
- Born: 31 July 1982 (age 44) Tokyo, Japan
- Height: 5 ft 4 in (163 cm)
- Weight: Atomweight; Mini-flyweight; Light-flyweight

Boxing career
- Reach: 64 in (163 cm)
- Stance: Southpaw

Boxing record
- Total fights: 27
- Wins: 24
- Win by KO: 9
- Losses: 2
- Draws: 1

Momo Koseki (小関桃, Koseki Momo; born 31 July 1982) is a Japanese former professional boxer. She is a two-weight world champion, having held the WBC female atomweight title from 2008 to 2015; the WBA female atomweight title in 2015; and the WBC female strawweight title in 2017. Koseki made a record-breaking seventeen consecutive title defenses of her WBC atomweight title. Koseki is a member of the International Women's Boxing Hall of Fame.

== Career ==
Koseki was inspired to take up boxing after watching Hiroshi Kawashima on TV. Koseki won the inaugural All-Japan women's amateur championships in 2003, as well as the second edition in 2004. After winning a third national amateur title in 2007, she decided to turn pro as women's boxing was not yet accepted as an Olympic sport.

Koseki won her first three bouts. She went on to challenge Winyu Paradorngym for the inaugural WBC atomweight world title. Winyu won the fight by unanimous decision. In her next fight, Koseki moved up two weight classes to challenge for the WBC light flyweight title, but lost again by unanimous decision. In August 2008, Koseki rematched Paradorngym, and won the title with a round 2 knockout at Korakuen Hall. In August 2014, Koseki made her fourteenth consecutive defense, beating Denise Castle with a round 8 technical knockout. With the win, Koseki broke Yoko Gushiken's Japanese national record of 13 consecutive successful world title defenses. In October 2015, Koseki beat WBA champion Ayaka Miyao by unanimous decision to make her sixteenth defense and unify titles.

Koseki won the WBC minimumweight title on 17 December 2017, defeating reigning champion Yuko Kuroki by decision.

She retired on 29 January 2018, at the age of 34.

In October 2025, Koseki was named among the inductees for the 2026 International Women's Boxing Hall of Fame class.

== Professional boxing record ==
| 27 fights | 24 wins | 2 losses |
|---|---|---|
| By knockout | 9 | 0 |
| By decision | 15 | 2 |
| Draws | 1 | |

| No. | Result | Record | Opponent | Type | Round, time | Date | Location | Notes |
|---|---|---|---|---|---|---|---|---|
| 27 | Win | 24–2–1 | Yuko Kuroki | UD | 10 | 17 Dec 2017 | Kyuden Gym, Fukuoka, Japan | Won WBC female mini-flyweight title |
| 26 | Win | 23–2–1 | Chie Higano | TKO | 4 (10), 0:36 | 11 Nov 2016 | Korakuen Hall, Tokyo, Japan | Retained WBC female atomweight title |
| 25 | Win | 22–2–1 | Rungnapha Kaewkrachang | TKO | 1 (8), 1:45 | 13 Aug 2016 | City Culture Hall, Soka, Japan | |
| 24 | Win | 21–2–1 | Ayaka Miyao | UD | 10 | 22 Oct 2015 | Korakuen Hall, Tokyo, Japan | Retained WBC female atomweight title; Won WBA female atomweight title |
| 23 | Win | 20–2–1 | Aisah Alico | KO | 2 (10), 1:29 | 19 Feb 2015 | Korakuen Hall, Tokyo, Japan | Retained WBC female atomweight title |
| 22 | Win | 19–2–1 | Denise Castle | TKO | 8 (10), 0:29 | 2 Aug 2014 | Adachi Ward Sogo Sports Center, Tokyo, Japan | Retained WBC female atomweight title |
| 21 | Win | 18–2–1 | Angor Onesongchaigym | TKO | 9 (10), 1:43 | 3 Mar 2014 | Korakuen Hall, Tokyo, Japan | Retained WBC female atomweight title |
| 20 | Win | 17–2–1 | Nora Cardoza | UD | 10 | 14 Nov 2013 | Korakuen Hall, Tokyo, Japan | Retained WBC female atomweight title |
| 19 | Win | 16–2–1 | Huh Eun-young | TKO | 6 (10), 1:23 | 28 May 2013 | Hong Kong Convention and Exhibition Centre, Wan Chai, China | Retained WBC female atomweight title |
| 18 | Win | 15–2–1 | Maria del Refugio Jimenez | UD | 10 | 3 Mar 2013 | Korakuen Hall, Tokyo, Japan | Retained WBC female atomweight title |
| 17 | Win | 14–2–1 | Saemi Hanagata | UD | 10 | 17 Dec 2012 | Korakuen Hall, Tokyo, Japan | Retained WBC female atomweight title |
| 16 | Win | 13–2–1 | Jujeath Nagaowa | UD | 10 | 19 Jun 2012 | Korakuen Hall, Tokyo, Japan | Retained WBC female atomweight title |
| 15 | Win | 12–2–1 | Mami Ito | TD | 10 (10), 0:53 | 30 Nov 2011 | Korakuen Hall, Tokyo, Japan | Retained WBC female atomweight title |
| 14 | Win | 11–2–1 | Krikanok Islandmuaythai | TKO | 5 (10), 1:15 | 8 May 2011 | Korakuen Hall, Tokyo, Japan | Retained WBC female atomweight title |
| 13 | Draw | 10–2–1 | Masae Akitaya | TD | 3 (10), 2:00 | 6 Jun 2010 | Korakuen Hall, Tokyo, Japan | Retained WBC female atomweight title |
| 12 | Win | 10–2 | Shin Gun-joo | UD | 10 | 27 Mar 2010 | Ariake Colosseum, Tokyo, Japan | Retained WBC female atomweight title |
| 11 | Win | 9–2 | Teeraporn Pannimit | UD | 10 | 29 Nov 2009 | Saitama Super Arena, Saitama, Japan | Retained WBC female atomweight title |
| 10 | Win | 8–2 | Nao Ikeyama | UD | 10 | 2 May 2009 | Korakuen Hall, Tokyo, Japan | Retained WBC female atomweight title |
| 9 | Win | 7–2 | Kim Hye-min | UD | 10 | 8 Dec 2008 | Korakuen Hall, Tokyo, Japan | Retained WBC female atomweight title |
| 8 | Win | 6–2 | Chirawadee Srisuk | KO | 2 (10), 0:48 | 11 Aug 2008 | Korakuen Hall, Tokyo, Japan | Won WBC female atomweight title |
| 7 | Win | 5–2 | Petchsifah Sithkrumad | TKO | 2 (6), 0:54 | 9 Jun 2008 | Korakuen Hall, Tokyo, Japan | |
| 6 | Win | 4–2 | Mayumi Kubo | UD | 4 | 9 May 2008 | Korakuen Hall, Tokyo, Japan | |
| 5 | Loss | 3–2 | Siriporn Thaweesuk | UD | 10 | 19 Nov 2007 | The Mall Shopping Center Ngamwongwan, Bangkok, Thailand | For WBC female light-flyweight title |
| 4 | Loss | 3–1 | Chirawadee Srisuk | UD | 10 | 31 Aug 2007 | The Office of Pak Hai District, Ayutthaya, Thailand | For inaugural WBC female atomweight title |
| 3 | Win | 3–0 | Singsamaoy Sitnhongalampoon | PTS | 6 | 7 Jul 2007 | Bangkok, Thailand | |
| 2 | Win | 2–0 | Teeraporn Pannimit | UD | 6 | 16 Jun 2007 | Rajamangala Stadium, Bangkok, Thailand | |
| 1 | Win | 1–0 | Yupin Ha Payak | UD | 4 | 26 May 2007 | Rajamangala Stadium, Bangkok, Thailand | |
