= Yuko Kuroki =

Japanese boxer (born 1991)

Personal information
- Born: 黒木優子; 28 March 1991 (age 35) Fukuoka, Fukuoka Prefecture, Japan
- Height: 158 cm (5 ft 2 in)
- Weight: Atomweight; Minimumweight; Light-flyweight

Boxing career
- Reach: 158 cm (62 in)
- Stance: Southpaw

Boxing record
- Total fights: 36
- Wins: 25
- Win by KO: 10
- Losses: 9
- Draws: 2

Yuko Kuroki (黒木優子, Kuroki Yuko; born 28 March 1991) is a Japanese professional boxer. She has been a world champion in two-weight classes having held the WBA female minimumweight title from January 2025 to October 2025, the WBC female minimumweight title from 2014 to 2017 and the unified WBO and WBA female atomweight titles from 2022 to 2024.

== Professional boxing career ==
A professional boxer since 2008, Kuroki first challenged for a World title when she took on IBF female minimumweight title holder Etsuko Tada at Korakuen Hall, Tokyo, Japan, on 3 March 2013, losing by unanimous decision.

However, she did not have to wait long to get her hands on a global belt as she won the WBC female minimumweight World title on 17 May 2014, beating defending champion Mari Ando by unanimous decision at Azalea Taisho, Osaka, Japan.

After five successful defenses, she lost her title on 17 December 2017, to Momo Koseki slipping to a unanimous decision defeat at Kyuden Gym, Fukuoka, Japan.

Moving down a weight division, Kuroki faced Saemi Hanagata at Korakuen Hall on 29 September 2018, with the vacant IBF female atomweight World title on the line. She lost by split decision with one ringside judge scoring the bout 96–95 in her favour while the other two gave the contest 96–94 for her opponent.

Kuroki claimed the WBO female atomweight World title on 1 September 2022, winning via unanimous decision against Nanae Suzuki at Korakuen Hall. At the same venue on 30 March 2023, she defended the title in a rematch with Suzuki, again taking a unanimous decision win.

On 5 August 2023, Kuroki became a unified world champion when she defeated WBA female atomweight title holder Monserrat Alarcón by majority decision at Central Gym, Kobe, Japan. Two judges scored 96-94 for Kuroki while the third had the fight a 95–95 tie.

Returning to Korakuen Hall on 12 January 2024, she lost her titles to Eri Matsuda going down by split decision with one judge giving her the contest 96-94 but the other two awarding it to Matsuda 96-94 and 97–93.

In her next bout, Kuroki stopped Wisuta Sririttidet in the fourth of a scheduled eight rounds at Kanada Hall, Fukuchi, Japan, on 29 September 2024.

It was announced in December 2024, that she would fight the unbeaten Ye-Kyeng Seo for the vacant WBA female minimumweight title at Korakuen Hall on 21 January 2025. Kuroki won the bout by unanimous decision with all three ringside judges scoring it 96-94.

Kuroki defended her title against Nanako Suzuki at Korakuen Hall on 26 June 2025, winning the contest via unanimous decision.

She faced WBO female minimumweight champion Sarah Bormann in a title unification bout at the Wandersbeker Sporthalle in Hamburg, Germany, on 18 October 2025. Kuroki lost by split decision with one judge awarding her the bout 97-93, but the other two seeing it 97-93 and 96-95 respectively for her opponent.

== Professional boxing record ==
| 36 fights | 25 wins | 9 losses |
|---|---|---|
| By knockout | 10 | 0 |
| By decision | 15 | 9 |
| Draws | 2 | |

| No. | Result | Record | Opponent | Type | Round, time | Date | Location | Notes |
|---|---|---|---|---|---|---|---|---|
| 36 | Loss | 25–9–2 | Sarah Bormann | SD | 10 | 18 Oct 2025 | Wandersbeker Sporthalle, Hamburg, Germany | Lost WBA female minimumweight title; for WBO minimumweight title |
| 35 | Win | 25–8–2 | Nanako Suzuki | UD | 10 | 26 Jun 2025 | Korakuen Hall, Tokyo, Japan | Retained WBA female minimumweight title |
| 34 | Win | 24–8–2 | Ye-Kyeng Seo | UD | 10 | 21 Jan 2025 | Korakuen Hall, Tokyo, Japan | Won vacant WBA female minimumweight title |
| 33 | Win | 23–8–2 | Wisuta Sririttidet | TKO | 4 (8), 1:38 | 29 Sep 2024 | Kanada Hall, Fukuchi, Japan | |
| 32 | Loss | 22–8–2 | Eri Matsuda | SD | 10 | 12 Jan 2024 | Korakuen Hall, Tokyo, Japan | Lost WBA and WBO female atomweight titles |
| 31 | Win | 22–7–2 | Monserrat Alarcón | MD | 10 | 5 Aug 2023 | Central Gym, Kobe, Japan | Retained WBO female atomweight title; Won WBA female atomweight title |
| 30 | Win | 21–7–2 | Nanae Suzuki | UD | 10 | 30 Mar 2023 | Korakuen Hall, Tokyo, Japan | Retained WBO female atomweight title |
| 29 | Win | 20–7–2 | Nanae Suzuki | UD | 10 | 1 Sep 2022 | Korakuen Hall, Tokyo, Japan | Won WBO female atomweight title |
| 28 | Win | 19–7–2 | Sothita Sitthichai | TKO | 2 (8), 0:50 | 28 May 2022 | Singmanassak Muaythai School, Pathum Thani, Thailand | |
| 27 | Loss | 18–7–2 | Mizuki Chimoto | MD | 8 | 7 Jun 2021 | Korakuen Hall, Tokyo, Japan | For vacant OPBF female minimumweight title |
| 26 | Draw | 18–6–2 | Nao Ikeyama | SD | 8 | 14 Apr 2019 | KBS Hall, Kyoto, Japan | |
| 25 | Loss | 18–6–1 | Saemi Hanagata | SD | 10 | 29 Sep 2018 | Korakuen Hall, Tokyo, Japan | For vacant IBF female atomweight title |
| 24 | Win | 18–5–1 | Momoko Kanda | UD | 8 | 17 Apr 2018 | Korakuen Hall, Tokyo, Japan | |
| 23 | Loss | 17–5–1 | Momo Koseki | UD | 10 | 17 Dec 2017 | Kyuden Gym, Fukuoka, Japan | Lost WBC female minimumweight title |
| 22 | Win | 17–4–1 | Mari Ando | UD | 10 | 18 Dec 2016 | Kyuden Gym, Fukuoka, Japan | Retained WBC female minimumweight title |
| 21 | Win | 16–4–1 | Norj Guro | KO | 8 (10), 1:09 | 6 Jun 2016 | Korakuen Hall, Tokyo, Japan | Retained WBC female minimumweight title |
| 20 | Win | 15–4–1 | Nancy Franco | UD | 10 | 20 Dec 2015 | Kyuden Gym, Fukuoka, Japan | Retained WBC female minimumweight title |
| 19 | Win | 14–4–1 | Kanittha Ninthim | TKO | 3 (8) | 16 Aug 2015 | Kyuden Gym, Fukuoka, Japan | |
| 18 | Win | 13–4–1 | Masae Akitaya | UD | 10 | 9 May 2015 | Aqua Bunka Hall, Toyonaka, Japan | Retained WBC female minimumweight title |
| 17 | Win | 12–4–1 | Katia Gutiérrez | SD | 10 | 1 Nov 2014 | ACROS, Fukuoka, Japan | Retained WBC female minimumweight title |
| 16 | Win | 11–4–1 | Mari Ando | UD | 10 | 17 May 2014 | Azalea Taisho, Osaka, Japan | Won WBC female minimumweight title |
| 15 | Win | 10–4–1 | Aisah Alico | TKO | 3 (8) | 16 Mar 2014 | Kyuden Gym, Fukuoka, Japan | |
| 14 | Draw | 9–4–1 | Saemi Hanagata | SD | 10 | 13 Dec 2013 | Korakuen Hall, Tokyo, Japan | For vacant OPBF female minimumweight title |
| 13 | Loss | 9–4 | Saemi Hanagata | UD | 8 | 24 Jun 2013 | Korakuen Hall, Tokyo, Japan | |
| 12 | Loss | 9–3 | Etsuko Tada | UD | 10 | 3 Mar 2013 | Korakuen Hall, Tokyo, Japan | For WBA female minimumweight title |
| 11 | Win | 9–2 | Mika Oda | TKO | 2 (8) | 16 Nov 2012 | Korakuen Hall, Tokyo, Japan | |
| 10 | Win | 8–2 | Amara Naktaku | UD | 10 | 25 Dec 2011 | Kyuden Gym, Fukuoka, Japan | |
| 9 | Win | 7–2 | Wassana Kamdee | TKO | 4 (10), 1:56 | 8 Jul 2011 | Kyuden Gym, Fukuoka, Japan | Won WBC Youth female atomweight title |
| 8 | Win | 6–2 | Kim Na-kyung | TKO | 3 (8) | 8 May 2011 | Accion, Fukuoka, Japan | |
| 7 | Win | 5–2 | Liu Qi | KO | 3 (6) | 26 Dec 2010 | Kyuden Gym, Fukuoka, Japan | |
| 6 | Win | 4–2 | Rinks Nakahara | UD | 4 | 17 Oct 2010 | Prefectural Gymnasium, Kurume, Japan | |
| 5 | Win | 3–2 | Liu Dalin | UD | 4 | 23 May 2010 | Accion, Fukuoka, Japan | |
| 4 | Win | 2–2 | Amy Berezowski | TKO | 2 (4) | 19 Dec 2009 | Kyuden Gym, Fukuoka, Japan | |
| 3 | Loss | 1–2 | Naoko Shibata | MD | 4 | 26 Jun 2009 | Korakuen Hall, Tokyo, Japan | |
| 2 | Win | 1–1 | Natsume Yokozeki | UD | 4 | 5 Apr 2009 | Clover Plaza, Kasuga, Japan | |
| 1 | Loss | 0–1 | Kumiko Nishida | MD | 4 | 20 Dec 2008 | Momochi Gym, Fukuoka, Japan | |
