= Nao Ikeyama =

Japanese boxer (born 1969)

Nao Ikeyama 池山直
Personal information
- Nationality: Japanese
- Born: 18 September 1969 (age 56) Maniwa, Okayama, Japan
- Height: 5 ft 0.5 in (154 cm)
- Weight: Atomweight; Mini-flyweight; Light-flyweight

Boxing career
- Stance: Orthodox

Boxing record
- Total fights: 29
- Wins: 18
- Win by KO: 5
- Losses: 7
- Draws: 4

Nao Ikeyama (born 18 September 1969) is a Japanese boxer who held the WBO atomweight title from 17 May 2014 until 29 July 2018. She made her professional debut on 30 November 2003, where she defeated Satoko Kamimura by unanimous decision. Ikeyama made six successful title defenses for her belt, with her sixth title defense coming against Saemi Hanagata on 12 July 2017. In 2015, Ikeyama participated in the first ever professional boxing event in Sri Lanka, where she defended her title against Jujeath Nagaowa.

== Professional boxing record ==
29 fights	18 wins	7 losses
By knockout	5	0
By decision	13	7
Draws	4	

No.	Result	Record	Opponent	Type	Round, time	Date	Location	Notes
29	Loss	18–7–4	Kayoko Ebata	UD	6	15 Oct 2021	Korakuen Hall, Tokyo, Japan	
28	Loss	18–6–4	Saemi Hanagata	SD	10	12 Sep 2019	Korakuen Hall, Tokyo, Japan	For IBF female atomweight title
27	Draw	18–5–4	Yuko Kuroki	SD	8	14 Apr 2019	KBS Hall, Kyoto, Japan	
26	Loss	18–5–3	Ayaka Miyao	UD	10	20 Nov 2018	Korakuen Hall, Tokyo, Japan	For WBA interim female atomweight title
25	Loss	18–4–3	Mika Iwakawa	SD	10	29 Jul 2018	KBS Hall, Kyoto, Japan	Lost WBO female atomweight title
24	Draw	18–3–3	Saemi Hanagata	SD	10	11 Jul 2017	Korakuen Hall, Tokyo, Japan	Retained WBO female atomweight title
23	Win	18–3–2	Ayaka Miyao	TKO	6 (10), 0:36	13 Dec 2016	Korakuen Hall, Tokyo, Japan	Retained WBO female atomweight title
22	Draw	17–3–2	Saemi Hanagata	SD	10	13 Jun 2016	Korakuen Hall, Tokyo, Japan	Retained WBO female atomweight title
21	Win	17–3–1	Jujeath Nagaowa	UD	10	19 Dec 2015	Sirasa Stein Studios, Colombo, Sri Lanka	Retained WBO female atomweight title
20	Win	16–3–1	Norj Guro	UD	10	28 Feb 2015	Azalea Taisho, Osaka, Japan	Retained WBO female atomweight title
19	Win	15–3–1	Masae Akitaya	UD	10	20 Sep 2014	Azalea Taisho, Osaka, Japan	Retained WBO female atomweight title
18	Win	14–3–1	Jessebelle Pagaduan	UD	10	17 May 2014	Azalea Taisho, Osaka, Japan	Won inaugural WBO female atomweight title
17	Win	13–3–1	Mika Iwakawa	MD	6	14 Dec 2013	Azalea Taisho, Osaka, Japan	
16	Win	12–3–1	Mika Oda	SD	6	5 Dec 2010	ATC Hall, Osaka, Japan	
15	Loss	11–3–1	Park Ji-hyun	UD	10	15 Aug 2010	Goseong Gymnasium, Goseong, South Korea	For IFBA mini-flyweight title
14	Win	11–2–1	Masae Akitaya	UD	6	16 May 2010	ATC Hall, Osaka, Japan	
13	Loss	10–2–1	Momo Koseki	UD	10	2 May 2009	Korakuen Hall, Tokyo, Japan	For WBC female atomweight title
12	Win	10–1–1	Satoko Kamimura	UD	6	23 Nov 2008	Saty Hall, Sakaide, Japan	
11	Win	9–1–1	Buasawan Wisetchat	TKO	2 (6), 0:46	3 Aug 2008	Saty Hall, Sakaide, Japan	
10	Win	8–1–1	Krisztina Belinszky	UD	10	18 Nov 2007	Orange Hall, Okayama, Japan	Won vacant WIBA mini-flyweight title
9	Win	7–1–1	Kim Na-kyung	KO	3 (6)	13 May 2007	Okayama, Japan	
8	Win	6–1–1	Kumiko Nishida	SD	8	1 Oct 2006	Okayama, Japan	
7	Win	5–1–1	Ayaka Miyao	KO	4 (8)	30 Apr 2006	Orange Hall, Okayama, Japan	Won JWBC female mini-flyweight title
6	Win	4–1–1	Gypsy Taeko	UD	6	20 Nov 2005	Okayama, Japan	
5	Draw	3–1–1	Nanako Kikuchi	PTS	8	12 Jun 2005	Kitazawa Town Hall, Tokyo, Japan	For JWBC female mini-flyweight title
4	Win	3–1	Marika Watanabe	PTS	6	13 Mar 2005	Velfarre, Tokyo, Japan	
3	Loss	2–1	Nanako Kikuchi	UD	4	23 May 2004	Tokyo, Japan	
2	Win	2–0	Yuki Sakurada	KO	2 (4)	22 Feb 2004	Omori Gold Gym, Tokyo, Japan	
1	Win	1–0	Satoko Kamimura	UD	4	30 Nov 2003	Tokyo, Japan	
