= Chirawadee Srisuk =

Thai boxer

Winyu Paradorn Gym
Personal information
- Born: Chirawadee Srisuk; 28 August 1983 (age 42) Phitsanulok province, Thailand
- Height: 5 ft 5 in (165 cm)
- Weight: Atomweight; Mini-flyweight

Boxing career
- Stance: Orthodox

Boxing record
- Total fights: 10
- Wins: 6
- Win by KO: 1
- Losses: 3
- Draws: 1

Chirawadee Srisuk (Thai: จิรวดี สีสุข; born August 28, 1983), known as Winyu Paradorn Gym (Thai: วินยู ภราดรยิม), is a Thai professional boxer. She is a former WBC female atomweight champion. Srisuk is the second Thai woman to win a boxing world title after Siriporn Thaweesuk, the former WBC women's light flyweight champion.

== Boxing career ==
Srisuk became the inaugural WBC female atomweight champion when she defeated Momo Koseki by unanimous decision on August 31, 2007.

Srisuk lost the WBC atomweight title in her first title defense in a rematch against Koseki by second-round knockout on August 11, 2008. The fight was controversial as the it ended due to a clash of heads that rendered Srisuk unable to continue.

While there were talks of a third fight between Srisuk and Koseki, the fight never materialized as Srisuk lost to future WBO female mini flyweight champion Teeraporn Pannimit in 2009 and abruptly retired from boxing.

== Championships and accomplishments ==
- World Boxing Council
  - WBC Female World Atomweight Championship (One time)

== Professional boxing record ==
10 fights	6 wins	3 losses
By knockout	1	1
By decision	5	2
Draws	1	

No.	Result	Record	Opponent	Type	Round, time	Date	Location	Notes
10	Loss	6–3–1	Teeraporn Pannimit	UD	6	2 Jan 2009	Rimbung Market, Bangkok, Thailand	
9	Loss	6–2–1	Momo Koseki	KO	2 (10), 0:48	11 Aug 2008	Korakuen Hall, Tokyo, Japan	Lost WBC female atomweight title
8	Win	6–1–1	Paetonglek Jindamanee	UD	6	8 Jul 2008	Omnoi Stadium, Samut Sakhon, Thailand	
7	Win	5–1–1	Tukta Pakabbuth	PTS	6	20 Feb 2008	Ban Kwao, Chaiyaphum, Thailand	
6	Draw	4–1–1	Tukta Pakabbuth	MD	8	23 Oct 2007	Wat Takien, Bang Pahan, Thailand	
5	Win	4–1	Momo Koseki	UD	10	31 Aug 2007	The Office of Pak Hai District, Ayutthaya, Thailand	Won inaugural WBC female atomweight title
4	Win	3–1	Panda Or Yutthachai	TKO	5 (8)	10 May 2007	Rajamangala Stadium, Bangkok, Thailand	
3	Win	2–1	Napaporn Boonchuon	SD	8	26 Jan 2007	Samut Sakhon, Thailand	
2	Loss	1–1	Siriporn Thaweesuk	UD	6	22 Nov 2006	Bangprakong Wittayayon School, Bang Pakong, Thailand	
1	Win	1–0	Wannee Chaisena	UD	4	31 Aug 2006	Dhurakij Pundit University, Bangkok, Thailand	
