= Kasumi Saeki =

Japanese boxer (born 1996)

Kasumi Saeki 佐伯 霞
Personal information
- Nationality: Japanese
- Born: July 16, 1996 (age 30) Konohana-ku, Osaka, Japan
- Height: 1.54 m (5 ft 1 in)
- Weight: Light flyweight

Boxing career
- Stance: Orthodox

Boxing record
- Total fights: 4
- Wins: 4
- Win by KO: 3

Kasumi Saeki (佐伯 霞, Saeki Kasumi; born July 16, 1996) is a Japanese professional boxer who held the WBO female mini flyweight title in 2019.

== Career ==
=== Early career ===
Born in Osaka, Saeki started practicing combat sports at the age of six with kickboxing. A few years later, whilst at elementary school, she picked boxing and began competing at amateur championships in Japan and world-wide, having several important wins, most notably in 2011 at the AIBA World Women's Youth Championships in Antalya and the 2014 Japanese Women's National Championships held in Shizuoka. Saeki finished her amateur career with a 35–9 record.

=== Professional career ===
After a successful amateur career, Saeki made her professional debut on May 27, 2018, against Floryvic Montero, winning the bout by unanimous decision after six rounds.

Saeki fought Wassana Kamdee on December 1, 2018, for the vacant WBO Asia Pacific female mini flyweight title, winning by technical knockout (TKO) in the third round.

On April 27, 2019, Saeki fought against Elizabeth López for the vacant WBO female mini flyweight title at the EDION Arena Osaka. Saeki won the fight by TKO in the sixth round.

Saeki vacated the title for undisclosed reasons on 18 December 2019.

== Professional boxing record ==
4 fights	4 wins	0 losses
By knockout	3	0
By decision	1	0

No.	Result	Record	Opponent	Type	Round, time	Date	Location	Notes
4	Win	4–0	(Mexico) Elizabeth López	TKO	6 (10)	2019-04-27	EDION Arena Osaka, Osaka, Japan	Won vacant WBO female mini flyweight title
3	Win	3–0	(Thailand) Wassana Kamdee	TKO	3 (8)	2018-12-01	EDION Arena Osaka, Osaka, Japan	Won vacant WBO Asia Pacific female mini flyweight title
2	Win	2–0	(Thailand) Kanyarat Yoohanngoh	TKO	6 (6)	2018-08-11	City Sogo Gym, Hirakata, Japan	
1	Win	1–0	(Philippines) Floryvic Montero	UD	6	2018-05-27	Big Wave, Wakayama, Japan	
