= Sabrina Maribel Pérez =

Argentine boxer (born 1986)

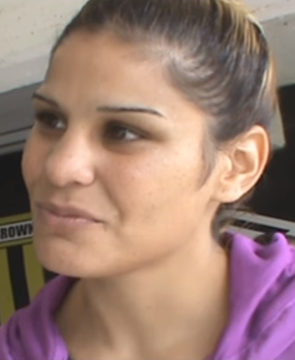

Personal information
- Nickname: La Munequita ("The little doll")
- Born: 14 November 1986 (age 39) Isidro Casanova, Argentina
- Height: 5 ft 2 in (157 cm)
- Weight: Bantamweight; Super bantamweight; Featherweight

Boxing career
- Stance: Orthodox

Boxing record
- Total fights: 21
- Wins: 18
- Win by KO: 2
- Losses: 2
- Draws: 1

Sabrina Maribel Pérez (born 14 November 1986) is an Argentine professional boxer. She held the WBO women's junior featherweight title in 2016 and women's bantamweight title from 2016 to 2017. She also held the WBC interim women's featherweight title from 2022 to 2023.

== Professional career ==
On 19 March 2022, Pérez faced Yolis Marrugo for the interim WBC featherweight championship. She won the bout by unanimous decision.

On 15 September 2023, Pérez faced Skye Nicolson for her first title defense at Auditorio Municipal Fausto Gutierrez Moreno in Tijuana, Mexico. She lost the fight by unanimous decision.

== Professional boxing record ==
21 fights	18 wins	2 losses
By knockout	2	1
By decision	16	1
Draws	1	

No.	Result	Record	Opponent	Type	Round, time	Date	Location	Notes
21	Loss	18–2–1	Skye Nicolson	UD	10 (10)	2023-09-15	Auditorio Municipal, Tijuana, Mexico	Lost Interim WBC featherweight title
20	Win	18–1–1	Yolis Marrugo Franco	UD	10 (10)	2022-03-19	Club Portugués, Isidro Casanova, Argentina	Won Interim WBC featherweight title
19	Win	17–1–1	Silvia Fernanda Zacarias	MD	4 (4)	2020-02-08	Sociedad de Fomento Juan XXIII, Rafael Castillo, Argentina	
18	Loss	16–1–1	Marianela Soledad Ramirez	TKO	1 (6)	2018-11-16	Club 12 de Octubre, Isidro Casanova, Argentina	
17	Win	16–0–1	Lilian Dolores Silva	SD	10 (10)	2018-03-31	Club Social y Deportivo Colon, Chivilcoy, Argentina	Won vacant Argentine featherweight title
16	Win	15–0–1	Alondra Garcia	UD	10 (10)	2016-11-26	Club Social y Deportivo, Isidro Casanova, Argentina	Won vacant WBO bantamweight title
15	Win	14–0–1	Maria Jose Nunez	UD	10 (10)	2016-02-06	Club Social y Deportivo, Isidro Casanova, Argentina	Won Interim WBO super-bantamweight title
14	Win	13–0–1	Vanesa del Valle Calderon	UD	6 (6)	2015-07-25	Club Social y Deportivo, Isidro Casanova, Argentina	
13	Win	12–0–1	Florencia Roxana Canteros	UD	10 (10)	2014-09-27	Club Social y Deportivo, Isidro Casanova, Argentina	Retained WBC Silver super-bantamweight title
12	Win	11–0–1	Cristina Del Valle Pacheco	SD	10 (10)	2014-05-31	Club Atlético y Social, Bella Vista, Argentina	Won vacant WBC Silver super-bantamweight title
11	Draw	10–0–1	Carolina Duer	SD	10 (10)	2013-05-24	Instituto San Isidro, Verónica, Argentina	For vacant WBO bantamweight title
10	Win	10–0	Stefany Bizquiazo	UD	10 (10)	2012-12-12	Estadio Luna Park, Buenos Aires, Argentina	
9	Win	9–0	Estrella Valverde	UD	10 (10)	2012-05-18	Club Portugués, Isidro Casanova, Argentina	
8	Win	8–0	Vannessa Guimaraes	TKO	4 (10)	2011-08-12	Club Isidro Casanova, Isidro Casanova, Argentina	
7	Win	7–0	Norma Elizabeth Diaz Caucota	UD	10 (10)	2011-06-03	Club Petete, Isidro Casanova, Argentina	Retained WBC Mundo Hispano bantamweight title
6	Win	6–0	Cristina Del Valle Pacheco	MD	6 (6)	2010-12-11	Club Casanova Oeste, Isidro Casanova, Argentina	
5	Win	5–0	Natalia del Pilar Burga	MD	10 (10)	2010-07-17	Club Isidro Casanova, Isidro Casanova, Argentina	Won vacant WBC Mundo Hispano bantamweight title
4	Win	4–0	Anahi Yolanda Salles	UD	6 (6)	2010-02-20	Club 30 De Octubre, San Justo, Argentina	
3	Win	3–0	Lili del Valle Moreno	TKO	2 (4)	2009-10-16	Colón, Argentina	
2	Win	2–0	Soledad Andrea Torres	UD	4 (4)	2009-09-11	Club Casanova Oeste, Isidro Casanova, Argentina	
1	Win	1–0	Soledad Andrea Torres	UD	4 (4)	2008-12-13	Isidro Casanova, Argentina	

== Personal life ==
Pérez was married to Diego Arrúa who was also her trainer. Arrúa died after he suffered a heart attack during Pérez's title defense against Nicolson.

== See also ==
- List of female boxers

Sporting positions
Regional boxing titles
New title	WBC Mundo Hispano bantamweight champion July 17, 2010 – 2011; Vacated	Vacant
Vacant Title last held by Yazmín Rivas	WBC Silver super-bantamweight champion May 31, 2014 – 2011; Vacated	Vacant Title next held by Shannon O'Connell
Vacant Title last held by Lizbeth Crespo	Argentine featherweight champion March 31, 2018 – 2019; Vacated	Vacant Title next held by Edith Soledad Matthysse
World boxing titles
Vacant Title last held by Yésica Marcos	WBO super-bantamweight champion Interim title February 6, 2016 – May 10, 2016; Promoted	Vacant
Preceded by Marcela Acuña; Vacated	WBO super-bantamweight champion May 10, 2016 – 2016; Vacated	Vacant Title next held by Amanda Serrano
Vacant Title last held by Naoko Fujioka	WBO bantamweight champion November 26, 2016 – 2017; Vacated	Vacant Title next held by Amanda Serrano
Vacant Title last held by Amanda Serrano	WBC featherweight champion Interim title March 19, 2022 – September 15, 2023	Succeeded by Skye Nicolson
