= Yésica Marcos =

Argentinian boxer (born 1986)

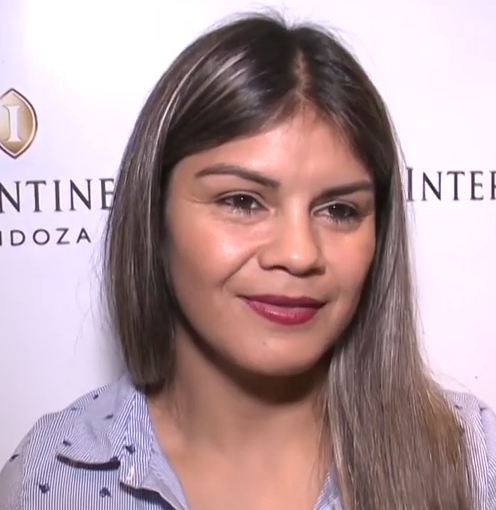

Personal information
- Nicknames: Bombon Asesino; La Leona
- Born: Yésica Patricia Marcos Mulero; March 5, 1986 (age 40) San Martín, Mendoza, Argentina
- Weight: Super bantamweight

Boxing career
- Stance: Orthodox

Boxing record
- Total fights: 32
- Wins: 28
- Win by KO: 9
- Losses: 2
- Draws: 2

Yésica Patricia Marcos Mulero (born March 5, 1986) is an Argentine former professional boxer who held the WBO and WBA super-bantamweight titles.

== Professional career ==
Marcos turned professional in 2008 and compiled a record of 18–0–1 before beating Ana Julaton in 2012 to win the WBO super-bantamweight title. She was stripped of the title in 2013 for inactivity.

== Professional boxing record ==
32 fights	28 wins	2 losses
By knockout	9	1
By decision	19	1
Draws	2	

No.	Result	Record	Opponent	Type	Round, time	Date	Location	Notes
32	Loss	28–2–2	Ségolène Lefebvre	UD	10 (10)	2018-11-02	Salle Gayant, Douai, France	For WBF super-bantamweight title
31	Win	28–1–2	Cristina Del Valle Pacheco	SD	6 (6)	2018-03-23	Gran Arena Monticello, Mostazal, Chile	
30	Loss	27–1–2	Marcela Acuña	KO	10 (10)	2016-12-16	Parque Industrial de Desarrollo Productivo, Cuartel V, Argentina	For vacant IBF super-bantamweight title
29	Win	27–0–2	Miriam Avila	UD	10 (10)	2015-11-14	Estadio Pascual Perez, Mendoza, Argentina	
28	Win	26–0–2	Antonina Ayala Vazquez	UD	6 (6)	2014-12-19	Polideportivo Gustavo Toro Rodriguez, San Martín, Argentina	
27	Win	25–0–2	Estrella Valverde	KO	1 (10)	2014-10-31	Teatro Griego Juan Pablo Segundo, San Martín, Argentina	Retained WBA super-bantamweight title
26	Win	24–0–2	Silvia Fernanda Zacarias	KO	4 (8)	2014-09-12	Estadio Deportistas Alvearenses, General Alvear, Argentina	
25	Win	23–0–2	Silvia Fernanda Zacarias	UD	6 (6)	2014-03-28	Anfiteatro Municipal, Villa María, Argentina	
24	Win	22–0–2	Angela Marciales	UD	10 (10)	2013-12-13	Teatro Griego Juan Pablo Segundo, San Martín, Argentina	Retained WBA super-bantamweight title
23	Draw	21–0–2	Marcela Acuña	SD	10 (10)	2013-01-25	Teatro Griego Juan Pablo Segundo, San Martín, Argentina	Retained WBA & WBO super-bantamweight titles
22	Win	21–0–1	Paula Andrea Morales	UD	8 (8)	2012-11-10	Polideportivo Municipal, Malargüe, Argentina	
21	Win	20–0–1	Dayana Cordero	TKO	6 (10)	2012-10-06	Polideportivo Gustavo Toro Rodriguez, San Martín, Argentina	Retained WBO super-bantamweight title
20	Win	19–0–1	Ana Julaton	UD	10 (10)	2012-03-16	Teatro Griego Juan Pablo Segundo, San Martín, Argentina	Won WBO super-bantamweight title
19	Win	18–0–1	Simone Aparecida da Silva	RTD	4 (10)	2011-10-08	Polideportivo Gustavo Toro Rodriguez, San Martín, Argentina	Retained interim WBA super-bantamweight title; Won interim WBO super-bantamweight title
18	Win	17–0–1	Maria Andrea Miranda	UD	10 (10)	2011-03-18	Anfiteatro Municipal, San Martín, Argentina	Retained interim WBA super-bantamweight title
17	Win	16–0–1	Yolis Marrugo Franco	KO	8 (10)	2010-11-19	Teatro Griego Juan Pablo Segundo, San Martín, Argentina	Retained interim WBA super-bantamweight title
16	Win	15–0–1	Simone Aparecida da Silva	UD	10 (10)	2010-04-09	Teatro Griego Juan Pablo Segundo, San Martín, Argentina	Won interim WBA super-bantamweight title
15	Win	14–0–1	Betina Gabriela Garino	UD	9 (9)	2009-12-18	Polideportivo La Colonia, Junín, Argentina	Won vacant WBA Fedelatin super-bantamweight title
14	Win	13–0–1	Cristina Del Valle Pacheco	UD	10 (10)	2009-11-28	Casino de Mendoza, Mendoza, Argentina	
13	Win	12–0–1	Marisa Joana Portillo	UD	10 (10)	2009-10-02	Club Atletico San Martín, San Martín, Argentina	Won vacant Argentine super-bantamweight title
12	Win	11–0–1	Antonina Ayala Vazquez	KO	2 (8)	2009-09-12	Casino de Mendoza, Mendoza, Argentina	
11	Draw	10–0–1	Ivonne Anahi Cordoba	SD	6 (6)	2009-08-20	Estadio Luna Park, Buenos Aires, Argentina	
10	Win	10–0	Sonia Edith Paladino	KO	7 (8)	2009-07-17	Polideportivo San Pedro, San Martín, Argentina	
9	Win	9–0	Maria del Carmen Potenza	TKO	3 (6)	2009-04-30	Estadio Luna Park, Buenos Aires, Argentina	
8	Win	8–0	Adriana Herrera	RTD	8 (10)	2009-03-14	Club Atletico San Martín, San Martín, Argentina	Won vacant South American super-bantamweight title
7	Win	7–0	Natalia del Pilar Burga	UD	8 (8)	2009-02-13	Polideportivo San Pedro, San Martín, Argentina	
6	Win	6–0	Maria del Carmen Potenza	UD	6 (6)	2008-12-19	Polideportivo Municipal, Tunuyán, Argentina	
5	Win	5–0	Maria del Carmen Montiel	UD	4 (4)	2008-12-05	Polideportivo Municipal, Rivadavia, Argentina	
4	Win	4–0	Sonia Edith Paladino	UD	4 (4)	2008-11-08	Club Atletico San Martín, San Martín, Argentina	
3	Win	3–0	Natalia del Pilar Burga	UD	4 (4)	2008-10-17	Polideportivo Municipal, Malargüe, Argentina	
2	Win	2–0	Sonia Edith Paladino	UD	4 (4)	2008-10-03	Club Atletico San Martín, San Martín, Argentina	
1	Win	1–0	Cristina Del Valle Pacheco	UD	4 (4)	2008-09-05	Polideportivo San Pedro, San Martín, Argentina	

== See also ==
- List of female boxers

Sporting positions
Regional boxing titles
New title	South American female super-bantamweight champion March 14, 2009 – 2009; Vacated	Vacant Title next held by Carolina Duer
Vacant Title last held by Marcela Acuña	Argentine female super-bantamweight champion October 2, 2009 – 2009; Vacated	Vacant Title next held by Laura Soledad Griffa
New title	WBA Fedelatin female super-bantamweight champion December 18, 2009 – 2009; Vacated	Vacant Title next held by Ana Maria Lozano
World boxing titles
New title	WBA female super-bantamweight champion Interim title April 9, 2010 – March 16, 2012; Won world title	Vacant Title next held by Alys Sánchez
New title	WBO female super-bantamweight champion Interim title October 8, 2011 – March 16, 2012; Won world title	Vacant Title next held by Sabrina Maribel Pérez
Preceded by Ana Julaton	WBO female super-bantamweight champion March 16, 2012 – 2013; Vacated	Vacant Title next held by Marcela Acuña
Vacant Title last held by Jackie Nava	WBA female super-bantamweight champion October 6, 2012 – 2014; Vacated	Succeeded by Liliana Palmera promoted from interim status
