= Daniela Romina Bermúdez =

Argentine boxer (born 1989)

Personal information
- Nickname: La Bonita
- Born: 7 July 1989 (age 37) Villa Gobernador Gálvez, Santa Fe Province, Argentina
- Height: 5 ft 5 in (165 cm)
- Weight: Light flyweight; Flyweight; Super flyweight; Bantamweight; Super bantamweight; Featherweight

Boxing career
- Reach: 67 in (170 cm)
- Stance: Orthodox

Boxing record
- Total fights: 41
- Wins: 32
- Win by KO: 12
- Losses: 6
- Draws: 3

Daniela Romina Bermúdez (born 7 July 1989) is an Argentine professional boxer. She is a former world champion in three weight classes, having held the WBO female bantamweight title twice between 2013 and 2020; the WBO female super-flyweight title from 2014 to 2017; and the IBF female junior-featherweight title twice between 2018 and 2020. She is the older sister of former light-flyweight world champion of boxing, Evelyn Nazarena Bermúdez.

== Early life ==
Daniela Romina Bermúdez was born on 7 July 1989 in Rosario, Santa Fe, Argentina. She comes from a fighting family where three of her five siblings are fellow boxers; Roxana, Gustavo and IBF light-flyweight champion, Evelyn. The family own a gym called Bermúdez Boxing Club in Villa Gobernador Gálvez, Santa Fe.

== Professional career ==
Bermúdez made her professional debut on 26 March 2010, scoring a four-round split decision (SD) victory over Roxana Virginia Baron at the Estadio Pedro Estremador in Bariloche, Argentina. She fought a further four times in 2010; a knockout (KO) win over Maria Terriaza in April; two consecutive majority draws (MD) against Betiana Patricia Vinas in July and October; and a four-round unanimous decision (UD) win over Graciela Ines De Luca in November.

She began 2011 with a unanimous decision win over Cristina del Valle Pacheco in February, followed by a ten-round unanimous decision loss to Edith Soledad Matthysse in April and a six-round majority decision (MD) win in a rematch with Matthysse in August. A month later she made her first attempt at a world title by challenging reigning WBA light-flyweight champion Yésica Bopp on 24 September at the Polideportivo Posta del Retamo in Junín, Argentina. Bermúdez lost via unanimous decision over ten rounds, with the judges' scorecards reading 100–90, 97–94 and 96–94. Bermúdez ended the year with a six-round unanimous decision victory over Norma Elizabeth Diaz Caucota in November.

Following a second-round technical knockout (TKO) win over Marta Soledad Juncos in January 2012, she faced Mayerlin Rivas on 31 March at Club Atlético Talleres in Villa Gonernador Gálvez, Argentina, with the vacant WBA interim bantamweight title on the line. Bermúdez captured the interim title by majority decision over ten rounds. One judge scored the bout a draw at 95–95, while the other two scored it 95–94 and 96–94 in favour of Bermúdez.

Two months after winning the WBA interim bantamweight title, she moved down a weight class to fight Judith Rodriguez on 12 May at Club America in Buenos Aires, this time for the vacant WBA interim super-flyweight title. Bermúdez won the bout via ten-round unanimous decision, with the scorecards reading 99–91, 97–94 and 96–94. She fought another two times in 2012; a successful defence of her interim super-flyweight title via second-round technical knockout against Olga Julio in August and a unanimous decision victory over Anahi Yolanda Salles in a six-round non-title bout in December.

She defended the title twice in 2013 – with unanimous decision victories over Romina Alcantara in February and Guadalupe Martínez Guzmán in April – before moving up in weight to face Neisi Torres for the vacant WBO bantamweight title on 31 May, at the Gimnasio Pedro Estremador in Bariloche. Bermúdez won the bout by first-round technical knockout to capture her first full world title. She moved back down to super-flyweight for her last fight of 2013; defeating Judith Rodriguez for a second time in September by unanimous decision in defence of her WBA interim title.

Her first fight of 2014 came on January 4, against Linda Laura Lecca for the vacant WBO super-flyweight title at Piso de los Deportes in Buenos Aires. Bermúdez won the fight via eighth-round technical knockout to become a two-weight world champion. Three months later, she moved down in weight to face former conqueror Yésica Bopp for the vacant WBO flyweight title. The bout was held on 26 April 2014 at the Polideportivo Carlos Magalot in Río Grande. Bermúdez failed in her attempt to become a three-weight world champion, losing by unanimous decision. Two judges scored the bout 97–93 while the third scored it 98–92.

Following the loss to Bopp, Bermùdez moved back up to super-flyweight to successfully defend her WBO title against Vanesa Lorena Taborda in January 2015, winning by majority decision. Her second and last fight of 2015 was against Tomomi Tanaka in November, fighting for the first time outside of Argentina at the Korakuen Hall in Tokyo, Japan. Bermúdez retained her title via fourth-round knockout.

She scored three unanimous decision victories in 2016; against Paola Pamela Benavidez in an eight-round non-title bout in May; a WBO super-flyweight defence against Marisa Joana Portillo in June; and a ten-round non-title bout against Mariana Juárez in August which served as a final eliminator for the WBC bantamweight title.

She next faced Paola Pamela Benavidez in a rematch in June 2017 – fighting to a split decision draw to retain her WBO super-flyweight title – before moving up in weight to face Soledad del Valle Frias for the vacant WBO bantamweight title on 20 October 2017. The fight was held at Estadio Olímpico in Palpalá, Argentina. Bermúdez won by a shutout unanimous decision, becoming a two-weight world champion on her second try. All three judges scored the bout 100–90.

Six months later, Bermúdez moved up in weight yet again, challenging reigning IBF junior-featherweight champion Marcela Acuña on 13 April 2018 at the Microestadio Municipal in Buenos Aires. Bermúdez won by unanimous decision to become a three-weight world champion, with the judges' scorecards reading 98–92, 97–93 and 96–94. She fought once more in 2018, moving back down to bantamweight to successfully defend her WBO title with a fourth-round corner retirement (RTD) win over Yolis Marrugo Franco.

Bermúdez defended the title twice more in 2019; a unanimous decision win over Irma Garcia in March and an eighth-round corner retirement win against Valeria Perez in July.

On 4 December 2020, Bermúdez claimed the vacant IBF female junior-featherweight title by stopping Cintia Gisela Castillo in the 10th round of their contest in Zavalla, Argentina.

Switching weight divisions again for her next fight on 25 March 2021, Bermúdez challenged WBC and WBO female featherweight champion Amanda Serrano in a bout that was also for the vacant IBO crown. Serrano knocked out Bermúdez in the ninth-round of the contest in San Juan, Puerto Rico.

She fought Nina Meinke for the vacant IBF female featherweight title at Sporthalle in Hamburg, Germany, on 21 September 2024, but lost by majority decisionwith two ringside judges favouring Meinke 118-110 and 119-109 respectively while the third scored the fight a 114-114 draw. A rematch took place at Stadthalle in Rostock, Germany, on 10 May 2025, with Bermúdez losing via unanimous decision this time.

== Professional boxing record ==
41 fights	32 wins	6 losses
By knockout	12	1
By decision	20	5
Draws	3	

No.	Result	Record	Opponent	Type	Round, time	Date	Location	Notes
41	Loss	32–6–3	(Germany) Nina Meinke	UD	12	10 May 2025	Stadthalle, Rostock, Germany	For IBF female featherweight title
40	Loss	32–5–3	(Germany) Nina Meinke	MD	12	21 Sep 2024	Sporthalle, Hamburg, Germany	For vacant IBF female featherweight title
39	Win	32–4–3	(Argentina) Lucrecia Anabella Manzur	TKO	3 (10)	23 Sep 2023	Salon de los Deportes, Villa Maria, Argentina	Retained Federacion Argentina de Box Argentinian female featherweight title
38	Win	31–4–3	(Argentina) Daniela Barbara Rivero	TKO	5 (10)	22 Apr 2023	Club Atletico Timbuense, Timbues, Argentina	For vacant Federacion Argentina de Box Argentinian female featherweight title
37	Win	30–4–3	(Argentina) Lilian Dolores Silva	UD	8	4 Feb 2023	Asociación Vecinal Barrio Díaz Vélez, San Lorenzo, Argentina	
36	Loss	29–4–3	(Puerto Rico) Amanda Serrano	KO	9 (10), 1:33	25 Mar 2021	Plaza del Quinto Centenario, San Juan, Puerto Rico	For WBC, WBO, and vacant IBO female featherweight titles
35	Win	29–3–3	(Argentina) Cintia Gisela Castillo	TKO	10 (10)	4 Dec 2020	Asociacion Bomberos Voluntarios de Zavalla, Zavella, Argentina	Won vacant IBF female junior featherweight title
34	Win	28–3–3	(Venezuela) Alys Sanchez	KO	9 (10)	28 Feb 2020	Olimpico Football, Villa Gonernador Gálvez, Argentina	Retained WBO female bantamweight title
33	Win	27–3–3	(Argentina) Marianela Soledad Ramirez	UD	10	14 Dec 2019	Olimpico Football, Villa Gonernador Gálvez, Argentina	Retained WBO female bantamweight title
32	Win	26–3–3	(Mexico) Valeria Perez	RTD	8 (10)	27 Jul 2019	Club Sportivo America, Rosario, Argentina	Retained WBO female bantamweight title
31	Win	25–3–3	(Mexico) Irma Garcia	UD	10	30 Mar 2019	Club Huracán, Buenos Aires, Argentina	Retained WBO female bantamweight title
30	Win	24–3–3	(Colombia) Yollis Marrugo Franco	RTD	4 (10)	29 Dec 2018	Club Atlético Talleres, Villa Gobernador Gálvez, Argentina	Retained WBO female bantamweight title
29	Win	23–3–3	(Argentina) Marcela Acuña	UD	10	13 Apr 2018	Microestadio Municipal, Buenos Aires, Argentina	Won IBF junior featherweight title
28	Win	22–3–3	(Argentina) Soledad del Valle Frias	UD	10	20 Oct 2017	Estadio Olímpico, Palpalá, Argentina	Won vacant WBO female bantamweight title
27	Draw	21–3–3	(Argentina) Paola Pamela Benavidez	SD	10	17 Jun 2017	Club Talleres, Arroyo Seco, Argentina	Retained WBO female super flyweight title
26	Win	21–3–2	(Mexico) Mariana Juárez	UD	10	27 Aug 2016	Arena Coliseo, Mexico City, Mexico	
25	Win	20–3–2	(Argentina) Marisa Joana Portillo	UD	10	24 Jun 2016	Club Pro Educación Física Matienzo, Rufino, Argentina	Retained WBO female super flyweight title
24	Win	19–3–2	(Argentina) Paola Pamela Benavidez	UD	8	7 May 2016	Estadio FAB, Buenos Aires, Argentina	
23	Win	18–3–2	(Japan) Tomomi Takano	KO	4 (10)	11 Nov 2015	Korakuen Hall, Tokyo, Japan	Retained WBO female super flyweight title
22	Win	17–3–2	(Argentina) Vanesa Lorena Taborda	MD	10	31 Jan 2015	Club Atletico Alba Argentina, Maciel, Argentina	Retained WBO female super flyweight title
21	Loss	16–3–2	(Argentina) Yésica Bopp	UD	10	26 Apr 2014	Polideportivo Carlos Magalot, Río Grande, Argentina	For vacant WBO female flyweight title
20	Win	16–2–2	(Peru) Linda Laura Lecca	TKO	8 (10)	4 Jan 2014	Piso de los Deportes, Buenos Aires, Argentina	Won vacant WBO female super flyweight title
19	Win	15–2–2	(Mexico) Judith Rodriguez	UD	10	13 Sep 2013	GAP Disco, Buenos Aires, Argentina	Retained WBA interim female super flyweight title
18	Win	14–2–2	(Colombia) Neisi Torres	TKO	1 (10)	31 May 2013	Gimnasio Pedro Estremador, Bariloche, Argentina	Won vacant WBO female bantamweight title
17	Win	13–2–2	(Mexico) Guadalupe Martínez Guzmán	UD	10	12 Apr 2013	Centro Cosmopolita Unión y Progreso, Roldán, Argentina	Retained WBA interim female super flyweight title
16	Win	12–2–2	(Argentina) Romina Elizabeth Alcantra	UD	10	8 Feb 2013	Club El Ciclo, Rosario, Argentina	Retained WBA interim female super flyweight title
15	Win	11–2–2	(Argentina) Anahi Yolanda Salles	UD	6	22 Dec 2012	Club Sportivo America, Rosario, Argentina	
14	Win	10–2–2	(Colombia) Olga Julio	TKO	2 (10)	24 Aug 2012	Club Sportivo America, Rosario, Argentina	Retained WBA interim female super flyweight title
13	Win	9–2–2	(Mexico) Judith Rodriguez	UD	10	12 May 2012	Club America, Buenos Aires, Argentina	Won WBA interim female super flyweight title
12	Win	8–2–2	(Venezuela) Mayerlin Rivas	MD	10	31 Mar 2012	Club Atlético Talleres, Villa Gobernador Gálvez, Argentina	Won WBA interim female bantamweight title
11	Win	7–2–2	(Argentina) Marta Soledad Juncos	TKO	2 (6)	14 Jan 2012	Polideportivo Municipal, Buenos Aires, Argentina	
10	Win	6–2–2	(Argentina) Norma Elizabeth Diaz Caucota	UD	6	19 Nov 2011	Club Independiente, Córdoba, Argentina	
9	Loss	5–2–2	(Argentina) Yésica Bopp	UD	10	24 Sep 2011	Polideportivo Posta del Retamo, Junín, Argentina	For WBA female light flyweight title
8	Win	5–1–2	(Argentina) Edith Soledad Matthysse	MD	6	20 Aug 2011	Ce.De.M. N° 1, Buenos Aires, Argentina	
7	Loss	4–1–2	(Argentina) Edith Soledad Matthysse	UD	10	15 Apr 2011	Estudiantes de Bahía Blanca, Buenos Aires, Argentina	
6	Win	4–0–2	(Argentina) Cristina del Valle Pacheco	UD	4	9 Feb 2011	Salón Municipal, Córdoba, Argentina	
5	Win	3–0–2	(Argentina) Graciela Ines De Luca	UD	4	13 Nov 2010	Club Sportivo America, Rosario, Argentina	
4	Draw	2–0–2	(Argentina) Betiana Patricia Vinas	MD		9 Oct 2010	Polideportivo San Pedro, San Martín, Argentina	
3	Draw	2–0–1	(Argentina) Betiana Patricia Vinas	MD	4	17 Jul 2010	Polideportivo Vicente Polimeni, Las Heras, Argentina	
2	Win	2–0	(Bolivia) Maria Terriaza	KO	2 (4)	23 Apr 2010	Club El Ciclon, Rosario, Argentina	
1	Win	1–0	(Argentina) Roxana Virginia Baron	SD	4	26 Mar 2010	Estadio Pedro Estremador, Bariloche, Argentina	

Sporting positions
Major world boxing titles
Vacant Title last held by Janeth Perez	WBA bantamweight champion Interim title 31 March 2012 – May 2012; Vacated	Vacant Title next held by Sabrina Maribel Pérez
Vacant Title last held by Carolina Marcela Gutierrez	WBA super flyweight champion Interim title 12 May 2012 – November 2013; Vacated	Vacant Title next held by Linda Laura Lecca
Vacant Title last held by Carolina Raquel Duer	WBO super flyweight champion 4 January 2014 – October 2017; Vacated	Vacant Title next held by Raja Amasheh
Vacant Title last held by Amanda Serrano	WBO bantamweight champion 20 October 2017 – present	Incumbent
Preceded by Marcela Acuña	IBF junior featherweight champion 13 April 2018 – July 2018; Vacated	Vacant Title next held by Marcela Acuña
