= Ana Julaton =

American boxer and mixed martial artist (born 1983)

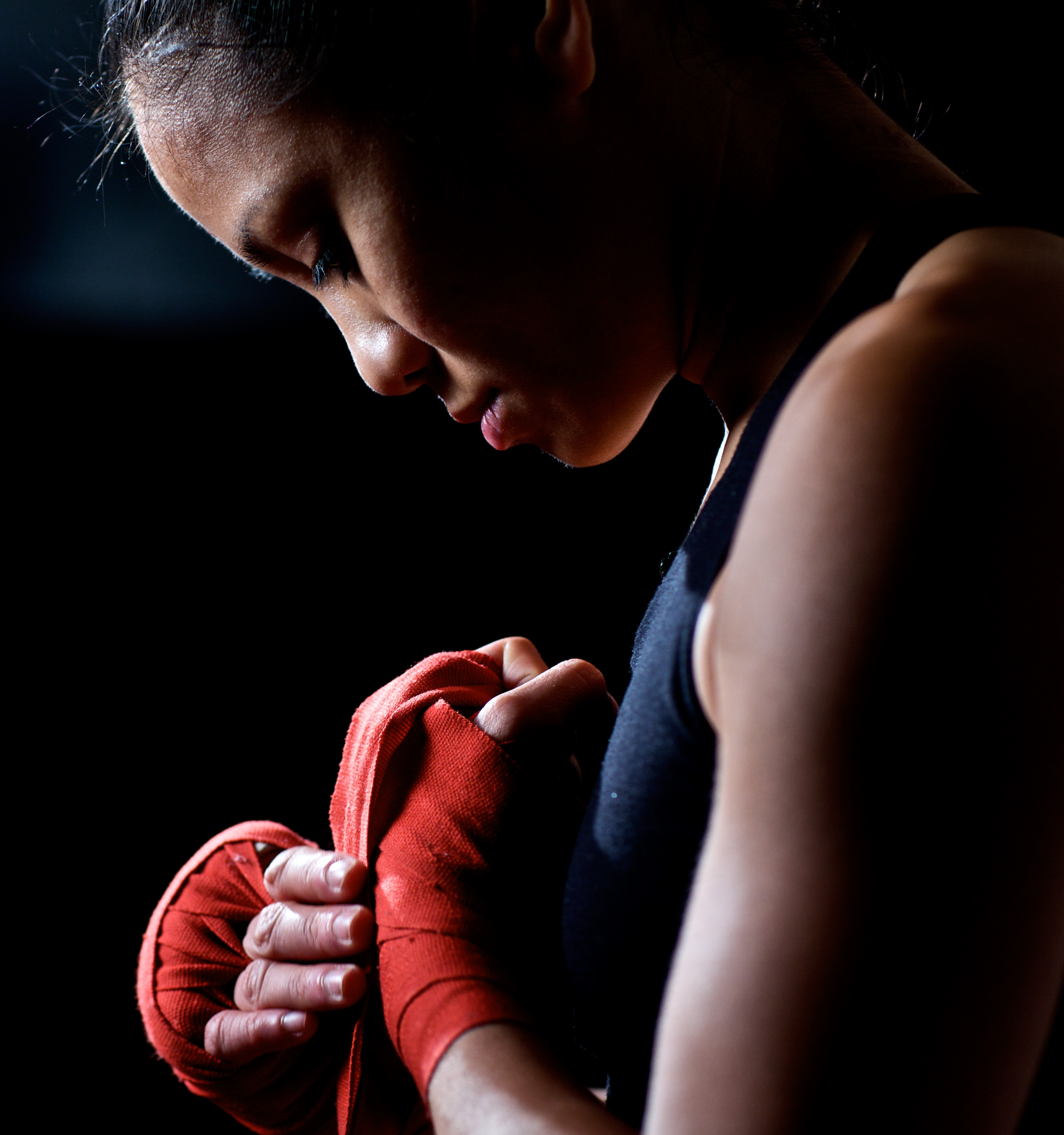
- Born: November 28, 1983 (age 41); San Francisco, California, U.S.
- Nickname: "The Hurricane"
- Height: 5 ft 5 in (165 cm)
- Weight: 125 lb (57 kg; 9 st)
- Division: Super Bantamweight (Boxing); Flyweight (MMA)}
- Style: Orthodox

Professional boxing record
- Total: 21
- Wins: 14
- By knockout: 2
- Losses: 4
- Draws: 3

Mixed martial arts record
- Total: 6
- Wins: 2
- By knockout: 1
- By decision: 1
- Losses: 4
- By decision: 4

Other information
- Boxing record from BoxRec
- Mixed martial arts record from Sherdog

Luciana Julaton is an American former professional boxer and mixed martial artist. She was the first to win the Women's WBO Super Bantamweight and IBA Super Bantamweight titles. Nicknamed "The Hurricane", she is also one of the quickest boxers ever to win a world title, having fought just five previous professional bouts before winning the IBA Super Bantamweight title.

In mixed martial arts, Julaton competed for ONE Fighting Championship and Bellator MMA.

Julaton retired from combat sports in March 2018.

== Boxing career ==
=== Early career ===
Julaton was born in San Francisco, California. Despite her father making her train in martial arts when she was little, she had no interest in boxing whatsoever. It was only while working as a bok-fu instructor, at the West Wind Martial Arts and Boxing School in Berkeley, California, that Julaton was introduced to boxing through a lecture session organized by her now trainer-manager, Angelo Reyes.

=== Amateur career ===
Julaton made her amateur boxing debut in 2004, managing to win silver in the San Francisco Golden Gloves despite having officially trained for just two weeks. After delivering a good performance at the National Golden Gloves in 2005, Julaton would be taken under the wing of two-division world champion Carina Moreno and trainer Rick Noble, further improving her craft.

By 2007, she was ranked second among all female amateur boxers in the US, and took part in the unsuccessful campaign to include women's boxing in the 2008 Beijing Olympics.

=== Professional career ===
At this point, Julaton decided to turn pro, and approached veteran trainer Freddie Roach. Impressing Roach with her work ethic — even sparring against male fighters — Julaton eventually became part of Roach's large stable of boxers, alongside Filipino boxing legend Manny Pacquiao and former world champion Gerry Peñalosa.

She was scheduled to make her pro debut against Hondi Hernandez on the undercard of the Pacquiao-Barrera rematch in October 2007, but her fight was canceled when Hernandez failed to make weight. Julaton instead fought and won against Rita Valentini a month later. This was followed by several other successful fights, culminating in her first title win against Kelsey “The Road Warrior” Jeffries on September 12, 2009, for the vacant International Boxing Association super bantamweight title in women's boxing.

Now trained by Nonito Donaire Sr., father of boxer Nonito Donaire Jr., Julaton followed up that win by defeating Donna Biggers and becoming the first female World Boxing Organization Super Bantamweight champion on December 4, 2009. Her next fight was on March 27, 2010, against boxer Lisa Brown for the vacant World Boxing Association junior featherweight title.

== Mixed martial arts career ==
=== ONE Fighting Championship ===
Julaton signed a contract with ONE Fighting Championship to compete in women's mixed martial arts. She is a black belt in Bok Fu, an aggressive martial arts system that combines the Five Animals style of Kung Fu – Tiger, Crane, Panther, Snake, and Dragon – with Kenpo Karate and Shotokan. She is also a black belt in Taekwondo

Julaton made her debut at ONE FC: Rise of Heroes on May 2, 2014, against Aya-Saeid Saber. She was successful in her debut, winning the fight via TKO in the third round.

On August 29, 2014, Julaton suffered her first loss to Ann Osman of Malaysia at ONE FC: Reign of Champions.

On December 5, 2014, Ana defeated Walaa Abbas of Egypt in ONE FC: Warrior's Way at the Mall of Asia Arena in the Philippines. Julaton improved her mixed martial arts record to 2–1.

On December 11, 2015, Julaton lost to Irina Mazepa of Russia at ONE Championship: Spirit of Champions. It would be her last fight in ONE.

=== Bellator MMA ===
In September 2017 it was announced Ana Julaton was signed to Bellator MMA.

Julaton faced Lisa Blaine at Bellator 185 on October 20, 2017. She lost the fight via split decision.

Julaton faced Heather Hardy on February 16, 2018, at Bellator 194. She lost the fight via unanimous decision.

She retired from mixed martial arts and combat sports the following month with an MMA record of 2–4.

== Achievements ==
=== Professional career ===
2009

- WBO Super Bantamweight World Champion
- IBA Super Bantamweight World Champion

=== Amateur Record ===
2007

- Rank No. 2, United States Nationwide Rankings
- Silver Medalist, United States Championship
- Gold Medalist, San Francisco Championship

2006

- Champion, National Diamond Belt
- California State Champion
- Champion, San Francisco Golden Gloves
- Rank No, . 5 Quarter-finalist, United States Championship
- Silver Medalist, Nor Cal Championship

2005

- Rank No. 6, United States Nationwide Rankings
- Bronze Medalist, National Golden Gloves
- Champion, San Francisco Diamond Belt
- Best Fight of the Tournament and Quarter-finalist, National PAL Championships
- Silver Medalist, San Francisco Golden Gloves
- Quarter-finalist, United States Championship
- Silver Medalist, Nor Cal Championship

2004

- Silver Medalist, San Francisco Golden Gloves

== Professional boxing record ==
21 fights	14 wins	4 losses
By knockout	2	0
By decision	12	4
Draws	3	

No.	Result	Record	Opponent	Type	Round, time	Date	Location	Notes
21	Draw	14–4–3	Maria Jose Nunez	PTS	8 (8)	2017-03-25	Unidad Deportiva, Campeche, Mexico	
20	Draw	14–4–2	Karla Valenzuela Garcia	PTS	6 (6)	2016-08-12	Salon Diamante, Mérida, Mexico	
19	Win	14–4–1	Yolanda Segura	UD	6 (6)	2015-03-06	Hotel Holiday Inn, Durango, Mexico	
18	Win	13–4–1	Perla Hernandez Hidalgo	MD	10 (10)	2013-11-01	Auditorio Morelos, Progreso, Mexico	
17	Loss	12–4–1	Celina Salazar	UD	10 (10)	2013-08-17	Plaza de Toros, Cancún, Mexico	
16	Win	12–3–1	Abigail Ramos	TKO	1 (10)	2012-08-03	Polifuncional Pancho Villa, Kanasín, Mexico	
15	Win	11–3–1	Yolanda Segura	UD	10 (10)	2012-05-04	Polifuncional Pancho Villa, Kanasín, Mexico	
14	Loss	10–3–1	Yésica Marcos	UD	10 (10)	2012-03-16	Teatro Griego Juan Pablo Segundo, San Martín, Argentina	Lost WBO super-bantamweight title
13	Win	10–2–1	Jessica Villafranca	UD	10 (10)	2011-09-30	Polifuncional Pancho Villa, Kanasín, Mexico	Retained WBO super-bantamweight title
12	Win	9–2–1	Angel Gladney	UD	8 (8)	2011-06-24	Dade County Auditorium, Miami, Florida, U.S.	
11	Win	8–2–1	Franchesca Alcanter	UD	10 (10)	2011-02-25	Craneway Pavilion, Richmond, California, U.S.	Retained WBO super-bantamweight title
10	Win	7–2–1	Maria Elena Villalobos	SD	10 (10)	2010-06-30	Casino Rama, Rama, Ontario, Canada	Retained IBA super-bantamweight title; Won vacant WBO super-bantamweight title
9	Loss	6–2–1	Lisa Brown	UD	10 (10)	2010-03-27	Casino Rama, Rama, Ontario, Canada	For vacant WBA super-bantamweight title
8	Win	6–1–1	Donna Biggers	UD	10 (10)	2009-12-04	HP Pavilion, San Jose, California, U.S.	Retained IBA super-bantamweight title; Won inaugural WBO super-bantamweight title
7	Win	5–1–1	Kelsey Jeffries	MD	10 (10)	2009-09-12	HP Pavilion, San Jose, California, U.S.	Won vacant IBA super-bantamweight title
6	Loss	4–1–1	Dominga Olivo	SD	8 (8)	2008-08-21	Tachi Palace, Lemoore, California, U.S.	For vacant WBC International super-bantamweight title
5	Draw	4–0–1	Johanna Mendez	SD	6 (6)	2008-07-05	Planet Hollywood, Paradise, Nevada, U.S.	
4	Win	4–0	Salina Jordan	KO	1 (4)	2008-06-26	Tachi Palace, Lemoore, California, U.S.	
3	Win	3–0	Clara De la Torre	UD	4 (4)	2008-03-13	The Joint, Paradise, Nevada, U.S.	
2	Win	2–0	Carley Batey	SD	6 (6)	2008-02-07	Pechanga Resort & Casino, Temecula, California, U.S.	
1	Win	1–0	Margherita Valentini	UD	4 (4)	2007-11-02	Morongo Casino, Resort & Spa, Cabazon, California, U.S.	

== Mixed martial arts record ==
Professional record breakdown
6 matches	2 wins	4 losses
By knockout	1	0
By decision	1	4

Res.	Record	Opponent	Method	Event	Date	Round	Time	Location	Notes
Loss	2–4	Heather Hardy	Decision (unanimous)	Bellator 194	February 16, 2018	3	5:00	Uncasville, Connecticut, United States	
Loss	2–3	Lisa Blaine	Decision (split)	Bellator 185	October 20, 2017	3	5:00	Uncasville, Connecticut, United States	
Loss	2–2	Irina Mazepa	Decision (unanimous)	ONE: Spirit of Champions	December 11, 2015	3	5:00	Manila, Philippines	
Win	2–1	Walaa Abas Mohamed Kamaly	Decision (unanimous)	ONE FC: Warrior's Way	December 5, 2014	3	5:00	Pasay, Philippines	
Loss	1–1	Ann Osman	Decision (split)	ONE FC : Reign of Champions	August 29, 2014	3	5:00	Dubai, United Arab Emirates	
Win	1–0	Aya-Saeid Saber	TKO (punches and elbows)	ONE FC: Rise of Heroes	May 2, 2014	3	3:59	Pasay, Philippines	

== See also ==
- List of female boxers
- List of Filipino world boxing champions

Sporting positions
Minor world boxing titles
Vacant Title last held by Ada Vélez	IBA female super-bantamweight champion September 12, 2009 – 2011; Vacated	Vacant Title next held by Shelly Vincent
Major world boxing titles
Inaugural champion	WBO female super-bantamweight champion December 4, 2009 – 2009; Vacated	Vacant Title next held by Herself
Vacant Title last held by Herself	WBO female super-bantamweight champion June 30, 2010 – March 16, 2012	Succeeded by Yésica Marcos
