= María Cecilia Román =

Argentine boxer

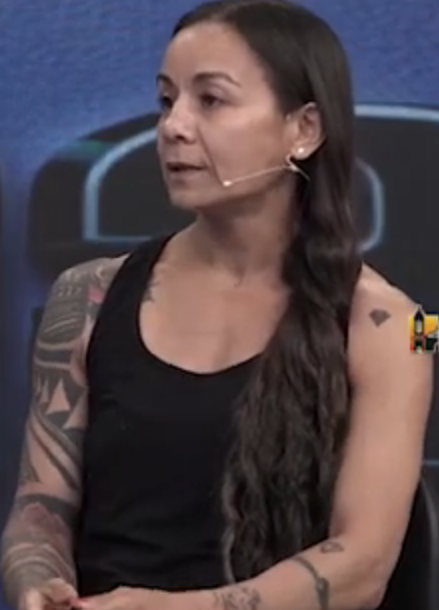
- Cecilia Román in 2025

Personal information
- Born: 21 January 1983 (age 43) Villa Mallea, San Juan, Argentina
- Weight: Bantamweight

Boxing career
- Stance: Orthodox

Boxing record
- Total fights: 28
- Wins: 17
- Win by KO: 0
- Losses: 8
- Draws: 2
- No contests: 1

Mariá Cecilia Román (born 21 January 1983) is an Argentine professional boxer who held the IBF female bantamweight title between 4 August 2017 and 26 March 2022.

== Professional career ==
Román made her professional debut on 13 May 2011, scoring a four-round unanimous decision (UD) victory over Yessika Munoz at the Estadio Aldo Cantoni in San Juan, Argentina.

After compiling a record of 9–4–1, Román faced Anahi Yolanda Salles for the vacant Argentine female bantamweight title, with the bout taking place on 10 September 2016 at the Club Social y Deportivo Aberastain in Pocitos, Argentina. Román defeated Salles via UD over ten rounds, with the judges' scorecards reading 99.5–96.5, 99–96 and 98–95.

Her next fight came on 4 August 2017 at the Salon Tattersall in San Isidro, against Carolina Duer for the IBF female bantamweight title. Román captured the title via split decision (SD), with two judges scoring the bout 96–94 and 95–94 in favour of Román, while the third scored it 96–94 to Duer.

The first defence of her newly acquired title came four months later in December against Ana Maria Lozano. Román scored a disqualification (DQ) win in the second round after she suffered a cut on her forehead following a headbutt from Lozano in the opening round. She defeated Lozano via UD in an April 2018 rematch before defeating Duer for a second time in August via SD. Her final fight of 2018 was a six-round non-title bout against Vanesa Taborda in December at the Estadio Aldo Cantoni in San Juan. The referee called a halt to the fight in the second round after Román suffered a cut to her forehead resulting from an accidental clash of heads. The fight was ruled a no contest (NC).

She defended her title twice in 2019, scoring UD wins over Valeria Perez in March and Julieta Cardozo in August.

Román lost her title to Ebanie Bridges suffering a unanimous decision defeat at the First Direct Arena, Leeds, England on 26 March 2022 in what was her eighth championship defense.

== Professional boxing record ==
28 fights	17 wins	8 losses
By knockout	0	1
By decision	16	7
By disqualification	1	0
Draws	2	
No contests	1	

No.	Result	Record	Opponent	Type	Round, time	Date	Location	Notes
28	Draw	17–7–2 (1)	(Argentina) Lilian Dolores Silva	MD	4	19 August 2023	Estadio F.A.B., Buenos Aires, Argentina	
27	Loss	17–8–1 (1)	(United States) Adelaida Ruiz	KO	8 (8)	2 June 2023	(United States) Pechanga Resort & Casino, Temecula, California, USA	
26	Win	17–7–1 (1)	(Argentina) Eliana Vanesa Orecchia	UD	6	11 Nov 2022	Club Atletico El Palomar, El Palomar, Argentina	
25	Loss	16–7–1 (1)	(United Kingdom) Ellie Scotney	UD	10	21 May 2022	(United Kingdom) The O2 Arena, London, England	For WBA Inter-Continental Female Super-bantamweight Title
24	Loss	16–6–1 (1)	(Australia) Ebanie Bridges	UD	10	26 Mar 2022	First Direct Arena, Leeds, England, United Kingdom	Lost IBF female bantamweight title
23	Win	16–5–1 (1)	(Argentina) Daniela Barbara Rivero	UD	10	26 Nov 2021	Estadio Marcelo Garcia, Pocito, San Juan, Argentina	Retained IBF female bantamweight title
22	Loss	15–5–1 (1)	(United States) Melissa Odessa Parker	MD	8	20 Feb 2021	(United States) Caribe Royale, Orlando, Florida, USA	
21	Win	15–4–1 (1)	(Argentina) Julieta Cardozo	UD	10	16 Aug 2019	Estadio Aldo Cantoni, San Juan, Argentina	Retained IBF female bantamweight title
20	Win	14–4–1 (1)	(Mexico) Valeria Perez	UD	10	15 Mar 2019	Estadio Aldo Cantoni, San Juan, Argentina	Retained IBF female bantamweight title
19	NC	13–4–1 (1)	(Argentina) Vanesa Lorena Taborda	NC	2 (10)	21 Dec 2018	Estadio Aldo Cantoni, San Juan, Argentina	Retained IBF female bantamweight title; Fight stopped after Román cut from accidental head clash
18	Win	13–4–1	(Argentina) Carolina Duer	SD	10	4 Aug 2018	Estadio Aldo Cantoni, San Juan, Argentina	Retained IBF female bantamweight title
17	Win	12–4–1	(Venezuela) Ana Maria Lozano	UD	10	14 Apr 2018	Club Julio Mocoroa, San Juan, Argentina	Retained IBF female bantamweight title
16	Win	11–4–1	(Venezuela) Ana Maria Lozano	DQ	2 (10)	15 Dec 2017	Estadio Aldo Cantoni, San Juan, Argentina	Retained IBF female bantamweight title; Lozano disqualified after Román cut from headbutt
15	Win	10–4–1	(Argentina) Carolina Duer	SD	10	4 Aug 2017	Salon Tattersall, San Isidro, Argentina	Won IBF female bantamweight title
14	Win	9–4–1	(Argentina) Anahi Yolanda Salles	UD	10	10 Sep 2016	Club Social y Deportivo Aberastain, Pocito, Argentina	Won vacant Argentine female bantamweight title
13	Win	8–4–1	(Argentina) Adriana Maldonado	UD	6	7 Jul 2016	San Juan, Argentina	
12	Win	7–4–1	(Argentina) Lilian Dolores Silva	UD	4	22 Apr 2016	Estadio Aldo Cantoni, San Juan, Argentina	
11	Win	6–4–1	(Argentina) Marta Soledad Juncos	UD	6	23 Mar 2016	Club Sportivo Unión, Altos de Sierra, Argentina	
10	Win	5–4–1	(Argentina) Marta Soledad Juncos	PTS	4	18 Sep 2015	Club Sportivo Palmira, San Juan, Argentina	
9	Win	4–4–1	(Argentina) Gloria Yancaqueo	MD	4	21 Aug 2015	Estadio Aldo Cantoni, San Juan, Argentina	
8	Win	3–4–1	(Argentina) Alejandra Morales	UD	4	10 Jul 2015	Club Sportivo Palmira, San Juan, Argentina	
7	Win	2–4–1	(Argentina) Johana Sanchez	UD	4	27 Mar 2015	Estadio Aldo Cantoni, San Juan, Argentina	
6	Draw	1–4–1	(Argentina) Marta Juncos	MD	4	20 Dec 2014	Sociedad Española, San Luis, Argentina	
5	Loss	1–4	(Argentina) Julieta Cardozo	SD	4	18 Jul 2014	Club Social y Cultural El Cruce, Malvinas Argentinas, Argentina	
4	Loss	1–3	(Argentina) Julieta Cardozo	UD	4	19 Apr 2014	Club Social y Cultural El Cruce, Malvinas Argentinas, Argentina	
3	Loss	1–2	(Argentina) Vanesa del Valle Calderon	UD	4	17 Aug 2012	Santiago del Estero, Argentina	
2	Loss	1–1	(Chile) Carolina Rodriguez	UD	6	20 Aug 2011	Gimnasio Club Mexico, Santiago, Chile	
1	Win	1–0	(Argentina) Yessika Munoz	UD	4	13 May 2011	Estadio Aldo Cantoni, San Juan, Argentina	
