= Lou DiBella =

American boxing promoter and minor league baseball team owner (born 1960)

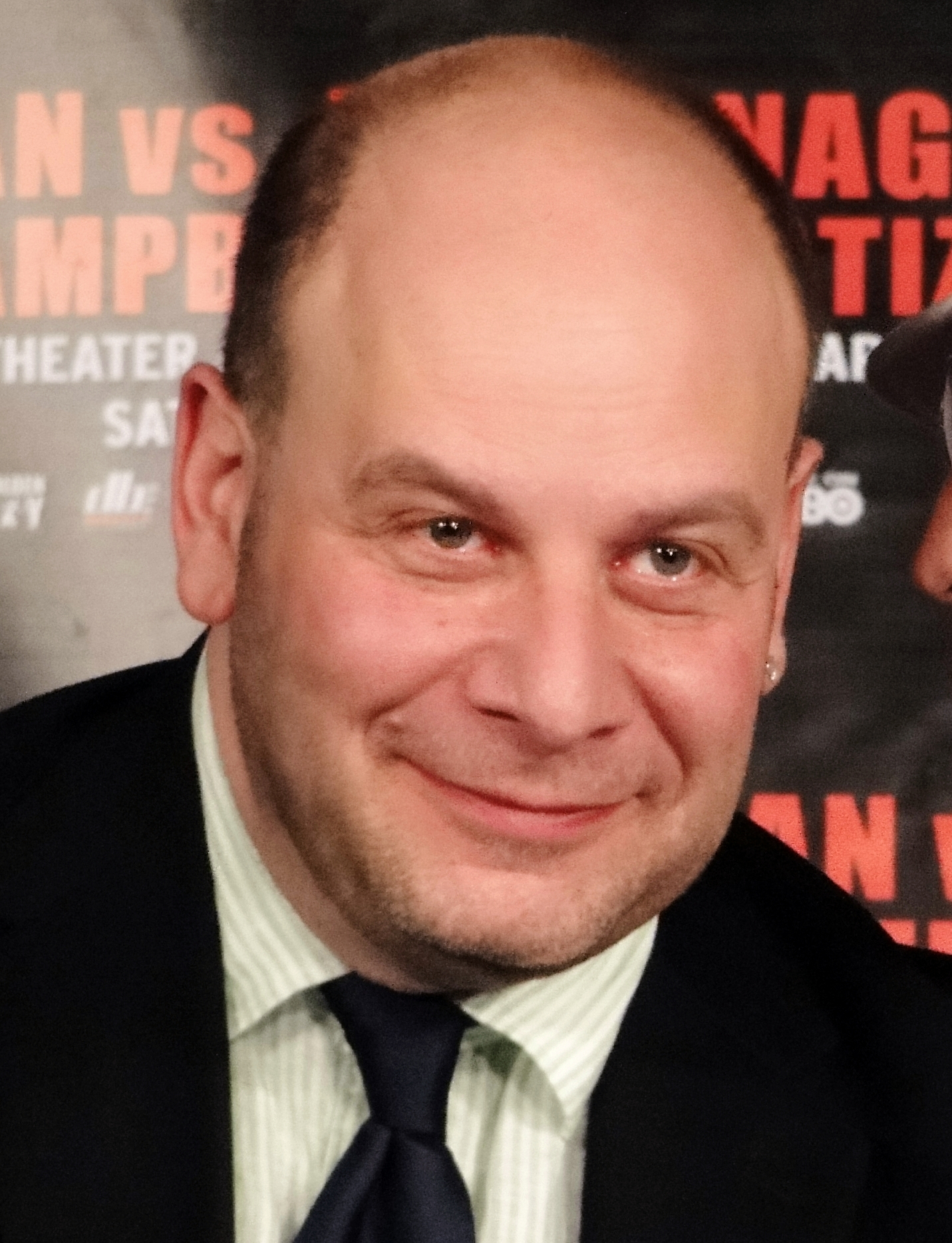
- DiBella in 2010
- Born: Louis John DiBella Jr. May 17, 1960 (age 66); New York City, U.S.
- Occupations: Boxing promoter Television/film producer

Louis John DiBella Jr. is an American boxing promoter, minor league baseball team owner and television/film producer.

== Education ==
DiBella was born in Brooklyn, New York City, and he is a graduate of Regis High School later having continued his education at Tufts University before pursuing a Juris Doctor degree at Harvard Law School.

== Career ==
=== Boxing promotion ===
DiBella was head of programming for HBO Sports for more than 10 years before starting his own promotional firm, DiBella Entertainment.

DiBella currently promotes the fighters Regis Prograis, Tevin Farmer, Sergiy Derevyanchenko, Ivan Baranchyk, Richard Commey, George Kambosos Jr. as well as prospects Oleksandr Teslenko and US Olympian Charles Conwell, among others. DiBella is an ardent supporter of women's boxing and his expanding roster of female fighters includes world champions Amanda Serrano and Alicia Napoleon as well as Heather Hardy, Shelly Vincent, Raquel Miller and Tiara Brown. He also promoted events that Deontay Wilder, the former WBC heavyweight champion, fights on.

Past boxers represented by DiBella Entertainment include former WBC Middleweight champion Sergio Martínez, former middleweight world champions Jermain Taylor and Bernard Hopkins, former junior welterweight titlist Paulie Malignaggi, former WBC welterweight champion Andre Berto and "Jo Jo" Dan.

DiBella was inducted into the International Women's Boxing Hall of Fame in the non-boxer category in 2024.

=== Producer ===
DiBella expanded his boxing empire producing television content and films. In 2007, he produced the documentary Magic Man, which depicted the life of Paulie Malignaggi and his rise in the world of boxing. The documentary had its television premiere on Showtime and was later aired in the United Kingdom leading up to the Malignaggi vs. Lovemore Ndou fight, where Malignaggi retained his title.

In 2008, DiBella added the credit of executive producer to his list of accomplishments with the 2009 film Love Ranch starring Helen Mirren and Joe Pesci. The film was directed by Taylor Hackford.

DiBella was also the associate producer on the film The Fighter, which was released in 2010 and based on the life of former DBE fighter "Irish" Micky Ward, starring Mark Wahlberg as Ward and Christian Bale as his trainer and brother Dickie Ecklund. The film won two Academy Awards for Best Supporting Actor and Best Supporting Actress.

DiBella then established the television and film production company BK Blu. In its first year, the company premiered the film Tapia at the LA Film Festival then later, premiered the documentary Maravilla at the Tribeca Film Festival, premiered the documentary Hardy at the DOC NYC Film Festival, and acquired the rights to a number of television and film projects currently in development. The Tapia documentary, which was co-executive produced by DiBella and Curtis "50 Cent" Jackson, premiered on HBO in December 2014.

=== Other ventures ===
As of May 5, 2017, DiBella also owns two minor league baseball teams, Tampa Bay Rays Double-A Southern League affiliate, the Montgomery Biscuits, and San Francisco Giants Double-A Eastern League affiliate, the Richmond Flying Squirrels. The Biscuits' home field is Dabos Park, while the Flying Squirrels play their home games at Richmond's CarMax Park.
