= Marcela Acuña =

Argentine boxer (born 1976)

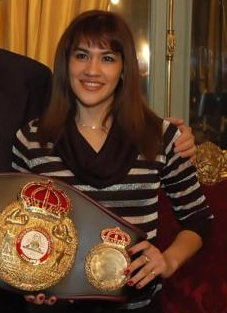
- Acuña in 2007

Personal information
- Nickname: La Tigresa
- Born: Marcela Eliana Acuña; 16 October 1976 (age 49) Formosa, Formosa, Argentina
- Height: 5 ft 4 1/2 in (164 cm)
- Weight: Super bantamweight; Featherweight; Light welterweight

Boxing career
- Stance: Orthodox

Boxing record
- Total fights: 66
- Wins: 53
- Win by KO: 20
- Losses: 10
- Draws: 3

Marcela Eliana Acuña (born 16 October 1976) is an Argentine professional boxer and part-time politician. She has held multiple super bantamweight world titles, including the IBF title since 2018; the WBA title from 2006 to 2008; the WBC title twice between 2008 and 2010; the WBO title from 2013 to 2014; the IBF title from 2016 to 2018; and the WBA interim featherweight title in 2016.

== Early life ==
Acuña enjoyed boxing from a very early age. At the age of seven, she visited a boxing gym for the first time. Her first trainer, Ramon Chaparro, would many years later become her husband.

Marcela Acuña became an accomplished martial arts fighter before she decided to box for money. At the age of twelve, she had earned a black belt and she became South America's champion in her division by the age of fourteen. She made sixteen successful title defenses.

She had to retire from karate due to pregnancy. In 1995, she and Chaparro had their first son. After some time away from combat sports, Acuña decided that she would return, only this time, she would compete in boxing.

== Professional boxing career ==
Acuña made her professional debut on 5 December 1997 against Christy Martin in Pompano Beach, Florida, on an undercard that was headlined by Johnny Tapia's world championship defense against Puerto Rico's Andy Agosto and which was shown nationally across the United States. Acuña was dropped in round ten, but she rose and finished the bout on her feet. Despite losing a unanimous decision by scores of 100-90 and 99-90 (twice), Acuña's performance was hailed by many fans and critics alike, considering that this was her first professional boxing bout.

In just her second professional fight she met Lucia Rijker on 25 September 1998, at Ledyard, Connecticut, for the vacant IBO super lightweight title. Acuña was knocked out in five rounds.

After losing her first two fights, Acuña stepped away from boxing.

=== Return to boxing ===
Acuña returned to boxing in 2001, and she and her rival, Jamillia Lawrence of New Jersey, made Argentine boxing history when they participated in the first ever women's boxing fight to be sanctioned by the Argentine boxing commission. Acuña got her first win, with a four-round split decision over the American at Buenos Aires, on 12 February of that year.

On 1 June, she obtained a six-round unanimous decision win over Luz Marina Sanabria Ledesma of Colombia, at Formosa.

Twenty eight days later, she got her first knockout win, when she defeated Uruguay's Andrea Pereyra in only two rounds.

On 11 August, she returned to Buenos Aires, to defeat Yolanda Marrugo, dropping her twice, on her way to a six-round unanimous decision.

On September 21, she fought at Carlos Monzón's birthplace, Santa Fe, when she was rematched with Pereyra. Acuña knocked out Pereyra in five rounds, and Pereyra required hospitalization after this fight. Acuña was awarded the "La Opinion's 80th anniversary" trophy that night.

On 12 October she knocked out Ana Dos Santos in two rounds, for her last appearance of 2001.

Her first fight of 2002 was preceded by much media hype. She was challenged by famous fitness instructor Patricia Quirico, who herself was making her professional debut when she boxed Acuña.

If for nothing else, the fight was widely expected because Quirico was a well known personality with developed body strength, who helped fan interest for the fight develop when she began to threaten Acuña through the media. Although she was 40 years old already, she seemed to feel an authentic dislike towards Acuña, and fans across Argentina spoke about the fight on the weeks prior to the event. The fact Quirico had participated in twenty three exhibition matches, as well as in karate and baseball also helped fan interest grow.

They met on 19 January 2002, at Buenos Aires. Acuña scored one of the quickest knockouts in boxing history, when she landed a right to Quirico's chin right after the first bell rang, and followed it with a left that sent Quirico to the floor. Quirico was counted out and Acuña officially won the fight at fourteen seconds of round one. The win earned her the Argentine Featherweight title.

On 1 March she had to fight one of her closest friends, Carmen Montiel, to defend her Argentina title. Acuña outpointed Montiel over ten rounds.

Next, she would have had her second world title try, on 6 April against Panama's Damaris Pinock Ortega, for the vacant WIBA title. The 2002 Argentine economic crisis, however, forced for the fight to be postponed.

On 29 June she and Montiel had a rematch, and Acuña again prevailed, by an eight-round unanimous decision.

=== World championships ===
Acuña then lost weight, going down all the way to the Super Bantamweight division to get her second try at becoming a world champion. In what was the first ever women's boxing world championship fight to be staged in Argentina, Acuña lost a split decision to champion Alicia Ashley.

Acuña then decided to take another two-year lay-off, but she had also decided to stay around the Super Bantamweight division's weight limit, because she wanted to fight in that division from there on. And when she returned for the second time, on 21 February 2003, she knocked out former Regina Halmich challenger Lourdes Gonzalez in two rounds to win the Argentine Super Bantamweight title.

On 10 May she fought in a place where boxing matches are rare: Tierra del Fuego, where she knocked out Ana Davila Ferreira in two rounds.

Then came a rematch with Ashley. On her third world title try, Acuña lost to Ashley for the second time, this time by a ten-round unanimous decision, on 14 June.

On 22 August she and her friend Carmen Montiel met for the third time, and Acuña again beat Montiel on points, this time in six rounds. This victory set up the stage for Acuña's fourth world title try.

On 6 December, she and Panamanian Pinock Ortega finally got to meet, and Acuña became world champion when she knocked out Ortega in the sixth round for the vacant WIBA Super Bantamweight title.

On 26 May 2004, she made her first world championship defense, knocking out Daysi Padilla in the first round. Padilla, who had former world champion Ricardo Cardona at her corner, also required a short stay at a hospital.

On 11 September 2004, Acuña knocked out Ana Camilla Santos in the third round of a non-title bout.

On 22 January 2005, she knocked out Maria Elena Miranda in three rounds to win the WIBA's vacant world Featherweight title, at Formosa.

In May 2019 she fought former world champion Jackie Nava to a draw.

In October 2023 she lost to former world champion Sarah Mahfoud, via unanimous decision.

== Professional boxing record ==
66 fights	53 wins	10 losses
By knockout	20	1
By decision	33	9
Draws	3	

No.	Result	Record	Opponent	Type	Round, time	Date	Location	Notes
66	Draw	53–10–3	Natalia Josefina Alderete	SD	8 (8)	2024-04-12	Club Defensores de Villa Lujan, San Miguel de Tucumán, Argentina	
65	Loss	53–10–2	Sarah Mahfoud	UD	10 (10)	2023-10-07	Royal Arena, Copenhagen, Denmark	For WBC Silver featherweight title
64	Win	53–9–2	Lucrecia Belen Arrieta	UD	10 (10)	2023-07-21	Amérian Hotel Casino Gala, Resistencia, Argentina	
63	Win	52–9–2	Natalia Josefina Alderete	UD	8 (8)	2023-03-10	Estadio Pedro Estremador, Bariloche, Argentina	
62	Loss	51–9–2	Débora Dionicius	UD	10 (10)	2022-12-23	Club Sarmiento, Resistencia, Argentina	For vacant WBO super-bantamweight title
61	Win	51–8–2	Laura Soledad Griffa	UD	10 (10)	2022-09-24	Club Ferrocarril Midland, Libertad, Argentina	Won vacant Argentine featherweight title
60	Loss	50–8–2	Débora Dionicius	UD	10 (10)	2021-11-20	Estadio Luna Park, Buenos Aires, Argentina	For interim WBO featherweight title
59	Win	50–7–2	Natalia Josefina Alderete	UD	6 (6)	2021-09-25	Complejo Termal Vertiente de la Concordia, Concordia, Argentina	
58	Draw	49–7–2	Jackie Nava	MD	10 (10)	2019-05-25	Estadio de Beisbol Agustin Flores Contreras, Puerto Vallarta, Mexico	
57	Win	49–7–1	Yenifer Rodriguez	KO	5 (10)	2018-12-14	Club Atletico Independiente, La Rioja, Argentina	Retained IBF super-bantamweight title
56	Win	48–7–1	Mayerlin Rivas	SD	10 (10)	2018-10-19	Polideportivo Delmi, Salta, Argentina	Retained IBF super-bantamweight title
55	Win	47–7–1	Laura Soledad Griffa	UD	10 (10)	2018-08-10	Polideportivo Fray Mamerto Esquiú, Catamarca, Argentina	Won vacant IBF super-bantamweight title
54	Loss	46–7–1	Daniela Romina Bermúdez	UD	10 (10)	2018-04-13	Microestadio Municipal, Hurlingham, Argentina	Lost IBF super-bantamweight title
53	Win	46–6–1	Shannon O'Connell	UD	10 (10)	2017-06-16	Ce.De.M. N° 2, Caseros, Argentina	Retained IBF super-bantamweight title
52	Win	45–6–1	Yésica Marcos	KO	10 (10)	2016-12-16	Parque Industrial de Desarrollo Productivo, Cuartel V, Argentina	Won vacant IBF super-bantamweight title
51	Win	44–6–1	Brenda Karen Carabajal	UD	10 (10)	2016-09-09	Ce.De.M. N° 2, Caseros, Argentina	Retained WBA featherweight title
50	Win	43–6–1	Mayra Alejandra Gomez	UD	10 (10)	2016-05-07	Estadio F.A.B., Buenos Aires, Argentina	Won interim WBA featherweight title
49	Win	42–6–1	Edith Soledad Matthysse	UD	10 (10)	2014-08-23	Sociedad Alemana de Gimnasia, José León Suárez, Argentina	Retained WBO super-bantamweight title
48	Win	41–6–1	Estrella Valverde	TKO	6 (10)	2014-03-28	Anfiteatro Municipal, Villa María, Argentina	Retained WBO super-bantamweight title
47	Win	40–6–1	Halanna Dos Santos	UD	10 (10)	2013-10-25	Club Salto Uruguayo, Salto, Uruguay	Won vacant WBO super-bantamweight title
46	Win	39–6–1	Melissa Hernández	UD	10 (10)	2013-07-13	Club Defensores de Villa Lujan, San Miguel de Tucumán, Argentina	
45	Win	38–6–1	Edith Soledad Matthysse	UD	10 (10)	2013-05-10	Auditorio Presidente Néstor Kirchner, Tapiales, Argentina	
44	Draw	37–6–1	Yésica Marcos	SD	10 (10)	2013-01-25	Teatro Griego Juan Pablo Segundo, San Martín, Argentina	For WBA & WBO super-bantamweight titles
43	Loss	37–6	Carolina Duer	UD	10 (10)	2012-12-21	Club Universitario, La Plata, Argentina	
42	Win	37–5	Betiana Patricia Vinas	TD	9 (10)	2012-08-17	Club Caja Popular, San Miguel de Tucumán, Argentina	Retained WBC Silver super-bantamweight title
41	Win	36–5	Maria Elena Villalobos	UD	10 (10)	2012-05-19	Salón de los Bomberos Voluntarios, General Villegas, Argentina	Won vacant WBC Silver super-bantamweight title
40	Win	35–5	Rosilete Dos Santos	TKO	10 (10)	2010-08-20	Estadio Cincuentenario, Formosa, Argentina	Retained WBC super-bantamweight title
39	Win	34–5	Maria Elena Villalobos	UD	10 (10)	2010-04-10	Ce.De.M. N° 2, Caseros, Argentina	Retained WBC super-bantamweight title
38	Win	33–5	Alicia Ashley	MD	10 (10)	2009-08-20	Estadio Luna Park, Buenos Aires, Argentina	Retained WBC super-bantamweight title
37	Win	32–5	Jackie Nava	UD	10 (10)	2009-04-30	Estadio Luna Park, Buenos Aires, Argentina	Retained WBC super-bantamweight title
36	Win	31–5	Alejandra Oliveras	UD	10 (10)	2008-12-04	Estadio Luna Park, Buenos Aires, Argentina	Retained WBA super-bantamweight title; Won WBC super-bantamweight title
35	Win	30–5	Paulina Cardona	RTD	5 (8)	2008-10-10	Ce.De.M. N° 2, Caseros, Argentina	
34	Win	29–5	Danielle Bouchard	UD	10 (10)	2008-07-03	Estadio Luna Park, Buenos Aires, Argentina	Retained WBA super-bantamweight title
33	Win	28–5	Anays Cecilia Gutierrez	RTD	3 (10)	2008-05-15	Sociedad Española, San Luis, Argentina	
32	Win	27–5	Adriana Salles	UD	8 (8)	2008-02-04	Hotel & Casino Conrad, Punta del Este, Uruguay	
31	Win	26–5	Claudia Andrea Lopez	UD	8 (8)	2007-10-27	Ce.De.M. N° 2, Caseros, Argentina	
30	Win	25–5	Maria del Carmen Potenza	TD	6 (10)	2007-06-29	Club Sportivo America, Rosario, Argentina	
29	Win	24–5	Yazmín Rivas	UD	10 (10)	2007-04-20	Andes Talleres Sport Club, Godoy Cruz, Argentina	Retained WBA super-bantamweight title
28	Win	23–5	Maria del Carmen Potenza	MD	10 (10)	2007-01-27	Hotel & Casino Conrad, Punta del Este, Uruguay	
27	Win	22–5	Maribel Santana	RTD	2 (10)	2006-12-15	Ce.De.M. N° 2, Caseros, Argentina	Retained WBA super-bantamweight title
26	Win	21–5	Paola Esther Herrera	TKO	1 (10)	2006-10-14	Estadio Luna Park, Buenos Aires, Argentina	Retained WBA super-bantamweight title
25	Win	20–5	Anays Cecilia Gutierrez	UD	10 (10)	2006-08-12	Ce.De.M. N° 2, Caseros, Argentina	Won inaugural WBA super-bantamweight title
24	Loss	19–5	Sharon Anyos	UD	10 (10)	2005-10-22	Gold Coast Convention and Exhibition Centre, Broadbeach, Australia	For inaugural WBC featherweight title
23	Win	19–4	Yolis Marrugo Franco	UD	8 (8)	2005-06-24	Club Gimnasia y Esgrima, Ituzaingó, Argentina	
22	Win	18–4	Nerys Rincon	RTD	2 (10)	2005-05-14	Ce.De.M. N° 2, Caseros, Argentina	Retained WIBA featherweight title
21	Win	17–4	Maria Andrea Miranda	TKO	3 (10)	2005-01-22	Estadio Cincuentenario, Formosa, Argentina	Won vacant WIBA featherweight title
20	Win	16–4	Miura Davila Ferreira	TKO	3 (4)	2004-09-11	Polideportivo Municipal Carlos Cerutti, Córdoba, Argentina	
19	Win	15–4	Monica Sabino Barbosa	TKO	4 (8)	2004-07-02	Club Caja Popular, San Miguel de Tucumán, Argentina	
18	Win	14–4	Daysi Padilla	TKO	1 (10)	2004-05-26	Estadio Luna Park, Buenos Aires, Argentina	Retained WIBA super-bantamweight title
17	Win	13–4	Damaris Pinock Ortega	TKO	6 (10)	2003-12-06	Estadio Luna Park, Buenos Aires, Argentina	Won vacant WIBA super-bantamweight title
16	Win	12–4	Maria del Carmen Montiel	UD	6 (6)	2003-08-22	Ciclista Juninense, Junín, Argentina	
15	Loss	11–4	Alicia Ashley	UD	10 (10)	2003-06-14	Estadio Republica de Venezuela, Bolívar, Argentina	For WIBF super-bantamweight title
14	Win	11–3	Miura Davila Ferreira	TKO	5 (6)	2003-05-10	Polideportivo Carlos Magalot, Río Grande, Argentina	
13	Win	10–3	Lourdes Noemi Gonzalez	TKO	2 (10)	2003-02-20	Estadio Republica de Venezuela, Bolívar, Argentina	Won vacant Argentine super-bantamweight title
12	Loss	9–3	Alicia Ashley	SD	10 (10)	2002-11-15	Orfeo Superdomo, Córdoba, Argentina	For vacant WIBF super-bantamweight title
11	Win	9–2	Maria del Carmen Montiel	UD	8 (8)	2002-06-29	Río Gallegos, Argentina	
10	Win	8–2	Maria del Carmen Montiel	UD	10 (10)	2002-03-01	Club Olimpia, Paraná, Argentina	Retained Argentine featherweight title
9	Win	7–2	Patricia Alejandra Quirico	KO	1 (10)	2002-01-19	Estadio F.A.B., Buenos Aires, Argentina	Won vacant Argentine featherweight title
8	Win	6–2	Ana Dos Santos	KO	2 (6)	2001-10-12	Estadio Cincuentenario, Formosa, Argentina	
7	Win	5–2	Andrea Venecia Pereira	KO	5 (6)	2001-09-21	Club Sportivo Ben Hur, Rafaela, Argentina	
6	Win	4–2	Yolis Marrugo Franco	UD	6 (6)	2001-08-11	Estadio Malvinas Argentinas, Mendoza, Argentina	
5	Win	3–2	Andrea Venecia Pereira	TKO	2 (4)	2001-06-30	Club Rivadavia, Necochea, Argentina	
4	Win	2–2	Luz Mariana Sarabia	UD	6 (6)	2001-06-02	Estadio Cincuentenario, Formosa, Argentina	
3	Win	1–2	Jamillia Lawrence	SD	4 (4)	2001-04-28	Estadio F.A.B., Buenos Aires, Argentina	
2	Loss	0–2	Lucia Rijker	KO	5 (10)	1998-09-25	Foxwoods Resort Casino, Ledyard, Connecticut, U.S.	For vacant IBO light-welterweight title
1	Loss	0–1	Christy Martin	UD	10 (10)	1997-12-05	Amphitheater, Pompano Beach, Florida, U.S.	

== Politics ==
In 2009 she was fourth on the Peronist list running for city council in Tres de Febrero Partido.

== See also ==
- List of female boxers

Sporting positions
Regional boxing titles
New title	Argentine female featherweight champion January 19, 2002 – December 6, 2003; Won WIBA title	Vacant Title next held by Betina Gabriela Garino
New title	Argentine female super-bantamweight champion February 20, 2003 – December 6, 2003; Won WIBA title	Vacant Title next held by Yésica Marcos
Vacant Title last held by Maria Elena Villalobos	WBC Silver female super-bantamweight champion May 19, 2012 – October 25, 2013; Won world title	Vacant Title next held by Yazmín Rivas
Vacant Title last held by Edith Soledad Matthysse	Argentine female featherweight champion September 24, 2022 – 2023; Vacated	Vacant Title next held by Daniela Romina Bermúdez
Minor World boxing titles
Vacant Title last held by Melissa Del Valle	WIBA female super-bantamweight champion December 6, 2003 – 2005; Vacated	Vacant Title next held by Lisa Brown
Vacant Title last held by Fujin Raika	WIBA female featherweight champion January 22, 2005 – 2005; Vacated	Vacant Title next held by Jeannine Garside
Major World boxing titles
Inaugural champion	WBA female super-bantamweight champion August 12, 2006 – 2010; Vacated	Vacant Title next held by Jeannine Garside
Preceded by Alejandra Oliveras	WBC female super-bantamweight champion December 4, 2008 – 2010; Vacated	Vacant Title next held by Lisa Brown
Inaugural champion	Undisputed female super-bantamweight champion December 4, 2008 – December 4, 2009; WBO title inaugurated	Vacant
Vacant Title last held by Yésica Marcos	WBO female super-bantamweight champion October 25, 2013 – 2016; Vacated	Vacant Title next held by Sabrina Maribel Pérez promoted from interim status
Vacant Title last held by Anahí Ester Sánchez	WBA female featherweight champion Interim title May 7, 2016 – December 16, 2016; Won world title	Vacant
Vacant Title last held by Yulihan Luna	IBF female super-bantamweight champion December 16, 2016 – April 13, 2018	Succeeded by Daniela Romina Bermúdez
Vacant Title last held by Daniela Romina Bermúdez	IBF female super-bantamweight champion August 10, 2018 – 2019; Vacated	Vacant Title next held by Daniela Romina Bermúdez
