= Alicia Ashley =

American boxer (born 1967)

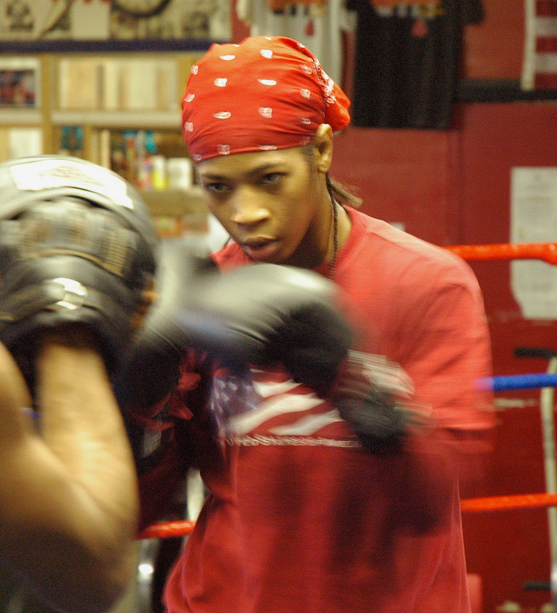
- Ashley in 2005

Personal information
- Nickname: Slick
- Nationality: American
- Born: August 23, 1967 (age 58) Kingston, Jamaica
- Height: 5 ft 4 1/2 in (164 cm)
- Weight: Super flyweight; Bantamweight; Super bantamweight; Featherweight; Super featherweight

Boxing career
- Stance: Southpaw

Boxing record
- Total fights: 37
- Wins: 24
- Win by KO: 4
- Losses: 12
- Draws: 1

Alicia Ashley (born August 23, 1967) is a Jamaican-American professional boxer who competed from 1999 to 2018. She held the World Boxing Council (WBC) female super bantamweight title twice between 2011 and 2016. Ashley was inducted into the International Boxing Hall of Fame in 2023.

== Personal life ==
Born in Jamaica, Ashley moved to the United States at a young age. She is the younger sister of chess grandmaster Maurice Ashley and former world kickboxing champion Devon Ashley.

== Career ==
Ashley began her professional boxing career on January 29, 1999, defeating Lisa Howarth by a six-round split decision in Atlantic City, New Jersey. On her second professional boxing fight, held in Halifax, Nova Scotia, Canada, she suffered her first defeat when she was outpointed over six rounds by Doris Hackl on June 20 of that year.

Ashley rebounded from that defeat with an eight-round decision win over Bonnie Canino June 27 at Tunica, Mississippi.

After her first three fights, she took a seven-month hiatus from boxing, but on February 11, 2000, she returned, losing by an eight-round decision to Mexico's Laura Serrano, also in Tunica. After splitting her two next fights, she met "Downtown Leona Brown": on June 29, she beat Brown on points over eight rounds in Philadelphia, Pennsylvania. Next, she fought Kelsey Jeffries, who, until that bout, had lost only one of her nine fights. On September 3, Ashley beat Jeffries by a six-round unanimous decision in Nevada.

Ashley had only one fight in 2001, a decision victory, and then, on January 13, 2002, she made her Las Vegas debut, drawing (tying) in six rounds with Layla McCarter.

Her next fight fought on February 23 of that year, was also her first world title try, when she and Jeffries were rematched with the vacant IWBF world Featherweight title on the line. Ashley became a world champion by defeating Jeffries, this time by a ten-round split decision, at New Jersey.

Ashley lost her next fight when she met the experienced Chevelle Hallback for Hallback's WIBA world Junior Lightweight title by a ten-round unanimous decision in Georgia on August 27.

Ashley then went down in weight, returning to the Super Bantamweight division. On November 15, she defeated Marcela Acuña by a ten-round split decision in Córdoba, Argentina, to win the WIBF's vacant world Super Bantamweight title. But this decision win was controversial (the fight was scored 96-94 by two judges for Ashley and 97-95 by the third for Acuña), and the WIBF ordered an immediate rematch between the two women fighters. On June 14, 2003, she and Acuña met again, this time at Buenos Aires. Ashley retained the title the second time around with a ten-round unanimous decision.

On November 15, she lost her title to Esther Schouten by a ten-round split decision in Austria.

Her next was against Shondell Alfred, on March 27, 2004, in Guyana. She defeated Alfred by an eight-round decision.

After a hiatus that lasted almost one year, Ashley returned to boxing on March 3, 2005. when she knocked out Elena Reid in seven rounds at Laughlin, she also fought in the World Combat League.

She lost the fight against Argentina's Marcela Eliana Acuna for the WBC female world super bantamweight title by a majority decision at the Estadio Luna Park in Buenos Aires on August 20, 2009.

After winning two fights in New York City, Ashley won the vacant WBC female super bantamweight title via a unanimous decision at the Hunts Point Produce Market in the Bronx on July 23, 2011. On 1 October 2016 at Dort Federal Event Center in Flint Michigan, she lost her title to Fatuma Zarika by split decision.

In 2023, Ashley was inducted into the International Boxing Hall of Fame.

== Professional boxing record ==
37 fights	24 wins	12 losses
By knockout	4	0
By decision	20	12
Draws	1	

No.	Result	Record	Opponent	Type	Round, time	Date	Location	Notes
37	Loss	24–12–1	Dina Thorslund	UD	10 (10)	Mar 10, 2018	Struer Arena, Struer, Denmark	For Interim WBC super-bantamweight title
36	Win	24–11–1	Liliana Martinez	PTS	8 (8)	Mar 31, 2017	Karibe Convention Center, Pétion-Ville, Haiti	
35	Loss	23–11–1	Fatuma Zarika	SD	10 (10)	Oct 1, 2016	Dort Financial Center, Flint, Michigan, U.S.	Lost WBC super-bantamweight title
34	Win	23–10–1	Christina McMahon	UD	10 (10)	Oct 29, 2015	Aviator Sports and Events Center, Brooklyn, New York, U.S.	Won vacant WBC super-bantamweight title
33	Win	22–10–1	Grecia Novas Mateo	TKO	7 (8)	Nov 8, 2014	Karibe Convention Center, Pétion-Ville, Haiti	
32	Loss	21–10–1	Jackie Nava	MD	10 (10)	Sep 6, 2014	Mexico City Arena, Mexico City, Mexico	Lost WBC super-bantamweight title
31	Win	21–9–1	Nohime Dennisson	TKO	6 (6)	May 21, 2014	Five Star Banquet, Queens, New York, U.S.	
30	Win	20–9–1	Zenny Sotomayor	TKO	5 (10)	Oct 23, 2013	Salon Las Pulgas, Tijuana, Mexico	Retained WBC super-bantamweight title
29	Win	19–9–1	Chantal Martínez	UD	10 (10)	Apr 20, 2013	Roberto Durán Arena, Panama City, Panama	Retained WBC super-bantamweight title
28	Win	18–9–1	Maria Elena Villalobos	UD	10 (10)	Mar 17, 2012	Deportivo del Sindicato del Metro, Mexico City, Mexico	Retained WBC super-bantamweight title
27	Win	17–9–1	Christina Ruiz	UD	10 (10)	Jul 23, 2011	Hunts Point Cooperative Market, The Bronx, New York, U.S.	For vacant WBC super-bantamweight title
26	Win	16–9–1	Crystal Hoy	UD	8 (8)	Jan 19, 2011	Masonic Temple, Brooklyn, New York, U.S.	
25	Win	15–9–1	Jackie Trivilino	UD	6 (6)	Apr 2, 2010	Masonic Temple, Brooklyn, New York, U.S.	
24	Loss	14–9–1	Marcela Acuña	MD	10 (10)	Aug 20, 2009	Estadio Luna Park, Buenos Aires, Argentina	For WBC super-bantamweight title
23	Loss	14–8–1	Lisa Brown	SD	10 (10)	Jun 12, 2008	Mohegan Sun Arena, Uncasville, Connecticut, U.S.	For IFBA super-bantamweight title
22	Win	14–7–1	Brooke Dierdorff	UD	8 (8)	Jan 31, 2008	Paradise Theater, The Bronx, New York, U.S.	For vacant NABF super-bantamweight title
21	Win	13–7–1	Delia Hoppe	UD	6 (6)	Apr 11, 2007	Paradise Theater, The Bronx, New York, U.S.	
20	Loss	12–7–1	Zhang Xiyan	UD	10 (10)	Apr 15, 2006	Chengdu, China	For vacant WIBA bantamweight title
19	Loss	12–6–1	Ryu Myung-ok	UD	10 (10)	Oct 21, 2005	Jungjuyoung Gymnasium, Pyongyang, North Korea	For WBC super-flyweight title
18	Win	12–5–1	Alesia Graf	SD	10 (10)	May 28, 2005	Hanns-Martin-Schleyer-Halle, Stuttgart, Germany	
17	Win	11–5–1	Elena Reid	TKO	7 (8)	Mar 26, 2005	Harrah's Laughlin, Laughlin, Nevada, U.S.	
16	Win	10–5–1	Shondell Alfred	UD	8 (8)	Mar 27, 2004	Cliff Anderson Sports Hall, Georgetown, Guyana	
15	Loss	9–5–1	Esther Schouten	SD	10 (10)	Nov 15, 2003	Trend Eventhotel Pyramid, Vienna, Austria	Lost WIBF super-bantamweight title
14	Win	9–4–1	Marcela Acuña	UD	10 (10)	Jun 14, 2003	Estadio Republica de Venezuela, Bolívar, Argentina	Retained WIBF super-bantamweight title
13	Win	8–4–1	Marcela Acuña	SD	10 (10)	Nov 15, 2002	Orfeo Superdomo, Córdoba, Argentina	Won vacant WIBF super-bantamweight title
12	Loss	7–4–1	Chevelle Hallback	UD	10 (10)	Aug 27, 2002	Civic Center, Savannah, Georgia, U.S.	For vacant IBA super-featherweight title
11	Win	7–3–1	Kelsey Jeffries	SD	10 (10)	Feb 23, 2002	Ballys Park Place, Atlantic City, New Jersey, U.S.	Won vacant IWBF featherweight title
10	Draw	6–3–1	Layla McCarter	MD	6 (6)	Jan 13, 2002	Venetian Hotel & Casino, Paradise, Nevada, U.S.	
9	Win	6–3	Claudette Alexander	UD	4 (4)	Feb 17, 2001	Saint Thomas, U.S. Virgin Islands	
8	Win	5–3	Kelsey Jeffries	UD	6 (6)	Sep 3, 2000	Casino West, Yerington, Nevada, U.S.	
7	Win	4–3	Leona Brown	SD	8 (8)	Jun 29, 2000	Viking Hall, Philadelphia, Pennsylvania, U.S.	
6	Loss	3–3	Songul Oruc	SD	4 (4)	May 13, 2000	Conseco Fieldhouse, Indianapolis, Indiana, U.S.	
5	Win	3–2	Heather McVey	UD	4 (4)	Apr 1, 2000	Harrah's Laughlin, Laughlin, Nevada, U.S.	
4	Loss	2–2	Laura Serrano	UD	8 (8)	Feb 11, 2000	Gold Strike, Tunica Resorts, Mississippi, U.S.	
3	Win	2–1	Bonnie Canino	UD	8 (8)	May 27, 1999	Gold Strike, Tunica Resorts, Mississippi, U.S.	
2	Loss	1–1	Doris Hackl	SD	6 (6)	May 20, 1999	Halifax Metro Centre, Halifax, Canada	
1	Win	1–0	Lisa Howarth	SD	6 (6)	Jan 29, 1999	Tropicana Hotel & Casino, Atlantic City, New Jersey, U.S.	

== See also ==
- List of female boxers
- List of southpaw stance boxers

Sporting positions
Regional boxing titles
Vacant Title last held by Kelsey Jeffries	NABF super-bantamweight champion January 31, 2008 – July 23, 2011; Won world title	Vacant Title next held by Magali Rodriguez
Minor world boxing titles
Vacant Title last held by Iwona Guzowska	IWBF featherweight champion February 23, 2002 – 2015; Vacated	Vacant Title next held by Melissa Fiorentino
Vacant Title last held by Esther Schouten	WIBF super-bantamweight champion November 15, 2002 – November 15, 2003	Succeeded by Esther Schouten
Major world boxing titles
Vacant Title last held by Marcela Acuña	WBC super-bantamweight champion July 23, 2011 – September 6, 2014	Succeeded by Jackie Nava
Vacant Title last held by Jackie Nava	WBC super-bantamweight champion October 29, 2015 – October 1, 2016	Succeeded by Fatuma Zarika
