= Ryu Myung-ok =

North Korean boxer

Personal information
- Born: 10 November 1983 (age 42) North Korea
- Height: 5 ft 2 in (157 cm)
- Weight: Super flyweight

Boxing career

Boxing record
- Total fights: 6
- Wins: 5
- Win by KO: 3
- Draws: 1

Ryu Myung-ok (Korean: 류명옥; born 10 November 1983), is a North Korean former professional boxer. She held the WBC super-flyweight title twice between 2005 and 2009. She is just one of 20 female boxing champions to retire without a loss.

== Professional career ==
Ryu turned professional in 2004 & compiled a record of 2–0 before facing & defeating Elizabeth Sanchez to win the inaugural WBC super-flyweight title. After losing the title due to inactivity, she would become a two-time world champion when she beat Mexican Ana María Torres for the same title. She would lose the title again due to inactivity, and has not fought since.

== Professional boxing record ==
6 fights	5 wins	0 losses
By knockout	3	0
By decision	2	0
Draws	1	

No.	Result	Record	Opponent	Type	Round, time	Date	Location	Notes
6	Draw	5–0–1	Ana María Torres	MD	10	2008-04-26	Plaza de Toros Juriquilla, Querétaro, Querétaro, Mexico	Retained WBC super-flyweight title
5	Win	5–0	Ana María Torres	SD	10	2007-10-19	Kaesong, North Korea	Won WBC super-flyweight title
4	Win	4–0	Alicia Ashley	UD	10	2005-10-21	Jungjuyoung Gymnasium, Pyongyang, North Korea	Retained WBC super-flyweight title
3	Win	3–0	Elizabeth Sanchez	KO	2 (10), 0:50	2005-06-28	Pyongyang, North Korea	Won inaugural WBC super-flyweight title
2	Win	2–0	Mariana Juárez	TKO	10 (10)	2005-03-30	Hotel Sunrise International, Shenyang, Liaoning, China	Won IFBA super-flyweight title
1	Win	1–0	Tomoko Koga	KO	6 (?)	2004-10-29	Shenyang, Liaoning, China	

== See also ==
- List of female boxers
- List of Korean boxers

Sporting positions
Minor world boxing titles
Preceded by Mariana Juárez	IFBA super-flyweight champion March 30, 2005 – 2005; Vacated	Vacant Title next held by Ji Young Kim
Major world boxing titles
Inaugural champion	WBC super-flyweight champion June 28, 2005 – 2006; Stripped	Vacant Title next held by Ana María Torres
Preceded by Ana María Torres	WBC super-flyweight champion October 19, 2007 – February, 2009; Stripped	Succeeded by Ana María Torres promoted from interim status
