= Heather Hardy =

American boxer (born 1982)

- Born: January 25, 1982 (age 44); Brooklyn, New York, U.S.
- Other names: The Heat
- Height: 5 ft 5 in (165 cm)
- Weight: 122 lb (55 kg; 8.7 st)
- Division: Flyweight (MMA); Super bantamweight (Boxing); Featherweight (Boxing)
- Reach: 64 in (163 cm)
- Style: Boxing, Kickboxing
- Stance: Orthodox
- Team: Renzo Gracie Academy (2017–2019); Serra-Longo Fight Team (2019)
- Years active: 2017–2019 (MMA); 2010–2024 (Boxing)

Professional boxing record
- Total: 28
- Wins: 24
- By knockout: 4
- Losses: 3
- By knockout: 0
- Draws: 0
- No contests: 1

Mixed martial arts record
- Total: 4
- Wins: 2
- By knockout: 1
- By decision: 1
- Losses: 2
- By knockout: 2

Other information
- Boxing record from BoxRec
- Mixed martial arts record from Sherdog

Heather Hardy (born January 25, 1982) is an American former professional boxer and mixed martial artist. In boxing, she held the WBO female featherweight title from 2018 to 2019. Hardy is a member of the International Women's Boxing Hall of Fame.

== Early life and family ==
Hardy was born on January 25, 1982, to John and Linda Hardy and is of Irish descent. She has two younger siblings, Kaitlyn and Colin. Hardy had married her high school sweetheart in 2004, but the pair divorced in 2010. Hardy was raised in Gerritsen Beach in South Brooklyn.

While in school, Hardy was active in athletics, aspiring to become the first female pitcher for the New York Yankees. Hardy went on to major in Forensic Psychology at John Jay College of Criminal Justice in Manhattan. She graduated at the age of 22.

== Boxing career ==
Hardy started boxing in 2010 and had her first amateur bout in April 2011, aged 29, going on to win the USA Boxing national female featherweight title two months later.

She made her professional debut on 2 August 2012, defeating Mikayla Nebel over four rounds by unanimous decision at Roseland Ballroom in New York.

In her seventh pro-fight, Hardy won the Universal Boxing Federation female super-bantamweight title, stopping Ana Laura Gomez in the second round of their contest at the Aviator Sports and Events Center in New York on 9 November 2013.

Unbeaten in her first 10 paid fights, she claimed the vacant WBC female super-bantamweight International title on 15 October 2014, thanks to a majority decision success over Crystal Hoy at BB Kings Blues Club & Grill in New York. Two of the ringside judges awarded the fight to Hardy by 100–90 and 99–91 respectively, while the third saw it as a 95–95 tie.

On 21 August 2016 at Ford Amphitheater in Coney Island, New York, she faced Shelly Vincent for the vacant WBC female featherweight International title in the first women's boxing bout televised on NBCSN. Hardy won via majority decision with two of the judges' scorecards reading 99–91 and 97–93 respectively in her favour, overruling the third who saw the contest as a 95–95 draw.

Hardy met Vincent in a rematch at Madison Square Garden Theater in New York on 27 October 2018, with the vacant WBO female featherweight title on the line. She again won the bout, this time by unanimous decision.

Returning to Madison Square Garden Theater, she lost her title, and undefeated record, in her first defense, Go my down a unanimous decision defeat against Amanda Serrano on 13 September 2019. The following month she was given a six month suspension and fined $10,000 for failing an anti-doping test after the banned substance furosemide was found in a urine sample she provided the day before her fight with Serrano. Hardy blamed the test result on a prescription medication she was taking for "period symptoms."

After almost two years away from the competitive boxing ring, Hardy returned on 14 May 2021, losing to Jessica Camara via unanimous decision at the Embassy Suites Nashville SE in Murfreesboro, Tennessee.

Another lengthy lay-off followed, before her next outing which saw her get back to winning ways with a unanimous decision success over Calista Silgado in a six-round bout at Sony Hall in New York on 13 October 2022.

Hardy then secured a majority decision win against Taynna Cardoso over eight rounds at the same venue on 23 February 2023.

On 5 August 2023, Hardy faced Amanda Serrano, who by now was undisputed female featherweight world champion, in the co-main event of Jake Paul vs. Nate Diaz at the American Airlines Center in Dallas, Texas. Just had been the case four years earlier, she lost via unanimous decision.

In October 2025, she was named among the inductees for the 2026 International Women's Boxing Hall of Fame class.

== Mixed martial arts career ==
=== Invicta Fighting Championship ===
Hardy was scheduled to make her professional MMA debut against Brieta Carpenter at Invicta FC 21. However, the bout was cancelled due to an injury by Carpenter.

=== Bellator MMA ===
Hardy made her professional MMA debut at Bellator 180 in a flyweight bout against Alice Yauger on June 24, 2017, at the Madison Square Garden. She won the fight via TKO in the third round.

Hardy faced Kristina Williams in a flyweight contest at Bellator 185. She lost the bout via TKO due to a doctor stoppage in the second round after a head kick from Williams shattered her nose.

Hardy faced Ana Julaton on February 16, 2018, at Bellator 194. She won the fight via unanimous decision.

Hardy faced Taylor Turner at Bellator 222 on June 14, 2019. She lost the fight via first round TKO.

On July 10, 2021, it was announced that she was no longer under contract with Bellator.

== Bare-knuckle boxing ==
=== Bare Knuckle Fighting Championship ===
Hardy was scheduled to make her debut against BKFC Women's Flyweight Champion Christine Ferea in a bantamweight bout at BKFC 61's main event on May 11, 2024. However, due to an injury, the bout was scrapped.

Via an Instagram post in May 2024, Hardy revealed that she pulled out of the scheduled bout because she had "too much brain damage" implying that her career was likely over.

== Retirement and lawsuit ==
Hardy announced her retirement from all combat sports in May 2024, stating she was doing so on the advice of doctors' due to issues relating to concussions and potential brain damage.

In September 2025, Hardy filed lawsuits against two of her former promotors, Boxing Insider and DiBella Entertainment, as well as Lou DiBella, sports equipment manufacturer Everlast Worldwide and its parent company Frasers Group, the New York State Athletic Commission and its medical director Dr Nitin Sethi along with unnamed "John Doe" defendants. The case centered on allegations of liability for Hardy's physical condition, which the lawsuit said included symptoms of Chronic Traumatic Encephalopathy, and alleged violations of federal and state equal pay laws.

In July 2026, Hardy started a GoFundMe page with a $100,000 target, stating that "damage" she had suffered during her career had affected her "ability to work consistently enough to cover basic living expenses and necessities."

== In the media ==
In 2013, she was the subject of the film "Hardy" focussing on the gender wage gap in boxing.

In 2016, Hardy partnered with Dove on their #MyBeautyMySay campaign.

== Professional boxing record ==
28 fights	24 wins	3 losses
By knockout	4	0
By decision	20	3
No contests	1	

No.	Result	Record	Opponent	Type	Round, time	Date	Location	Notes
28	Loss	24–3 (1)	Amanda Serrano	UD	10	Aug 5, 2023	American Airlines Center, Dallas, Texas, U.S.	For WBA, WBC, IBF, WBO, IBO, and The Ring featherweight titles
27	Win	24–2 (1)	Taynna Cardoso	MD	6	Feb 23, 2023	Sony Hall, New York City, New York, U.S.	
26	Win	23–2 (1)	Calista Silgado	UD	6	Oct 13, 2022	Sony Hall, New York City, New York, U.S.	
25	Loss	22–2 (1)	Jessica Camara	UD	8	May 14, 2021	Embassy Suites Nashville SE, Murfreesboro, Tennessee, U.S.	
24	Loss	22–1 (1)	Amanda Serrano	UD	10	Sep 13, 2019	Hulu Theater, New York City, New York, U.S.	Lost WBO featherweight title; For vacant WBC interim featherweight title
23	Win	22–0 (1)	Shelly Vincent	UD	10	Oct 27, 2018	Hulu Theater, New York City, New York, U.S.	Won vacant WBO featherweight title
22	Win	21–0 (1)	Iranda Paola Torres	UD	8	Apr 21, 2018	Barclays Center, Brooklyn, New York, U.S.	
21	Win	20–0 (1)	Edina Kiss	UD	8	May 18, 2017	Paramount Theater, Brooklyn, New York, U.S.	Retained WBC International featherweight title
20	Win	19–0 (1)	Edina Kiss	UD	8	Mar 4, 2017	Barclays Center, Brooklyn, New York, U.S.	Retained WBC International featherweight title
19	Win	18–0 (1)	Shelly Vincent	MD	10	Aug 21, 2016	Ford Amphitheater, Brooklyn, New York, U.S.	Won vacant WBC International featherweight title
18	Win	17–0 (1)	Kirstie Simmons	UD	8	Jun 25, 2016	Barclays Center, Brooklyn, New York, U.S.	
17	Win	16–0 (1)	Anna Donatella Hultin	TKO	4 (8) 0:48	Apr 16, 2016	Barclays Center, Brooklyn, New York, U.S.	
16	Win	15–0 (1)	Noemi Bosques	UD	8	Dec 5, 2015	Barclays Center, Brooklyn, New York, U.S.	
15	Win	14–0 (1)	Renáta Dömsödi	RTD	6 (10), 2:00	Aug 1, 2015	Barclays Center, Brooklyn, New York, U.S.	Retained WBC International super-bantamweight title
14	Win	13–0 (1)	Noemi Bosques	SD	8	May 29, 2015	Barclays Center, Brooklyn, New York, U.S.	
13	NC	12–0 (1)	Renáta Dömsödi	NC	3 (8), 1:57	Apr 11, 2015	Barclays Center, Brooklyn, New York, U.S.	Retained WBC International super-bantamweight title
12	Win	12–0	Elizabeth Anderson	UD	10	Dec 3, 2014	BB Kings Blues Club & Grill, New York City, New York, U.S.	
11	Win	11–0	Crystal Hoy	MD	10	Oct 15, 2014	BB Kings Blues Club & Grill, New York City, New York, U.S.	Won vacant WBC International super-bantamweight title
10	Win	10–0	Jackie Trivilino	TD	7 (8)	Jun 14, 2014	Barclays Center, Brooklyn, New York, U.S.	
9	Win	9–0	Nydia Feliciano	UD	8	Mar 21, 2014	Aviator Sports and Events Center, New York City, New York, U.S.	
8	Win	8–0	Christina Fuentes	SD	8	Feb 12, 2014	Roseland Ballroom, New York City, New York, U.S.	
7	Win	7–0	Ana Laura Gomez	TKO	2 (10) 1:44	Nov 9, 2013	Aviator Sports and Events Center, New York City, New York, U.S.	
6	Win	6–0	Cassie Trost	TKO	4 (6) 1:30	Jul 24, 2013	Roseland Ballroom, New York City, New York, U.S.	
5	Win	5–0	Mikayla Nebel	UD	6	Apr 4, 2013	Roseland Ballroom, New York City, New York, U.S.	
4	Win	4–0	Peggy Maerz	UD	4	Jan 23, 2013	BB Kings Blues Club & Grill, New York City, New York, U.S.	
3	Win	3–0	Ivana Coleman	UD	4	Dec 8, 2012	Resorts World Casino, New York City, New York, U.S.	
2	Win	2–0	Unique Harris	UD	4	Oct 24, 2012	Roseland Ballroom, New York City, New York, U.S.	
1	Win	1–0	Mikayla Nebel	UD	4	Aug 2, 2012	Roseland Ballroom, New York City, New York, U.S.	

== Mixed martial arts record ==
Professional record breakdown
4 matches	2 wins	2 losses
By knockout	1	2
By decision	1	0

Res.	Record	Opponent	Method	Event	Date	Round	Time	Location	Notes
Loss	2–2	Taylor Turner	TKO (punches)	Bellator 222	June 14, 2019	1	3:53	New York City, New York, United States	Catchweight (128 lbs) bout.
Win	2–1	Ana Julaton	Decision (unanimous)	Bellator 194	February 16, 2018	3	5:00	Uncasville, Connecticut, United States	
Loss	1–1	Kristina Williams	TKO (doctor stoppage)	Bellator 185	October 20, 2017	2	2:00	Uncasville, Connecticut, United States	
Win	1–0	Alice Yauger	TKO (punches)	Bellator 180	June 24, 2017	3	4:47	New York City, New York, United States	

== See also ==
- List of female boxers
- List of female mixed martial artists

Sporting positions
Regional boxing titles
Vacant Title last held by Dominga Olivo	WBC International super-bantamweight champion October 15, 2014 – 2016; Vacated	Vacant Title next held by Yazmín Rivas
Vacant Title last held by Gaelle Amand	WBC International featherweight champion August 21, 2016 – 2018; Vacated	Vacant Title next held by Sandra Atanassow
World boxing titles
Vacant Title last held by Cindy Serrano	WBO featherweight champion October 27, 2018 – September 13, 2019	Succeeded by Amanda Serrano
