= Samantha Worthington =

American boxer (born 1995)

Personal information
- Nickname: The Heat
- Born: Samantha Maria Kinchen; November 8, 1995 (age 30) Alabama, U.S.
- Height: 5 ft 7 in (170 cm)
- Weight: Light welterweight

Boxing career
- Reach: 68 1/2 in (174 cm)
- Stance: Orthodox

Boxing record
- Total fights: 13
- Wins: 12
- Win by KO: 7
- Losses: 1
Medal record
Women's Amateur boxing
Representing United States
IBA Youth World Boxing Championships
Bronze medal – third place	2013 Albena	Welterweight

Samantha Worthington (née Kinchen) (born November 8, 1995) is an American professional boxer. She held the WBA interim female super-lightweight title from July 2025 until February 2026.

== Career ==
As an amateur, she won a bronze medal in the welterweight category at the 2013 Youth and Junior World Boxing Championships in Bulgaria as well as five national titles.

Worthington turned professional in 2019, and won her debut paid fight with a first round knockout.

In her eighth pro-fight, she won the Universal Boxing Organization female super-lightweight title by defeating Yazmín Rivas on a unanimous decision at the Muhammad Ali Center in Louisville, Kentucky, on 20 January 2024.

In June 2024, Worthington became the first boxer to sign for five-weight world champion Claressa Shields' T-Rex Promotions.

Unbeaten in 11 professional contests, she faced Victoire Piteau for the vacant WBA interim female super-lightweight title at Little Caesars Arena in Detroit, Michigan, on 26 July 2025, as part of the undercard for the Claressa Shields vs Lani Daniels undisputed female heavyweight championship fight. Worthington won via majority decision with two judges awarding her the bout by scores of 99–91 and 96–94 and the third seeing it as a 95–95 draw.

Back at the same venue for her first defense on 22 February 2026, Worthington lost the title to Edith Soledad Matthysse when she retired on her stool at the end of the eighth round.

== Professional boxing record ==
13 fights	12 wins	1 loss
By knockout	7	1
By decision	5	0

No.	Result	Record	Opponent	Type	Round, time	Date	Location	Notes
13	Loss	12–1	Edith Soledad Matthysse	RTD	8 (10), 2:00	Feb 22, 2026	Little Caesars Arena, Detroit, Michigan, U.S.	Lost Interim WBA female light-welterweight title
12	Win	12–0	Victoire Piteau	MD	10	Jul 26, 2025	Little Caesars Arena, Detroit, Michigan, U.S.	Won Interim WBA female light-welterweight title
11	Win	11–0	Vaida Masiokaite	UD	8	Feb 2, 2025	Dort Financial Center, Flint, Michigan, U.S.	
10	Win	10–0	Jaica Green	UD	6	Dec 12, 2024	Dort Financial Center, Flint, Michigan, U.S.	
9	Win	9–0	Edina Kiss	RTD	2 (8), 2:00	Jul 27, 2024	Little Caesars Arena, Detroit, Michigan, U.S.	
8	Win	8–0	Yazmín Rivas	UD	10	Jan 20, 2024	Muhammad Ali Center, Louisville, Kentucky, U.S.	Won vacant UBO light-welterweight title
7	Win	7–0	Angi Romero	TKO	1 (8), 1:04	Dec 12, 2023	Club La Pradera, Carmen de Apicalá, Colombia	
6	Win	6–0	Karen Lopez	TKO	2 (8), 1:04	Dec 3, 2023	Club La Pradera, Carmen de Apicalá, Colombia	
5	Win	5–0	Carolina Mejia	TKO	3 (6), 0:35	Nov 17, 2023	Gimnasio Extreme Limits, Sogamoso, Colombia	
4	Win	4–0	Yeimi Benitez	KO	1 (6), 1:20	Oct 21, 2023	Club Anibal Gonzalez, Cartagena, Colombia	
3	Win	3–0	Roshetta Vatuvei	UD	4	Jan 13, 2023	Embassy Suites Nashville SE, Murfreesboro, Tennessee, U.S.	
2	Win	2–0	Camille Embry	TKO	1 (4)	Aug 20, 2022	Oak Grove Racing and Gaming Hotel, Oak Grove, Kentucky, U.S.	
1	Win	1–0	Karina Mendoza	KO	1 (4), 1:58	Nov 2, 2019	Bourbon Hall, Louisville, Kentucky, U.S.	

== See also ==
- List of female boxers

Sporting positions
Minor world boxing titles
Vacant Title last held by Czarina McCoy	UBO light-welterweight champion January 20, 2024 – 2025; Vacated	Vacant
Major world boxing titles
Vacant Title last held by Anahí Ester Sánchez	WBA light-welterweight champion Interim title July 26, 2025 – February 22, 2026	Succeeded by Edith Soledad Matthysse
