= Shondell Alfred =

Guyanese boxer (born 1982)

Personal information
- Nickname: Mystery Lady
- Nationality: Guyana
- Born: July 7, 1982 (age 44) Guyana
- Height: 5 ft 4 in (163 cm)
- Weight: Bantamweight

Boxing career
- Stance: Orthodox

Boxing record
- Total fights: 18
- Wins: 13
- Win by KO: 4
- Losses: 5

Shondell Alfred (born 7 July 1982) is a Guyanese former professional boxer who competed between 1999 and 2010. She held the WIBA bantamweight title from 2009 to 2010.

== Professional career ==
Alfred made her professional boxing debut on 19 February 1999, beating Stephanie George by a four-round decision at Georgetown. After two more four-round decision wins, she went to Canada, where she would have her next two bouts: On 9 June 2000, she was stopped by Doris Hackl in the fourth round of a bout between undefeated fighters that was held in Halifax, and, on 23 September she suffered her second knockout loss in a row, defeated by Lisa Brown in two rounds at the Ontario location of Rama.

After losing to Brown, she returned home, where she defeated Joenette Toby on 6 August 2001, also by a four-round decision. On 26 December of that year, she registered her first knockout win, defeating Adriana Francis in the first round.

Alfred then left boxing for a year and a half. When she returned, she flew to Barbados, where she scored her second first-round knockout in a row, beating Vicki Boodram. Back home, a rematch with George awaited. The two fighters were now experienced and well known, and the rematch was eagerly awaited for by Guyanese boxing fans. On 26 December exactly two years to the date that Alfred scored her first knockout win, she outpointed George for the second time, this time over eight rounds.

Her next fight took Alfred to Europe. In that continent, she boxed Alexandra Mattheus on 28 February 2004. Alfred lost by a four-round decision. The fight was held in Denmark.

Her next fight, against the well known Alicia Ashley, was held in Guyana, on 27 March. Alfred was knocked down in round three, and, although she recuperated and lasted the eight round distance, she lost by an eight-round decision.

Immediately after the fight with Ashley, Alfred was given her first chance at winning a championship. On 22 November, she boxed Boodran in a rematch, for the WIBA Iberian-American Bantamweight title. The fight was held in Trinidad and Tobago. Alfred once again beat Boodram by knockout, this time in the third round.

She went on to defeated Marisol Miranda on points but lost to Danielle Bouchard, by unanimous decision in a fight at Bell Centre, Canada on 16 May 2006.

On 26 September 2009, Alfred took on Corinne De Groot for the Women's International Boxing Association bantamweight title. The fight took place at the Cliff Anderson Sports Hall and Alfred won by a unanimous decision. She defended her title by a TKO in round four in the rematch held at the Princess Ramada Hotel the following year.

Alfred had her last bout on 6 November 2010 defeating Olga Lula over six rounds. In 2012, Alfred was scheduled to fight Mexico's Zulina Muñoz for the WBA super flyweight title but the fight was cancelled when Alfred tested positive as pregnant. Alfred subsequently retired.

== Honors ==
A former Sportswoman-of-the-Year (2010), she was the recipient of a house lot in 2011 by then president Bharrat Jagdeo and was the WBC Women's Inspirational Boxer of the Year in 2011. The Guyana Boxing Board of Control named Alfred Fighter-of-the-Year in 2011.

== Personal life ==
Alfred was born in Albouystown, Guyana. Growing up she attended St. Stephen's Primary and later St. Joseph's High School and although she did not participate in boxing, growing up, she did take part in athletics and karate. Alfred's father, Cecil Alfred, represented Guyana at the 1976 Central and American Caribbean boxing championships held in Jamaica.

== Professional boxing record ==
18 fights	13 wins	5 losses
By knockout	4	2
By decision	9	3

No.	Result	Record	Opponent	Type	Round, time	Date	Location	Notes
18	Win	14–4	(Colombia) Olga Julio	PTS	6	6 Nov 2010	Princess Hotel and Casino, Georgetown, Guyana	
17	Win	13–4	(Canada) Corinne Van Ryck DeGroot	TKO	4 (10)	5 Jun 2010	Princess Hotel and Casino, Georgetown, Guyana	Retained WIBA bantamweight title
16	Win	12–4	(Canada) Corinne Van Ryck DeGroot	UD	10	26 Sep 2009	Cliff Anderson Sports Hall, Georgetown, Guyana	Won vacant WIBA bantamweight title
15	Win	11–4	(Guyana) Stephaney George	UD	8	25 Apr 2009	Cliff Anderson Sports Hall, Georgetown, Guyana	
14	Loss	10–4	(Canada) Danielle Bouchard	UD	4	16 May 2006	Bell Centre, Montreal, Canada	
13	Win	10–3	(United States) Marisol Miranda	PTS	6	9 Jul 2005	Georgetown, Guyana	
12	Win	9–3	(Trinidad and Tobago) Vicki Boodram	TKO	3 (8)	22 Oct 2004	Town Promenade, Princes Town, Trinidad and Tobago	
11	Loss	8–3	(Jamaica) Alicia Ashley	UD	8	27 Mar 2004	Cliff Anderson Sports Hall, Georgetown, Guyana	
10	Loss	7–3	(Denmark) Alexandra Matheus	UD	4	28 Feb 2004	Europahallen, Aalborg, Denmark	
9	Win	7–2	(Guyana) Stephaney George	MD	8	26 Dec 2003	Cliff Anderson Sports Hall, Georgetown, Guyana	
8	Win	6–2	(Trinidad and Tobago) Vicki Boodram	TKO	1 (4)	29 Aug 2003	Garfield Sobers Sports Complex, Wildey, Barbados	
7	Win	5–2	(Trinidad and Tobago) Adanna Francis	TKO	1	26 Dec 2001	(United Kingdom) Cliff Anderson Sports Hall, Georgetown, Guyana	
6	Win	4–2	(Guyana) Joenette Toby	PTS	4	5 Aug 2001	Georgetown, Guyana	
5	Loss	3–2	(Trinidad and Tobago) Lisa Brown	TKO	2 (4)	23 Sep 2000	Casino Rama, Rama, Canada	
4	Loss	3–1	(Canada) Doris Hackl	TKO	4 (6)	9 Jun 2000	Casino Nova Scotia, Halifax, Canada	
3	Win	3–0	(Guyana) Shondell Thomas	PTS	4	1 Aug 1999	Georgetown, Guyana	
2	Win	2–0	(Guyana) Sharon Johnson	PTS	4	21 Apr 1999	Georgetown, Guyana	
1	Win	1–0	(Guyana) Stephaney George	PTS	4	19 Feb 1999	Georgetown, Guyana	

== See also ==
- List of female boxers
