= Victoire Piteau =

French boxer (born 1999)

Personal information
- Nationality: (France) French
- Born: 19 April 1999 (age 27)
- Height: 171 cm (5 ft 7 in)
- Weight: Super-lightweight

Boxing career
- Stance: Southpaw

Boxing record
- Wins: 14
- Win by KO: 2
- Losses: 3

Victoire Piteau (born 19 April 1999) is a French professional boxer. She is a former European female super-lightweight champion having won the vacant title by defeating Ioana Fecioru via unanimous decision at Salle Omnisports in Saint-Maur 36, France, on 30 November 2024. Piteau faced Samantha Worthington for the vacant WBA interim female super-lightweight title at Little Caesars Arena in Detroit, Michigan, USA, on 26 July 2025, as part of the undercard for the Claressa Shields vs Lani Daniels undisputed female heavyweight championship fight. She lost via majority decision with two judges awarding Worthington the bout by scores of 99–91 and 96–94 and the third seeing it as a 95–95 draw.
