= Edith Soledad Matthysse =

Argentine boxer (born 1980)

Personal information
- Born: 6 August 1980 (age 45) Rafaela, Santa Fe, Argentina
- Height: 166 cm (5 ft 5 in)
- Weight: Bantamweight; Super-bantamweight; Featherweight; Super-featherweight; Super-lightweight

Boxing career
- Stance: Orthodox

Boxing record
- Total fights: 38
- Wins: 21
- Win by KO: 4
- Losses: 16
- Draws: 1

Edith Soledad Matthysse (born 6 August 1980) is an Argentine professional boxer who is a former unified featherweight world champion, having held the WBA female title from 2013 to 2016 and the WBC female title from 2015 to 2016. She is the older sister of former welterweight world champion of boxing, Lucas Matthysse.

== Professional career ==
Matthysse made her professional debut on 18 May 2007, scoring a four-round unanimous decision (UD) victory against Graciela Adriana Becerra at the Estadio Socios Fundadores in Comodoro Rivadavia, Argentina.

After compiling a record of 9–3–1 (1 KO), she challenged Yazmín Rivas for the IBF female bantamweight title on 4 February 2012, at the Gimnasio de las Liebres in Río Bravo, Mexico. Matthysse failed in her first attempt at a world title, losing via UD over ten rounds.

Following a UD victory against Antonia Ayala Vazquez in March, Matthysse faced former two-weight world champion Marcela Acuña on 10 May 2013, at the Auditorio Presidente Néstor Kirchner in Tapiales, Argentina, with the vacant IBF Inter-Continental female super bantamweight title on the line. Matthysse suffered the fifth defeat of her career, losing via ten-round UD with all three judges scoring the bout 99–91.

She bounced back from defeat with a UD victory against Anahi Yolanda Salles in August, before suffering another defeat, losing via ten-round UD against WBC Silver female featherweight champion Betiana Patricia Viñas on 27 September, at the Polideportivo La Colonia in Junín, Argentina.

In her next fight she challenged WBA female featherweight champion Ogleidis Suárez on 13 December 2013, at the Teatro Griego Juan Pablo Segundo in San Martín, Argentina. Matthysse defeated Suarez via UD to capture her first world title, with the judges' scorecards reading 100–90, 99–91 and 97–93.

She moved down a weight class in her next fight for a rematch with newly crowned WBO female super bantamweight champion Marcela Acuña. The bout took place on 23 August 2014 at the Sociedad Alemana de Gimnasia de Villa Ballester in Jose Leon Suarez, Argentina. Matthysse suffered her second defeat at the hands of Acuña, losing via ten-round UD with the judges' scorecards reading 98–92, 97–93 and 96–94.

After a UD victory against Lizbeth Crespo in a non-title fight in May 2015, Matthysse put her WBA title on the line in a unification fight against WBC female featherweight champion Jelena Mrdjenovich on 1 August in Caseros, Argentina. After the ten rounds were complete, Matthysse emerged victorious via UD to become the new unified featherweight champion, with the judges' scorecards reading 98–92, 97–93 and 96–94. The pair would have a rematch on 11 March 2016, at the Shaw Conference Centre in Edmonton, Canada, with Mrdjenovich gaining her revenge, dropping Matthysse to the canvas in the tenth and final round en route to a UD victory. Two judges scored the bout 96–93 and the third judge scored it 97–82 to hand Matthysse the eighth defeat of her career.

Following a UD loss against Natalia Vanesa del Valle Aguirre in June 2017, Matthysse suffered her third consecutive defeat, losing via UD against South American female super bantamweight champion Laura Soledad Griffa on 28 October 2017, at the Club Union Central in Villa María, Argentina.

She broke the losing streak with a UD victory against Anahi Yolanda Salles in August 2018, before defeating Cintia Gisela Castillo to capture the vacant FAB female featherweight title on 6 July 2019, at the Club Social y Plottier in Plottier, Argentina.

Her next fight came against WBO female junior lightweight champion Ewa Brodnicka on 4 October 2019, at the Hala Sportowa Częstochowa in Częstochowa, Poland. Matthysse suffered the eleventh defeat of her career, losing via split decision (SD) with two judges scoring the bout 97–93 and 96–94 in favour of Brodnicka, while the third judge scored it 96–95 for Matthysse.

Matthysse challenged WBC and IBO female super-featherweight World champion Alycia Baumgardner at Manchester Arena, Manchester, England, on 16 April 2022, losing the fight by unanimous decision with all three ringside judges' scorecards reading 100-90.

She fought Elif Nur Turhan for the vacant WBF female light-welterweight title at City Square in Tetovo, North Macedonia, on 29 July 2023, losing via unanimous decision.

Matthysse faced Samantha Worthington for the WBA female super-lightweight championship at Little Caesars Arena in Detroit, Michigan, USA, on 22 February 2026. She won when her opponent retired at the end of the eighth round, thus becoming a two-division champion.

== Professional boxing record ==
38 fights	21 wins	16 losses
By knockout	4	0
By decision	17	16
Draws	1	

No.	Result	Record	Opponent	Type	Round, time	Date	Location	Notes
38	Win	21–16–1	Samantha Worthington	RTD	8 (10), 2:00	22 Feb 2026	Little Caesars Arena, Detroit, Michigan, U.S.	Won Interim WBA female light-welterweight title
37	Win	20–16–1	Lilian Dolores Silva	TKO	3 (8)	11 Jul 2025	Gimnasio Municipal Nº 1, Trelew, Argentina	
36	Win	19–16–1	Kalliopi Kourouni	TKO	3 (10), 0:48	7 Jun 2024	Seminole Hard Rock Hotel and Casino, Hollywood, U.S.	Won vacant WBC Silver super-featherweight title
35	Win	18–16–1	(Argentina) Victoria Noelia Bustos	UD	10	13 Apr 2024	Club Deportivo Jorge Newbery, Galvez, Argentina	For the Federacion Argentina de Box Argentinian super-featherweight title
34	Loss	17–16–1	(Argentina) Karen Elizabeth Carabajal	UD	10	10 Feb 2024	Gimnasio Municipal Enrique Mosconi, Cutral Có, Argentina	For the vacant South American female super-featherweight title
33	Loss	17–15–1	(Turkey) Elif Nur Turhan	UD	10	29 Jul 2023	(North Macedonia) City Square, Tetovo, Macedonia	For the vacant WBF female super-lightweight World title
32	Loss	17–14–1	(Kenya) Sarah Achieng	MD	10	10 Jun 2023	Charter Hall, Nairobi, Kenya	
31	Loss	17–13–1	(Germany) Nina Meinke	UD	10	5 Nov 2022	Porsche Zentrum, Hamburg, Germany	For the Global Boxing Union female featherweight World title and the WIBF World featherweight title
30	Loss	17–12–1	(United States) Alycia Baumgardner	UD	10	17 Apr 2022	(United Kingdom) AO Arena, Manchester, England	For WBC and IBO female super featherweight titles
29	Win	17–11–1	(Argentina) Laura Soledad Griffa	UD	8	25 Sep 2021	Club Ferro Carril Oeste, Merlo, Argentina	
28	Loss	16–11–1	(Poland) Ewa Brodnicka	SD	10	4 Oct 2019	Hala Sportowa Częstochowa, Częstochowa, Poland	For WBO female junior lightweight title
27	Win	16–10–1	(Argentina) Cintia Gisela Castillo	SD	10	6 Jul 2019	Club Social y Deportivo Plottier, Plottier, Argentina	Won vacant FAB female featherweight title
26	Win	15–10–1	(Mexico) Anahi Yolanda Salles	UD	8	4 Aug 2018	Club Ex Obreros del Chocón, Senillosa, Argentina	
25	Loss	14–10–1	(Argentina) Laura Soledad Griffa	UD	10	28 Oct 2017	Club Union Central, Villa María, Argentina	For South American female super bantamweight title
24	Loss	14–9–1	(Argentina) Natalia Vanesa del Valle Aguirre	UD	6	24 Jun 2017	Club Atlético y Biblioteca Newell's Old Boys, Laguna Larga, Argentina	
23	Loss	14–8–1	(Canada) Jelena Mrdjenovich	UD	10	11 Mar 2016	Shaw Conference Centre, Edmonton, Alberta, Canada	Lost WBA and WBC female featherweight titles
22	Win	14–7–1	(Canada) Jelena Mrdjenovich	UD	10	1 Aug 2015	Ce.De.M. No.2, Caseros, Argentina	Retained WBA female featherweight title; Won WBC female featherweight title
21	Win	13–7–1	(Bolivia) Lizbeth Crespo	UD	8	9 May 2015	Gimnasio Municipal Néstor Carlos Kirchner, Sarmiento, Argentina	
20	Loss	12–7–1	(Argentina) Marcela Acuña	UD	10	23 Aug 2014	Sociedad Alemana de Gimnasia de Villa Ballester, Buenos Aires, Argentina	For WBO female junior featherweight title
19	Win	12–6–1	(Venezuela) Ogleidis Suárez	UD	10	13 Dec 2013	Teatro Griego Juan Pablo Segundo, San Martín, Argentina	Won WBA female featherweight title
18	Loss	11–6–1	(Argentina) Betiana Patricia Viñas	SD	10	27 Sep 2013	Polideportivo La Colonia, Junín, Argentina	For WBC Silver female featherweight title
17	Win	11–5–1	(Argentina) Anahi Yolanda Salles	UD	4	24 Aug 2013	Gimnasio Municipal No.1, Trelew, Argentina	
16	Loss	10–5–1	(Argentina) Marcela Acuña	UD	10	10 May 2013	Auditorio Presidente Néstor Kirchner, Tapiales, Argentina	For vacant IBF Inter-Continental female super bantamweight title
15	Win	10–4–1	(Paraguay) Antonina Ayala Vazquez	UD	8	8 Mar 2013	S.U.M. Saúl Torres, Gobernador Costa, Argentina	
14	Loss	9–4–1	(Mexico) Yazmín Rivas	UD	10	4 Feb 2013	Gimnasio de las Liebres, Río Bravo, Mexico	For IBF female bantamweight title
13	Loss	9–3–1	(Mexico) Jackie Nava	UD	10	8 Oct 2011	Auditorio Municipal, Tijuana, Mexico	
12	Win	9–2–1	(Argentina) Natalia del Pilar Burga	UD	8	2 Sep 2011	Trelew, Argentina	
11	Loss	8–2–1	(Argentina) Daniela Romina Bermúdez	MD	6	20 Aug 2011	Ce.De.M. No.1, Caseros, Argentina	
10	Win	8–1–1	(Argentina) Daniela Romina Bermúdez	UD	10	15 Apr 2011	Club Estudiantes de Bahía Blanca, Bahía Blanca, Argentina	
9	Win	7–1–1	(Argentina) Cecilia Lujan Rodriguez	SD	4	12 Feb 2011	Polideportivo Municipal, Monte Hermoso, Argentina	
8	Loss	6–1–1	(Argentina) Claudia Andrea Lopez	DQ	4 (8)	20 Aug 2010	José de San Martín, Argentina	
7	Win	6–0–1	(Argentina) Silvia Fernanda Zacarias	UD	6	16 Apr 2010	San Miguel del Monte, Argentina	
6	Win	5–0–1	(Argentina) Florencia Roxana Canteros	UD	4	30 Jan 2010	Club Atlético Racing, Trelew, Argentina	
5	Draw	4–0–1	(Argentina) Maria Eugenia Quiroga	MD	4	26 Jun 2009	Estadio Luna Park, Buenos Aires, Argentina	
4	Win	4–0	(Argentina) Maria Elena Maderna	SD	4	9 May 2009	Estadio Pedro Estremador, Bariloche, Argentina	
3	Win	3–0	(Argentina) Maria Eugenia Quiroga	UD	4	7 Feb 2009	Nuevo Palacio Aurinegro, Puerto Madryn, Argentina	
2	Win	2–0	(Argentina) Guillermina Fernandez	TKO	3 (4)	20 Sep 2008	Nuevo Palacio Aurinegro, Puerto Madryn, Argentina	
1	Win	1–0	(Argentina) Graciela Adriana Becerra	UD	4	18 May 2007	Estadio Socios Fundadores, Comodoro Rivadavia, Argentina	

Sporting positions
Regional boxing titles
Vacant Title last held by Sabrina Maribel Perez	FAB female featherweight champion 6 July 2019 – 4 October 2019; Vacated	Succeeded by N/A
Vacant Title last held by N/A	FAB female featherweight champion 25 September 2021 – 16 April 2022; Vacated	Succeeded by N/A
Vacant Title last held by Victoria Noelia Bustos	FAB female super-featherweight champion 13 April 2024 – present	Incumbent
World boxing titles
Preceded by Ogleidis Suárez	WBA female featherweight champion 13 December 2013 – 11 March 2016	Succeeded by Jelena Mrdjenovich
Preceded by Jelena Mrdjenovich	WBC female featherweight champion 1 August 2015 – 11 March 2016	Succeeded by Jelena Mrdjenovich
