= Carolina Duer =

Argentine boxer

Personal information
- Nickname: La Turca
- Born: Carolina Raquel Duer; August 5, 1978 (age 48) Buenos Aires, Argentina
- Weight: Super-flyweight; Bantamweight; Super-bantamweight

Boxing career
- Stance: Orthodox

Boxing record
- Total fights: 29
- Wins: 20
- Win by KO: 6
- Losses: 7
- Draws: 2

Carolina Raquel Duer (born 5 August 1978) is an Argentine boxer. She formerly held the International Boxing Federation (IBF) bantamweight title, the World Boxing Organization (WBO) bantamweight, and earlier the WBO super flyweight championship.

== Early life and personal ==
Duer was born 5 August 1978, in Buenos Aires, Argentina. She is the daughter of Syrian immigrants.

She is Jewish, attended a Jewish day school and Maccabi club, and celebrated her Bat Mitzvah in the Iona Hebrew Center, a Conservative synagogue. She attended the Jaim Najman Bialik Primary School in Buenos Aires.

== Boxing career ==
Duer won 19 of 20 fights as an amateur, and turned pro in 2007.

Duer became the WBO world super flyweight champion (fighters weighing 112 pounds to 115 pounds) in December 2010, and defended that title six times.

She won the WBO world bantamweight title in July 2013, and in July 2014, Duer defeated Ana Maria Lozano of Venezuela by unanimous decision in Lanus, Argentina, in her second defense of the crown in the bantamweight 115- to 118-pound class.

She is the eighth Argentine woman to hold a WBO boxing championship, and the first Jewish one.

On August 26, 2016, and after a pause in her career due to her maternity, Duer won for the third time the IBF world bantamweight after defeating the Brazilian boxer Aline Scaranello by technical knockout. She lost the title in her first defense, to María Cecilia Román, by split decision.

== Television ==
In 2013 Duer took part in the reality TV show Celebrity Splash! (Argentina), which teaches celebrities the art of diving.

Duer began to announce boxing in 2014 on National Public Television.

Reality shows
Year	Title	Role	Notes
2013	Celebrity Splash!	Contestant	Eliminated in Round 2 – Part 3
2014	Combate	Trainer of Green team	Retired
2023	The Challenge Argentina: El Desafío	Contestant	1st eliminated

== Professional boxing record ==
29 fights	20 wins	7 losses
By knockout	6	0
By decision	14	7
Draws	2	

No.	Result	Record	Opponent	Type	Round, time	Date	Location	Notes
29	Loss	20-7-2	(Uruguay) Gabriela Bouvier	SD	10 (10)	2023-04-29	Polideportivo Los Polvorines, Los Polvorines, Argentina	For the vacant Interim WBC female super-bantamweight Silver title
28	Win	20-6-2	(Argentina) Silvia Fernanda Zacarias	UD	4 (4)	2021-08-12	(Argentina) Escuela de Boxeo Santos Zacarías, Rafael Calzada	
27	Draw	19-6-2	(Argentina) Marianela Soledad Ramirez	SD	10 (10)	2019-11-29	(Argentina) Estadio polideportivo, Villa de Mayo	For South American Female Super Bantamweight title
26	Loss	19-6-1	(Mexico) Mariana Juárez	UD	10 (10)	2019-10-12	(Mexico) Centro de Convenciones, Fresnillo	For WBC female bantamweight title
25	Loss	19-5-1	(Argentina) María Cecilia Román	SD	10 (10)	2018-08-04	(Argentina) Estadio Aldo Cantoni, San Juan	For IBF female bantamweight title
24	Loss	19-4-1	(Argentina) María Cecilia Román	SD	10 (10)	2017-08-04	Salon Tattersall, San Isidro, Argentina	For IBF female bantamweight title
23	Win	19-3-1	(Brazil) Aline de Casia Scaranello	TKO	7	2016-08-26	Buenos Aires, Argentina	Won Interim IBF female bantamweight title
22	Win	18-3-1	(Argentina) Vanesa del Valle Calderón	UD	6	2016-04-15	Polideportivo Cooperativa Tortuguitas, Tortuguitas, Buenos Aires, Argentina	
21	Win	17-3-1	(Venezuela) Ana Lozano	UD	10	2014-07-18	Club Atletico Lanus, Lanús, Buenos Aires, Argentina	Retain WBO female bantamweight title
20	Win	16-3-1	(Mexico) Estrella Valverde	UD	10	2013-12-13	Polideportivo La Patriada, Florencio Varela, Buenos Aires, Argentina	Retain WBO female bantamweight title
19	Win	15-3-1	(Argentina) Mayra Alejandra Gomez	UD	10	2013-07-26	Club Social Alejandro Korn, Alejandro Korn, Buenos Aires, Argentina	Won vacant WBO female bantamweight title
18	Draw	14-3-1	(Argentina) Sabrina Maribel Perez	SD	10	2013-05-24	Instituto San Isidro, Veronica, Buenos Aires, Argentina	For vacant WBO female bantamweight title
17	Win	14-3	(Argentina) Marcela Acuña	UD	10	2012-12-21	Club Universitario, La Plata, Buenos Aires, Argentina	Retain WBO female super flyweight title
16	Win	13-3	(Argentina) Marisa Johanna Portillo	UD	10	2012-10-26	Tecnópolis, Villa Martelli, Buenos Aires, Argentina	Retain WBO female super flyweight title
15	Win	12-3	(Romania) Corina Carlescu	TKO	5	2012-07-06	Club Universitario, La Plata, Buenos Aires, Argentina	Retain WBO female super flyweight title
14	Win	11-3	(Italy) Milena Tronto	TKO	2 (10)	2012-03-03	Anfiteatro Verónica, Veronica, Buenos Aires, Argentina	Retain WBO female super flyweight title
13	Win	10-3	(Uruguay) Maria Jose Nunez	TKO	3 (10)	2011-11-11	Club Atletico Lanus, Lanus, Buenos Aires, Argentina	Retain WBO female super flyweight title
12	Win	9-3	(Serbia) Djendji Fleis	TKO	1 (10)	2011-07-15	Salon Tattersall, San Isidro, Buenos Aires, Argentina	Retain WBO female super flyweight title
11	Win	8-3	(Morocco) Aziza Oubaita	UD	10	2011-03-26	(Argentina) Club Unión Progresista, Villa Angela, Chaco	Retain WBO female super flyweight title
10	Win	7-3	(Italy) Loredana Piazza	UD	10	2010-12-17	(Argentina) Casino Victoria, Victoria, Entre Rios	Won vacant WBO female super flyweight title
9	Win	6-3	(Argentina) Silvia Fernanda Zacarias	UD	10	2010-07-16	Estadio F.A.B., Buenos Aires, Distrito Federal, Argentina	
8	Win	5-3	(Argentina) Anahi Yolanda Salles	UD	6	2010-05-14	Estadio F.A.B., Buenos Aires, Distrito Federal, Argentina	
7	Win	4-3	(Argentina) Yanina Natalia Acuna	SD	4	2009-10-03	Estadio F.A.B., Buenos Aires, Distrito Federal, Argentina	
6	Win	3-3	(Argentina) Yanina Natalia Acuna	SD	4	2009-04-04	Club Social y Deportivo Mar de Ajó, Mar de Ajo, Buenos Aires, Argentina	
5	Loss	2-3	(Argentina) Yanina Natalia Acuna	MD	4	2008-11-29	Club Social y Deportivo 12 de Octubre, Benavídez, Buenos Aires, Argentina	
4	Loss	2-2	(Argentina) Natalia del Pilar Burga	MD	4	2008-09-27	Estadio Municipal, Jovita, Cordoba, Argentina	
3	Loss	2-1	(Argentina) Ivonne Anahi Cordoba	UD	4	2008-08-08	Club Huracán, Tres Arroyos, Buenos Aires, Argentina	
2	Win	2-0	(Argentina) Agustina del Valle Aybar	KO	3 (4)	2007-12-14	Polideportivo Carlos Cerutti, Cordoba, Cordoba, Argentina	
1	Win	1-0	(Argentina) Agustina del Valle Aybar	UD	4	2007-09-15	Estadio U.P.C.N., Los Hornos, Buenos Aires, Argentina	

== See also ==
- List of select Jewish boxers

Sporting positions
World boxing titles
New title	WBO Super flyweight champion December 17, 2010 – 2013; Vacated	Vacant Title next held by Daniela Romina Bermúdez
Vacant Title last held by Daniela Romina Bermúdez	WBO Bantamweight champion July 26, 2013 – 2015; Vacated	Vacant Title next held by Naoko Fujioka
New title	IBF Bantamweight champion Interim title August 26, 2016 – 2017; Promoted to full champion	Vacant
Preceded by Carolina Rodriguez; Stripped	IBF Bantamweight champion 2017 – August 4, 2017	Succeeded by María Cecilia Román
