= Pyongyang Arena =

Sports venue in Pyongyang, North Korea

Coordinates: 39.040°N 125.735°E

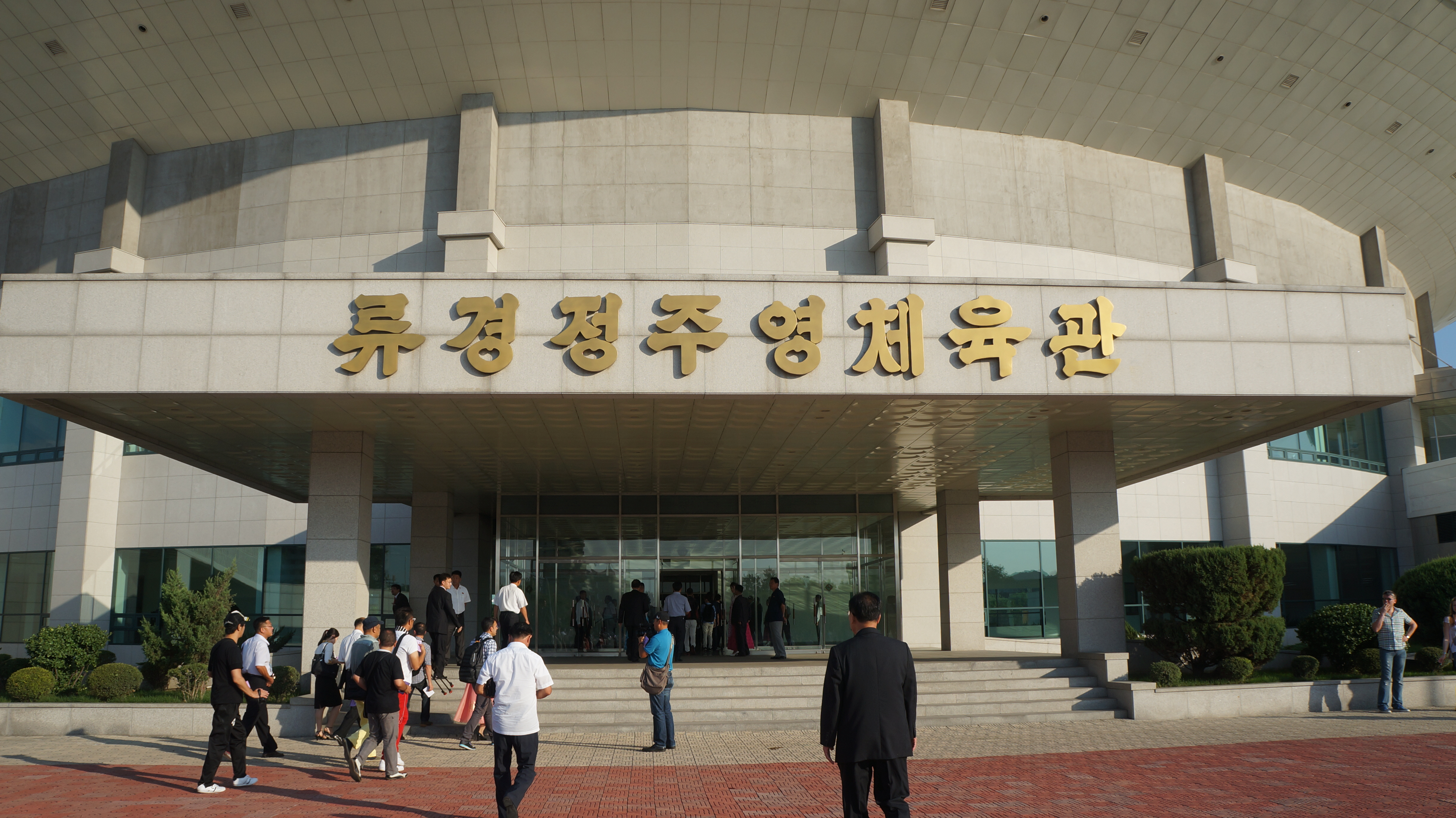

Korean name
- Hangul: 류경정주영체육관
- Hanja: 柳京鄭周永體育館
- RR: Ryugyeong Jeong Juyeong cheyukgwan
- MR: Ryugyŏng Chŏng Chuyŏng ch'eyukkwan

Ryugyong Chung Ju-yung Gymnasium is an indoor sporting arena located in Pyongyang, North Korea. The capacity of the arena is 12,309 and it was built in 2003. It is used to host indoor sporting events, such as basketball and volleyball as well as concerts and art performances.

== See also ==
- Chung Ju-yung
