= Shelly Vincent =

American boxer (born 1979)

Personal information
- Nickname: Shelito's Way
- Born: Michelle Vincent; 11 April 1979 (age 47) New London, Connecticut, USA
- Height: 5 ft 1 in (155 cm)
- Weight: Super-bantamweight, Featherweight

Boxing career
- Reach: 61.5 in (156 cm)
- Stance: Orthodox

Boxing record
- Total fights: 29
- Wins: 27
- Win by KO: 1
- Losses: 2

Shelly Vincent (born 11 April 1979) is an American former professional boxer who held the Universal Boxing Federation and International Boxing Association female super-bantamweight titles. She also challenged for the WBO female featherweight title. Vincent was inducted into the International Women's Boxing Hall of Fame in 2025.

== Career ==
After winning a United States Golden Gloves Championship as an amateur in July 2011, Vincent turned professional later that year.

With a perfect record of 12 wins from 12 pro-fights, she defeated Jackie Trivilino by majority decision to claim the vacant Universal Boxing Federation female super-bantamweight title at Twin River Event Center in Lincoln, Rhode Island, on 7 November 2014, with two of the ringside judges scoring the fight 98–92 and 96–94 respectively in her favour, while the third had it a 95–95 draw.

Returning to the same venue on 3 April 2015, Vincent added the vacant International Boxing Association female super-bantamweight title to her collection with a unanimous decision win over Christina Ruiz.

On 21 August 2016 at Ford Amphitheater in Coney Island, New York, she faced Heather Hardy for the vacant WBC female featherweight International title in the first women's boxing bout televised on NBCSN. Vincent lost the fight, and her unbeaten record, via majority decision with two of the judges' scorecards reading 99–91 and 97–93 respectively for her opponent, overruling the third who saw the contest as a 95–95 tie.

In November 2016, she was named Fighter of the Year at the Connecticut Boxing Hall of Fame Gala.

Vincent met Hardy in a rematch at Madison Square Garden Theater in New York on 27 October 2018, with the vacant WBO female featherweight title on the line. She again lost the bout, this time by unanimous decision.

Following this defeat, she won three fights in succession in 2019 before taking a break from the ring, returning to secure a unanimous decision success against Shelly Barnett over eight rounds at the MassMutual Center in Springfield, Massachusetts, on 27 November 2021.

In 2023, Vincent became the first female fighter to be inducted into the Connecticut Boxing Hall of Fame and two years later she entered the International Women's Boxing Hall of Fame.

== Professional boxing record ==
29 fights	27 wins	2 losses
By knockout	1	0
By decision	26	2

No.	Result	Record	Opponent	Type	Round, time	Date	Location	Notes
29	Win	27–2	Shelly Barnett	UD	8	27 November 2021	MassMutual Center, Springfield, Massachusetts, U.S	
28	Win	26–2	Karen Dulin	UD	6	17 August 2019	MGM Springfield, Springfield, Massachusetts, U.S	
27	Win	25–2	Simone Aparecida da Silva	UD	8	29 June 2019	Dunkin Donuts Center, Providence, Rhode Island, U.S	
26	Win	24–2	Edina Kiss	UD	8	23 February 2019	Twin River Event Center, Lincoln, Rhode Island, U.S	
25	Loss	23–2	Heather Hardy	UD	10	27 October 2018	Madison Square Garden Theater, New York, U.S	For vacant WBO female featherweight title
24	Win	23–1	Calista Silgado	MD	8	21 July 2018	Foxwoods Resort Casino, Mashantucket Pequot Tribal Nation, Ledyard, Connecticut, U.S	
23	Win	22–1	Edina Kiss	MD	10	5 May 2018	Foxwoods Resort Casino, Mashantucket Pequot Tribal Nation, Ledyard, Connecticut, U.S	
22	Win	21–1	Calista Silgado	UD	8	28 October 2017	Foxwoods Resort Casino, Mashantucket Pequot Tribal Nation, Ledyard, Connecticut, U.S	
21	Win	20–1	Angel Gladney	UD	8	15 September 2017	Foxwoods Resort Casino, Mashantucket Pequot Tribal Nation, Ledyard, Connecticut, U.S	
20	Win	19–1	Marquita Lee	UD	8	2 December 2016	Twin River Event Center, Lincoln, Rhode Island, U.S	
19	Loss	18–1	Heather Hardy	MD	10	21 August 2016	Ford Amphitheater, Coney Island, New York, U.S	For vacant WBC female featherweight International title
18	Win	18–0	Christina Ruiz	MD	8	21 July 2016	Foxwoods Resort Casino, Mashantucket Pequot Tribal Nation, Ledyard, Connecticut, U.S	
17	Win	17–0	Elizabeth Anderson	UD	6	16 April 2016	Foxwoods Resort Casino, Mashantucket Pequot Tribal Nation, Ledyard, Connecticut, U.S	
16	Win	16–0	Renata Domsodi	UD	6	27 January 2016	BB King Blues Club & Grill, New York, U.S	
15	Win	15–0	Brittany Cruz	UD	8	12 September 2015	Foxwoods Resort Casino, Mashantucket Pequot Tribal Nation, Ledyard, Connecticut, U.S	
14	Win	14–0	Christina Ruiz	UD	10	3 April 2015	Twin River Event Center, Lincoln, Rhode Island, U.S	Retained Universal Boxing Federation female super-bantamweight title; won vacant International Boxing Association female super-bantamweight title
13	Win	13–0	Jackie Trivilino	MD	10	7 November 2014	Twin River Event Center, Lincoln, Rhode Island, U.S	Won vacant Universal Boxing Federation female super-bantamweight title
12	Win	12–0	Nydia Feliciano	MD	4	2 July 2014	Foxwoods Resort Casino, Mashantucket Pequot Tribal Nation, Ledyard, Connecticut, U.S	
11	Win	11–0	Lakeysha Williams	UD	6	31 May 2014	Mohegan Sun, Uncasville, Connecticut, U.S	
10	Win	10–0	Alisah McPhee	TKO	4 (6), 0:52	2 November 2013	Foxwoods Resort Casino, Mashantucket Pequot Tribal Nation, Ledyard, Connecticut, U.S	
9	Win	9–0	Angel Gladney	UD	8	17 May 2013	Twin River Event Center, Lincoln, Rhode Island, U.S	
8	Win	8–0	Mikayla Nebel	UD	4	1 March 2013	Foxwoods Resort Casino, Mashantucket Pequot Tribal Nation, Ledyard, Connecticut, U.S	
7	Win	7–0	Nydia Feliciano	UD	6	19 January 2013	Mohegan Sun, Uncasville, Connecticut, U.S	
6	Win	6–0	Sherine Thomas	UD	6	29 November 2012	Twin River Event Center, Lincoln, Rhode Island, U.S	
5	Win	5–0	Ivana Coleman	UD	4	18 October 2012	Twin River Event Center, Lincoln, Rhode Island, U.S	
4	Win	4–0	Ivana Coleman	UD	4	21 July 2012	Mohegan Sun, Uncasville, Connecticut, U.S	
3	Win	3–0	Carmen Cruz	UD	4	24 May 2012	Twin River Event Center, Lincoln, Rhode Island, U.S	
2	Win	2–0	Karen Dulin	UD	4	30 March 2012	Foxwoods Resort Casino, Mashantucket Pequot Tribal Nation, Ledyard, Connecticut, U.S	
1	Win	1–0	Karen Dulin	UD	4	7 October 2011	Twin River Event Center, Lincoln, Rhode Island, U.S	
