= Argentina Boxing Federation =

Sports governing body in Argentina

- Abbreviation: ABF/FAB
- Formation: 1920
- Type: Non-profit Institution
- Purpose: Boxing sanctioning organization
- Headquarters: Buenos Aires, Argentina
- Region served: Argentina
- Affiliations: World Boxing
- Website: faboxeo.com.ar

The Argentina Boxing Federation (Spanish: Federación Argentina de Boxeo or FAB) is the agency that is dedicated to regulate the rules of boxing in Argentina. It was founded on March 23, 1920.

== Champions ==
Weight class:	Champion:	Reign began:
Strawweight	(Argentina) Hugo Verchelli	16 November 2012
Light Flyweight	vacant	
Flyweight	(Argentina) Juan José Jurado	20 June 2015
Super Flyweight	(Argentina) Roberto Sosa	6 November 2009
Bantamweight	vacant	
Super Bantamweight	(Argentina) Julián Aristule	14 September 2015
Featherweight	(Argentina) Matías Rueda	18 October 2013
Super Featherweight	(Argentina) Ezequiel Fernández	12 December 2014
Lightweight	(Argentina) Pablo Barboza	25 July 2015
Light Welterweight	(Argentina) Xavier Luques Castillo	10 July 2015
Welterweight	(Argentina) César Barrionuevo	12 September 2015
Light Middleweight	(Argentina) Javier Maciel	20 July 2012
Middleweight	(Argentina) Cristian Ríos	29 August 2014
Super Middleweight	(Argentina) Ezequiel Maderna	5 March 2011
Light Heavyweight	(Argentina) Roberto Bolonti	20 August 2011
Cruiserweight	(Argentina) Daniel Sanabria	26 September 2014
Heavyweight	(Argentina) Matías Vidondo	30 August 2013

- (correct as of 30 September 2015)

== See also ==
- List of boxing organisations
