= Marisa Gabriela Núñez =

Argentine boxer (born 1984)

Personal information
- Nickname: La Brava ("The Brave")
- Born: January 31, 1984 (age 42) Tandil, Argentina
- Weight: Lightweight; Light welterweight; Light middleweight

Boxing career
- Stance: Orthodox

Boxing record
- Total fights: 24
- Wins: 8
- Win by KO: 1
- Losses: 13
- Draws: 3

Marisa Gabriela Núñez (born January 31, 1984) is an Argentine former professional boxer.

== Professional career ==
Núñez turned professional in 2010 and compiled a record of 6–5–2 before facing & defeating Mónica Acosta, to win the vacant IBF light-welterweight title. She would attempt to add the WBO title in 2016 by facing Adela Celeste Peralta, she would lose via unanimous decision. Núñez would face future light-middleweight champion Marie-Eve Dicaire in 2018, she would lose via majority decision.

== Professional boxing record ==
24 fights	8 wins	13 losses
By knockout	1	1
By decision	7	11
By disqualification	0	1
Draws	3	

No.	Result	Record	Opponent	Type	Round, time	Date	Location	Notes
24	Loss	8–13–3	Dilar Kisikyol	UD	10	2024-03-16	Vogelsanghalle, Stralsund, Germany	For WIBF lightweight title
23	Loss	8–12–3	Beke Bas	MD	10	2022-10-08	Stadthalle, Detmold, Germany	For vacant IBA lightweight title
22	Draw	8–11–3	Lorena Edith Agoutborde	MD	4	2022-08-19	Club Social y Deportivo El Fortín, Olavarría, Argentina	
21	Loss	8–11–2	Lizbeth Crespo	UD	8	2019-02-22	Gimnasio Municipal Nº 2, Puerto Madryn, Argentina	
20	Loss	8–10–2	Macarena Ayelen Ledesma	UD	10	2019-01-19	Polideportivo Municipal Luis Monti, Escobar Partido, Argentina	Lost Argentine lightweight title; For South American lightweight title
19	Win	8–9–2	Ruth Stephanie Aquino	TKO	4 (10)	2018-05-12	Club Union y Progreso, Tandil, Argentina	Won vacant Argentine lightweight title
18	Loss	7–9–2	Marie-Eve Dicaire	MD	10	2018-02-15	Montreal Casino, Montreal, Canada	For vacant NABF light-middleweight title
17	Loss	7–8–2	Chris Namús	UD	6	2017-04-13	Club Plaza Colonia, Colonia del Sacramento, Uruguay	
16	Loss	7–7–2	Érica Farías	UD	10	2016-11-19	Ce.De.C Nº 1, San Fernando, Argentina	For WBC light-welterweight title
15	Loss	7–6–2	Adela Celeste Peralta	UD	10	2016-05-14	Polideportivo Municipal, Rauch, Argentina	Lost IBF light-welterweight title; For vacant WBO light-welterweight title
14	Win	7–5–2	Mónica Acosta	MD	10	2014-09-12	Estadio Deportistas Alvearenses, General Alvear, Argentina	Won vacant IBF light-welterweight title
13	Win	6–5–2	Monica Elizabeth Galeano	UD	10	2014-05-31	Club Atlético y Social Bella Vista, Bella Vista, Argentina	Won vacant South American light-welterweight title
12	Draw	5–5–2	Gabriela Marcela Zapata	MD	6	2014-04-19	Fray Luis Beltrán, Argentina	
11	Win	5–5–1	Katia Alvarino	SD	8	2013-12-20	Radisson Victoria Plaza, Montevideo, Uruguay	
10	Loss	4–5–1	Betiana Viñas	KO	4 (6), 1:12	2012-10-06	Polideportivo Gustavo Toro Rodriguez, San Martín, Argentina	
9	Loss	4–4–1	Maria Eugenia Lopez	DQ	4 (4)	2012-08-24	Auditorio Presidente Néstor Kirchner, Tapiales, Argentina	
8	Win	4–3–1	Maria Eugenia Lopez	SD	4	2012-07-20	Club Sportivo Escobar, Escobar Partido, Argentina	
7	Loss	3–3–1	Yohana Alfonzo	UD	6	2012-05-11	Sociedad Española, San Luis, Argentina	
6	Loss	3–2–1	Victoria Bustos	UD	4	2012-03-02	Club El Ciclon, Rosario, Argentina	
5	Win	3–1–1	Linda Laura Lecca	SD	4	2011-01-29	Polideportivo Municipal, Monte Hermoso, Argentina	
4	Loss	2–1–1	Ana Esteche	UD	4	2011-01-14	Estadio Fortunato Bonelli, San Nicolás de los Arroyos, Argentina	
3	Win	2–0–1	Daiana Laura Marin	PTS	4	2010-12-04	Polideportivo Vicente Polimeni, Las Heras, Argentina	
2	Draw	1–0–1	Linda Laura Lecca	SD	4	2010-11-06	Estadio F.A.B., Buenos Aires, Argentina	
1	Win	1–0	Nerina Elizabeth Salafia	UD	4	2010-10-08	Club Union y Progreso, Tandil, Argentina	

== See also ==
- List of female boxers

Sporting positions
Regional boxing titles
New title	South American light-welterweight champion May 31, 2014 – September 12, 2014; Won world title	Vacant Title next held by Maira Moneo
Vacant Title last held by Victoria Bustos	Argentine lightweight champion May 12, 2018 – January 19, 2019	Succeeded by Macarena Ayelen Ledesma
World boxing titles
Vacant Title last held by Myriam Lamare	IBF light-welterweight champion September 12, 2014 – May 14, 2016	Succeeded by Adela Celeste Peralta
