= María Maderna =

Argentine boxer (born 1978)

Personal information
- Nickname: Tily
- Born: María Elena Maderna; September 1, 1978 (age 47) Buenos Aires, Argentina
- Height: 5 ft 9 1/2 in (177 cm)
- Weight: Super featherweight; Lightweight; Welterweight

Boxing career
- Reach: 72 in (183 cm)
- Stance: Orthodox

Boxing record
- Total fights: 37
- Wins: 18
- Win by KO: 2
- Losses: 16
- Draws: 3

María Elena Maderna (born September 1, 1978) is an Argentine professional boxer.

== Professional career ==
Maderna turned professional in 2008 and compiled a record of 9–8–3 before facing Enis Pacheco for the vacant WBO lightweight title, she would win via majority decision. Alfonzo would defend the title three times including against Dalia Vasarhelyi. Maderna would lose the title to Amanda Serrano in her fourth defense of the title.

== Professional boxing record ==
37 fights	18 wins	16 losses
By knockout	2	5
By decision	16	11
Draws	3	

No.	Result	Record	Opponent	Type	Round, time	Date	Location	Notes
37	Loss	18–16–3	Michaela Kotaskova	KO	2 (10), 0:17	2023-12-02	Hotel InterContinental, Vienna, Austria	For WBF Intercontinental welterweight title
36	Loss	18–15–3	Choi Hyun-mi	UD	10	2023-07-15	Suwon Gymnasium, Suwon, South Korea	
35	Loss	18–14–3	Patricia Berghult	RTD	3 (10), 2:00	2023-03-04	Tegelbruket, Örebro, Sweden	
34	Win	18–13–3	Nerina Elizabeth Salafia	UD	6	2022-11-18	Club Defensores de Haedo, Haedo, Argentina	
33	Win	17–13–3	Nerina Elizabeth Salafia	UD	4	2022-09-09	Sociedad de Fomento Rafael Castillo, Rafael Castillo, Argentina	
32	Win	16–13–3	Alejandra Soledad Morales	UD	4	2017-04-08	Gimnasio Municipal Enrique Mosconi, Cutral Có, Argentina	
31	Loss	15–13–3	Brenda Karen Carabajal	RTD	3 (10), 2:00	2016-07-29	Federación Jujeña de Básquetbol, San Salvador de Jujuy, Argentina	For Argentine super-featherweight title
30	Loss	15–12–3	Rose Volante	KO	2 (10), 1:05	2015-09-19	Gym Prime, São Paulo, Brazil	For vacant WBC Latino lightweight title
29	Loss	15–11–3	Yohana Alfonzo	UD	10	2015-07-24	Polideportivo Municipal La Patriada, Florencio Varela, Argentina	For vacant WBO lightweight title
28	Win	15–10–3	Maria Angelica Ruiz	UD	8	2015-05-09	Centro de Educación Física N° 6, Las Flores, Argentina	
27	Loss	14–10–3	Ruth Stephanie Aquino	UD	10	2015-01-30	Anfiteatro Verónica, Verónica, Argentina	For vacant South American lightweight title
26	Win	14–9–3	Maria Angelica Ruiz	UD	6	2014-12-19	Club 1º de Mayo, Remedios de Escalada, Argentina	
25	Loss	13–9–3	Amanda Serrano	KO	6 (10), 0:54	2014-08-15	Estadio F.A.B., Buenos Aires, Argentina	Lost WBO lightweight title
24	Win	13–8–3	Angela Marciales	RTD	7 (10), 0:01	2014-05-30	Auditorio Presidente Néstor Kirchner, Tapiales, Argentina	Retained WBO lightweight title
23	Win	12–8–3	Dalia Vasarhelyi	TKO	3 (10), 0:57	2014-04-04	Polideportivo Municipal La Patriada, Florencio Varela, Argentina	Retained WBO lightweight title
22	Win	11–8–3	Diana Ayala	UD	10	2013-12-20	Racing Club, Avellaneda, Argentina	Retained WBO lightweight title
21	Win	10–8–3	Enis Pacheco	MD	10	2013-06-14	Centro de Educación Física N° 6, Las Flores, Argentina	Won WBO lightweight title
20	Loss	9–8–3	Claudia Andrea López	UD	10	2012-10-05	Auditorio Presidente Néstor Kirchner, Tapiales, Argentina	For vacant IBF super-featherweight title
19	Win	9–7–3	Antonina Ayala Vazquez	UD	10	2012-05-18	Centro de Educación Física N° 6, Las Flores, Argentina	Won vacant South American lightweight title
18	Win	8–7–3	Paula Andrea Morales	UD	10	2011-11-25	Las Flores, Argentina	
17	Win	7–7–3	Pamela Elisabeth Benavidez	UD	10	2011-05-14	Las Flores, Argentina	Won vacant Argentine lightweight title
16	Win	6–7–3	Roxana Raquel Peralta	UD	4	2010-12-18	Boca Juniors, Coronel Suárez, Argentina	
15	Win	5–7–3	Soledad Fuentes	UD	4	2010-10-22	Las Flores, Argentina	
14	Draw	4–7–3	Soledad Fuentes	PTS	4	2010-10-02	La Humada, Argentina	
13	Loss	4–7–2	Paula Andrea Morales	PTS	4	2009-12-12	Hipódromo de la Ciudad, Gualeguaychú, Argentina	
12	Loss	4–6–2	Érica Farías	UD	8	2009-09-26	Estadio F.A.B., Buenos Aires, Argentina	
11	Win	4–5–2	Griselda Moreno	UD	4	2009-08-14	Club El Porvenir, Cacharí, Argentina	
10	Loss	3–5–2	Edith Soledad Matthysse	SD	4	2009-05-09	Estadio Pedro Estremador, Bariloche, Argentina	
9	Loss	3–4–2	Maria Eugenia Quiroga	UD	4	2009-04-24	Rosario, Argentina	
8	Draw	3–3–2	Maria del Carmen Montiel	PTS	4	2009-03-27	Club La Forestal, González Catán, Argentina	
7	Loss	3–3–1	Chris Namús	UD	6	2009-01-23	Hotel & Casino Conrad, Punta del Este, Uruguay	
6	Loss	3–2–1	Nicole Woods	UD	8	2008-11-28	Cilindro Municipal, Montevideo, Uruguay	
5	Win	3–1–1	Etel Cristina Arano	UD	4	2008-11-22	Sociedad de Fomento Villa Anita, Moreno, Argentina	
4	Draw	2–1–1	Maria del Carmen Montiel	PTS	4	2008-10-03	Centro de Fomento y Cultura Villa Colombo, Ramos Mejía, Argentina	
3	Win	2–1	Guillermina Fernandez	UD	4	2008-09-05	Carlos Casares, Argentina	
2	Win	1–1	Guillermina Fernandez	UD	4	2008-08-22	Sociedad de Fomento Rafael Castillo, Rafael Castillo, Argentina	
1	Loss	0–1	Chris Namús	UD	6	2008-05-17	Palacio Contador Gastón Guelfi, Montevideo, Uruguay	

== Personal life ==
Maderna was born and raised in Rafael Castillo, Buenos Aires.

== See also ==
- List of female boxers

Sporting positions
Regional boxing titles
New title	Argentine lightweight champion May 14, 2011 – June 14, 2013; Won world title	Vacant Title next held by Victoria Bustos
New title	South American lightweight champion May 18, 2012 – June 14, 2013; Won world title	Vacant Title next held by Ruth Stephanie Aquino
World boxing titles
Preceded by Enis Pacheco	WBO lightweight champion June 14, 2013 – August 15, 2014	Succeeded by Amanda Serrano
