= Chantelle Cameron vs Mary McGee =

2021 boxing match

Road to Undisputed
- Date: 30 October 2021
- Venue: The O2 Arena, Greenwich, London, UK
- Title(s) on the line: WBC, IBF and vacant The Ring light-welterweight titles

Tale of the tape
Boxer	Chantelle Cameron	Mary McGee
Nickname	"Il Capo"	"Merciless"
Hometown	Northampton, East Midlands, UK	Gary, Indiana, U.S.
Pre-fight record	14–0 (8 KO)	27–3 (1) (15 KO)
Age	30 years, 5 months	35 years, 1 month
Height	5 ft 8 in (173 cm)	5 ft 6 in (168 cm)
Weight	139 1/2 lb (63 kg)	139 3/4 lb (63 kg)
Style	Orthodox	Orthodox
Recognition	WBC; Light Welterweight Champion; The Ring; No. 1 Ranked Light Welterweight; The Ring pound-for-pound No. 8 ranked fighter	IBF; Light Welterweight Champion; The Ring; No. 2 Ranked Light Welterweight

Result
- Cameron defeated McGee via UD (100–90, 99–91, 99–92)

Chantelle Cameron vs. Mary McGee, billed as "The Road to Undisputed", was a professional boxing match contested on 30 October 2021, for the WBC, IBF and The Ring light-welterweight championship. The bout took place at The O2 Arena in London.

== Background ==
McGee won the vacant IBF title in December 2019 after defeating Ana Laura Esteche via tenth-round technical knockout in New York. Following a successful defence of her title, McGee was scheduled to face Victoria Bustos in a unification bout with the vacant WBO title also on the line. However, the bout was cancelled after McGee suffered an injury during training.

Cameron defeated Adriana Araújo via unanimous decision to capture the vacant WBC female title in October 2020, followed by a successful defence against Melissa Hernández in May 2021. In September, a four-woman light-welterweight championship tournament was announced for 30 October. Billed as "Road to Undisputed", the tournament was an attempt to crown an undisputed champion, seeing Cameron face McGee for the WBC and IBF titles while WBA champion Kali Reis faced Jessica Camara, with the vacant WBO title also on the line.

== The fight ==
Cameron defeated McGee via unanimous decision.

== Fight card ==
Confirmed bouts:

Weight Class		vs.		Method	Round	Time	Notes
Light-welterweight	Chantelle Cameron (c)	def.	Mary McGee (c)	UD	10		^{Note 1}
Heavyweight	Alen Babić	def.	Éric Molina	KO	2/8	2:33
Light-heavyweight	Craig Richards	def.	Marek Matyja	TKO	6/10	2:34
Heavyweight	Johnny Fisher	def.	Alvaro Terrero	TKO	2 (6)	1:30
Super-featherweight	Jorge Castaneda	def.	Youssef Khoumari	MD	10		^{Note 2}
Preliminary bouts
Super-bantamweight	Ellie Scotney	def.	Eva Cantos	PTS	8
Cruiserweight	Jordan Thompson	def.	Piotr Podlucki	KO	1/6	2:52
Super-middleweight	John Hedges	def.	Antony Woolery	PTS	6
Heavyweight	Thomas Carty	def.	Igors Vasiljevs	KO	3 (4)	2:49

^Note 1 For WBC, IBF, and inaugural The Ring light-welterweight titles
^Note 2 For vacant WBC International Silver super-featherweight title

Preceded by vs. Melissa Hernández	Chantelle Cameron's bouts 30 October 2021	Succeeded by vs. Victoria Bustos
Preceded by vs. Deanha Hobbs	Mary McGee's bouts 30 October 2021	Succeeded by vs. Dahianna Santana
