= Ana Esteche =

Argentine boxer (born 1990)

Personal information
- Nickname: La Monita
- Born: Ana Laura Esteche; September 6, 1990 (age 35) Buenos Aires, Argentina
- Height: 5 ft 6 in (168 cm)
- Weight: Lightweight; Light welterweight

Boxing career
- Stance: Orthodox

Boxing record
- Total fights: 23
- Wins: 14
- Win by KO: 2
- Losses: 6
- Draws: 3

Ana Laura Esteche (born September 6, 1990) is an Argentine former professional boxer. She is a former unified female light-welterweight world champion.

== Professional career ==
Esteche turned professional in 2011 and compiled a record of 9–3–1 before defeating Monica Acosta on 18 January 2014 to win the WBA female light-welterweight title. She became unified champion on 4 November 2016, by defeating IBF and WBO title holder Adela Celeste Peralta via unanimous decision. Esteche's final fight took place on 5 December 2019 against Mary McGee for the vacant IBF female light-welterweight title. She lost via stoppage in the a 10th and final round.

== Professional boxing record ==
| 23 fights | 14 wins | 6 losses |
|---|---|---|
| By knockout | 2 | 1 |
| By decision | 12 | 5 |
| Draws | 3 | |

| No. | Result | Record | Opponent | Type | Round, time | Date | Location | Notes |
|---|---|---|---|---|---|---|---|---|
| 23 | Loss | 14–6–3 | Mary McGee | TKO | 10 (10) | 2019-12-05 | Terminal 5, New York City, New York, U.S. | For vacant IBF female light-welterweight title |
| 22 | Win | 14–5–3 | Maria Angelica Ruiz | UD | 6 | 2019-07-12 | Ringo Boxing Club, San Francisco Solano, Argentina | |
| 21 | Loss | 13–5–3 | Érica Farías | UD | 10 | 2017-12-29 | Club Ferrocarril de Concordia, Concordia, Argentina | |
| 20 | Win | 13–4–3 | Adela Celeste Peralta | SD | 10 | 2017-06-03 | Estadio F.A.B., Buenos Aires, Argentina | Retained WBA, IBF and WBO female light-welterweight titles |
| 19 | Win | 12–4–3 | Adela Celeste Peralta | UD | 10 | 2016-11-04 | Estadio F.A.B., Buenos Aires, Argentina | Retained WBA female light-welterweight title; Won IBF and WBO female light-welterweight titles |
| 18 | Draw | 11–4–3 | Farida El Hadrati | MD | 10 | 2016-04-01 | Zénith d'Auvergne, Cournon-d'Auvergne, France | Retained WBA female light-welterweight title |
| 17 | Loss | 11–4–2 | Adela Celeste Peralta | MD | 8 | 2015-07-25 | GAP Disco, Mar del Plata, Argentina | |
| 16 | Win | 11–3–2 | Fernanda Alegre | SD | 10 | 2014-11-29 | Club Atlético, Social y Deportivo Camioneros, Buenos Aires, Argentina | |
| 15 | Draw | 10–3–2 | Svetlana Kulakova | SD | 10 | 2014-06-01 | Mytishchi Arena, Mytishchi, Russia | Retained WBA female light-welterweight title |
| 14 | Win | 10–3–1 | Mónica Acosta | UD | 10 | 2014-01-18 | Club Social de Pesca Nautica Y Fomento, San Clemente del Tuyú, Argentina | Won WBA female light-welterweight title |
| 13 | Loss | 9–3–1 | Victoria Bustos | UD | 10 | 2013-09-21 | Club Sportivo America, Rosario, Argentina | For vacant IBF and Argentine female lightweight titles |
| 12 | Win | 9–2–1 | Paula Andrea Morales | UD | 6 | 2013-07-05 | Club Social y Deportivo Nahuel, Florencio Varela, Argentina | |
| 11 | Win | 8–2–1 | Maria Angelica Ruiz | UD | 6 | 2013-02-09 | Club Atlético Vélez Sarsfield, Liniers, Argentina | |
| 10 | Win | 7–2–1 | Maria Eugenia Lopez | UD | 10 | 2012-12-29 | Club Social y Cultural El Cruce, Malvinas Argentinas Partido, Argentina | |
| 9 | Draw | 6–2–1 | Enis Pacheco | SD | 10 | 2012-10-20 | Coliseo Elias Chegwin, Barranquilla, Colombia | For WBO female lightweight title |
| 8 | Loss | 6–2 | Enis Pacheco | MD | 10 | 2012-06-15 | Coliseo Elias Chegwin, Barranquilla, Colombia | For WBO female lightweight title |
| 7 | Win | 6–1 | Betina Gabriela Garino | TKO | 1 (8) | 2012-04-27 | Ce.De.M. N° 2, Caseros, Argentina | |
| 6 | Win | 5–1 | Silvia Fernanda Zacarias | UD | 6 | 2012-03-23 | Club Atlético y Social Villa Calzada, Rafael Calzada, Argentina | |
| 5 | Win | 4–1 | Nerina Elizabeth Salafia | TKO | 3 (4) | 2012-01-13 | Ferro Carril Oeste, Caballito, Argentina | |
| 4 | Win | 3–1 | Paula Andrea Morales | SD | 4 | 2011-08-27 | Club Banco Provincia, City Bell, Argentina | |
| 3 | Win | 2–1 | Rosana Melgar | UD | 4 | 2011-06-24 | Ce.De.M. N° 2, Caseros, Argentina | |
| 2 | Loss | 1–1 | Betiana Viñas | MD | 6 | 2011-04-09 | Federación Mendocina de Box, Mendoza, Argentina | |
| 1 | Win | 1–0 | Marisa Gabriela Núñez | UD | 4 | 2011-01-14 | Estadio Fortunato Bonelli, San Nicolás de los Arroyos, Argentina | |

== See also ==
- List of female boxers

Sporting positions
World boxing titles
| Preceded by Mónica Acosta | WBA light-welterweight champion January 18, 2014 – 2018; Vacated | Succeeded by Anahí Ester Sánchez; Promoted from interim champion |
| Preceded by Adela Celeste Peralta | IBF light-welterweight champion November 4, 2016 – 2018; Vacated | Succeeded by Victoria Bustos; Promoted from interim champion |
| Preceded by Adela Celeste Peralta | WBO light-welterweight champion November 4, 2016 – 2018; Vacated | Vacant Title next held by Amanda Serrano |
