= Claudia Andrea López =

Argentine boxer (born 1979)

Personal information
- Nicknames: La Chica 10 ("The Girl 10")
- Born: July 4, 1979 (age 47) Trelew, Argentina
- Height: 5 ft 1 1/2 in (156 cm)
- Weight: Bantamweight; Super bantamweight; Featherweight; Super featherweight; Lightweight; Light welterweight; Welterweight

Boxing career
- Reach: 64 1/2 in (164 cm)
- Stance: Southpaw

Boxing record
- Total fights: 44
- Wins: 26
- Win by KO: 6
- Losses: 18

Claudia Andrea López (born July 4, 1979) is an Argentine professional boxer.

== Professional career ==
López turned professional in 2006 & compiled a record of 14–4 before facing Choi Hyun-mi for the WBA featherweight title, she would lose via split decision. López would get another shot a title when she faced Kaliesha West for he WBO bantamweight title, she would lose via majority decision. López got her third opportunity at a world title when she faced compatriot María Maderna for the vacant IBF super-featherweight title, on this occasion López was named the victor via unanimous decision. She would aim for another title when she moved up to in weight to face Victoria Bustos for the IBF lightweight title, however she lost via unanimous decision.

== Professional boxing record ==
44 fights	26 wins	18 losses
By knockout	6	3
By decision	19	15
By disqualification	1	0

No.	Result	Record	Opponent	Type	Round, time	Date	Location	Notes
44	Loss	26–18	Karen Elizabeth Carabajal	UD	8	2025-02-21	Gimnasio Municipal Enrique Mosconi, Cutral Có, Argentina	
43	Loss	26–17	Carolyn Redmond	UD	6	2024-03-30	Hamilton Convention Centre, Hamilton, Canada	
42	Loss	26–16	Yamila Belen Abellaneda	UD	10	2023-11-10	Gimnasio Municipal Enrique Mosconi, Cutral Có, Argentina	For Argentine light-welterweight title
41	Loss	26–15	Ikram Kerwat	UD	10	2023-06-24	Sporthalle, Alfdorf, Germany	For vacant WBF welterweight title
40	Loss	26–14	Lucia Noelia Perez	UD	10	2022-10-21	Estadio Osvaldo Casanova, Bahía Blanca, Argentina	For vacant South American welterweight title
39	Loss	26–13	Yanina del Carmen Lescano	TKO	8 (10)	2021-12-17	Gimnasio Municipal, Concordia, Argentina	For South American lightweight title
38	Loss	26–12	Victoria Bustos	UD	8	2020-12-18	Asociacion Bomberos Voluntarios de Zavalla, Zavalla, Argentina	
37	Win	26–11	Gloria Elena Yancaqueo	UD	4	2019-12-01	Gimnasio Municipal Nº 1, Trelew, Argentina	
36	Loss	25–11	Adriana Araújo	UD	10	2019-10-18	Arena de Lutas, São Paulo, Brazil	For vacant WBC Silver light-welterweight title
35	Loss	25–10	Terri Harper	TKO	6 (10)	2019-05-10	Nottingham Arena, Nottingham, England	
34	Win	25–9	Gladys Soledad Segui	MD	4	2018-10-06	Club Deportivo, Cultural y Social San Martín, Argentina	
33	Loss	24–9	Sandy Tsagouris	TKO	7 (8)	2016-04-22	St. Lawrence Centre for the Arts, Toronto, Canada	
32	Loss	24–8	Victoria Bustos	UD	10	2015-08-22	Club Sportivo America, Rosario, Argentina	For IBF lightweight title
31	Win	24–7	Betiana Viñas	SD	10	2013-11-23	Estadio Pedro Estremador, Bariloche, Argentina	Retained IBF super-featherweight title
30	Win	23–7	Diana Ayala	TKO	4 (10)	2013-08-16	Gimnasio Municipal Nº 1, Comodoro Rivadavia, Argentina	Won vacant IBF super-featherweight title
29	Loss	22–7	Dahianna Santana	UD	10	2013-04-27	Club Atlético Vélez Sarsfield, Liniers, Argentina	For IBF featherweight title
28	Win	22–6	Antonina Ayala Vazquez	UD	10	2012-12-12	Gimnasio Municipal Nº 1, Comodoro Rivadavia, Argentina	
27	Win	21–6	María Maderna	UD	10	2012-10-05	Auditorio Presidente Néstor Kirchner, Tapiales, Argentina	Won vacant IBF super-featherweight title
26	Win	20–6	Antonina Ayala Vazquez	TKO	8 (8)	2012-07-14	S.U.M. Saúl Torres, Gobernador Costa, Argentina	
25	Win	19–6	Silvia Fernanda Zacarias	UD	6	2012-04-27	Ce.De.M. N° 2, Caseros, Argentina	
24	Loss	18–6	Kaliesha West	MD	10	2012-04-14	Auditorio Ernesto Rufo, Rosarito, Mexico	For WBO bantamweight title
23	Win	18–5	Sonia Edith Paladino	UD	8	2011-07-16	Complejo Municipal Gas, Pico Truncado, Argentina	
22	Win	17–5	Verena Crespo	KO	2 (10)	2011-03-18	Trelew, Argentina	Won vacant WBC Latino super-bantamweight title
21	Win	16–5	Sonia Edith Paladino	UD	6	2010-12-09	Trelew, Argentina	
20	Win	15–5	Edith Soledad Matthysse	DQ	4 (8)	2010-08-20	José de San Martín, Argentina	
19	Loss	14–5	Choi Hyun-mi	SD	10	2010-04-30	Sungkyunkwan University, Suwon, South Korea	For WBA featherweight title
18	Win	14–4	Natalia del Pilar Burga	UD	6	2009-12-05	Gimnasio Municipal Nº 1, Puerto Madryn, Argentina	
17	Win	13–4	Betina Gabriela Garino	RTD	6 (10)	2009-06-06	Gimnasio Municipal Nº 1, Trelew, Argentina	
16	Loss	12–4	Maria del Carmen Potenza	TD	4 (4)	2009-02-07	Nuevo Palacio Aurinegro, Puerto Madryn, Argentina	
15	Win	12–3	Pamela Elisabeth Benavidez	TKO	5 (6)	2008-10-10	Trelew, Argentina	
14	Win	11–3	Maria del Carmen Montiel	UD	8	2008-09-05	Gimnasio Juan Bautista Rocha, Río Gallegos, Argentina	
13	Win	10–3	Silvia Fernanda Zacarias	RTD	6 (6)	2008-04-11	Río Gallegos, Argentina	
12	Win	9–3	Maria del Carmen Montiel	UD	8	2008-01-19	Paso de Indios, Argentina	
11	Loss	8–3	Marcela Acuña	UD	8	2007-10-27	Ce.De.M. N° 2, Caseros, Argentina	
10	Win	8–2	Sonia Edith Paladino	UD	6	2007-10-12	Gimnasio Juan Bautista Rocha, Río Gallegos, Argentina	
9	Win	7–2	Maria del Carmen Potenza	UD	10	2007-05-18	Estadio Socios Fundadores, Comodoro Rivadavia, Argentina	
8	Win	6–2	Sonia Edith Paladino	UD	6	2007-03-30	Gimnasio Juan Bautista Rocha, Río Gallegos, Argentina	
7	Loss	5–2	Alejandra Oliveras	SD	8	2006-12-22	Buenos Aires Lawn Tennis Club, Buenos Aires, Argentina	
6	Loss	5–1	Betina Gabriela Garino	UD	6	2006-11-17	Comodoro Rivadavia, Argentina	
5	Win	5–0	Maria del Carmen Montiel	UD	6	2006-11-03	Gimnasio Juan Bautista Rocha, Río Gallegos, Argentina	
4	Win	4–0	Maria del Carmen Montiel	UD	8	2006-10-06	Caleta Olivia, Argentina	
3	Win	3–0	Graciela Adriana Becerra	UD	4	2006-08-18	Trelew, Argentina	
2	Win	2–0	Maria del Carmen Potenza	UD	4	2006-03-31	Gimnasio Municipal Nº 1, Comodoro Rivadavia, Argentina	
1	Win	1–0	Patricia Alejandra Gimenez	UD	4	2006-02-17	Gimnasio Municipal Nº 1, Comodoro Rivadavia, Argentina	

== See also ==
- List of female boxers
- List of southpaw stance boxers

Sporting positions
Regional boxing titles
New title	WBC Latino super-bantamweight champion March 18, 2011 – October 5, 2012; Won world title	Vacant Title next held by Dayana Cordero
World boxing titles
Vacant Title last held by Amanda Serrano	IBF super-featherweight champion October 5, 2012 – 2013; Stripped	Vacant Title next held by Herself
Vacant Title last held by Herself	IBF super-featherweight champion August 16, 2013 – 2014; Vacated	Vacant Title next held by Betiana Viñas
