= Yohana Alfonzo =

Argentine boxer (born 1989)

Personal information
- Nicknames: La Leona ("The Lioness")
- Born: Yohana Belén Alfonzo; August 28, 1989 (age 36) San Luis, Argentina
- Weight: Super featherweight; Lightweight

Boxing career
- Stance: Orthodox

Boxing record
- Total fights: 20
- Wins: 18
- Win by KO: 1
- Losses: 2

Yohana Belén Alfonzo (born August 28, 1989) is an Argentine former professional boxer.

== Professional career ==
Alfonzo turned professional in 2010 and compiled a record of 12–2 before defeating María Maderna to win the vacant WBO lightweight title.

== Professional boxing record ==
20 fights	18 wins	2 losses
By knockout	1	0
By decision	17	2

No.	Result	Record	Opponent	Type	Round, time	Date	Location	Notes
20	Win	18–2	Soledad del Valle Frias	UD	4	2023-06-03	Parque La Pedrera, Villa Mercedes, Argentina	
19	Win	17–2	Gladys Soledad Segui	UD	6	2019-05-04	Salón Azul de AGEC, Villa Parque Santa Ana, Argentina	
18	Win	16–2	Diana Ayala	UD	10	2016-12-10	Estadio Ave Fénix, San Luis, Argentina	Retained WBO lightweight title
17	Win	15–2	Brenda Karen Carabajal	UD	10	2016-04-22	Estadio Ave Fénix, San Luis, Argentina	Retained WBO lightweight title
16	Win	14–2	Angela Marciales	UD	10	2015-10-16	Estadio José María Gatica, Villa Mercedes, Argentina	Retained WBO lightweight title
15	Win	13–2	María Maderna	UD	10	2015-07-24	Polideportivo Municipal La Patriada, Florencio Varela, Argentina	Won vacant WBO lightweight title
14	Win	12–2	Angela Marciales	UD	10	2014-10-18	Estadio José María Gatica, Villa Mercedes, Argentina	Won vacant WBC Latino super-featherweight title
13	Win	11–2	Maria Eugenia Lopez	UD	10	2014-04-11	Estadio José María Gatica, Villa Mercedes, Argentina	Won vacant Argentine super-featherweight title
12	Win	10–2	Natalia Vanesa Lopez	UD	6	2014-01-17	Polideportivo Municipal, Villa Mercedes, Argentina	
11	Loss	9–2	Victoria Bustos	UD	6	2013-06-28	Club Sportivo America, Rosario, Argentina	
10	Win	9–1	Sonia Edith Paladino	UD	4	2013-05-25	Estadio José María Gatica, Villa Mercedes, Argentina	
9	Loss	8–1	Natalia Vanesa del Valle Aguirre	SD	8	2013-02-08	Club Alianza, Jesús María, Argentina	
8	Win	8–0	Maria Terriaza	PTS	8	2012-10-05	Club Deportivo Pringles, La Toma, Argentina	
7	Win	7–0	Marisa Gabriela Núñez	UD	6	2012-05-11	Sociedad Española, San Luis, Argentina	
6	Win	6–0	Noelia Belen Rojo	UD	4	2012-03-16	San Luis, Argentina	
5	Win	5–0	Roxana Rodriguez	UD	4	2011-09-09	Sociedad Española, San Luis, Argentina	
4	Win	4–0	Cecilia Sofia Mena	UD	4	2011-06-10	Club Alberdi, Villa Mercedes, Argentina	
3	Win	3–0	Maria Cristina Ponce	UD	4	2011-03-04	Villa Mercedes, Argentina	
2	Win	2–0	Sonia Edith Paladino	TKO	1 (4)	2010-11-05	Villa Mercedes, Argentina	
1	Win	1–0	Maria Angelica Ruiz	UD	4	2010-08-13	Villa Mercedes, Argentina	

== See also ==
- List of female boxers

Sporting positions
Regional boxing titles
New title	Argentine super-featherweight champion April 11, 2014 – July 24, 2015; Won world title	Vacant Title next held by Brenda Karen Carabajal
New title	WBC Latino super-featherweight champion October 18, 2014 – July 24, 2015; Won world title	Vacant Title next held by Karen Elizabeth Carabajal
World boxing titles
Vacant Title last held by Amanda Serrano	WBO lightweight champion July 24, 2015 – 2017; Stripped	Vacant Title next held by Rose Volante
