= Betiana Viñas =

Argentine boxer (born 1986)

Personal information
- Nickname: La Terrible ("The Terrible")
- Born: Betiana Patricia Alejandra Viñas; May 7, 1986 (age 40) Cipolletti, Argentina
- Height: 5 ft 5 1/2 in (166 cm)
- Weight: Super bantamweight; Featherweight; Super featherweight

Boxing career
- Stance: Orthodox

Boxing record
- Total fights: 22
- Wins: 12
- Win by KO: 2
- Losses: 7
- Draws: 3

Betiana Patricia Alejandra Viñas (born May 7, 1986) is an Argentine former professional boxer.

== Professional career ==
Viñas turned professional in 2009 and compiled a record of 9–5–3 before facing & defeating Claudia Andrea López, to win the vacant IBF super-featherweight title.

== Professional boxing record ==
22 fights	12 wins	7 losses
By knockout	2	0
By decision	10	7
Draws	3	

No.	Result	Record	Opponent	Type	Round, time	Date	Location	Notes
22	Win	12–7–3	Gloria Elena Yancaqueo	UD	10	2017-08-11	Estadio Parque Central, Neuquén, Argentina	Won vacant South American featherweight title
21	Win	11–7–3	Gloria Elena Yancaqueo	UD	6	2017-03-11	Polideportivo Municipal, Chichinales, Argentina	
20	Loss	10–7–3	Marisa Joana Portillo	SD	6	2016-10-22	Estadio cubierto Sub sede Cruce Alberdi, Rosario, Argentina	
19	Loss	10–6–3	Victoria Bustos	UD	8	2015-04-03	Club Sportivo America, Rosario, Argentina	
18	Win	10–5–3	Natalia Vanesa del Valle Aguirre	UD	10	2014-12-19	Polideportivo Gustavo Toro Rodriguez, San Martín, Argentina	Won vacant IBF super-featherweight title
17	Loss	9–5–3	Claudia Andrea López	SD	10	2013-11-23	Estadio Pedro Estremador, Bariloche, Argentina	For IBF super-featherweight title
16	Win	9–4–3	Edith Soledad Matthysse	SD	10	2013-09-27	Polideportivo La Colonia, Junín, Argentina	Retained WBC Silver featherweight title
15	Win	8–4–3	Cynthia Munoz	KO	6 (10), 1:25	2013-05-18	Gimnasio Sthimpra, General Fernández Oro, Argentina	Retained WBC Silver featherweight title
14	Win	7–4–3	Paola Ibarra	UD	10	2012-12-08	Polideportivo Vicente Polimeni, Las Heras, Argentina	Won vacant WBC Silver featherweight title
13	Win	6–4–3	Marisa Gabriela Núñez	KO	4 (6), 1:12	2012-10-06	Polideportivo Gustavo Toro Rodriguez, San Martín, Argentina	
12	Loss	5–4–3	Marcela Acuña	TD	9 (10)	2012-08-17	Club Caja Popular, San Miguel de Tucumán, Argentina	For WBC Silver super-bantamweight title
11	Draw	5–3–3	Migdalia Asprilla	MD	10	2012-05-24	Polideportivo Vicente Polimeni, Las Heras, Argentina	
10	Win	5–3–2	Betina Gabriela Garino	UD	6	2011-11-25	Estadio Pascual Perez, Mendoza, Argentina	
9	Win	4–3–2	Natalia del Pilar Burga	UD	4	2011-06-10	Polideportivo Vicente Polimeni, Las Heras, Argentina	
8	Win	3–3–2	Ana Esteche	MD	6	2011-04-09	Federación Mendocina de Box, Mendoza, Argentina	
7	Loss	2–3–2	Ivonne Anahi Cordoba	UD	4	2010-11-19	Teatro Griego Juan Pablo Segundo, San Martín, Argentina	
6	Draw	2–2–2	Daniela Romina Bermúdez	MD	4	2010-10-09	Polideportivo San Pedro, San Martín, Argentina	
5	Draw	2–2–1	Daniela Romina Bermúdez	MD	4	2010-07-17	Polideportivo Vicente Polimeni, Las Heras, Argentina	
4	Win	2–2	Cecilia Lujan Rodriguez	MD	4	2010-06-19	Polideportivo Vicente Polimeni, Las Heras, Argentina	
3	Loss	1–2	Maria Eugenia Quiroga	MD	4	2009-12-12	Estadio Ruca Che, Neuquén, Argentina	
2	Loss	1–1	Érica Farías	UD	4	2009-07-25	Estadio F.A.B., Buenos Aires, Argentina	
1	Win	1–0	Anabel Amarillo	PTS	4	2009-03-13	Cutral Có, Argentina	

== See also ==
- List of female boxers

Sporting positions
Regional boxing titles
New title	WBC Silver featherweight champion December 8, 2012 – December 19, 2014; Won world title	Vacant Title next held by Ronica Jeffrey
New title	South American featherweight champion August 11, 2017 – 2017; Retired	Vacant Title next held by Danila Ramos
World boxing titles
Vacant Title last held by Claudia Andrea López	IBF super-featherweight champion December 19, 2014 – 2015; Vacated	Vacant Title next held by Anahí Ester Sánchez
