= Juana Barraza =

Mexican professional wrestler and serial killer

- Born: Juana Dayanara Barraza Samperio; 27 December 1957 (age 68); Epazoyucan, Hidalgo, Mexico
- Other names: Mataviejitas (Spanish for "Little Old Lady Killer"); La Dama del Silencio (Spanish for "The Lady of Silence)
- Spouse: Miguel Ángel Quiróz (m. 2015; div. 2016)
- Children: 4 (1 deceased)
- Penalty: 759 years

Details
- Victims: 16 (convicted); 40-48+ (suspected)
- Span of crimes: 1998–2006
- Country: Mexico
- State: Mexico City
- Date apprehended: 25 January 2006
- Imprisoned at: Santa Martha Acatitla

Juana Dayanara Barraza Samperio (born 27 December 1957) is a Mexican convicted serial killer and former professional wrestler known as "La Mataviejitas" ("The Old Lady Killer"). She was convicted of the murders of 16 elderly women and sentenced to 759 years in prison.

The killings attributed to "La Mataviejitas" have been variously dated: some accounts place the first murders in the late 1990s, while at least one source cites a specific killing on 17 November 2003. Authorities and the press have estimated the total number of victims at between 42 and 48 deaths. After Barraza's arrest, officials officially closed the Mataviejitas investigation despite more than 30 unresolved cases.

== Early life ==
Juana Dayanara Barraza Samperio was born in Epazoyucan, Hidalgo, a rural area north of Mexico City. Barraza's mother, Justa Samperio, was an alcoholic who reportedly exchanged her for three beers to a man who repeatedly raped her while in his care, and by whom she became pregnant with a son. She had four children in total, although her eldest son died from injuries sustained in a mugging. Prior to her arrest, Barraza was a professional wrestler under the ring name of La Dama del Silencio (The Lady of Silence). She had a strong interest in lucha libre, a form of Mexican masked professional wrestling. She fought as a ruda (a heel).

== Investigation ==
All of Barraza's victims were women aged sixty or over, many of whom lived alone. Barraza bludgeoned or strangled them before robbing them. Bernardo Bátiz, the chief prosecutor in Mexico City, initially profiled the killer as having "a brilliant mind, [being] quite clever and careful", and suggested that the killer probably struck after gaining the trust of the intended victim. Investigating officers suspected that the killer posed as a government official, offering victims the chance to sign up for welfare programs. The authorities believed that Juana Barraza was a psychopath who felt no remorse. Furthermore, Barraza associated her elderly victims with her mother and believed that she was helping society by killing them.

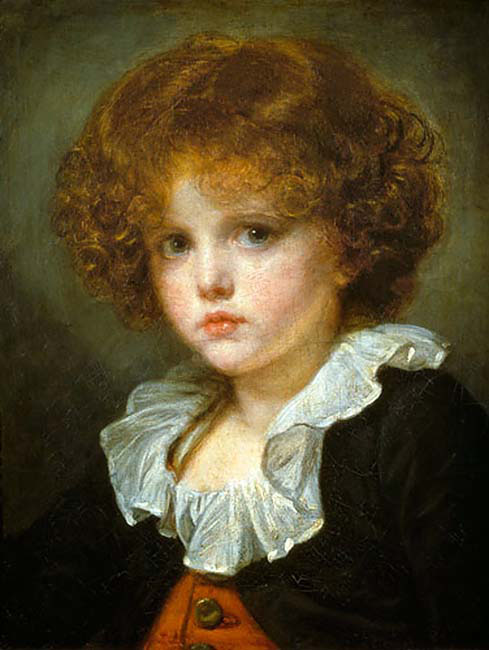
Boy in a Red Waistcoat, by Jean-Baptiste Greuze c. 1775–80, a painting reproduced in prints found in several of the victims' homes

The search for Barraza was complicated by conflicting evidence. At one point, the police hypothesized that two killers might be involved. A coincidence also distracted the investigation: at least three of Barraza's victims owned a print of an eighteenth-century painting by French artist Jean-Baptiste Greuze, Boy in a Red Waistcoat.

The authorities were heavily criticized by the media for dismissing evidence that a serial killer was at work in Mexico City as merely "media sensationalism" as late as the summer of 2005. Soon after setting an investigation in motion, the police incurred further criticism by launching what one journalist described as a "ham-fisted" and unproductive swoop on Mexico City's transvestite prostitutes.

A major breakthrough in the case occurred on 25 January 2006, when Barraza was arrested fleeing from the home of the serial killer's latest victim, Ana María de los Reyes Alfaro, who lived in the Venustiano Carranza borough of Mexico City. Alfaro, 82, had been strangled with a stethoscope. Witnesses at previous murder scenes had described a masculine-looking woman and police had previously looked for a transgender person, although they later admitted that the former wrestler resembled composite images of the suspect.

Mexico City prosecutors said fingerprint evidence linked Barraza to at least ten of the approximately forty murders attributed to the killer. Barraza confessed to murdering Alfaro and three other women, but denied involvement in all other killings. She told reporters that she strangled Alfaro after a dispute over pay for Barraza's maid services.

== Trial, verdict, and life in prison ==
Barraza was tried in the spring of 2008, the prosecution alleging she had been responsible for as many as forty deaths. She admitted to one murder, that of Alfaro, and told the police her motive was lingering resentment regarding her own mother's treatment of her. On 31 March, she was found guilty on sixteen charges of murder and aggravated burglary, including eleven separate counts of murder. She was sentenced to 759 years in prison. Since sentences imposed in Mexican courts are generally served concurrently, but the maximum sentence under Mexican law is sixty years, she will most likely serve the full sentence in prison.

While in prison, Juana Barraza has been working as a gym instructor and selling tacos to support her family. According to news reports, in July 2015, Juana married Miguel Ángel, an inmate who had been convicted of murder. Later, in October 2016, she divorced her husband while serving her sentence.

== See also ==
- List of serial killers by country
- List of serial killers by number of victims
