= Victoria Argueta =

Mexican boxer (born 1990)

Personal information
- Nationality: (Mexico) Mexican
- Born: Victoria Argueta Onofre; 29 December 1990 (age 35)
- Height: 4 ft 10.5 in (149 cm)
- Weight: Minimumweight

Boxing career
- Reach: 59 in (150 cm)
- Stance: Orthodox

Boxing record
- Total fights: 16
- Wins: 14
- Win by KO: 4
- Losses: 2

Victoria Argueta (born 29 December 1990) is a Mexican former professional boxer. She was the IBF female minimumweight champion from May 2014 to February 2015.

== Career ==
Argueta challenged IBF female minimumweight champion Nancy Franco at Arena Solidaridad in Monterrey, Mexico, on 10 May 2014. She won on a unanimous decision.

She defended her title against Alondra Garcia at Auditorio General Arteaga in Querétaro, Mexico, on 9 August 2014, retaining the belt by split decision.

Argueta faced Nancy Franco in a rematch at Centro de Espectaculos in Epazoyucan, Mexico, on 21 February 2015, and lost on a split decision.

== Professional boxing record ==
16 fights	14 wins	2 losses
By knockout	4	0
By decision	10	2

No.	Result	Record	Opponent	Type	Round, time	Date	Location	Notes
16	Win	14–2	Jessica Rangel Gonzalez	UD	6	20 Apr 2019	Plaza Principal, Atotonilco El Alto, Mexico	
15	Loss	13–2	Nancy Franco	SD	10	21 Feb 2015	Centro de Espectáculos, Epazoyucan, Mexico	Lost IBF female mini-flyweight title
14	Win	13–1	Alondra Garcia	SD	10	10 May 2014	Auditorio General Arteaga, Querétaro, Mexico	Retained IBF female mini-flyweight title
13	Win	12–1	Nancy Franco	UD	10	10 May 2014	Arena Solidaridad, Monterrey, Mexico	Won IBF female mini-flyweight title
12	Win	11–1	Suri Tapia	UD	10	8 Jun 2013	Unidad Deportiva, Zihuatanejo, Mexico	Retained WBC Silver female mini-flyweight title
11	Win	10–1	Guadalupe Ramirez	MD	10	2 Mar 2013	Gimnasio Carlos Zárate, Cuautla, Mexico	Won vacant WBC Silver female mini-flyweight title
10	Loss	9–1	Naoko Fujioka	UD	10	28 Oct 2012	Furukawa Sogo Gym, Ōsaki, Japan	For WBC female mini-flyweight title
9	Win	9–0	Magdalena Leija	KO	1 (10), 1:33	23 Jun 2012	Magdalena Mixhuca Sports City, Mexico City, Mexico	Retained Mexican female mini-flyweight title
8	Win	8–0	Mildred Cadena	KO	3 (10), 1:24	7 Apr 2012	Gimnasio Carlos Zárate, Cuautla, Mexico	Retained Mexican female mini-flyweight title
7	Win	7–0	Ivoon Rosas Merino	MD	10	21 Dec 2011	Palazzio Videmar, Mexico City, Mexico	Retained Mexican female mini-flyweight title
6	Win	6–0	Lucia Hernandez Victoriano	UD	10	14 Oct 2011	Salon Marbet Plus, Ciudad Nezahualcóyotl, Mexico	Won vacant Mexican female mini-flyweight title
5	Win	5–0	Lucia Alfaro	UD	4	10 Sep 2011	Gimnasio Carlos Zárate, Cuautla, Mexico	
4	Win	4–0	Guadalupe Ramirez	UD	6	9 Jul 2011	Gimnasio Carlos Zárate, Cuautla, Mexico	
3	Win	3–0	Lucia Hernandez Victoriano	TKO	3 (4), 1:15	12 Mar 2011	Domo Deportivo Metropolitano, Ciudad Nezahualcóyotl, Mexico	
2	Win	2–0	Ivoon Rosas Merino	UD	4	26 Jun 2010	Domo Deportivo Metropolitano, Ciudad Nezahualcóyotl, Mexico	
1	Win	1–0	Claudia Gonzalez	TKO	2 (4)	13 Mar 2010	Domo Deportivo Metropolitano, Ciudad Nezahualcóyotl, Mexico	
