= Enis Pacheco =

Colombian boxer (born 1988)

Personal information
- Nicknames: Huracán ("Hurricane")
- Born: Enis Sofia Pacheco Barrera; March 29, 1988 (age 38) Puerto Escondido, Colombia
- Height: 5 ft 3 in (160 cm)
- Weight: Lightweight; Light welterweight

Boxing career
- Reach: 60 1/2 in (154 cm)
- Stance: Orthodox

Boxing record
- Total fights: 24
- Wins: 17
- Win by KO: 8
- Losses: 5
- Draws: 2

Enis Sofia Pacheco Barrera (born March 29, 1988) is a Colombian former professional boxer.

She began boxing at age 10 after watching training sessions of local boxers such as Walter Estrada and Miguel Barrera.

== Professional career ==
Pacheco turned professional in 2010 & compiled a record of 8–1 before facing & defeating Duda Yankovich for the WBO lightweight title. Her first defense was against Ana Esteche of Argentina. Her final fight was against Victoria Bustos in 2018.

== Professional boxing record ==
24 fights	17 wins	5 losses
By knockout	8	2
By decision	9	3
Draws	2	

No.	Result	Record	Opponent	Type	Round, time	Date	Location	Notes
24	Loss	17–5–2	Victoria Bustos	UD	10	2018-12-01	Estadio Municipal, Pérez, Argentina	For Interim IBF light-welterweight title
23	Win	17–4–2	Celia Rosa Sierra	RTD	9 (10)	2017-03-31	Hotel Prado Mar, Puerto Colombia, Colombia	
22	Win	16–4–2	Glenis Cardona	UD	10	2016-10-29	Coliseo Cubierto, Galapa, Colombia	
21	Loss	15–4–2	Maïva Hamadouche	TKO	2 (10)	2016-05-27	Cirque d'hiver, Paris, France	For vacant WBC Silver lightweight title
20	Win	15–3–2	Yarley Cuadrado	UD	10	2016-04-09	Parque La Dicha, Palmar de Varela, Colombia	
19	Win	14–3–2	Angie Barcas	UD	8	2015-12-05	Coliseo Cubierto, Puerto Colombia, Colombia	
18	Win	13–3–2	Angie Barcas	UD	8	2015-09-26	Coliseo Cubierto, Puerto Colombia, Colombia	
17	Loss	12–3–2	Fernanda Alegre	TKO	8 (10)	2015-04-25	Club Union y Progreso, Tandil, Argentina	For vacant WBO light-welterweight title
16	Win	12–2–2	Angie Barcas	UD	8	2015-02-06	Coliseo Mario de León, Cereté, Colombia	
15	Win	11–2–2	Paola Rojas	UD	6	2014-11-29	Plaza Teresa Sierra, Montelíbano, Colombia	
14	Loss	10–2–2	María Maderna	MD	10	2013-06-14	Centro de Educación Física N° 6, Las Flores, Argentina	Lost WBO lightweight title
13	Draw	10–1–2	Lely Luz Florez	MD	8	2013-04-19	Coliseo del Colegio Biffi La Salle, Barranquilla, Colombia	
12	Draw	10–1–1	Ana Esteche	SD	10	2012-10-20	Coliseo Elias Chegwin, Barranquilla, Colombia	Retained WBO lightweight title
11	Win	10–1	Ana Esteche	MD	10	2012-06-15	Coliseo Elias Chegwin, Barranquilla, Colombia	Retained WBO lightweight title
10	Win	9–1	Duda Yankovich	UD	10	2012-03-16	Coliseo Elias Chegwin, Barranquilla, Colombia	Won vacant WBO lightweight title
9	Loss	8–1	Fernanda Alegre	UD	10	2011-09-30	Ce.De.M. N° 2, Caseros, Argentina	For WBO light-welterweight title
8	Win	8–0	Rosaria Gonzalez	TKO	1 (6), 2:24	2011-06-04	Estadero Los Manguitos, Puerto Escondido, Colombia	
7	Win	7–0	Liliana Palmera	UD	8	2011-02-19	Estadero Los Abetos, Puerto Escondido, Colombia	
6	Win	6–0	Luz Darys Giraldo	TKO	2 (6), 1:07	2010-12-10	Coliseo Miguel Lora, Montería, Colombia	
5	Win	5–0	Rosaria Gonzalez	TKO	1 (4), 1:51	2010-10-15	Coliseo Miguel Lora, Montería, Colombia	
4	Win	4–0	Carmen Regino	KO	1 (4), 1:18	2010-09-19	Gimnasio Militar, Montería, Colombia	
3	Win	3–0	Rosalba Altamar	TKO	? (6), 2:30	2010-09-11	Estadero Los Abetos, Puerto Escondido, Colombia	
2	Win	2–0	Consuelo Paternina	KO	4 (4), 1:10	2010-05-22	Estadero El Planchon, Puerto Escondido, Colombia	
1	Win	1–0	Mariela Guerrero	TKO	3 (4), 1:10	2010-04-24	Estadero Los Abetos, Puerto Escondido, Colombia	

== See also ==
- List of female boxers

Sporting positions
World boxing titles
Vacant Title last held by Erin McGowan	WBO lightweight champion March 16, 2012 – June 14, 2013	Succeeded by María Maderna
