= Bray boxing club shooting =

2018 shooting in Ireland

Coordinates: 53.20842°N 6.10288°W

The Bray boxing club shooting happened in Bray, Ireland on 5 June 2018. Three men were shot, one of them being fatally injured. One of the survivors was Pete Taylor, father of Katie Taylor.

== Shooting ==
At 6:55 am a man walked into the Bray Boxing Club just before a class started and fired a number of shots, killing Bobby Messett, injuring Pete Taylor in the arm and chest and Ian Britton in the legs. There were 12 people in the gym including 1 minor at the time of the shooting. Katie Taylor had previously trained in the club, but was no longer involved and was in the United States at the time.

Pete Taylor and the other survivor of the shooting were taken to St. Vincent's University Hospital after being shot.

Gardaí were looking for a silver coloured Volkswagen Caddy after examining CCTV. The van was thought to have travelled from Bray through Shankill, then abandoned on Pigeon House Road near Poolbeg Generating Station in Ringsend.

== Arrests and charges ==
Gerard Cervi, of no fixed abode, was arrested and charged at a special sitting of Bray District Court in September 2018. The 31-year-old was originally from East Wall. A woman in her 20s was arrested in relation to the case, but released without charge.

Cervi was also charged with the attempted murders of Peter Taylor and Ian Britton in January 2019. He was sent for trial in February 2019. On 1 December 2023, Gerard Cervi was sentenced to life in prison after being found guilty on a single murder charge. No definitive motive was established.

== Aftermath ==
Pete Taylor spoke of his distress in the aftermath of the shooting both at the event and at the death of his close friend Bobby Messett, who had joined the gym in 2010. Pete's partner Karen Brown said on Instagram that she and Pete were relocating abroad after a "turbulent summer".

== Trials ==
=== First trial ===
On 28 June 2021 Gerard Cervi appeared at the Central Criminal Court. He spoke only to confirm his name and to plead not guilty to the charge of murdering Bobby Messett on 18 June 2018 and to the charges of attempting to murder Pete Taylor and Ian Britton on the same date. The trial was due to start on 29 June 2021 before Mr Justice Michael White.

The trial began on the afternoon of 29 June 2021. The prosecution stated that their case was that a single gunman had opened fire in the club and that the accused was said gunman. Furthermore, there were twelve people in the club and the three charges against him. Motive did not have to be decided.

In September the trial collapsed. The trial was originally due to end in August, but the finish date was extended to September and two jurors asked to be discharged. The remaining jurors agreed on 24 August to continue sitting until 22 October. On 2 September nine members of the jury arrived in court and Mr Justice White said he was "sorry to hear about the illness to one of your number". He said he hoped she would recover and adjourned the trial until 6 September. On 6 September he said that the ill juror had to go back into hospital and although her illness was not life-threatening it was impossible for the trial to continue as they had fewer than ten jurors. He thanked the nine for their jury service and discharged them. He listed the case for mention before the Central Criminal Court on 11 October 2021.

=== Retrial ===
In May 2023 the date of the retrial was set for 2 October 2023.

The trial began on 4 October 2023. Gerard Cervi pleaded not guilty. The state argued that fingerprint and DNA evidence taken from the van allegedly used by the gunman linked it to Gerard Cervi.

Pete Taylor gave evidence on 11 October 2023. He said that he had put on some music, heard loud bangs and thought an air compressor had blown up. He said that he saw Cervi standing in the door frame, with his feet apart, shooting. Taylor could not find anything to throw at the gunman, so ran towards him. He said he ran around machines, tripped over a bench and was shot in the shoulder as he was going over the bench.

==== Verdict ====
On 24 November 2023 Gerard Cervi was found guilty of the murder of Bobby Messett but was acquitted of attempting to murder Pete Taylor or Ian Britton.

==== Sentence ====
On 1 December 2023 Gerard Cervi was sentenced to life imprisonment for the murder of Bobby Messett.
