= Jasmine Clarkson =

American female boxer (1995–2024)

Personal information
- Nationality: American
- Born: Jasmine Samantha Clarkson; March 16, 1995 South Haven, Michigan, U.S.
- Died: May 14, 2024 (aged 29) Lancaster, Texas, U.S.
- Height: 5 ft 5 in (165 cm)
- Weight: Super featherweight, Lightweight
- Parents: Samuel Clarkson (father); Sandra Clarkson (mother)

Boxing career
- Stance: Orthodox

Boxing record
- Total fights: 18
- Wins: 4
- Losses: 14

Jasmine Samantha Clarkson (March 16, 1995 – May 14, 2024) was an American professional boxer.

== Biography ==
Jasmine Clarkson was born March 16, 1995 in South Haven, Michigan to parents Samuel and Sandra Clarkson.

She pursued a career as a boxer and despite having no amateur experience turned pro in 2014 at the age of 19. Her debut fight was against Amber Smith, with Clarkson winning by split decision. 7 months later she would also secure a win over Lisa Marie Lozano.

On July 29, 2017 she would face Olympic gold medalist and future three-time undisputed champion Katie Taylor, unfortunately she would be stopped in the third round.

Jasmine died on May 14, 2024, two months after her 29th birthday.

== Professional boxing record ==
18 fights	4 wins	14 losses
By knockout	0	2
By decision	4	12

No.	Result	Record	Opponent	Type	Round, time	Date	Location	Notes
18	Loss	4–14	Brittany Ordonez	UD	4	11 Dec 2021	San Antonio, Texas, U.S.	
17	Loss	4–13	Tiara Brown	RTD	4 (6)	22 Sep 2018	Maryland, U.S.	
16	Loss	4–12	Elvina White	UD	4	8 Aug 2018	Hollywood, California, U.S.	
15	Loss	4–11	Ebony Jones	UD	4	2 Feb 2018	Laurel, Mississippi, U.S.	
14	Loss	4–10	Selina Barrios	UD	4	9 Sep 2017	San Antonio, Texas, U.S.	
13	Loss	4–9	Katie Taylor	RTD	3 (8)	29 Jul 2017	Barclays Center, Brooklyn, New York, U.S.	
12	Loss	4–8	Kimberly Connor	UD	6	8 Jul 2017	Baton Rouge, Louisiana, U.S.	
11	Win	4–7	Lisa Marie Lozano	UD	4	28 Jan 2017	Austin, Texas, U.S.	
10	Win	3–7	Ebony Jones	UD	4	11 Oct 2016	Meridian, Mississippi, U.S.	
9	Loss	2–7	Lucia Osegueda	MD	4	26 Aug 2016	Humble Civic Center Arena, Humble, Texas, U.S.	
8	Loss	2–6	Natasha Spence	UD	8	7 May 2016	Madison, Wisconsin, U.S.	
7	Loss	2–5	Lucia Osegueda	UD	4	31 Oct 2015	Houston, Texas, U.S.	
6	Loss	2–4	Mayra Hernandez	MD	5	14 Aug 2015	Tulsa, Oklahoma, U.S.	
5	Loss	2–3	Jennifer Salinas	UD	8	20 Jun 2015	Maryland, U.S.	
4	Win	2–2	Lisa Marie Lozano	MD	4	25 Apr 2015	Mesquite, Texas, U.S.	
3	Loss	1–2	Angelica Rascon	SD	6	28 Mar 2015	El Paso, Texas, U.S.	
2	Loss	1–1	Kirstie Simmons	UD	4	28 Feb 2015	Denver, Colorado, U.S.	
1	Win	1–0	Amber Smith	SD	4	20 Sep 2014	Fort Worth, Texas, U.S.	

== Bare-knuckle boxing record ==
1 fight	0 wins	1 loss
By knockout	0	1
By decision	0	0

No.	Result	Record	Opponent	Type	Round, time	Date	Location	Notes
1	Loss	0–1	Christina Marks	TKO	2 (5)	9 Nov 2018	Casper Events Center, Wyoming, U.S.	
