= Mary McGee (boxer) =

American boxer (born 1986)

Personal information
- Nickname: Merciless
- Nationality: American
- Born: September 25, 1986 (age 40) Gary, Indiana, U.S.
- Height: 5 ft 6 in (168 cm)
- Weight: Lightweight; Light welterweight; Welterweight

Boxing career
- Reach: 72 in (183 cm)
- Stance: Orthodox

Boxing record
- Total fights: 34
- Wins: 28
- Win by KO: 16
- Losses: 5
- No contests: 1

Mary Ann McGee (born September 25, 1986) is an American professional boxer. She held the IBF female light welterweight title from 2019 to October 2021 and challenged for the WBC female lightweight title in 2013.

== Professional career ==
McGee made her professional debut on May 20, 2005, scoring a four-round unanimous decision (UD) victory over Jasmine Davis at the Radisson Hotel at Star Plaza Theatre in Merrillville, Indiana.

After compiling a record of 7–0, she faced undefeated Rita Figueroa (9–0, 3 KOs). The fight was stopped and ruled a no contest (NC) in the fourth round of a scheduled eight-round bout after an accidental clash of heads. McGee won her next four fights before facing Tawnyah Freeman for the vacant NABC female lightweight title on October 19, 2007, at the Adam's Mark Hotel in Indianapolis, Indiana. McGee won the fight via fifth-round technical knockout (TKO). After bouncing back with four wins, McGee fought Kristy Follmar (16–1, 9 KOs) for the vacant WBC International female lightweight title. The bout took place on April 25, 2009, at the Civic Center in Hammond, Indiana, with McGee capturing the WBC International female title via majority decision (MD) over ten rounds. Two judges scored the bout 97–93 in favour of McGee while the third scored it a draw at 95–95. She suffered her first career defeat in her next fight by UD over six rounds to Brooke Dierdorff on February 26, 2010.

McGee won her next three fights before unsuccessfully challenging Holly Holm for the IBA, and WBF light welterweight titles on May 12, 2013, at the Route 66 Casino in Albuquerque, New Mexico. She suffered the second defeat of her career, losing by UD over ten rounds. All three judges scored the bout 100–90 in favour of Holms.

In her next fight she challenged for her first major world title against the reigning, undefeated WBC female lightweight champion Érica Farías. McGee lost the bout by unanimous decision, with the judges' scorecards reading 100–90, 98–90 and 98–91.

She won her next five fights before challenging for her second major world title against Ana Laura Esteche on December 5, 2019, at Terminal 5 in New York City. McGee won via TKO in the tenth and final round to capture the vacant IBF female light welterweight title.

McGee lost her title to unbeaten WBC champion Chantelle Cameron at The O2 Arena in London, England, on October 30, 2021, going down to a unanimous decision defeat in a contest which was also for the inaugural Ring female light-welterweight title.

== Professional boxing record ==
34 fights	28 wins	5 losses
By knockout	16	0
By decision	12	5
No contests	1	

No.	Result	Record	Opponent	Type	Round, time	Date	Location	Notes
34	Loss	28–5 (1)	(Canada) Natasha Spence	MD	8	Oct 9, 2025	(United States) Mayflower Hotel, Washington D.C., U.S.	
33	Win	28–4 (1)	(Dominican Republic) Dahianna Santana	RTD	4 (6)	Jan 14, 2023	(United States) Good City Brewing, Milwaukee, U.S.	
32	Loss	27–4 (1)	(United Kingdom) Chantelle Cameron	UD	10	Oct 30, 2021	(United Kingdom) The O2 Arena, London, England	Lost IBF female light welterweight title; For WBC and inaugural The Ring female light welterweight titles
31	Win	27–3 (1)	(Australia) Deanha Hobbs	TKO	9 (10), 1:55	Feb 8, 2020	(United States) Civic Center, Hammond, Indiana, U.S.	Retained IBF female light welterweight title
30	Win	26–3 (1)	(Argentina) Ana Laura Esteche	TKO	10 (10), 0:30	Dec 5, 2019	(United States) Terminal 5, New York City, New York, U.S.	Won vacant IBF female light welterweight title
29	Win	25–3 (1)	(Hungary) Szilvia Szabados	UD	6	Apr 6, 2019	(United States) McBride Hall, Gary, Indiana, U.S.	
28	Win	24–3 (1)	(United States) Latasha Burton	KO	3 (4), 0:19	Oct 13, 2018	(United States) McBride Hall, Gary, Indiana, U.S.	
27	Win	23–3 (1)	(United States) Ebony Teague	TKO	2 (6), 0:13	Aug 26, 2016	(United States) House of Champions Fitness Center, Indianapolis, Indiana, U.S.	
26	Win	22–3 (1)	(United States) Davrene Morrison	UD	4	Oct 17, 2015	(United States) Civic Center, Hammond, Indiana, U.S.	
25	Win	21–3 (1)	(United States) Lakeysha Williams	UD	6	Nov 22, 2013	(United States) Star Plaza Theater, Merrillville, Indiana, U.S.	
24	Loss	20–3 (1)	(Argentina) Érica Farías	UD	10	Oct 4, 2013	Club Sportivo America, Rosario, Argentina	For WBC female lightweight title
23	Loss	20–2 (1)	(United States) Holly Holm	UD	10	May 11, 2013	(United States) Route 66 Casino, Albuquerque, New Mexico, U.S.	For IBA and WBF female light welterweight titles
22	Win	20–1 (1)	(United States) Victoria Cisneros	TKO	4 (6), 0:23	Dec 7, 2012	(United States) Route 66 Casino, Albuquerque, New Mexico, U.S.	
21	Win	19–1 (1)	(United States) Ashleigh Curry	UD	6	Sep 8, 2012	(United States) Civic Center, Hammond, Indiana, U.S.	
20	Win	18–1 (1)	(United States) Ashleigh Curry	UD	6	Jul 30, 2011	(United States) U.S. Steel Yard, Gary, Indiana, U.S.	
19	Loss	17–1 (1)	(United States) Brooke Dierdorff	UD	6	Feb 26, 2010	(United States) Civic Center, Hammond, Indiana, U.S.	
18	Win	17–0 (1)	(United States) Kristy Follmar	MD	10	Apr 25, 2009	(United States) Civic Center, Hammond, Indiana, U.S.	Retained NABC female lightweight title; Won vacant WBC International female lightweight title
17	Win	16–0 (1)	(United States) Jessica Mohs	TKO	3 (6), 0:01	Jan 23, 2009	(United States) Radisson Hotel at Star Plaza, Merrillville, Indiana, U.S.	
16	Win	15–0 (1)	(United States) Tonya Gallegos	TKO	2 (8), 1:52	Aug 2, 2008	(United States) U.S. Steel Yard, Gary, Indiana, U.S.	
15	Win	14–0 (1)	(United States) Renee Richardt	TKO	1 (6), 1:22	Apr 19, 2008	(United States) The Majestic Star Casino, Gary, Indiana, U.S.	
14	Win	13–0 (1)	(United States) Leora Jackson	UD	6	Dec 14, 2007	(United States) The Majestic Star Casino, Gary, Indiana, U.S.	
13	Win	12–0 (1)	(United States) Tawnyah Freeman	TKO	5 (10), 1:12	Oct 19, 2007	(United States) Adam's Mark Hotel, Indianapolis, Indiana, U.S.	Won NABC female lightweight title
12	Win	11–0 (1)	(United States) Willicia Moorehead	TKO	1 (6), 1:33	Sep 21, 2007	(United States) Radisson Hotel at Star Plaza, Merrillville, Indiana, U.S.	
11	Win	10–0 (1)	(Mexico) Eva Lidia Silva	UD	4	Jun 8, 2007	(United States) Hudson and Campbell Fitness Center, Gary, Indiana, U.S.	
10	Win	9–0 (1)	(United States) Christina Jones	KO	2 (6), 1:07	Apr 20, 2007	(United States) Star Plaza Hotel, Merrillville, Indiana, U.S.	
9	Win	8–0 (1)	(United States) Kim Colbert	UD	4	Feb 9, 2007	(United States) Star Plaza Theatre, Merrillville, Indiana, U.S.	
8	NC	7–0 (1)	(United States) Rita Figueroa	NC	4 (8), 0:41	Nov 17, 2006	(United States) Radisson Hotel at Star Plaza, Merrillville, Indiana, U.S.	Fight stooped after accidental clash of heads
7	Win	7–0	(United States) Leora Jackson	MD	6	May 26, 2006	(United States) Resorts Casino, East Chicago, Indiana, U.S.	
6	Win	6–0	(United States) KeLah Pollari	TKO	1 (4), 0:57	Apr 14, 2006	(United States) Radisson Hotel at Star Plaza, Merrillville, Indiana, U.S.	
5	Win	5–0	(United States) Susan Winner	UD	4	Feb 24, 2006	(United States) Civic Center, Hammond, Indiana, U.S.	
4	Win	4–0	(United States) Brandy Pope	TKO	1 (4), 1:53	Oct 21, 2005	(United States) Caesars Casino, Elizabeth, Indiana, U.S.	
3	Win	3–0	(United States) Brandi Davis	KO	1 (4), 0:51	Sep 30, 2005	(United States) Radisson Hotel at Star Plaza, Merrillville, Indiana, U.S.	
2	Win	2–0	(United States) Willicia Moorehead	TKO	3 (4), 1:37	Jul 8, 2005	(United States) Radisson Hotel at Star Plaza, Merrillville, Indiana, U.S.	
1	Win	1–0	(United States) Jasmine Davis	UD	4	May 20, 2005	(United States) Radisson Hotel at Star Plaza, Merrillville, Indiana, U.S.	
