= Adela Celeste Peralta =

Argentine boxer (born 1987)

Personal information
- Nickname: La Bestia ("The Beast")
- Born: Adela Celeste del Carmen Peralta; 18 July 1987 (age 39) Buenos Aires, Argentina
- Weight: Light welterweight

Boxing career
- Stance: Orthodox

Boxing record
- Total fights: 10
- Wins: 8
- Win by KO: 1
- Losses: 2
Medal record
Women's Amateur boxing
Representing Argentina
Pan American Games
Bronze medal – third place	Guadalajara 2011	light welterweight

Adela Celeste del Carmen Peralta (born 18 July 1987) is an Argentine former professional boxer.

== Professional career ==
Peralta turned professional in 2012 and compiled a record of 7–0 before facing & defeating Marisa Gabriela Nunez, to win the IBF & WBO light-welterweight titles. She would attempt to add the WBA title in 2016 by facing Ana Laura Esteche, she would lose via unanimous decision. Peralta would face Esteche in a rematch seven months later, she would once again lose via unanimous decision in what turned out to be her final fight as a professional.

== Professional boxing record ==
10 fights	8 wins	2 losses
By knockout	1	0
By decision	7	2

No.	Result	Record	Opponent	Type	Round, time	Date	Location	Notes
10	Loss	9–1	Ana Esteche	SD	10	2017-06-03	Estadio F.A.B., Buenos Aires, Argentina	For WBA, IBF and WBO light-welterweight titles
9	Loss	8–1	Ana Esteche	UD	10	2016-11-04	Estadio F.A.B., Buenos Aires, Argentina	Lost IBF and WBO light-welterweight titles; For WBA light-welterweight title
8	Win	8–0	Marisa Gabriela Núñez	UD	10	2016-05-14	Polideportivo Municipal, Rauch, Argentina	Won IBF and vacant WBO light-welterweight titles
7	Win	7–0	Ana Esteche	MD	8	2015-07-25	GAP Disco, Mar del Plata, Argentina	
6	Win	6–0	Cristina Beatriz Cuevas	SD	4	2014-10-25	Club Atlético Talleres, Villa Gobernador Gálvez, Argentina	
5	Win	5–0	Maria Angelica Ruiz	UD	6	2014-04-26	Polideportivo Carlos Magalot, Río Grande, Argentina	
4	Win	4–0	Maria Angelica Ruiz	UD	6	2014-01-18	Club Social de Pesca Nautica Y Fomento, San Clemente del Tuyú, Argentina	
3	Win	3–0	Cristina Beatriz Cuevas	UD	4	2013-12-06	Club Los Padres Capuchinos, Concordia, Argentina	
2	Win	2–0	Jeniffer Faccio	TKO	5 (6), 1:08	2013-02-16	Club Colon, Montevideo, Uruguay	
1	Win	1–0	Katia Alvarino	UD	4	2012-10-20	Estadio Luna Park, Buenos Aires, Argentina	

== See also ==
- List of female boxers

Sporting positions
World boxing titles
Preceded by Marisa Gabriela Núñez	IBF light-welterweight champion 14 May 2016 – 4 November 2016	Succeeded by Ana Esteche
Vacant Title last held by Fernanda Alegre	WBO light-welterweight champion 14 May 2016 – 4 November 2016	Succeeded by Ana Esteche
