= Mónica Acosta =

Argentine boxer (born 1978)

Personal information
- Nickname: La Gata ("The Cat")
- Born: Mónica Silvina Acosta; 22 February 1978 (age 48) Santa Rosa, La Pampa, Argentina
- Weight: Light welterweight

Boxing career
- Stance: Orthodox

Boxing record
- Total fights: 23
- Wins: 19
- Win by KO: 5
- Losses: 2
- Draws: 2

Mónica Silvina Acosta (born 22 February 1978), is an Argentine former professional boxer. She is a former WBC and WBA female light-welterweight champion.

== Professional career ==
Ivanova turned professional in 2007 & compiled a record of 8–0–2 before defeating Darys Esther Pardo, to win the vacant WBC light-welterweight title. She defended the WBC title seven times before vacating it in 2013.

She retired from the sport in 2014 .

== Professional boxing record ==
| 23 fights | 19 wins | 2 losses |
|---|---|---|
| By knockout | 5 | 0 |
| By decision | 14 | 2 |
| Draws | 2 | |

| No. | Result | Record | Opponent | Type | Round, time | Date | Location | Notes |
|---|---|---|---|---|---|---|---|---|
| 23 | Loss | 19–2–2 | Marisa Gabriela Nunez | MD | 10 (10) | 2014-09-12 | Estadio Deportistas Alvearenses, General Alvear, Argentina | For vacant IBF light-welterweight title |
| 22 | Loss | 19–1–2 | Ana Laura Esteche | UD | 10 (10) | 2014-01-18 | Club Social de Pesca, San Clemente del Tuyú, Argentina | Lost WBA light-welterweight title |
| 21 | Win | 19–0–2 | Belinda Laracuente | RTD | 6 (10) | 2013-08-09 | Club Estudiantes, Santa Rosa, Argentina | Retained WBA light-welterweight title |
| 20 | Win | 18–0–2 | Darys Esther Pardo | RTD | 4 (10) | 2013-05-03 | Gimnasio Municipal, Esquel, Argentina | Retained WBA light-welterweight title |
| 19 | Win | 17–0–2 | Dayana Cordero | TKO | 5 (10) | 2012-05-11 | Orfeo Superdomo, Córdoba, Argentina | Retained WBA and WBC light-welterweight titles |
| 18 | Win | 16–0–2 | Michelle Larissa Bonassoli | UD | 10 (10) | 2012-03-09 | Polideportivo Municipal, General Conesa, Argentina | Retained WBA and WBC light-welterweight titles |
| 17 | Win | 15–0–2 | Erin McGowan | MD | 10 (10) | 2011-09-09 | Club Estudiantes, Santa Rosa, Argentina | Retained WBA and WBC light-welterweight titles |
| 16 | Win | 14–0–2 | Alejandra Oliveras | UD | 10 (10) | 2011-02-18 | Club Estudiantes, Santa Rosa, Argentina | Retained WBC light-welterweight title; Won vacant WBA light-welterweight title |
| 15 | Win | 13–0–2 | Lely Luz Florez | SD | 10 (10) | 2010-09-10 | Santa Rosa, Argentina | Retained WBC light-welterweight title |
| 14 | Win | 12–0–2 | Diana Ayala | UD | 10 (10) | 2010-06-05 | Pico Football Club, General Pico, Argentina | Retained WBC light-welterweight title |
| 13 | Win | 11–0–2 | Verena Crespo | TKO | 4 (8) | 2009-12-11 | Toay, Argentina | |
| 12 | Win | 10–0–2 | Nicole Woods | UD | 10 (10) | 2009-10-23 | Club Estudiantes, Santa Rosa, Argentina | Retained WBC light-welterweight title |
| 11 | Win | 9–0–2 | Darys Esther Pardo | UD | 10 (10) | 2009-06-19 | Club Sportivo Eclipse, General Villegas, Argentina | Won vacant WBC light-welterweight title |
| 10 | Win | 8–0–2 | Paola Portillo | UD | 4 (4) | 2009-04-17 | Treinta de Agosto, Argentina | |
| 9 | Win | 7–0–2 | Silvia Beatriz Lescano | KO | 1 (10) | 2008-12-07 | Club Cochicó, Victorica, Argentina | |
| 8 | Win | 6–0–2 | Griselda Soledad Moreno | UD | 6 (6) | 2008-11-08 | Tres Lomas, Argentina | |
| 7 | Win | 5–0–2 | Anabel Amarillo | UD | 8 (8) | 2008-09-05 | Santa Rosa, Argentina | |
| 6 | Draw | 4–0–2 | Griselda Soledad Moreno | PTS | 4 (4) | 2008-08-22 | Club El Ciclon, Rosario, Argentina | |
| 5 | Win | 4–0–1 | Anabel Amarillo | UD | 6 (6) | 2008-08-08 | Club Manuel J. Campos, General Acha, Argentina | |
| 4 | Win | 3–0–1 | Guillermina Fernandez | UD | 4 (4) | 2008-07-05 | Club Cochicó, Victorica, Argentina | |
| 3 | Win | 2–0–1 | Anabel Amarillo | UD | 4 (4) | 2008-06-06 | Club Deportivo Argentino, Treinta de Agosto, Argentina | |
| 2 | Draw | 1–0–1 | Guillermina Fernandez | PTS | 4 (4) | 2007-10-19 | Club Atletico Costa Brava, General Pico, Argentina | |
| 1 | Win | 1–0 | Etel Cristina Arano | UD | 4 (4) | 2007-09-15 | Club Rivadavia, Arata, Argentina | |

== See also ==
- List of female boxers

Sporting positions
World boxing titles
| Vacant Title last held by Anne Sophie Mathis | WBC light-welterweight champion June 19, 2009 – 2013; Vacated | Vacant Title next held by Alejandra Oliveras |
| Vacant Title last held by Anne Sophie Mathis | WBA light-welterweight champion February 18, 2011 – January 18, 2014 | Succeeded by Ana Laura Esteche |
