= Belgrano de San Nicolás =

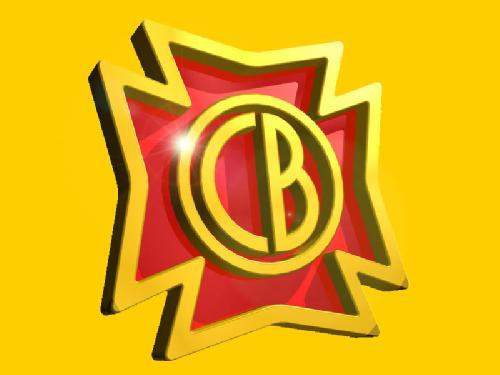
Logo

Club Belgrano de San Nicolás is a professional basketball team in San Nicolás de los Arroyos, Argentina playing in the Liga Nacional de Básquetbol (LNB). Their home arena is Fortunato Bonelli Arena.
