= Fernanda Alegre =

Argentine boxer (born 1987)

Personal information
- Nicknames: La Camionera ("The Trucker")
- Born: Fernanda Soledad Alegre; February 25, 1987 (age 39) Ramos Mejía, Argentina
- Height: 5 ft 5 1/2 in (166 cm)
- Weight: Light welterweight

Boxing career
- Stance: Orthodox

Boxing record
- Total fights: 25
- Wins: 22
- Win by KO: 11
- Losses: 2
- Draws: 1

Fernanda Soledad Alegre (born February 25, 1987) is an Argentine former professional boxer.

== Professional career ==
Alegre turned professional in 2009 & compiled a record of 7–1–1 before facing and defeating Michelle Larissa Bonassoli for the inaugural WBO light-welterweight title. She would defend the title eleven times including against Darys Esther Pardo and Dalia Vasarhelyi.

== Professional boxing record ==
25 fights	22 wins	2 losses
By knockout	11	0
By decision	11	2
Draws	1	

No.	Result	Record	Opponent	Type	Round, time	Date	Location	Notes
25	Win	22–2–1	Lely Luz Florez	UD	10	2015-09-11	Club Atlético Independiente, Avellaneda, Argentina	Retained WBO light-welterweight title
24	Win	21–2–1	Enis Pacheco	TKO	8 (10)	2015-04-25	Club Union y Progreso, Tandil, Argentina	Won vacant WBO light-welterweight title
23	Loss	20–2–1	Ana Esteche	SD	10	2014-11-29	Club Atlético Social y Deportivo Camioneros, Buenos Aires, Argentina	
22	Win	20–1–1	Dalia Vasarhelyi	TKO	2 (10)	2014-07-25	Club Atlético Social y Deportivo Camioneros, Buenos Aires, Argentina	Retained WBO light-welterweight title
21	Win	19–1–1	Roxana Beatriz Laborde	UD	8	2014-06-19	Club Atlético Social y Deportivo Camioneros, Buenos Aires, Argentina	
20	Win	18–1–1	Marisol Reyes	TKO	6 (10)	2014-02-21	Club Atlético Huracán, Necochea, Argentina	Retained WBO light-welterweight title
19	Win	17–1–1	Darys Esther Pardo	TKO	5 (10), 0:45	2013-12-14	Polideportivo Municipal, Monte Hermoso, Argentina	Retained WBO light-welterweight title
18	Win	16–1–1	Maria Angelica Ruiz	UD	8	2013-10-25	12 de Octubre, Isidro Casanova, Argentina	
17	Win	15–1–1	Diana Ayala	RTD	4 (10), 0:01	2012-11-30	Foro Polanco, Polanco, Mexico	Retained WBO light-welterweight title
16	Win	14–1–1	Darys Esther Pardo	RTD	7 (10), 0:01	2012-09-08	Centro Recreativo Pasteleros, Luis Guillón, Argentina	Retained WBO light-welterweight title
15	Win	13–1–1	Chris Namús	UD	10	2012-04-07	Club Atlético y Social Villa Calzada, Rafael Calzada, Argentina	Retained WBO light-welterweight title
14	Win	12–1–1	Chris Namús	UD	10	2011-12-17	Parque Municipal Eva Perón, Lomas de Zamora, Argentina	Retained WBO light-welterweight title
13	Win	11–1–1	Enis Pacheco	UD	10	2011-09-30	Ce.De.M. N° 2, Caseros, Argentina	Retained WBO light-welterweight title
12	Win	10–1–1	Silvana Lima da Silva	UD	10	2011-06-24	Ce.De.M. N° 2, Caseros, Argentina	Retained WBO light-welterweight title
11	Win	9–1–1	Diana Ayala	RTD	6 (10), 0:01	2011-03-11	Ce.De.M. N° 2, Caseros, Argentina	Retained WBO light-welterweight title
10	Win	8–1–1	Michelle Larissa Bonassoli	UD	10	2010-12-03	Parque Municipal Eva Perón, Lomas de Zamora, Argentina	Won inaugural WBO light-welterweight title
9	Draw	7–1–1	Juliana De Aguiar	SD	6	2010-10-23	Escuela Técnica Nº 1, Salto, Argentina	
8	Win	7–1	Roxana Beatriz Laborde	UD	10	2010-07-23	Parque Municipal Eva Perón, Lomas de Zamora, Argentina	Won vacant Argentine light-welterweight title
7	Win	6–1	Victorina Britez	TKO	1 (6), 1:28	2010-05-22	Casino City Center, Rosario, Uruguay	
6	Win	5–1	Paola Veronica Munoz	UD	6	2010-04-17	Casino City Center, Rosario, Uruguay	
5	Win	4–1	Jeniffer Faccio	RTD	3 (6), 0:47	2010-03-06	Club Union y Progreso, Tandil, Argentina	
4	Win	3–1	Eliana Elizabeth Gamboa	RTD	2 (4), 0:59	2010-01-23	Club Atlético Once Unidos, Mar del Plata, Argentina	
3	Win	2–1	Etel Cristina Arano	TKO	3 (4), 1:06	2009-11-13	Club Atlético Huracán, Buenos Aires, Argentina	
2	Loss	1–1	Eliana Maria Lencina	SD	4	2009-10-11	Estadio F.A.B., Buenos Aires, Argentina	
1	Win	1–0	Monica Elizabeth Galeano	UD	4	2009-06-27	Estadio F.A.B., Buenos Aires, Argentina	

== See also ==
- List of female boxers

Sporting positions
Regional boxing titles
New title	Argentine light-welterweight champion July 23, 2010 – December 3, 2010; Won world title	Vacant Title next held by Yamila Belen Abellaneda
World boxing titles
Inaugural champion	WBO light-welterweight champion December 3, 2010 – 2015; Stripped	Vacant Title next held by Herself
Vacant Title last held by Herself	WBO light-welterweight champion April 25, 2015 – 2016; Retired	Vacant Title next held by Adela Celeste Peralta
