= Nancy Franco =

Mexican boxer (born 1989)

Personal information
- Nickname: Chatita
- Born: Nancy Yesenia Franco de Alba; 17 February 1989 (age 37) Guadalajara, Jalisco, Mexico
- Height: 5 ft 1 in (155 cm)
- Weight: Minimumweight

Boxing career
- Reach: 59 in (150 cm)
- Stance: Orthodox

Boxing record
- Wins: 19
- Win by KO: 5
- Losses: 23
- Draws: 2
- No contests: 1

Nancy Franco (born 17 February 1989) is a Mexican professional boxer. She is a two-time IBF female minimumweight champion.

== Career ==
Franco began her professional boxing career with a third-round knockout win over Araneli Luna on 29 November 2008.

She won the vacant IBF female minimumweight title by defeating Kayoko Ebata on a unanimous decision at Korakuen Hall in Tokyo, Japan, on 28 November 2013.

Franco lost the title in her first defense against Victoria Argueta in Monterrey, Mexico, on 10 May 2014, but regained the belt in a rematch in Epazoyucan, Mexico, on 21 February 2015.

She challenged WBC female minimumweight champion Yuko Kuroki in Fukuoka, Japan, on 20 December 2015, but lost by unanimous decision.

Franco challenged WBA female minimumweight champion Anabel Ortiz in Tlalpan, Mexico, on 29 July 2017. She again lost on a unanimous decision.
