= Kimberly Connor =

American boxer and mixed martial arts fighter (born 1980)

- Born: October 31, 1980 (age 45); Waskom, Texas, U.S.
- Nickname: Killer
- Height: 5 ft 6 in (168 cm)
- Weight: Bantamweight (MMA); Super featherweight; Lightweight
- Reach: 69 in (175 cm)
- Style: Orthodox
- Years active: 2004–2018 (boxing); 2009–2010 (MMA)

Professional boxing record
- Total: 19
- Wins: 13
- By knockout: 5
- Losses: 4
- By knockout: 2
- Draws: 2

Mixed martial arts record
- Total: 4
- Wins: 4
- By knockout: 3
- By decision: 1
- Losses: 0

Other information
- Boxing record from BoxRec
- Mixed martial arts record from Sherdog

Kimberly Ann Connor (born October 31, 1980), or Connor-Hamby, is an American former professional boxer and mixed martial artist. In boxing, she challenged three times for world titles. Connor lost by second round stoppage to Amanda Serrano for the vacant IBF female super-featherweight title in 2011. Defending champion Victoria Bustos defeated her via unanimous decision for the IBF female lightweight title in 2017. Unified IBF and WBA female lightweight title holder Katie Taylor beat Connor by third round technical knockout in 2018.

== Professional boxing record ==
19 fights	13 wins	4 losses
By knockout	5	2
By decision	8	2
Draws	2	

No.	Result	Record	Opponent	Type	Round, time	Date	Location	Notes
19	Loss	13–4–2	(Republic of Ireland) Katie Taylor	TKO	3 (10), 1:43	28 Jul, 2018	(United Kingdom) The O2 Arena, London, England	For WBA and IBF female lightweight titles
18	Win	13–3–2	(United States) Jasmine Clarkson	UD	6	Jul 8, 2017	(United States) L'Auberge Casino & Hotel, Baton Rouge, Louisiana, U.S.	
17	Loss	12–3–2	(Argentina) Victoria Bustos	UD	10	Mar 18, 2017	Gimnasio Futbol Club, Vera, Argentina	For IBF female lightweight title
16	Win	12–2–2	(United States) Kim Colbert	TKO	3 (4), 1:57	May 7, 2016	(United States) Forrest City, Arkansas, U.S.	
15	Win	11–2–2	(United States) Kim Colbert	UD	6	Apr 21, 2016	(United States) Mel Ott Recreation Center, Gretna, Louisiana, U.S.	
14	Win	10–2–2	(United States) Nicole Woods	UD	8	Aug 25, 2012	(United States) Fitzgeralds Casino and Hotel, Tunica, Mississippi, U.S.	
13	Loss	9–2–2	(Puerto Rico) Amanda Serrano	TKO	2 (10), 1:45	Sep 10, 2011	(United States) Aviator Sports and Events Center, New York City, New York, U.S.	For vacant IBF female super-featherweight title
12	Win	9–1–2	(United States) Lisa Noel Garland	TKO	3 (10), 1:10	Jun 24, 2011	(United States) Bishop Park Event Center, Bryant, Arkansas, U.S.	
11	Win	8–1–2	(United States) Kerri Hill	UD	6	Jan 29, 2011	(United States) Fitness Unlimited, Benton, Arkansas, U.S.	
10	Win	7–1–2	(United States) Nicole Woods	UD	8	Nov 6, 2010	(United States) Fitzgeralds Casino and Hotel, Tunica, Mississippi, U.S.	
9	Win	6–1–2	(United States) Lucretia Meacham	PTS	6	Jul 17, 2010	(United States) Jacksonville Community Center, Jacksonville, Arkansas, U.S.	
8	Draw	5–1–2	(United States) Nicole Woods	PTS	8	Jan 30, 2010	(United States) Fitzgeralds Casino and Hotel, Tunica, Mississippi, U.S.	
7	Win	5–1–1	(United States) Aylin Sozen	TKO	2 (4)	Dec 16, 2009	(United States) Shooters, Texarkana, Texas, U.S.	
6	Draw	4–1–1	(United States) Tiffany Junot	PTS	6	Aug 6, 2009	(United States) Hilton Americas Hotel, Houston, Texas, U.S.	
5	Win	4–1	(United States) Dora Baptiste	TKO	2 (4), 1:37	Jul 24, 2009	(United States) Hollywood Casino, Bay St. Louis, Mississippi, U.S.	
4	Win	3–1	(United States) Crystal Delgado	UD	4	Jun 4, 2009	(United States) Humble Civic Center Arena, Humble, Texas, U.S.	
3	Win	2–1	(United States) Cristy Nickel	UD	6	Jul 23, 2005	(United States) Fitzgeralds Casino and Hotel, Tunica, Mississippi, U.S.	
2	Win	1–1	(United States) Angela Williams	TKO	3 (4), 1:33	Oct 15, 2004	(United States) University Plaza Hotel, Springfield, Missouri, U.S.	
1	Loss	0–1	(United States) Rita Serrano	UD	4	Aug 27, 2004	(United States) Renaissance Worthington Hotel, Fort Worth, Texas, U.S.	

== Mixed martial arts record ==
Professional record breakdown
4 matches	4 wins	losses
By knockout	4	0
By decision	1	0

Result	Record	Opponent	Method	Event	Date	Round	Time	Location	Notes
Win	4–0	(United States) Jessica Hilger	Decision (split)	Arkansas Xtreme Challenge	Apr 17, 2010	3	5:00	Veterans Community Center, Cabot, Arkansas, U.S.	
Win	3–0	(United States) Lucretia Meacham	TKO (punches)	Arkansas Xtreme Challenge	Feb 13, 2010	2	2:40	Statehouse Convention Center, Little Rock, Arkansas, U.S.	
Win	2–0	(United States) Kayla Oudthone	TKO (punches)	Arkansas Xtreme Challenge	Sep 12, 2009	1	2:43	Riverfront Amphitheater, Little Rock, Arkansas, U.S.	
Win	1–0	Crystal Hamilton	TKO (punches)	Arkansas Xtreme Challenge	Jun 27, 2009	1	0:20	Riverfront Amphitheater, Little Rock, Arkansas, U.S.	
