= Alejandra Oliveras =

Argentine boxer (1978–2025)

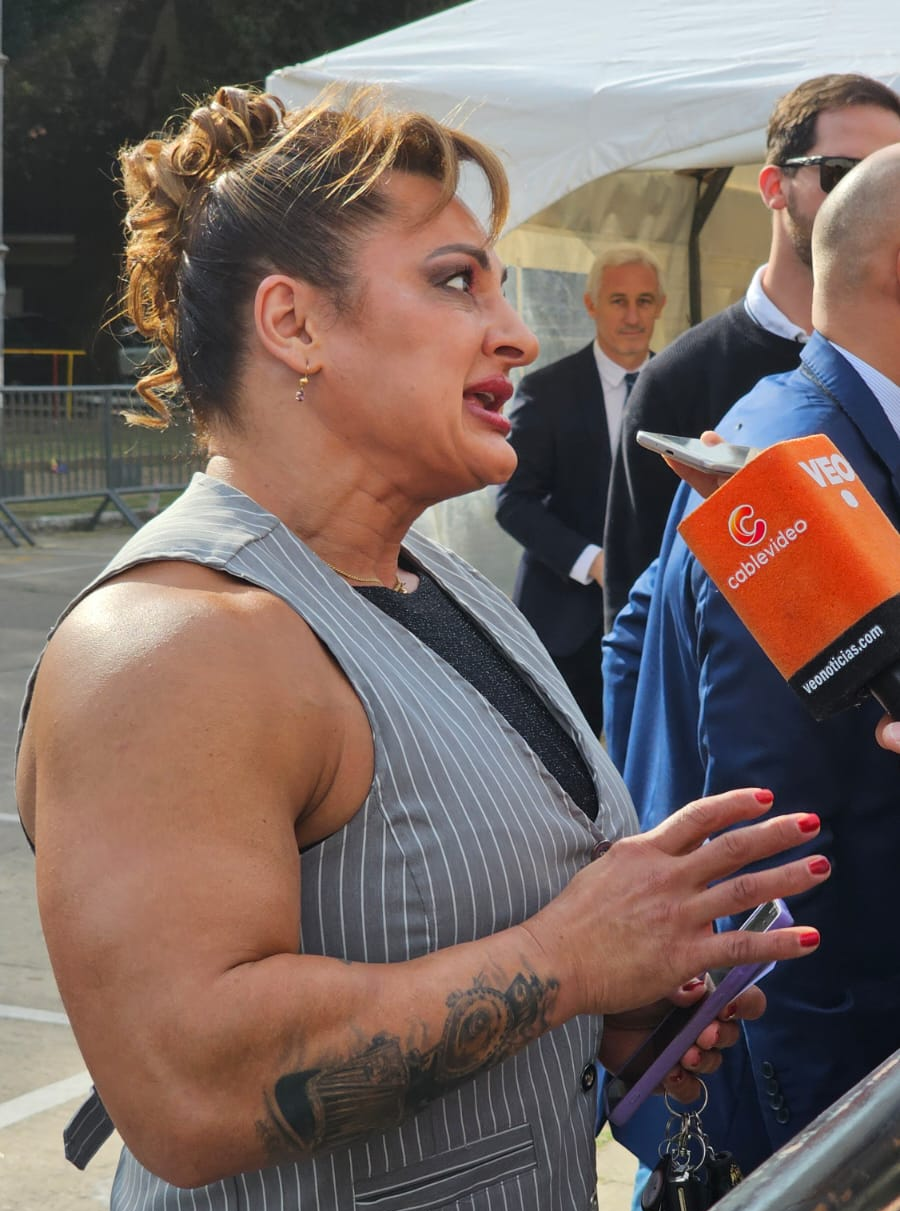
- Oliveras in 2025

Personal information
- Nickname: Locomotora ("Locomotive")
- Born: Alejandra Marina Oliveras; 20 March 1978 El Carmen, Jujuy, Argentina
- Died: 28 July 2025 (aged 47) Santa Fe, Santa Fe, Argentina
- Height: 5 ft 1 in (155 cm)
- Weight: Super-bantamweight; Featherweight; Lightweight; Light-welterweight

Boxing career
- Stance: Orthodox

Boxing record
- Total fights: 38
- Wins: 33
- Win by KO: 16
- Losses: 3
- Draws: 2

Alejandra Marina Oliveras (Spanish: [aleˈxandɾa maˈɾina oliˈβeɾas]; 20 March 1978 – 28 July 2025), known as "La Locomotora", was an Argentine professional boxer who competed from 2006 to 2015. She won world championships in four weight classes including the World Boxing Council (WBC) female super-bantamweight title from 2006 to 2008, the World Boxing Association (WBA) female lightweight title from 2011 to 2012, the World Boxing Organization (WBO) female featherweight title from 2012 to 2013, and WBC female super-lightweight title from 2013 to 2014.

Oliveras was also an activist for gender equality and promoted women's boxing. She was inducted into the Latin American Boxing Hall of Fame in 2024. Oliveras is also a member of the International Women's Boxing Hall of Fame.

== Biography ==
Oliveras was born on 20 March 1978 in El Carmen, Jujuy, Argentina, and was raised in Alejandro Roca, Juárez Celman Department, in a humble family. She was the fourth of seven siblings and after finishing primary school she began working as a farm labourer. A victim of gender violence since becoming a mother at the age of 14 until she separated from her husband, she took up boxing as a form of self-defense.

After holding several jobs, Oliveras began working at a local radio station reading the news. After reading a news story about Mike Tyson, a boxer she admired, she commented on live radio, saying, "I wish I could be a boxer". Soon, a former boxer who was in town called the radio station and asked about her. The following month, they organised a boxing festival with a girl from the town.

=== Professional boxing ===
Oliveras made her professional boxing debut on 12 August 2005 in General Levalle, Córdoba, with a knockout victory over María del Carmen Potenza. On 20 May 2006, she won her first international title by becoming the World Boxing Council (WBC) super bantamweight world champion against Jackie Nava in Mexico.

On 13 October of that year, she successfully defended her title in Rosario against Anays Gutiérrez Carrillo, "La Dama del Ring" (The Lady of the Ring), in a hard-fought bout. Oliveras suffered her first defeat on 4 December 2008, when Marcela ‘La Tigresa’ Acuña took her title on 4 December 2008 at Luna Park Stadium.

On 5 January 2012, Oliveras won against Jessica Villafranca by a knockout. The two were fighting for the vacant WBO featherweight world title.

On 19 April 2013, on her 5th defense of the featherweight title, Oliveras defeated Calixta Silgado in the fifth round by knockout. On 11 October 2013, she won the WBC Superkigero title against Lely Luz Flórez.

Oliveras lost her WBC light welterweight title on 15 November 2014, after being defeated by Erica Farias in a split decision. After this defeat, she ended her career with two victories, in 2015 and 2017. She finished with a record of 33 wins (16 KOs), 2 draws and 3 losses (no KOs), and her style was defined as aggressive and forceful when attacking.

She was inducted into the Latin American Boxing Hall of Fame in 2024. In October 2025, she was posthumously named among the inductees for the 2026 International Women's Boxing Hall of Fame class.

=== Community work ===
Oliveras stood out for her activism in favour of women's boxing and against gender inequality, especially in terms of remuneration in sport.

She founded Team Locomotora, a gym that offered free classes to low-income youth in Santó Tomé, Santa Fe, and participated in campaigns against gender violence. Oliveras also organised motivational talks for young people.

=== Political ===
Ahead of the 2021 legislative elections, Oliveras announced her intention to run for a seat in the lower house of Congress as part of the right-wing Unite Santa Fe party. With 3.91% of the votes, Oliveras's candidacy did not receive enough votes to get her elected. Oliveras supported Patricia Bullrich's presidential run in the 2023 general election. Following Bullrich's appointment as security minister in the government of Javier Milei, she appointed Oliveras to oversee the country's sports security agency.

In 2025, Oliveras ran for a seat in the Constitutional Convention tasked with writing a new constitution for Santa Fe Province. She won her seat with 78,471 votes, the sixth-most among all candidates in the province.

== Personal life and death ==
Oliveras had two sons, Alejandro and Alexis, both also gym instructors who worked with her.

On 14 July 2025, Oliveras suffered a stroke, leaving her hospitalized in Santa Fe, Argentina, in serious condition. That day, she was to be sworn in as a member of the Santa Fe Constitutional Convention, which was beginning its sessions. She died 14 days later from a pulmonary embolism on 28 July, at the age of 47.

== Professional boxing record ==
38 fights	33 wins	3 losses
By knockout	16	0
By decision	17	3
Draws	2	

No.	Result	Record	Opponent	Type	Round, time	Date	Location	Notes
38	Win	33–3–2	Lesly Morales	UD	10	8 Apr 2017	Gimnasio Municipal Enrique Mosconi, Cutral Có, Neuquén, Argentina	
37	Win	32–3–2	Natalia del Valle Aguirre	UD	6	17 Jul 2015	Club Racing, Teodolina, Santa Fe, Argentina	
36	Loss	31–3–2	Érica Farías	SD	10	15 Nov 2014	Plaza de Toros, Cancun, Quintana Roo, Mexico	Lost WBC super-lightweight title
35	Win	31–2–2	Lely Luz Florez	TKO	7 (10)	11 Oct 2013	Club Atletico Union, Santo Tome, Santa Fe, Argentina	Won vacant WBC super-lightweight title
34	Win	30–2–2	Calixta Silgado	KO	5 (10)	19 Apr 2013	Federación Jujeña de Básquetbol, San Salvador de Jujuy, Jujuy, Argentina	Retained WBO featherweight title
33	Win	29–2–2	Dayana Cordero	UD	10	23 Feb 2013	Club Olimpo, Bahia Blanca, Buenos Aires, Argentina	Retained WBO featherweight title
32	Win	28–2–2	Paulina Cardona	TKO	4 (10)	22 Dec 2012	Club Sportivo America, Rosario, Santa Fe, Argentina	Retained WBO featherweight title
31	Win	27–2–2	Migdalia Asprilla	TKO	5 (10)	14 Jul 2012	Salón Bomberos Voluntarios, General Villegas, Buenos Aires, Argentina	Retained WBO featherweight title
30	Win	26–2–2	Diana Ayala	RTD	6 (10)	9 Jun 2012	Estadio Pedro Estremador, San Carlos de Bariloche, Rio Negro, Argentina	Retained WBO featherweight title
29	Win	25–2–2	Simone Da Silva Duarte	KO	5 (8)	13 Apr 2012	Polideportivo Municipal, Necochea, Buenos Aires, Argentina	
28	Win	24–2–2	Jessica Villafranca	KO	5 (10)	5 Jan 2012	Gimnasio Santiago Saigós, San Antonio de Areco, Buenos Aires, Argentina	Won vacant WBO featherweight title
27	Win	23–2–2	Roxana Beatriz Laborde	UD	6	11 Nov 2011	Club Atletico Lanus, Lanus, Buenos Aires, Argentina	
26	Win	22–2–2	Liliana Palmera	RTD	5 (10)	12 Aug 2011	Asociación Deportiva Estudiantes, Rio Cuarto, Cordoba, Argentina	Won vacant WBA lightweight title
25	Win	21–2–2	Alicia Susana Alegre	TKO	6 (6)	13 May 2011	Club Estudiantes, Rio Cuarto, Cordoba, Argentina	
24	Win	20–2–2	Pamela Elizabeth Benavidez	UD	6	9 Apr 2011	Estadio Cubierto Municipal, Dean Funes, Cordoba, Argentina	
23	Loss	19–2–2	Mónica Acosta	UD	10	18 Feb 2011	Club Estudiantes, Santa Rosa, La Pampa, Argentina	For WBC and vacant WBA female super-lightweight titles
22	Win	19–1–2	Silvia Fernanda Zacarias	KO	5 (8)	12 Nov 2010	Club Atletico Union, Santa Fe, Santa Fe, Argentina	
21	Win	18–1–2	Sonia Edith Paladino	UD	8	24 Sep 2010	Salón Municipal, Villa del Dique, Cordoba, Argentina	
20	Win	17–1–2	Maria Eugenia Quiroga	UD	6	18 Jun 2010	Club Almirante Brown, San Isidro de Lules, Tucuman, Argentina	
19	Win	16–1–2	Antonina Ayala Vazquez	KO	2 (6)	10 Apr 2010	Ce.De.M. N° 2, Caseros, Buenos Aires, Argentina	
18	Win	15–1–2	Silvia Beatriz Lescano	TKO	1 (4)	30 Jan 2010	Club Social y Deportivo Peñarol, Guaminí, Buenos Aires, Argentina	
17	Win	14–1–2	Natalia del Pilar Burga	UD	10	6 Nov 2009	Asociación Mutual Club El Tala, San Francisco, Cordoba, Argentina	
16	Win	13–1–2	Adriana Salles	UD	10	16 May 2009	Palacio Peñarol, Montevideo, Uruguay	
15	Loss	12–1–2	Marcela Acuña	UD	10	4 Dec 2008	Estadio Luna Park, Distrito Federal, Argentina	Lost WBC super-bantamweight title; For WBA super-bantamweight title
14	Win	12–0–2	Michelle Larissa Bonassoli	RTD	5 (6)	7 Nov 2008	Polideportivo Corral de Palos, Cordoba, Cordoba, Argentina	
13	Win	11–0–2	Maria del Carmen Montiel	UD	8	11 Jul 2008	Club Defensores de Villa Lujan, San Miguel, Tucuman, Argentina	
12	Win	10–0–2	Adriana Salles	UD	10	4 Aug 2007	Club Atletico Central Argentino, Rio Cuarto, Cordoba, Argentina	Retained WBC super-bantamweight title
11	Draw	9–0–2	Jackie Nava	MD	10	2 Mar 2007	Super Domo Orfeo, Cordoba, Cordoba, Argentina	Retained WBC super-bantamweight title
10	Win	9–0–1	Claudia Andrea Lopez	SD	8	22 Dec 2006	Buenos Aires Lawn Tennis Club, Buenos Aires, Distrito Federal, Argentina	
9	Win	8–0–1	Anays Cecilia Gutierrez Carrillo	UD	10	13 Oct 2006	Club Sportivo America, Rosario, Santa Fe, Argentina	Retained WBC super-bantamweight title
8	Win	7–0–1	Jackie Nava	KO	8 (10)	20 May 2006	Palenque del Hipodromo, Tijuana, Baja California, Mexico	Won WBC super-bantamweight title
7	Win	6–0–1	Graciela Baez	TKO	1 (4)	7 Apr 2006	Club Pabellon, Alejandro, Cordoba, Argentina	
6	Draw	5–0–1	Betina Gabriela Garino	PTS	4	24 Mar 2006	La Carlota, Cordoba, Argentina	
5	Win	5–0	Betina Gabriela Garino	SD	4	17 Feb 2006	E.N.E.T. Nº 1, Laboulaye, Cordoba, Argentina	
4	Win	4–0	Maria del Carmen Potenza	TD	3 (4)	6 Jan 2006	Anfiteatro Municipal, Río Cuarto, Córdoba, Argentina	
3	Win	3–0	Silvia Raquel Gervasi	UD	4	11 Nov 2005	Hipólito Bouchard, Alejandro, Córdoba, Argentina	
2	Win	2–0	Maria del Carmen Montiel	UD	4	9 Sep 2005	La Carlota, Córdoba, Argentina	
1	Win	1–0	Maria del Carmen Potenza	TKO	2 (4)	12 Aug 2005	General Levalle, Córdoba, Argentina	

== See also ==
- List of female boxers
- List of boxing quadruple champions

Sporting positions
World boxing titles
Preceded by Jackie Nava	WBC super-bantamweight title 20 May 2006 – 4 December 2008	Succeeded by Marcela Acuña
Vacant Title last held by Layla McCarter	WBA lightweight champion 12 August 2011 – 2012; Vacated	Vacant Title next held by Cecilia Comunales
Vacant Title last held by Jeannine Garside	WBO featherweight champion 5 January 2012 – 2013; Vacated	Vacant Title next held by Amanda Serrano
Vacant Title last held by Mónica Acosta	WBC super-lightweight champion 11 October 2013 – 15 November 2014	Succeeded by Érica Farías
