= Pete Taylor (boxing coach) =

English-born Irish sportsperson

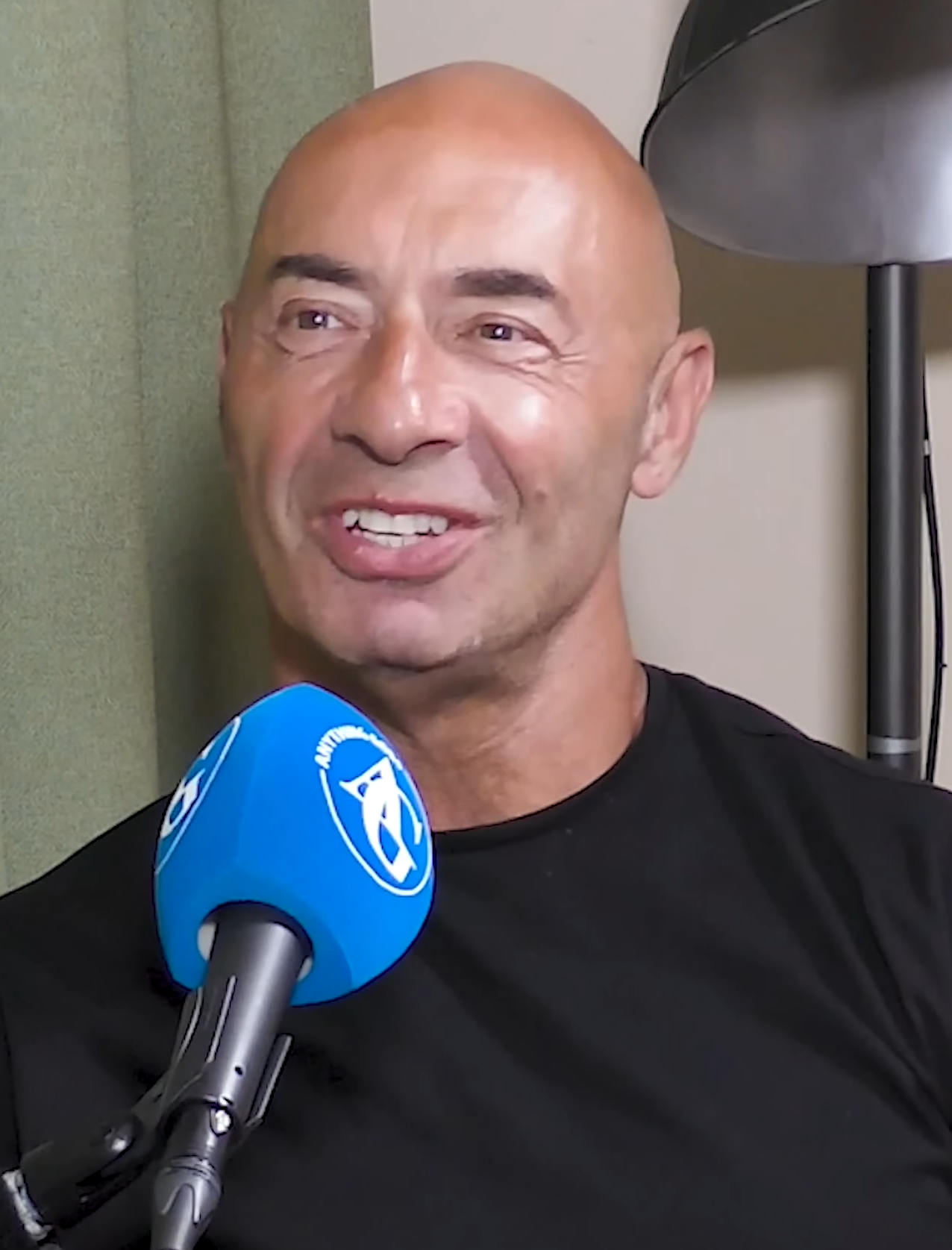
- Taylor in 2025

Personal information
- Nationality: (England) English
- Born: Leeds, England
- Occupation: Boxing coach
- Weight: Light heavyweight

Boxing career

Pete Taylor is a boxing coach, former boxer and trainer. He is the father of boxer Katie Taylor.

== Early life ==
Taylor is originally from Leeds, England, but he moved with his parents to Bray, County Wicklow to work in the amusement arcades in the town. He met Bridget Cranley in Bray; they married and had four children, Lee, Sarah, Peter and Katie. His son Peter, Katie’s brother, is a lecturer in mathematics.

== Boxing career ==
In 1986 he was a champion light heavyweight boxer in Ireland.

== Training ==
Taylor begain training Katie as a boxer in St Fergal's Boxing Club in Bray, and was in her corner when she won gold at the 2012 Olympics in London. He ceased training her before the 2016 Olympics, citing "personal reasons".

He also ran a cafe in Bray called "KO Fit Food".

=== Boxing club ===
Taylor founded a boxing club in Bray. The club was given €300,000 state funds in Katie's honour.

In 2017 he trained Seán Turner, David Oliver Joyce and Gary Cully, all signed to MTK Global. He has said that the boxers approached him individually and he has no connections to MTK himself.

==== Bray boxing club shooting ====
On 5 June 2018 Taylor survived being shot at his boxing club in Bray. Two other men were shot, one fatally.

Katie Taylor issued a statement issuing condolences to the family of Bobby Messet and relief that her father had survived. She mentioned that she was estranged from her father and nothing to do with the club since 2015. She also criticised the media for the use of her name and image in stories relating to the shooting and asked the media to leave her and her family alone.
