= Rose Volante =

Brazilian boxer (born 1982)

Personal information
- Nickname: The Queen
- Born: Rosilaine Volante Silva; 12 August 1982 (age 43) São Paulo, Brazil
- Height: 5 ft 5.5 in (166 cm)
- Weight: Lightweight

Boxing career
- Reach: 67.5 in (171 cm)
- Stance: Orthodox

Boxing record
- Total fights: 16
- Wins: 15
- Win by KO: 8
- Losses: 1

Rose Volante (born 12 August 1982) is a Brazilian professional boxer who held the WBO female lightweight title from 2017 to 2019.

== Professional career ==
Volante won the vacant WBO female lightweight title on 22 December 2017, with a majority decision win over Brenda Karen Carabajal. She retained the title against Lourdes Borbua and Yolis Marrugo Franco before losing it to IBF and WBA champion Katie Taylor in a unification bout on March 15, 2019.

== Professional boxing record ==
16 fights	15 wins	1 loss
By knockout	8	1
By decision	7	0

No.	Result	Record	Opponent	Type	Round, time	Date	Location	Notes
16	Win	15–1	(Brazil) Halanna Dos Santos	UD	8	4 Dec 2020	Arena de Lutas, São Paulo, Brazil	
15	Loss	14–1	(Republic of Ireland) Katie Taylor	TKO	9 (10), 1:40	15 Mar 2019	(United States) Liacouras Center, Philadelphia, Pennsylvania, U.S.	Lost WBO female lightweight title; For WBA and IBF female lightweight titles
14	Win	14–0	(Colombia) Yolis Marrugo Franco	TKO	3 (10), 0:51	29 Sep 2018	Ginásio Municipal Falcâo, Praia Grande, Brazil	Retained WBO female lightweight title
13	Win	13–0	(Panama) Lourdes Borbua	RTD	5 (10), 2:00	21 Apr 2018	Arena Santos, Santos, Brazil	Retained WBO female lightweight title
12	Win	12–0	(Argentina) Brenda Karen Carabajal	MD	10	22 Dec 2017	Federación Jujeña de Básquetbol, San Salvador de Jujuy, Argentina	Won vacant WBO female lightweight title
11	Win	11–0	(Brazil) Luana da Silva	TKO	2 (6), 1:34	1 Sep 2017	Ginasio Rebouças, Santos, Brazil	
10	Win	10–0	(Argentina) Yamila Belen Abellaneda	UD	10	6 May 2017	Ginasio Rebouças, Santos, Brazil	Retained WBC Latino female lightweight title
9	Win	9–0	(Argentina) Maria Carina Brito	UD	6	20 Jan 2017	Ginasio Rebouças, Santos, Brazil	
8	Win	8–0	(Brazil) Luana da Silva	UD	6	30 Sep 2016	Clube Internacional de Regatas, Santos, Brazil	
7	Win	7–0	(Brazil) Elaine Maria de Albuquerque	UD	10	9 Apr 2016	Academia Coliseo Boxe, Guarulhos, Brazil	Retained WBC Latino female lightweight title
6	Win	6–0	(Argentina) Maria Elena Maderna	KO	2 (10), 1:05	19 Sep 2015	Gym Prime, São Paulo, Brazil	Won vacant WBC Latino female lightweight title
5	Win	5–0	(Argentina) Maria Carina Brito	TKO	6 (10)	27 Apr 2015	Ginasio Municipal, Pacaembu, Brazil	Won vacant WIBA International lightweight title
4	Win	4–0	(Brazil) Valeria Rodrigues dos Santos	TKO	2 (10), 0:44	13 Dec 2014	Sede A.G.B., Guarulhos, Brazil	
3	Win	3–0	Unknown	KO	1 (6), 0:11	10 Oct 2014	Sede A.G.B., Guarulhos, Brazil	
2	Win	2–0	(Peru) Yelka Torres	UD	4	13 Sep 2014	Guarulhos, Brazil	
1	Win	1–0	(Brazil) Erika Karolina Araujo	KO	2 (4)	3 May 2014	Ginasio Rebouças, Santos, Brazil	

Sporting positions
World boxing titles
Vacant Title last held by Yohana Belen Alfonzo	WBO female lightweight champion 22 December 2017 – 15 March 2019	Succeeded by Katie Taylor
