= Estadio Fortunato Bonelli =

Indoor arena in San Nicolás de los Arroyos, Argentina

Coordinates: 33.3379°S 60.2214°W

The Estadio Fortunato Bonelli is an indoor arena in San Nicolás de los Arroyos, Argentina. It is primarily used for basketball and is the home arena of the Belgrano de San Nicolás. It holds 2,600 people.
