= Érica Farías =

Argentine boxer (born 1984)

Personal information
- Nickname: La Pantera
- Born: 13 July 1984 (age 42) Buenos Aires, Argentina
- Weight: Lightweight; Super-lightweight; Welterweight; Super-featherweight

Boxing career
- Stance: Orthodox

Boxing record
- Total fights: 35
- Wins: 27
- Win by KO: 10
- Losses: 8

Érica Farías
Medal record

Representing Argentina

Women's Boxing

World Amateur Boxing Championships
Silver medal – second place	2006 New Delhi	Lightweight

Érica Anabella Farías (born 13 July 1984), known as "La Pantera", is an Argentine former professional boxer. She is a two-weight world champion, having held the WBC female lightweight title from 2011 to 2014 and the WBC female super-lightweight title from 2014 to 2018. Farías also challenged for the undisputed female welterweight championship in 2017. As an amateur, she won a silver medal at the 2006 World Championships.

== Amateur career ==
Farias won the lightweight division at the 2006 Pan American Boxing Championships in Buenos Aires, Argentina. She also won a silver medal in the same weight division at the 2006 World Championships in New Delhi, India, losing to Katie Taylor of Ireland in the final.

== Professional career ==
Farías made her professional debut on 25 July 2009, at Estadio F.A.B. in Buenos Aires, Argentina, winning a four-round unanimous decision over Betiana Patricia Viñas. She won the WBC interim female lightweight title by knocking out Darys Esther Pardo in the eighth round at Polideportivo Troncos del Talar in Buenos Aires, Argentina, on 8 May 2010.

She became full WBC female lightweight champion when she defeated Ann Saccurato via unanimous technical decision at Estadio Socios Fundadores in Comodoro Rivadavia, Argentina, on 6 August 2011, after the fight was stopped in the eighth round due to an accidental clash of heads with Farías ahead on all of the three judges' scorecards. After eight successful defenses, Farías lost the title to Delfine Persoon by unanimous decision in Zwevezele, Belgium, on 20 April 2014.

Farias won her second world title, the WBC super-lightweight championship, on 15 November 2014, defeating Alejandra Oliveras by split decision at Plaza de Toros in Cancún, Mexico. On 2 May 2015, she made the first defense of her title against Klara Svensson. She won by unanimous decision.

On 9 June 2017, Farias challenged undisputed welterweight champion Cecilia Brækhus in Bergen, Norway, but lost by unanimous decision.

She lost her WBC super-lightweight title to Jessica McCaskill at the Wintrust Arena in Chicago, Illinois, United States, on 6 October 2018, by unanimous decision. A rematch took place at the same venue on 12 October 2019, with McCaskill again winning, this time via majority decision.

Farías challenged WBO female junior-lightweight champion Mikaela Mayer at Virgin Hotels Las Vegas in Paradise, Nevada, United States, on 19 June 2021, losing by unanimous decision.

On 12 March 2022, she defeated future two-weight world champion Sandy Ryan via split decision at Nottingham Arena in Nottingham, England. Farías lost a rematch against Ryan at Sheffield Arena in Sheffield, England, on 6 August 2022 by unanimous decision.

== Professional boxing record ==
35 fights	27 wins	8 losses
By knockout	10	1
By decision	17	7

No.	Result	Record	Opponent	Type	Round, time	Date	Location	Notes
35	Loss	27–8	(Mexico) Karla Ramos Zamora	TKO	5 (8)	3 Nov 2023	Aguascalientes, Mexico	
34	Loss	27–7	(Uruguay) Maira Moneo	UD	10	30 Dec 2022	Casino Buenos Aires, Buenos Aires, Argentina	
33	Loss	27–6	(United Kingdom) Sandy Ryan	UD	10	6 Aug 2022	(United Kingdom) Sheffield Arena, Sheffield, England	For vacant WBC International super lightweight title
32	Win	27–5	(United Kingdom) Sandy Ryan	SD	10	12 Mar 2022	(United Kingdom) Nottingham Arena, Nottingham, England	
31	Loss	26–5	(United States) Mikaela Mayer	UD	10	19 Jun 2021	(United States) Virgin Hotels Las Vegas, Paradise, Nevada, US	For WBO female junior lightweight title
30	Loss	26–4	(United States) Jessica McCaskill	MD	10	12 Oct 2019	(United States) Wintrust Arena, Chicago, Illinois, US	For WBA and WBC super lightweight titles
29	Loss	26–3	(United States) Jessica McCaskill	UD	10	6 Oct 2018	(United States) Wintrust Arena, Chicago, Illinois, US	Lost WBC female super lightweight title
28	Win	26–2	(Argentina) Yamila Esther Reynoso	UD	10	19 May 2018	Club Union, Goya, Argentina	Retained WBC female super lightweight title
27	Win	25–2	(Argentina) Ana Laura Esteche	UD	10	29 Dec 2017	Club Sportivo America, Rosario, Argentina	
26	Loss	24–2	(Norway) Cecilia Brækhus	UD	10	9 Jun 2017	Bergen, Norway	For WBA, WBC, IBF, WBO, and IBO female welterweight titles
25	Win	24–1	(Argentina) Marisa Gabriela Nunez	UD	10	19 Nov 2016	Ce.De.C Nº 1, San Fernando, Argentina	Retained WBC female super lightweight title
24	Win	23–1	(Argentina) Victoria Bustos	UD	10	30 Jul 2016	Club Sportivo America, Rosario, Argentina	Retained WBC female super lightweight title
23	Win	22–1	(Sweden) Klara Svensson	UD	10	2 May 2015	Frederiksberg-Hallerne, Frederiksberg, Denmark	Retained WBC female super lightweight title
22	Win	21–1	(Argentina) Alejandra Oliveras	SD	10	15 Nov 2014	Plaza de Toros, Cancún, Mexico	Won WBC female super lightweight title
21	Win	20–1	(Argentina) Roxana Beatriz Laborde	TKO	3 (6), 1:05	23 Aug 2014	Sociedad Alemana de Gimnasia de Villa Ballester, Jose Leon Suarez, Argentina	
20	Loss	19–1	(Belgium) Delfine Persoon	UD	10	20 Apr 2014	Zwevezele, Belgium	Lost WBC female lightweight title
19	Win	19–0	(Argentina) Maria Eugenia Lopez	UD	10	1 Mar 2014	Estadio F.A.B., Buenos Aires, Argentina	Retained WBC female lightweight title
18	Win	18–0	(United States) Mary McGee	UD	10	4 Oct 2013	Club Sportivo America, Rosario, Argentina	Retained WBC female lightweight title
17	Win	17–0	(Japan) Chika Mizutani	UD	10	15 Jun 2013	Centro Recreativo Pasteleros, Luis Guillón, Argentina	Retained WBC female lightweight title
16	Win	16–0	(Colombia) Liliana Palmera	KO	3 (10)	9 Mar 2013	Asociación de Fomento, San Bernardo, Argentina	Retained WBC female lightweight title
15	Win	15–0	(Argentina) Victoria Bustos	UD	10	17 Nov 2012	Parque Náutico, San Fernando de la Buena Vista, Argentina	Retained WBC female lightweight title
14	Win	14–0	(Bosnia and Herzegovina) Irma Balijagic Adler	TKO	1 (10), 1:34	16 Jun 2012	Estadio F.A.B., Buenos Aires, Argentina	Retained WBC female lightweight title
13	Win	13–0	(Colombia) Liliana Palmera	RTD	6 (10), 0:01	25 Feb 2012	Estadio Ingeniero Huergo, Comodoro Rivadavia, Argentina	Retained WBC female lightweight title
12	Win	12–0	(Puerto Rico) Melissa Hernandez	UD	10	16 Dec 2011	Arena Maipú Casino Resort, Mendoza, Argentina	Retained WBC female lightweight title
11	Win	11–0	(United States) Ann Saccurato	TD	8 (10), 1:00	6 Aug 2011	Estadio Socios Fundadores, Comodoro Rivadavia, Argentina	Retained WBC female lightweight title
10	Win	10–0	(Mexico) Jessica Villafranca	RTD	6 (10), 3:00	25 Feb 2011	Estadio Pedro Estremador, Bariloche, Argentina	Retained WBC interim female lightweight title
9	Win	9–0	(United States) Nicole Woods	TKO	2 (10), 1:40	17 Sep 2010	Ce.De.C Nº 1, San Fernando de la Buena Vista, Argentina	Retained WBC interim female lightweight title
8	Win	8–0	(Colombia) Darys Esther Pardo	KO	8 (10)	8 May 2010	Polideportivo Troncos del Talar, Buenos Aires, Argentina	Won WBC interim female lightweight title
7	Win	7–0	(Brazil) Vannessa Guimaraes	TKO	1 (10), 1:43	28 Nov 2009	Club Atletico Echagüe, Paraná, Argentina	
6	Win	6–0	(Argentina) Silvia Beatriz Lescano	KO	1 (8), 1:04	31 Oct 2009	Club Social y Deportivo Beccar, Buenos Aires, Argentina	
5	Win	5–0	(Argentina) Maria Eugenia Quiroga	UD	6	11 Oct 2009	Estadio F.A.B., Buenos Aires, Argentina	
4	Win	4–0	(Argentina) Maria Elena Maderna	UD	8	26 Sep 2009	Estadio F.A.B., Buenos Aires, Argentina	
3	Win	3–0	(Argentina) Paula Andrea Morales	UD	6	12 Sep 2009	Club Municipal, Nogoyá, Argentina	
2	Win	2–0	(Argentina) Marcela Fernanda Mamani	TKO	1 (4), 1:59	15 Aug 2009	Estadio F.A.B., Buenos Aires, Argentina	
1	Win	1–0	(Argentina) Betiana Patricia Vinas	UD	4	25 Jul 2009	Estadio F.A.B., Buenos Aires, Argentina	
