= Epazoyucan =

- Town and municipality
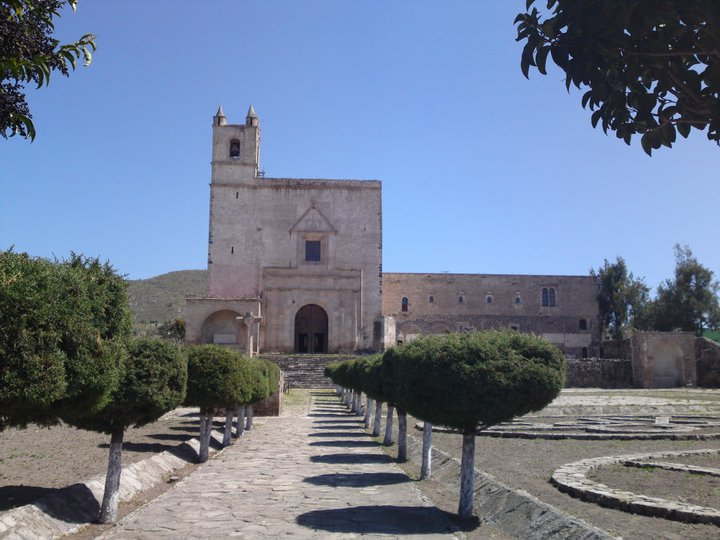
- Church of St Andrew the Apostle

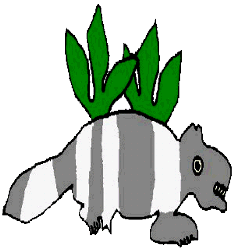
- Coat of arms

- Location within Hidalgo Location within Mexico
- Coordinates: 20°1′3.68″N 98°38′9.86″W
- Country: Mexico
- State: Hidalgo
- Municipality: Epazoyucan

Government
  - Federal electoral district: Hidalgo's 3rd

Area
  - Total: 174.7 km^{2} (67.5 sq mi)

Population (2005)
  - Total: 11,522
- Time zone: UTC-6 (Zona Centro)
- Website: epazoyucan.hidalgo.gob.mx

Epazoyucan is a town and one of the 84 municipalities of Hidalgo, in central-eastern Mexico. The municipality covers an area of 174.7 km^{2} (67.5 sq mi).

As of 2005, the municipality had a total population of 11,522.
