= List of IBF female world champions =

The following is a list of IBF female world champions certificated by the International Boxing Federation (IBF).

Stand: October 11, 2026.

Current champion
Most consecutive title defenses

^{r} – Champion relinquished title.
^{s} – Champion stripped of title.

== Junior mini flyweight ==
No.	Name	Duration of reign	Defences
1	(Costa Rica) Yokasta Valle	Dec 16, 2016 — 2017^{r}	0
2	(Japan) Saemi Hanagata	Sep 29, 2018 — 2022^{s}	2
3	(Japan) Ayaka Miyao	Feb 25, 2022 — Sep 1, 2022	0
4	(Japan) Mika Iwakawa	Sep 1, 2022 — Jan 12, 2024	0
5	(Japan) Sumire Yamanaka	Jan 12, 2024 — Apr 5, 2025	0
6	(Germany) Tina Rupprecht	Apr 5, 2025 — Oct 2025^{r}	0
7	(Japan) Sumire Yamanaka (2)	Apr 7, 2026 — Nov 21, 2026	0
8	(Spain) Isabel Rivero	Nov 21, 2026 — present	0

== Mini flyweight ==
No.	Name	Duration of reign	Defences
1	(Mexico) Katia Gutiérrez	Apr 16, 2011 — 2012^{s}	4
2	(Mexico) Nancy Franco	Nov 28, 2013 — May 10, 2014	0
3	(Mexico) Victoria Argueta	May 10, 2014 — Feb 21, 2015	1
4	(Mexico) Nancy Franco (2)	Feb 21, 2015 — 2015^{r}	0
5	(Japan) Etsuko Tada	Dec 11, 2015 — Jan 30, 2017	0
6	(China) Cai Zongju	Jan 30, 2017 — 2018^{r}	1
7	(Spain) Joana Pastrana	Jun 23, 2018 — Aug 4, 2019	2
8	(Costa Rica) Yokasta Valle	Aug 4, 2019 — Mar 29, 2024	9
9	(United States) Seniesa Estrada	Mar 29, 2024 — Oct 23, 2024^{r}	0
10	(Argentina) Sol Cudos	Apr 5, 2025 — Sep 27, 2025	0
11	(Canada) Kim Clavel	Sep 27, 2025 — present	0

== Junior flyweight ==
No.	Name	Duration of reign	Defences
1	(Mexico) Irma Sánchez	Jan 22, 2011 — Apr 16, 2011	0
2	(Mexico) Yessica Chávez	Apr 16, 2011 — 2012^{s}	3
3	(Japan) Naoko Shibata	Nov 14, 2013 — Mar 4, 2017	5
4	(Mexico) Alondra García	Mar 4, 2017 — 2018^{s}	0
5	(Mexico) Guadalupe Bautista	May 12, 2018 — Dec 29, 2018	0
6	(Argentina) Evelyn Nazarena Bermúdez	Dec 29, 2018 — Nov 26, 2022	3
7	(Costa Rica) Yokasta Valle	Nov 26, 2022 — 2023^{v}	0
8	(Argentina) Evelyn Nazarena Bermúdez (2)	Mar 10, 2023 — Jun 13, 2026	5
9	(Mexico) Estefany Alegria	Jun 13, 2026 — present	0

== Flyweight ==
No.	Name	Duration of reign	Defences
1	(Mexico) Arely Muciño	Jan 22, 2011 — Oct 29, 2011	3
2	(United States) Ava Knight	Oct 29, 2011 — 2013^{s}	2
3	(Uruguay) Gabriela Bouvier	Oct 25, 2013 — Dec 19, 2014	1
4	(Argentina) Leonela Paola Yúdica	Dec 19, 2014 — Oct 29, 2022	9
5	(Mexico) Arely Muciño (2)	Oct 29, 2022 — Oct 21, 2023	0
6	(United States) Gabriela Fundora	Oct 21, 2023 — present	6

== Junior bantamweight ==
No.	Name	Duration of reign	Defences
1	(Italy) Simona Galassi	Oct 28, 2011 — 2012^{s}	1
2	(Argentina) Débora Dionicius	Nov 24, 2012 — Sep 14, 2018	12
3	(Argentina) Jorgelina Guanini	Sep 14, 2018 — 2020^{s}	1
4	(Argentina) Micaela Luján	Jan 30, 2021 — 2023^{s}	2
5	(Mexico) Irma García	Nov 11, 2023 — present	3

== Bantamweight ==
No.	Name	Duration of reign	Defences
1	(Australia) Susie Ramadan	Feb 20, 2011 — 2011^{s}	0
2	(Mexico) Yazmín Rivas	Oct 15, 2011 — 2013^{s}	5
3	(Mexico) Janeth Pérez	Nov 30, 2013 — May 10, 2014	0
4	(Chile) Carolina Rodríguez	May 10, 2014 — 2017^{s}	3
5	(Argentina) Carolina Duer — Interim champion promoted	Apr 3, 2017 — Aug 4, 2017	0
6	(Argentina) María Cecilia Román	Aug 4, 2017 — Mar 26, 2022	6
7	(Australia) Ebanie Bridges	Mar 26, 2022 — Dec 12, 2023	1
8	(Japan) Miyo Yoshida	Dec 9, 2023 — Oct 23, 2024	0
9	(United States) Shurretta Metcalf	Oct 23, 2024 — Jul 11, 2025	1
10	(Australia) Cherneka Johnson	Jul 11, 2025 — present	1

== Junior featherweight ==
No.	Name	Duration of reign	Defences
1	(Puerto Rico) Ada Vélez	Mar 31, 2011 — Mar 24, 2012	1
2	(Dominican Republic) Katy Wilson Castillo	Mar 24, 2012 — 2014^{s}	2
3	(Mexico) Yulihan Luna	Nov 16, 2014 — 2016^{s}	1
4	(Argentina) Marcela Acuña	Dec 16, 2016 — Apr 13, 2018	1
5	(Argentina) Daniela Romina Bermúdez	Apr 13, 2018 — 2018^{s}	0
6	(Argentina) Marcela Acuña (2)	Aug 10, 2018 — 2020^{s}	2
7	(Argentina) Daniela Romina Bermúdez (2)	Dec 4, 2020 — 2022	0
7	(New Zealand) (Australia) Cherneka Johnson	Apr 20, 2022 — Jun 10, 2023	1
8	(United Kingdom) Ellie Scotney	Jun 10, 2023 — May 12, 2026^{r}	3

== Featherweight ==
No.	Name	Duration of reign	Defences
1	(United States) Stacey Reile	Mar 31, 2011 — Nov 20, 2011	0
2	(Dominican Republic) Dahianna Santana	Nov 20, 2011 — 2014^{r}	3
3	(United States) Jennifer Han	Sep 19, 2015 — Jul 20, 2020	4
4	(Denmark) Sarah Mahfoud — Interim champion promoted	Jul 20, 2020 — Sep 24, 2022	1
5	(Puerto Rico) Amanda Serrano	Sep 24, 2022 — 2024^{s}	3
6	(Germany) Nina Meinke	Sep 21, 2024 — present	1

== Junior lightweight ==
No.	Name	Duration of reign	Defences
1	(Puerto Rico) Amanda Serrano	Sep 10, 2011 — 2012^{r}	0
2	(Argentina) Claudia Andrea López	Oct 5, 2012 — 2013^{s}	0
3	(Argentina) Claudia Andrea López (2)	Aug 16, 2013 — 2014^{s}	1
4	(Argentina) Betiana Viñas	Dec 19, 2014 — 2016^{s}	0
5	(Argentina) Anahí Ester Sánchez	Mar 19, 2016 — 2016^{s}	1
6	(France) Maïva Hamadouche	Nov 10, 2016 — Nov 5, 2021	6
7	(United States) Mikaela Mayer	Nov 5, 2021 — Oct 15, 2022	1
8	(United States) Alycia Baumgardner	Oct 15, 2022 — present	3

== Lightweight ==
No.	Name	Duration of reign	Defences
1	(Belgium) Delfine Persoon	Sep 21, 2012 — 2013^{s}	0
2	(Argentina) Victoria Bustos	Sep 21, 2013 — Apr 28, 2018	5
3	(Republic of Ireland) Katie Taylor	Apr 28, 2018 — Jan 5, 2024^{v}	12
4	(Brazil) Beatriz Ferreira	Apr 27 2024 — Dec 6 2025	3
5	(Turkey) Elif Nur Turhan	Dec 6 2025 — Nov 8 2026	2
6	(United States) Alycia Baumgardner	Nov 8 2026 — Nov 7 2026	0

== Junior welterweight ==
No.	Name	Duration of reign	Defences
1	(France) Myriam Lamare	Nov 5, 2011 — 2012^{s}	0
2	(Argentina) Marisa Gabriela Núñez	Sep 12, 2014 — May 14, 2016	0
3	(Argentina) Adela Celeste Peralta	May 14, 2016 — Nov 4, 2016	0
4	(Argentina) Ana Esteche	Nov 4, 2016 — 2019^{s}	1
5	(Argentina) Victoria Bustos — Interim champion promoted	Jan 12, 2019 — 2019^{r}	0
6	(United States) Mary McGee	Dec 5, 2019 — Oct 30, 2021	1
7	(United Kingdom) Chantelle Cameron	Oct 30, 2021 — Nov 25, 2023	3
8	(Republic of Ireland) Katie Taylor	Nov 25, 2023 — Sep 11, 2026^{r}	3

== Welterweight ==
No.	Name	Duration of reign	Defences
1	(New Zealand) Daniella Smith	Nov 12, 2010 — Jun 11, 2011	0
2	(South Africa) Noni Tenge	Jun 11, 2011 — Jul, 2012^{s}	0
3	(Hungary) Eva Bajic	Mar 22, 2013 — 2014^{s}	0
4	(Croatia) Ivana Habazin	Mar 22, 2014 — Sep 13, 2014	0
5	(Norway) Cecilia Brækhus	Sep 13, 2014 — Aug 15, 2020	10
6	(United States) Jessica McCaskill	Aug 15, 2020 — Nov 5, 2022^{v}	3
7	(United Kingdom) Natasha Jonas	Jul 1, 2023 — Mar 7, 2025	2
8	(United Kingdom) Lauren Price	Mar 7, 2025 — present	0

== Junior middleweight ==
No.	Name	Duration of reign	Defences
1	(Germany) Jennifer Retzke	Apr 1, 2011 — 2011^{s}	0
2	(Argentina) Paola Gabriela Casalinuovo	Apr 12, 2014 — 2015^{s}	1
3	(Uruguay) Chris Namús	Aug 12, 2017 — Dec 1, 2018	1
4	(Canada) Marie-Eve Dicaire	Dec 1, 2018 — March 5, 2021	3
5	(United States) Claressa Shields	Mar 5, 2021 — Dec 3, 2021^{v}	0
6	(Canada) Marie-Eve Dicaire (2)	Dec 12, 2021 — Nov 12, 2022	0
7	(United Kingdom) Natasha Jonas	Nov 12, 2022 — 2023^{v}	0
8	(Belgium) Femke Hermans	Oct 11, 2023 — Nov 22, 2024	0
9	(United States) Oshae Jones	Nov 22, 2024 — present	1

== Middleweight ==
No.	Name	Duration of reign	Defences
1	(United States) Claressa Shields	Jun 22, 2018 — 2024^{r}	6
2	(Australia) Desley Robinson	Dec 13, 2024 — present	2

== Super middleweight ==
No.	Name	Duration of reign	Defences
1	(United States) Claressa Shields	Aug 4, 2017 — 2018^{s}	1
2	(Sweden) Elin Cederroos	Mar 22, 2019 — Apr 30, 2022	1
3	(United States) Franchón Crews-Dezurn	Apr 30, 2022 — Jul 1, 2023	0
4	(United Kingdom) Savannah Marshall	Jul 1, 2023 — Jul 11, 2025	1
5	(United States) Shadasia Green	Jul 11, 2025 — Apr 17, 2026	1
6	(New Zealand) Lani Daniels	Apr 17, 2026 — present	0

== Light heavyweight ==
No.	Name	Duration of reign	Defences
1	(New Zealand) Lani Daniels	Dec 2, 2023 — Dec 6, 2025	2
1	(Germany) Sarah Scheurich	Dec 6, 2025 — Present	0

== Heavyweight ==
No.	Name	Duration of reign	Defences
1	(New Zealand) Lani Daniels	May 27, 2023 — Dec 15, 2023^{v}	1
2	(United States) Claressa Shields	Feb 2, 2025 — present	2

== See also ==
- List of current female world boxing champions
- List of female undisputed world boxing champions
- List of WBA female world champions
- List of WBC female world champions
- List of WBO female world champions
- List of WIBO world champions
