= Victoria Bustos =

Argentine boxer (born 1989)

Personal information
- Nickname: La Leona
- Born: Victoria Noelia Bustos; 7 January 1989 (age 37) Rosario, Santa Fe, Argentina
- Weight: Lightweight; Light-welterweight; Welterweight; Super-featherweight

Boxing career
- Stance: Orthodox

Boxing record
- Total fights: 36
- Wins: 26
- Win by KO: 0
- Losses: 9
- Draws: 1

Victoria Noelia Bustos (born 7 January 1989) is an Argentine professional boxer. She is a two-weight world champion, having held the IBF female lightweight title from 2013 to 2018 and the IBF interim female light-welterweight title in 2018. Bustos also challenged for the undisputed female welterweight title in 2019.

== Professional career ==
Bustos won the vacant IBF female lightweight title on 21 September 2013, with a unanimous decision win over Ana Esteche at Club Sportivo America in Rosario, Argentina.

She successfully retained the title five times, before losing to WBA champion Katie Taylor by unanimous decision in a unification match at the Barclays Center in New York City, New York, USA, on 28 April 2018.

Bustos won the vacant IBF interim female light-welterweight title by defeating Enis Pacheco via unanimous decision at Estadio Municipal in Pérez, Argentina, on 1 December 2018.

She challenged undisputed female welterweight champion, Cecilia Brækhus, at Salle des Étoiles in Monte Carlo, Monaco, on 30 November 2019, losing by unanimous decision.

On 21 May 2022, Bustos faced WBC, IBF and The Ring female welterweight title holder Chantelle Cameron at The O2 Arena in London, England. She lost via unanimous decision.

== Professional boxing record ==
36 fights	26 wins	9 losses
By decision	26	9
Draws	1	

No.	Result	Record	Opponent	Type	Round, time	Date	Location	Notes
36	Loss	26–9–1	(France) Rima Ayadi	UD	10	16 Dec 2024	Salle du Casino, Enghien, France	For vacant IBF female super-featherweight title
35	Win	26–8–1	(Argentina) Lilian Dolores Silva	UD	6	18 May 2024	Club Deportivo Jorge Newbery, Galvez, Argentina	
34	Loss	25–8–1	(Argentina) Edith Soledad Matthysse	UD	10	13 Apr 2024	Club Deportivo Jorge Newbery, Galvez, Argentina	Lost FAB female super-featherweight title
33	Win	25–7–1	(Argentina) Estefania Karen Alaniz	UD	10	8 Sep 2023	Club Ciclista Juninense, Junín, Argentina	Won FAB female super-featherweight title
32	Draw	24–7–1	(Argentina) Estefania Karen Alaniz	SD	10	28 Apr 2023	Arena Complejo Deportivo Teniente Origone, Justiniano Posse, Argentina	For vacant FAB female super-featherweight title
31	Win	24–7	(Argentina) Estefania Karen Alaniz	UD	8	11 Feb 2023	Arena Villa Carlos Paz, Villa Carlos Paz, Argentina	
30	Loss	23–7	(United Kingdom) Chantelle Cameron	UD	10	21 May 2022	(United Kingdom) The O2 Arena, London, England	For WBC, IBF and The Ring female light-welterweight titles
29	Win	23–6	(Argentina) Erica Alvarez	MD	6	19 Mar 2022	Monaco Hotel & Resort, Villa Carlos Paz, Argentina	
28	Win	22–6	(Argentina) Yamila Reynoso	MD	8	30 Oct 2021	Club Prado Espanol, Villa Nueva, Argentina	
27	Win	21–6	(Argentina) Maria Capriolo	MD	6	12 Jun 2021	Complejo Multifuncion, Pérez, Argentina	
26	Win	20–6	(Argentina) Claudia Lopez	UD	8	18 Dec 2020	Asociacion Bomberos Voluntarios, Zavalla, Argentina	
25	Loss	19–6	(Norway) Cecilia Brækhus	UD	10	30 Nov 2019	Casino de Salle Medecin, Monte Carlo, Monaco	For WBA, WBC, IBF, WBO and IBO female welterweight titles
24	Win	19–5	(Colombia) Enis Pacheco	UD	10	1 Dec 2018	Estadio Municipal, Pérez, Argentina	Won vacant IBF female interim light-welterweight title
23	Loss	18–5	(Republic of Ireland) Katie Taylor	UD	10	28 Apr 2018	(United States) Barclays Center, New York City, New York, US	Lost IBF female lightweight title; For WBA female lightweight title
22	Win	18–4	(Argentina) Maria Capriolo	UD	10	18 Aug 2017	Club Sportivo America, Rosario, Argentina	Retained IBF female lightweight title
21	Win	17–4	(United States) Kimberly Connor	UD	10	18 Mar 2017	Gimnasio Futbol Club, Vera, Argentina	Retained IBF female lightweight title
20	Win	16–4	(Argentina) Cristina Cuevas	UD	6	23 Dec 2016	Club Atletico y Recreativo Ferrocarril, Vera, Argentina	
19	Loss	15–4	(Argentina) Erica Farias	UD	10	30 Jul 2016	Club Sportivo America, Rosario, Argentina	For WBC female light welterweight title
18	Win	15–3	(Argentina) Ruth Aquino	MD	10	16 Apr 2016	Club Atlético Talleres, Villa Constitución, Argentina	Won vacant IBF Inter-Continental female lightweight title
17	Win	14–3	(Argentina) Claudia Lopez	UD	10	22 Aug 2015	Club Sportivo America, Rosario, Argentina	Retained IBF female lightweight title
16	Win	13–3	(Argentina) Betiana Vinas	UD	8	3 Apr 2015	Club Sportivo America, Rosario, Argentina	
15	Win	12–3	(Argentina) Natalia Aguirre	UD	10	29 Aug 2014	Club Sportivo America, Rosario, Argentina	Retained IBF female lightweight title
14	Loss	11–3	(Argentina) Natalia Aguirre	UD	6	5 Apr 2014	Club Atlético Bernardino Rivadavia, Peyrano, Argentina	
13	Win	11–2	(Argentina) Roxana Laborde	UD	10	2 Nov 2013	Club Atlético Bernardino Rivadavia, Peyrano, Argentina	Retained IBF female lightweight title
12	Win	10–2	(Argentina) Ana Esteche	UD	10	21 Sep 2013	Club Sportivo America, Rosario, Argentina	Won FAB and vacant IBF female lightweight titles
11	Win	9–2	(Argentina) Yohana Alfonzo	UD	6	28 Jun 2013	Club Sportivo America, Rosario, Argentina	
10	Loss	8–2	(Argentina) Natalia Aguirre	SD	6	31 May 2013	Gimnasio Pedro Estremador, San Carlos de Bariloche, Argentina	
9	Win	8–1	(Argentina) Maria Ruiz	UD	6	11 Jan 2013	Club El Ciclon, Rosario, Argentina	
8	Win	7–1	(Argentina) Paula Morales	UD	6	22 Dec 2012	Club Sportivo America, Rosario, Argentina	
7	Loss	6–1	(Argentina) Erica Farias	UD	10	17 Nov 2012	Parque Náutico, San Fernando, Argentina	For WBC female lightweight title
6	Win	6–0	(Argentina) Silvia Zacarias	UD	8	3 Aug 2012	Club El Ciclon, Rosario, Argentina	
5	Win	5–0	(Argentina) Roxana Laborde	UD	6	15 Jun 2012	Club El Ciclon, Rosario, Argentina	
4	Win	4–0	(Argentina) Roxana Laborde	UD	4	20 Apr 2012	Centro Cosmopolita Unión y Progreso, Roldán, Argentina	
3	Win	3–0	(Argentina) Marisa Nunez	UD	4	2 Mar 2012	Club El Ciclon, Rosario, Argentina	
2	Win	2–0	(Argentina) Gabriela Ramos	UD	4	3 Dec 2011	Club Banco Nación, Rosario, Argentina	
1	Win	1–0	(Argentina) Maria Ruiz	UD	4	8 Jul 2011	Club Sportivo America, Rosario, Argentina	

Sporting positions
Regional boxing titles
New title	IBF Inter-Continental female lightweight champion 16 April 2016 – present	Incumbent
Preceded by Ana Esteche	FAB female lightweight champion 21 September 2013 – July 2014; Vacated	Vacant
World boxing titles
Vacant Title last held by Delfine Persoon	IBF female lightweight champion 21 September 2013 – 28 April 2018	Succeeded by Katie Taylor
