= List of current female world boxing champions =

Below is a list of current female world boxing champions recognised by the WBA, WBC, IBF, WBO, and The Ring.

Each champion's professional boxing record is shown in the following format: wins–losses–draws (no contests) (knockout wins).

== Heavyweight (+175 lb/+79.4 kg or +168 lb/+76.2 kg) ==
WBA	WBC	IBF	WBO	The Ring
Claressa Shields; 19–0 (4 KO); February 2, 2025	Claressa Shields; 19–0 (4 KO); July 27, 2024	Claressa Shields; 19–0 (4 KO); February 2, 2025	Claressa Shields; 19–0 (4 KO); February 2, 2025	

== Light heavyweight (175 lb/79.4 kg) ==
WBA	WBC	IBF	WBO	The Ring
vacant		Sarah Scheurich; 7–0 (4 KO); December 6, 2025	vacant	

== Super middleweight (168 lb/76.2 kg) ==
WBA	WBC	IBF	WBO	The Ring
Franchón Crews-Dezurn; 10–3 (1) (2 KO); March 25, 2024	Franchón Crews-Dezurn; 10–3 (1) (2 KO); December 15, 2023	Lani Daniels; 12–4–2 (2 KO); April 17, 2026	Lani Daniels; 12–4–2 (2 KO); April 17, 2026	Lani Daniels; 12–4–2 (2 KO); April 17, 2026

== Middleweight (160 lb/72.6 kg) ==
WBA	WBC	IBF	WBO	The Ring
Claressa Shields; 19–0 (4 KO); August 15, 2026	Claressa Shields; 19–0 (4 KO); August 15, 2026	Tammara Thibeault; 5–0 (3 KO); August 8, 2026	Tammara Thibeault; 5–0 (3 KO); August 8, 2026	Tammara Thibeault; 5–0 (3 KO); August 8, 2026

== Super welterweight/Junior middleweight (154 lb/69.9 kg) ==
WBA	WBC	IBF	WBO	The Ring
Chantelle Cameron; 23–1 (8 KO); August 29, 2026	Chantelle Cameron; 23–1 (8 KO); August 29, 2026	Oshae Jones; 9–0–1 (3 KO); November 22, 2024	Chantelle Cameron; 23–1 (8 KO); April 5, 2026	Chantelle Cameron; 23–1 (8 KO); August 29, 2026

== Welterweight (147 lb/66.7 kg) ==
WBA	WBC	IBF	WBO	The Ring
Lauren Price; 11–0 (2 KO); May 11, 2024	Lauren Price; 11–0 (2 KO); March 7, 2025	Lauren Price; 11–0 (2 KO); March 7, 2025	Lauren Price; 11–0 (2 KO); November 21, 2026	Lauren Price; 11–0 (2 KO); May 11, 2024

== Super lightweight/Junior welterweight (140 lb/63.5 kg) ==
WBA	WBC	IBF	WBO	The Ring
Katie Taylor; 26–1 (6 KO); November 25, 2023	Katie Taylor; 26–1 (6 KO); September 5, 2026	Katie Taylor; 26–1 (6 KO); November 25, 2023	Katie Taylor; 26–1 (6 KO); November 25, 2023	Katie Taylor; 26–1 (6 KO); November 25, 2023
Litzy Vasquez Ochoa; Interim champion 8–0 (6 KO); July 11, 2026	Katie Taylor; 26–1 (6 KO); September 5, 2026	Katie Taylor; 26–1 (6 KO); November 25, 2023	Katie Taylor; 26–1 (6 KO); November 25, 2023	Katie Taylor; 26–1 (6 KO); November 25, 2023

== Lightweight (135 lb/61.2 kg) ==
WBA	WBC	IBF	WBO	The Ring
Stephanie Han; 13–0 (3 KO); February 22, 2025	Caroline Dubois; 14–0–1 (5 KO); December 11, 2024	Alycia Baumgardner; 19–1 (7 KO); November 8, 2026	Caroline Dubois; 14–0–1 (5 KO); April 5, 2026	Caroline Dubois; 14–0–1 (5 KO); April 5, 2026
Estelle Mossely; Interim Champion; 14–0–1 (1KO); July 4, 2026	Caroline Dubois; 14–0–1 (5 KO); December 11, 2024	Alycia Baumgardner; 19–1 (7 KO); November 8, 2026	Caroline Dubois; 14–0–1 (5 KO); April 5, 2026	Caroline Dubois; 14–0–1 (5 KO); April 5, 2026

== Super featherweight/Junior lightweight (130 lb/59 kg) ==
WBA	WBC	IBF	WBO	The Ring
Alycia Baumgardner; 18–1 (1) (7 KO); February 4, 2023	Bernice Ferreira; 11–0 (4 KO); August 15, 2026	Alycia Baumgardner; 18–1 (1) (7 KO); October 15, 2022	Alycia Baumgardner; 18–1 (1) (7 KO); October 15, 2022	Alycia Baumgardner; 18–1 (1) (7 KO); October 15, 2022
Leila Beaudoin; Interim Champion; 15–2–0 (2KO); June 10, 2026	Bernice Ferreira; 11–0 (4 KO); August 15, 2026	Alycia Baumgardner; 18–1 (1) (7 KO); October 15, 2022	Alycia Baumgardner; 18–1 (1) (7 KO); October 15, 2022	Alycia Baumgardner; 18–1 (1) (7 KO); October 15, 2022

== Featherweight (126 lb/57.2 kg) ==
WBA	WBC	IBF	WBO	The Ring
Amanda Serrano; 49–4–1 (32 KO); February 4, 2023	Tiara Brown; 21–0 (11 KO); March 22, 2025	Nina Meinke; 21–3 (4 KO); September 21, 2024	Amanda Serrano; 49–4–1 (32 KO); September 13, 2019	Amanda Serrano; 49–4–1 (32 KO); September 24, 2022

== Super bantamweight/Junior featherweight (122 lb/55.3 kg) ==
WBA	WBC	IBF	WBO	The Ring
Melissa Mortensen; 10–0 (5 KO); August 21, 2026	Skye Nicolson; 16–1 (3 KO); May 29, 2026	Ramla Ali; 14–2 (3 KO); November 8, 2026	Ramla Ali; 14–2 (3 KO); November 8, 2026	vacant

== Bantamweight (118 lb/53.5 kg) ==
WBA	WBC	IBF	WBO	The Ring
Dina Thorslund; 25–0 (9 KO); August 8, 2026	Dina Thorslund; 25–0 (9 KO); August 8, 2026	Dina Thorslund; 25–0 (9 KO); August 8, 2026	Dina Thorslund; 25–0 (9 KO); August 8, 2026	Dina Thorslund; 25–0 (9 KO); August 8, 2026

== Super flyweight/Junior bantamweight (115 lb/52.2 kg) ==
WBA	WBC	IBF	WBO	The Ring
Nataly Delgado; 21–7–2 (5 KO); June 13, 2026	Adelaida Ruiz; 19–1–1 (8 KO); November 29, 2025	Irma García; 26–5–1 (6 KO); November 11, 2023	Mizuki Hiruta; 11–0 (2 KO); December 1, 2022	Mizuki Hiruta; 11–0 (2 KO); May 17, 2025
Nataly Delgado; 21–7–2 (5 KO); June 13, 2026	Diana Laura Fernandez; Interim Champion; 38–4–1(5 KO); September 19, 2026	Irma García; 26–5–1 (6 KO); November 11, 2023	Mizuki Hiruta; 11–0 (2 KO); December 1, 2022	Mizuki Hiruta; 11–0 (2 KO); May 17, 2025

== Flyweight (112 lb/50.8 kg) ==
WBA	WBC	IBF	WBO	The Ring
Gabriela Fundora; 19–0 (1) (10 KO); November 2, 2024	Gabriela Fundora; 19–0 (1) (10 KO); November 2, 2024	Gabriela Fundora; 19–0 (1) (10 KO); October 21, 2023	Gabriela Fundora; 19–0 (1) (10 KO); November 2, 2024	Gabriela Fundora; 19–0 (1) (10 KO); November 2, 2024
Linn Sandstrom; Interim Champion; 13–4–4 (2 KO); September 1, 2026	Gabriela Sanchez Saavedra; Interim champion 13–6 (1 KO); March 28, 2026	Gabriela Fundora; 19–0 (1) (10 KO); October 21, 2023	Gabriela Fundora; 19–0 (1) (10 KO); November 2, 2024	Gabriela Fundora; 19–0 (1) (10 KO); November 2, 2024

== Light flyweight/Junior flyweight (108 lb/49 kg) ==
WBA	WBC	IBF	WBO	The Ring
Estefany Alegria; 15–1 (4 KO); June 13, 2026	Lourdes Juárez; 40–4 (5 KO); November 29, 2024	Estefany Alegria; 15–1 (4 KO); June 13, 2026	Estefany Alegria; 15–1 (4 KO); June 13, 2026	vacant
Melisa Meraz; Interim champion 11–4–2 (2 KO); September 27, 2025	Lourdes Juárez; 40–4 (5 KO); November 29, 2024	Estefany Alegria; 15–1 (4 KO); June 13, 2026	Estefany Alegria; 15–1 (4 KO); June 13, 2026	vacant

== Minimumweight/Mini flyweight/Strawweight (105 lb/47.6 kg) ==
WBA	WBC	IBF	WBO	The Ring
Sarah Bormann; 21–1 (7 KO); October 18, 2025	Yokasta Valle; 34–4 (10 KO); November 1, 2024	Kim Clavel; 22–2 (3 KO); Sep 27, 2025	Sarah Bormann; 21–1 (7 KO); December 14, 2024	vacant
Sarah Bormann; 21–1 (7 KO); October 18, 2025	Yokasta Valle; 34–4 (10 KO); November 1, 2024	Yadira Bustillos; Interim champion 12–3 (2 KO); October 24, 2026	Sarah Bormann; 21–1 (7 KO); December 14, 2024	vacant

== Light minimumweight/Junior mini flyweight/Atomweight (102 lb/46.3 kg) ==
WBA	WBC	IBF	WBO	The Ring
Isabel Rivero; 13–3–1 (1 KO); November 21, 2025	Camila Zamorano; 15–0 (1 KO); October 15, 2025	Sumire Yamanaka; 10–1 (3 KO); April 7, 2026	Gabriela Timar; 16–2 (3 KO); December 26, 2025	vacant

== See also ==
- List of current world boxing champions
- List of WBA female world champions
- List of WBC female world champions
- List of IBF female world champions
- List of WBO female world champions
- Women Boxing Archive Network
