= List of female undisputed world boxing champions =

This is a list of female undisputed champions in professional boxing. Eras that are not listed means that it does not have any undisputed champions.

| Current undisputed champion |
| Most consecutive title defenses |

== Championship recognition ==
Titles have been awarded by:

- World Boxing Association (WBA), founded in 1921 as the National Boxing Association (NBA); renamed as the WBA in 1962
- World Boxing Council (WBC), founded in 1963
- International Boxing Federation (IBF), founded in 1983
- World Boxing Organization (WBO), founded in 1988
- International Boxing Organization (IBO), founded in 1992

== Criteria ==
- 2009–present, a boxer who holds the WBA, WBC, IBF, and WBO world titles simultaneously.

== Heavyweight ==
=== WBA–WBC–IBF–WBO era ===
| No. | Name | Date | Defenses |
|---|---|---|---|
| 1 | Claressa Shields (def. Danielle Perkins) | 2 February 2025 – present | 2 |

== Super middleweight ==
=== WBA–WBC era ===
| No. | Name | Date | Defenses |
|---|---|---|---|
| 1 | Natascha Ragosina (def. Akondaye Fountain) | 15 December 2007 – 2009 | 3 |
Ragosina's undisputed reign ended when she retired in 2009

=== WBA–WBC–IBF–WBO era ===
| No. | Name | Date | Defenses |
|---|---|---|---|
| 1 | Franchón Crews-Dezurn (def. Elin Cederroos) | 30 April 2022 – 1 July 2023 | 0 |
| 2 | Savannah Marshall (def. Franchón Crews-Dezurn) | 1 July 2023 – 15 December 2023 | 0 |

== Middleweight ==
=== WBA–WBC–IBF–WBO era ===
| No. | Name | Date | Defenses |
|---|---|---|---|
| 1 | Claressa Shields (def. Christina Hammer) | 13 April 2019 – 16 September 2020 | 0 |
Shields' undisputed ended when she vacated the WBO title. The title was vacated when a bout for the vacant title was announced on 16 September.
| 2 | Claressa Shields (2) (def. Savannah Marshall) | 15 October 2022 – December 13, 2024 | 1 |

== Super welterweight ==
=== WBA–WBC era ===
| No. | Name | Date | Defenses |
|---|---|---|---|
| 1 | Jisselle Salandy (def. Elizabeth Mooney) | 15 September 2006 – 4 January 2009 | 5 |
Salandy's undisputed reign ended when she died in a vehicular accident.

=== WBA–WBC–IBF–WBO era ===
| No. | Name | Date | Defenses |
|---|---|---|---|
| 1 | Claressa Shields (def. Marie-Éve Dicaire) | 5 March 2021 – 26 November 2021 | 0 |
Shields' undisputed status ended when she vacated the WBC title. The title was vacated when Patricia Berghult fought and won the vacant title.

== Welterweight ==
=== WBA–WBC era ===
| No. | Name | Date | Defenses |
|---|---|---|---|
| 1 | Holly Holm (def. Ann Saccurato) | 22 March 2007 – 2007 | 0 |
Holm's undisputed reign ended when she vacated the WBA title.

=== WBA–WBC–IBF–WBO era ===
| No. | Name | Date | Defenses |
|---|---|---|---|
| 1 | Cecilia Brækhus (def. Ivana Habazin) | 14 September 2014 – 15 August 2020 | 10 |
| 2 | Jessica McCaskill (def. Cecilia Brækhus) | 15 August 2020 – 2023 | 3 |
McCaskill's undisputed reign ended when she vacated the WBO title.
| 3 | Lauren Price (def. Michaela Kotaskova) | 20 November 2026 – present | 0 |

== Super lightweight ==
=== WBA–WBC–IBF–WBO era ===
| No. | Name | Date | Defenses |
|---|---|---|---|
| 1 | Chantelle Cameron (def. Jessica McCaskill) | 5 November 2022 – 25 November 2023 | 1 |
| 2 | Katie Taylor (def. Chantelle Cameron) | 25 November 2023 – 17 September 2025 | 2 |
Taylor’s undisputed reign ended when she vacated her WBC title.
| 3 | Katie Taylor (def. Flora Pili) | 5 September 2026 – 11 September 2026^{v} | 0 |

== Lightweight ==
=== WBA–WBC–IBF–WBO era ===
| No. | Name | Date | Defenses |
|---|---|---|---|
| 1 | Katie Taylor (def. Delfine Persoon) | 1 June 2019 – 2024 | 7 |
Taylor’s undisputed reign ended when she vacated the WBA, WBC, IBF & WBO titles after moving up and becoming undisputed at super lightweight.

== Super featherweight ==
=== WBA–WBC–IBF–WBO era ===
| No. | Name | Date | Defenses |
|---|---|---|---|
| 1 | Alycia Baumgardner (def. Elhem Mekhaled) | 4 February 2023 – September 2025 | 2 |
Baumgardner’s undisputed reign ended when she vacated the WBC title.

== Featherweight ==
=== WBA–WBC–IBF–WBO era ===
| No. | Name | Date | Defenses |
|---|---|---|---|
| 1 | Amanda Serrano (def. Erika Cruz) | 4 February 2023 – 5 December 2023 | 1 |

== Super bantamweight ==
=== WBA–WBC–IBF–WBO era ===
| No. | Name | Date | Defenses |
|---|---|---|---|
| 1 | Ellie Scotney (def. Mayelli Flores) | 5 April 2026 – 12 May 2026 | 0 |
Scotney's undisputed status ended when she vacated all her titles to move up to featherweight.

== Bantamweight ==
=== WBA–WBC era ===
| No. | Name | Date | Defenses |
|---|---|---|---|
| 1 | Anita Christensen (def. Nadya Hokmi) | 14 October 2006 – 21 June 2008 | 2 |
| 2 | Galina Ivanova (def. Anita Christensen) | 21 June 2008 – 2008 | 0 |
Ivanova's undisputed reign ended when she vacated the WBA title.

=== WBA–WBC–IBF–WBO era ===
| No. | Name | Date | Defenses |
|---|---|---|---|
| 1 | Cherneka Johnson (def. Shurretta Metcalf) | 11 July 2025 – 8 August 2026 | 2 |
| 2 | Dina Thorslund (def. Cherneka Johnson) | 8 August 2026 – present | 0 |

== Super flyweight ==
To date, there has never been an undisputed champion in this division.

== Flyweight ==
=== WBA–WBC–IBF–WBO era ===
| No. | Name | Date | Defenses |
|---|---|---|---|
| 1 | Gabriela Fundora (def. Gabriela Celeste Alaniz) | 2 Nov 2024 – present | 3 |

== Light flyweight ==
To date, there has never been an undisputed champion in this division.

== Mini flyweight ==
=== WBA–WBC–IBF–WBO era ===
| No. | Name | Date | Defenses |
|---|---|---|---|
| 1 | Seniesa Estrada (def. Yokasta Valle) | 29 March – 23 October 2024 | 0 |
Estrada retired from professional boxing in October 2024.

== Atomweight ==
=== WBA–WBC–IBF–WBO era ===
| No. | Name | Date | Defenses |
|---|---|---|---|
| 1 | Tina Rupprecht (def. Sumire Yamanaka) | 5 April 2025 – October 2025 | 0 |
Rupprecht retired from professional boxing in October 2025

== See also ==
- List of current world boxing champions
- List of current female world boxing champions
- List of WBA female world champions
- List of WBC female world champions
- List of IBF female world champions
- List of WBO female world champions
