= List of The Ring female world champions =

Boxing magazine The Ring has awarded world championships in men's professional boxing within each weight class from its foundation in 1922 until the 1990s, and again since 2001. In 2019 they began awarding world championships to women, however, the publication did not begin producing monthly female divisional rankings until August 2020.

Current champion
Most consecutive title defenses

^{r} – Champion relinquished title.
^{s} – Champion stripped of title.

== Super middleweight ==
No.	Name	Date 2	Defenses
1	(United States) Franchón Crews-Dezurn (def. Elin Cederroos)	April 30, 2022 – July 1, 2023	0
2	(United Kingdom) Savannah Marshall	July 1, 2023 – July 11, 2025	0
3	(United States) Shadasia Green	July 11, 2025 – April 17, 2026	0
4	(New Zealand) Lani Daniels	April 17, 2026 – present	0

== Middleweight ==
No.	Name	Date	Defenses
1	(United States) Claressa Shields (def. Christina Hammer)	April 13, 2019 – present	4

== Junior middleweight ==
No.	Name	Date	Defenses
1	(United States) Claressa Shields (def. Marie-Eve Dicaire)	March 5, 2021 – present	1

== Welterweight ==
No.	Name	Date	Defenses
1	(United States) Jessica McCaskill (def. Cecilia Brækhus)	March 13, 2021 – May 11, 2024	2
2	(Wales) Lauren Price	May 11, 2024 – present	3

== Junior welterweight ==
No.	Name	Date 2	Defenses
1	(United Kingdom) Chantelle Cameron (def. Mary McGee)	October 30, 2021 – November 25, 2023	3
2	(Republic of Ireland) Katie Taylor	November 25, 2023 – present	2

== Lightweight ==
No.	Name	Date	Defenses
1	(Republic of Ireland) Katie Taylor (def. Delfine Persoon)	June 1, 2019 – December 11, 2024^{r}	7
1	(England) Caroline Dubois (def. Terri Harper)	April 5, 2026 – present	0

== Junior lightweight ==
No.	Name	Date	Defenses
1	(United States) Mikaela Mayer (def. Maïva Hamadouche)	November 5, 2021 – October 15, 2022	1
2	(United States) Alycia Baumgardner	October 15, 2022 – present	5

== Featherweight ==
No.	Name	Date	Defenses
1	(Puerto Rico) Amanda Serrano (def. Sarah Mahfoud)	September 24, 2022 – present	4

== Junior featherweight ==
No.	Name	Date	Defenses
1	(United Kingdom) Ellie Scotney (def. Ségolène Lefebvre)	April 13, 2024 – May 12, 2026^{r}	3

== Bantamweight ==
No.	Name	Date 2	Defenses
1	(Denmark) Dina Thorslund (def. Yulihan Luna)	September 1, 2023 – June 6, 2025^{r}	4
2	(Australia) Cherneka Johnson (def. Shurretta Metcalf)	July 11, 2025 – present	1

== Junior Bantamweight ==
No.	Name	Date	Defenses
1	(Japan) Mizuki Hiruta (def. Carla Merino)	May 17, 2025 – present	2

== Flyweight ==
No.	Name	Date	Defenses
1	(United States) Marlen Esparza (def. Naoko Fujioka)	April 9, 2022 – April 27, 2024	2
2	(Argentina) Gabriela Celeste Alaniz (def. Marlen Esparza)	April 27, 2024 – November 2, 2024	0
3	(United States) Gabriela Fundora (def. Gabriela Celeste Alaniz)	November 2, 2024 – present	3

== Strawweight ==
No.	Name	Date	Defenses
1	(United States) Seniesa Estrada (def. Tina Rupprecht)	March 25, 2023 – October 2025^{r}	3

== Atomweight ==
No.	Name	Date	Defenses
1	(Germany) Tina Rupprecht (def. Eri Matsuda)	November 23, 2024 – Oct 2025^{r}	1

== See also ==
- List of current female world boxing champions
- List of WBA female world champions
- List of WBC female world champions
- List of WBO female world champions
- List of IBF female world champions
