= Naoko Fujioka =

Japanese boxer (born 1975)

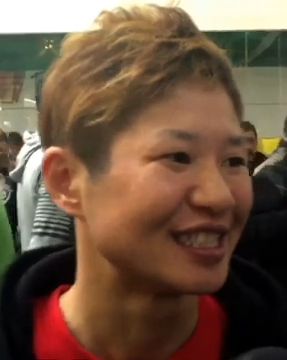
- Fujioka in 2015

Personal information
- Born: 藤岡奈穂子; 18 August 1975 (age 51) Ōsaki, Miyagi, Japan
- Height: 5 ft 2 in (157 cm)
- Weight: Mini-flyweight; Light-flyweight; Flyweight; Super-flyweight; Bantamweight

Boxing career
- Reach: 63 1/2 in (161 cm)
- Stance: Orthodox

Boxing record
- Total fights: 23
- Wins: 19
- Win by KO: 7
- Losses: 3
- Draws: 1

Naoko Fujioka (藤岡奈穂子, Fujioka Naoko; born 18 August 1975) is a Japanese former professional boxer. She is Japan's first ever five-division world champion, having held the WBA female flyweight title between 2017 and 2022. She also previously held the WBC female minimumweight; WBO female junior-flyweight; WBA female super-flyweight; and WBO female bantamweight titles between 2012 and 2017. Fujioka is a member of the International Women's Boxing Hall of Fame.

== Professional career ==
Fujioka made her professional debut on 15 September 2009, scoring a second-round technical knockout (TKO) victory against Napaporn Boonchuon (5–6, 3 KOs) at the Korakuen Hall in Tokyo, Japan. After winning her first three fights, all by TKO, she faced Kanittha Kokietgym (8–2, 2 KOs) for the vacant WBC-OPBF female minimumweight title on 24 September 2010, at the Korakuen Hall. Fujioka captured her first professional title via unanimous decision (UD), with two judges scoring the bout 98–92 and the third scoring it 98–93.

She successfully defended her WBC regional title in December before challenging for her first world title against reigning champion Anabel Ortiz. The bout took place on 8 May 2011 at the Korakuen Hall. Fujioka captured Ortiz' WBC female minimumweight title by eighth-round corner retirement (RTD) after Ortiz failed to come off her stool for the ninth round. At the time of the stoppage, Fujioka was ahead on all three judges' scorecards by 78–72.

Following four more wins, including two defences of her WBC world title against Kanittha Kokietgym in September 2011 and Victoria Argueta in October 2012, Fujioka moved up three weight divisions to challenge Naoko Yamaguchi for her WBA female super-flyweight title on 13 November 2013 at the Korakuen Hall. Fujioka scored a third-round knockdown en route to a UD victory to become a two division world champion, with two judges scoring the bout 97–92 and the third scoring it 98–91. After successfully defending her title against Tomoko Kawanishi in July 2014, Fujioka moved down in weight to challenge Susi Kentikian for her WBA female flyweight title on 8 November 2014 at the Porsche-Arena in Stuttgart, Germany. Fighting for the first time outside of Japan, Fujioka suffered the first defeat of her career in her attempt at a third world title via UD, with the judges' scorecards reading 96–94, 97–94 and 97–93.

She bounced back from defeat with a split decision (SD) win against Mariana Juárez in March 2015 before facing Hee Jung Yuh for the vacant WBO female bantamweight title. The bout took place on 19 October 2015 at the Korakuen Hall. Fujioka defeated Jung Yuh by UD, becoming a three-division world champion with two judges scoring the fight 100–90 and the third scoring it 99–91. Following a successful defence against Shindo Go in June 2016, she moved down two-divisions to challenge Jessica Chávez for her WBC female flyweight title on 1 October 2016 at Centro Regional de Deporte de Las Américas in Ecatepec de Morelos, Mexico. In a contest which saw Fujioka knocked down in the sixth round and a point deduction from Chavez in the tenth and final round for excessive holding, Fujioka suffered the second defeat of her career via UD, with the scorecards reading 94–93, 95–93 and 96–92.

In her next fight she faced Isabel Millan, making her second attempt for the WBA female flyweight title which was left vacant by Kentikian. The bout took place on 13 March 2017 at the Korakuen Hall. Fujioka dropped Millan twice, first in the second round and again in the tenth and final round, prompting the referee to call off the fight 21 seconds into the round, awarding Fujioka a TKO victory. At the time of the stoppage, all three judges had her ahead, with scores of 89–81 twice and 88–82. With the win, she became Japan's first ever four-division world champion. She moved down in weight for her next fight, facing Yokasta Valle for the vacant WBO junior-flyweight title on 1 December 2017 at the Korakuen Hall. Fujioka defeated Valle via UD with scores of 99–91, 98–92, and 96–94 to become Japan's first ever five-division world champion. Moving back up to flyweight, she successfully defended her WBA title by UD against Irma Sánchez in September 2018 before retaining the title through a split draw (SD) against WBO female junior-flyweight champion Tenkai Tsunami in July 2019.

In October 2025, Fujioka was named among the inductees for the 2026 International Women's Boxing Hall of Fame class.

== Professional boxing record ==
23 fights	19 wins	3 losses
By knockout	7	0
By decision	12	3
Draws	1	

No.	Result	Record	Opponent	Type	Round, time	Date	Location	Notes
23	Loss	19–3	Marlen Esparza	UD	10	9 Apr 2022	Alamodome, San Antonio, Texas, U.S.	Lost WBA female flyweight title; For WBC and inaugural The Ring female flyweight titles
22	Win	19–2	Sulem Ochoa	MD	10	9 Jul 2021	Banc of California Stadium, Los Angeles, California, U.S.	Retained WBA female flyweight title
21	Draw	18–2–1	Tenkai Tsunami	SD	10	12 Jul 2019	Korakuen Hall, Tokyo, Japan	Retained WBA female flyweight title
20	Win	18–2	Irma Sánchez	UD	10	14 Sep 2018	Korakuen Hall, Tokyo, Japan	Retained WBA female flyweight title
19	Win	17–2	Yokasta Valle	UD	10	1 Dec 2017	Korakuen Hall, Tokyo, Japan	Won vacant WBO female junior-flyweight title
18	Win	16–2	Isabel Millan	TKO	10 (10), 0:21	13 Mar 2017	Korakuen Hall, Tokyo, Japan	Won vacant WBA female flyweight title
17	Loss	15–2	Jessica Chávez	UD	10	1 Oct 2016	Centro Regional de Deporte de Las Américas, Ecatepec de Morelos, Mexico	For WBC female flyweight title
16	Win	15–1	Shindo Go	UD	10	13 Jun 2016	Korakuen Hall, Tokyo, Japan	Retained WBO female bantamweight title
15	Win	14–1	Hee Jung Yuh	UD	10	19 Oct 2015	Korakuen Hall, Tokyo, Japan	Won vacant WBO female bantamweight title
14	Win	13–1	Mariana Juárez	SD	10	14 Mar 2015	Auditorio Municipal, Naucalpan, Mexico	
13	Loss	12–1	Susi Kentikian	UD	10	8 Nov 2014	Porsche-Arena, Stuttgart, Germany	For WBA female flyweight title
12	Win	12–0	Tomoko Kawanishi	UD	10	7 Jul 2014	Korakuen Hall, Tokyo, Japan	Retained WBA female super-flyweight title
11	Win	11–0	Naoko Yamaguchi	UD	10	13 Nov 2013	Korakuen Hall, Tokyo, Japan	Won WBA female super-flyweight title
10	Win	10–0	Maribel Ramírez	KO	4 (8), 1:30	12 Mar 2013	Korakuen Hall, Tokyo, Japan	
9	Win	9–0	Victoria Argueta	UD	10	28 Oct 2012	Furukawa Sogo Gym, Ōsaki, Japan	Retained WBC female strawweight title
8	Win	8–0	Mayela Perez	UD	8	11 Jul 2012	Korakuen Hall, Tokyo, Japan	
7	Win	7–0	Kanittha Kokietgym	TKO	9 (10), 0:37	22 Sep 2011	Korakuen Hall, Tokyo, Japan	Retained WBC female strawweight title
6	Win	6–0	Anabel Ortiz	RTD	8 (10), 2:00	8 May 2011	Korakuen Hall, Tokyo, Japan	Won WBC female strawweight title
5	Win	5–0	Naoko Shibata	UD	10	15 Dec 2010	Korakuen Hall, Tokyo, Japan	Retained WBC-OPBF female strawweight title
4	Win	4–0	Kanittha Kokietgym	UD	10	24 Sep 2010	Korakuen Hall, Tokyo, Japan	Won vacant WBC-OPBF female strawweight title
3	Win	3–0	Pornboonon Por Vongporramet	TKO	2 (8), 1:58	1 Apr 2010	Korakuen Hall, Tokyo, Japan	
2	Win	2–0	Kazumi Izaki	TKO	2 (6), 1:55	30 Nov 2009	Korakuen Hall, Tokyo, Japan	
1	Win	1–0	Napaporn Boonchuon	TKO	2 (6), 1:27	15 Sep 2009	Korakuen Hall, Tokyo, Japan	

== See also ==
- List of boxing quintuple champions
- List of Japanese boxing world champions

Sporting positions
Regional boxing titles
Vacant Title last held by Amara Naktaku	WBC-OPBF female strawweight champion 24 September 2010 – April 2011; Vacated	Vacant Title next held by Saemi Hanagata
World boxing titles
Preceded by Anabel Ortiz	WBC female strawweight champion 8 May 2011 – October 2013; Vacated	Vacant Title next held by Mari Ando
Preceded by Naoko Yamaguchi	WBA female super-flyweight champion 13 November 2013 – September 2015; Vacated	Succeeded by Linda Laura Lecca interim champion promoted
Vacant Title last held by Carolina Duer	WBO female bantamweight champion 19 October 2015 – September 2016; Vacated	Vacant Title next held by Sabrina Perez
Vacant Title last held by Susi Kentikian	WBA female flyweight champion 13 March 2017 – 9 April 2022	Succeeded by Marlen Esparza
Vacant Title last held by Hong Su-yun	WBO female junior-flyweight champion 1 December 2017 – February 2018; Vacated	Vacant Title next held by Tenkai Tsunami
