= Tina Rupprecht =

German boxer (born 1992)

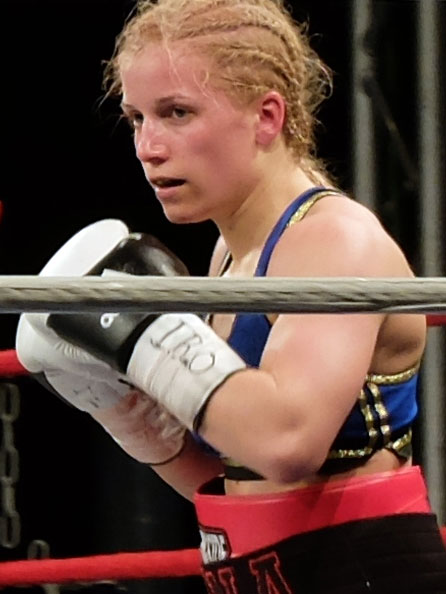
- Rupprecht 2017

Personal information
- Nickname: Tiny Tina
- Born: Christina Rupprecht; 23 August 1992 (age 33) Augsburg, Germany
- Height: 5 ft 0 in (152 cm)
- Weight: Atomweight; Mini flyweight

Boxing career
- Stance: Orthodox

Boxing record
- Total fights: 17
- Wins: 15
- Win by KO: 3
- Losses: 1
- Draws: 1

Christina Rupprecht (born 23 August 1992) is a German former professional boxer who was the undisputed female atomweight champion. She was previously the WBC female mini-flyweight champion from December 2018 until March 2023. As an amateur she won multiple German national titles.

== Amateur career ==
Two years prior to switching to boxing at the age of 14, Tina Rupprecht had joined her childhood boyfriend in kickboxing lessons. Competing for 1. Boxclub Haan Augsburg e.V., she won the 2009 and 2010 German amateur championships for juniors aged under 19 years in paper weight (up to 46 kg). Rupprecht participated in the 2010 European Youth & Junior Women's Championships, where, in her first tournament bout, she was defeated by the subsequent champion Maja Strömberg by 1:9 points. 2011 and 2012, she won the German championships in women's light flyweight. In addition, Rupprecht won the Bavarian championship in 2012, which she was able to repeat in 2013. After a dispute with the German Boxing Federation (Deutscher Boxsport-Verband), with a record of 30 wins, 5 losses and 1 draw, she switched to professional boxing.

== Professional boxing career ==
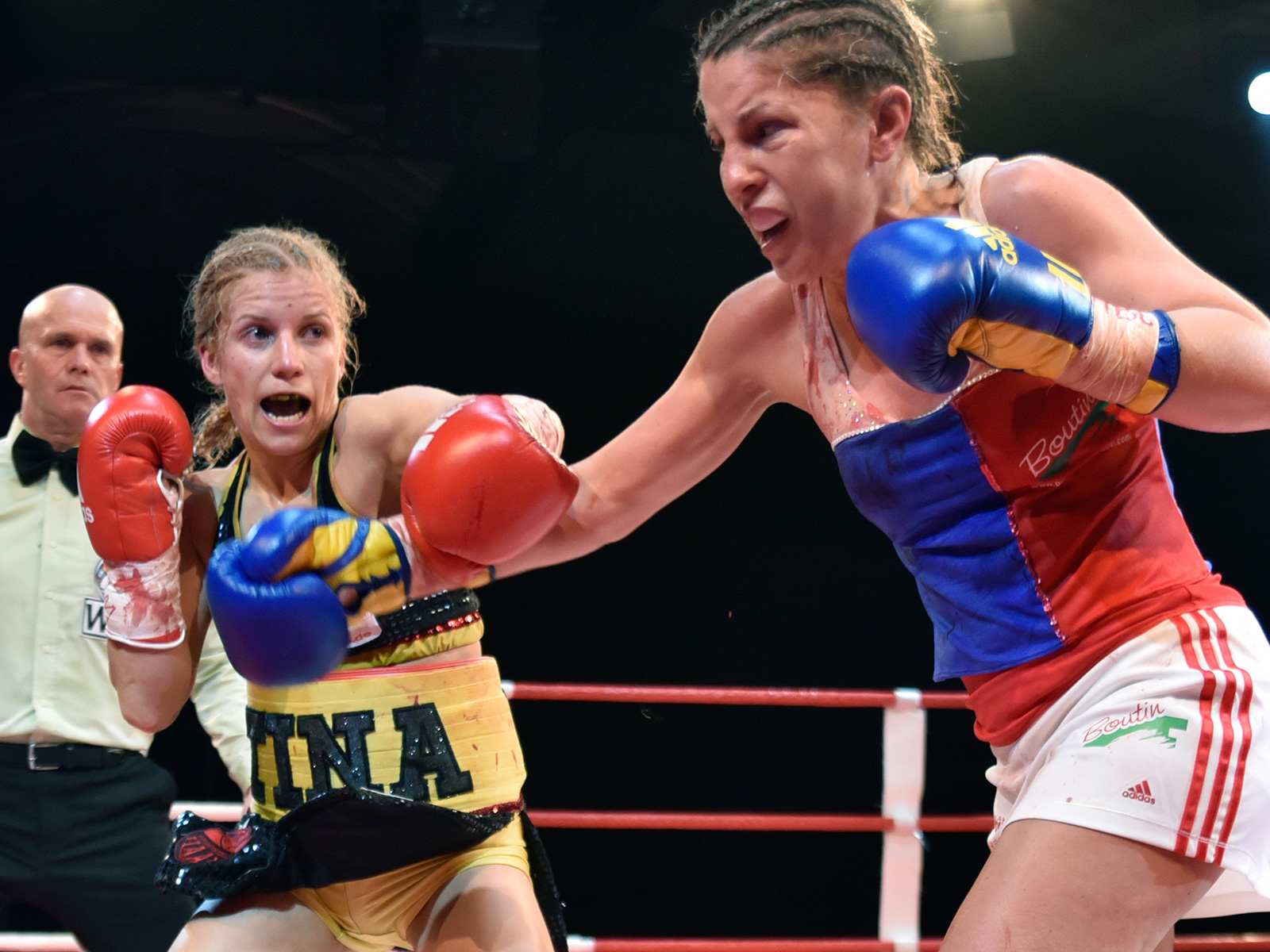
Rupprecht fighting Anne-Sophie Da Costa

With Rupprecht boxing in a weight class attracting only a small number of boxers, arranging fights with competitors on par is difficult. On 7 December 2013, she won her first professional bout at just 50 seconds into the first round by technical knockout.

Winning against Spanish boxer Joana Pastrana on 7 October 2016, Rupprecht obtained the vacant WBC silver minimumweight title.

On 6 May 2017, she won the vacant IBO minimumweight intercontinental championship by defeating Venezuelan fighter Luisana Bolívar.

Rupprecht defeated French boxer Anne Sophie Da Costa on 2 December 2017, to become WBC interim champion and the mandatory challenger for the world championship.

After reigning champion Momo Koseki retired from professional boxing in January 2018, Costa Rican Yokasta Valle was named as Rupprecht's opponent for the vacant world championship. She won the bout in Munich on 16 June 2018, by unanimous decision.

Rupprecht held the title for almost four years until 25 March 2023, when she lost in an unification contest to WBA champion Seniesa Estrada at the Save Mart Center in Fresno, California, USA, by unanimous decision.

She became a two-weight world champion by defeating Fabiana Bytyqi via unanimous decision for the WBC atomweight title at Verti Music Hall in Friedrichshain, Germany, on 13 January 2024.

Rupprecht then added the WBA and WBO belts to her collection with a unanimous decision success over Eri Matsuda at Olympiastützpunkt in Heidelberg, Germany, on 23 November 2024.

She faced IBF female atomweight title holder Sumire Yamanaka in a contest to crown an undisputed champion for the division at the MBS Arena in Potsdam, Germany, on 5 April 2025. Rupprecht won by majority decision with two of the ringside judges scoring the contest 99–91 and 96–95 respectively in her favour, while the third had it a 95–95 draw.

Rupprecht announced her retirement from professional boxing in October 2025.

== Professional boxing record ==
17 fights	15 wins	1 loss
By knockout	3	0
By decision	12	1
Draws	1	

No.	Result	Record	Opponent	Type	Round, time	Date	Location	Notes
17	Win	15–1–1	Sumire Yamanaka	MD	10	5 Apr 2025	MBS Arena, Potsdam, Germany	Retained WBA, WBC, WBO and The Ring female atomweight titles; Won IBF female atomweight title
16	Win	14–1–1	Eri Matsuda	UD	10	23 Nov 2024	Olympiastützpunkt, Heidelberg, Germany	Retained WBC female atomweight title; Won WBA, WBO and inaugural The Ring female atomweight titles
15	Win	13–1–1	Fabiana Bytyqi	UD	10	13 Jan 2024	Verti Music Hall, Friedrichshain, Germany	Won WBC female atomweight title
14	Loss	12–1–1	Seniesa Estrada	UD	10	25 Mar 2023	Save Mart Center, Fresno, California, U.S.	Lost WBC female mini-flyweight title; For WBA and inaugural The Ring female mini-flyweight titles
13	Win	12–0–1	Rocio Gaspar	UD	10	10 Dec 2022	Römerhalle, Heilbronn, Germany	Retained WBC female mini-flyweight title
12	Win	11–0–1	Katia Gutiérrez	SD	10	24 Jul 2021	Hydro-Tech Eisarena, Königsbrunn, Germany	Retained WBC female mini-flyweight title
11	Win	10–0–1	Catalina Diaz	UD	10	21 Dec 2019	Cruise Terminal Altona, Hamburg, Germany	Retained WBC female mini-flyweight title
10	Draw	9–0–1	Maricela Quintero	SD	10	6 Apr 2019	Ballhausforum, Unterschleißheim, Germany	Retained WBC female mini-flyweight title
9	Win	9–0	Niorkis Carreno	UD	10	15 Dec 2018	Stockschützenhalle, Kühbach, Germany	Retained WBC female mini-flyweight title
8	Win	8–0	Yokasta Valle	UD	10	16 Jun 2018	Ballhausforum, Unterschleißheim, Germany	Retained WBC interim female mini-flyweight title
7	Win	7–0	Anne-Sophie Da Costa	UD	10	2 Dec 2017	Stockschützenhalle, Kühbach, Germany	Won vacant WBC interim female mini-flyweight title
6	Win	6–0	Luisana Bolívar	MD	10	6 May 2017	Hydro-Tech Eisarena, Königsbrunn, Germany	Won vacant IBO Inter-Continental female mini-flyweight title
5	Win	5–0	Joana Pastrana	UD	10	7 Oct 2016	Eventcenter, Königsbrunn, Germany	Won vacant WBC Silver female mini-flyweight title
4	Win	4–0	Yana Denisova	UD	6	22 May 2016	Antey Sports Palace, Tambov, Russia	
3	Win	3–0	Viktorija Mihailova	TKO	1 (4), 1:27	16 Apr 2016	FFC 56, Koblenz, Germany	
2	Win	2–0	Ramona Panait	KO	1 (4), 1:19	17 May 2014	Kongress am Park, Augsburg, Germany	
1	Win	1–0	Helena Tosnerova	TKO	1 (4), 0:50	7 Dec 2013	Boxclub Haan, Augsburg, Germany	

== See also ==
- List of female boxers

Sporting positions
Regional boxing titles
Vacant Title last held by Mayela Perez	WBC Silver mini-flyweight champion 7 October 2016 – 2017; Vacated	Vacant Title next held by Fabiana Bytyqi
New title	IBO Inter-Continental mini-flyweight champion 6 May 2017 – 2 December 2017; Won interim title	Vacant
World boxing titles
Vacant Title last held by Eun Young Huh	WBC mini-flyweight champion Interim title 2 December 2017 – 2018; Promoted	Vacant Title next held by Sarah Bormann
Preceded by Momo Koseki; Vacated	WBC mini-flyweight champion 2018 – 25 March 2023	Succeeded by Seniesa Estrada
Preceded by Fabiana Bytyqi	WBC atomweight champion 13 January 2024 – October 2025; Retired	Succeeded by Camila Zamorano interim champion promoted
Preceded by Eri Matsuda	WBA atomweight champion 23 November 2024 – October 2025; Retired	Vacant Title next held by Isabel Rivero
Preceded by Eri Matsuda	WBO atomweight champion 23 November 2024 – October 2025; Retired	Vacant Title next held by Gabriela Timar
Inaugural champion	The Ring atomweight champion 23 November 2024 – October 2025; Retired	Vacant
Preceded by Sumire Yamanaka	IBF atomweight champion 5 April 2025 – October 2025; Retired	Vacant Title next held by Sumire Yamanaka
Inaugural champion	Undisputed atomweight champion 5 April 2025 – October 2025; Retired	Vacant
