= Undisputed championship (boxing) =

Boxer with world titles from all major bodies

In boxing, the undisputed champion of a weight class is the boxer who simultaneously holds world titles from all major organizations recognized by each other and the International Boxing Hall of Fame. There are currently four major sanctioning bodies: WBA, WBC, WBO, and IBF. There were many undisputed champions before the number of major sanctioning bodies recognizing each other increased to four in 2007, but there have been only 26 boxers (11 male and 15 female) to hold all four titles simultaneously.

== History ==
Prior to the 1960s, most champions were "undisputed", although the term was rarely used (it does not appear in one 1970 Boxing Dictionary). Early boxing champions at various weight divisions were established by acclamation between 1880 and 1920. Once a consensus champion had been awarded the title, the championship could usually be taken only by beating the reigning holder, establishing a lineal championship.

The New York State Athletic Commission (NYSAC) recognized champions from its foundation in 1920. The National Boxing Association (NBA) was founded by other U.S. state bodies in 1921, and began recognising champions in 1927. Until the 1960s, both usually recognised the same lineal champion. However, disputes could arise if the champion retired or moved to a different weight class. Occasionally, the International Boxing Union (renamed the European Boxing Union in 1946) recognised a different champion. The disputes were usually short-lived as a lucrative fight would be organised between the rival champions. The longest split was ten years, of the middleweight title, between Mickey Walker's move up to heavyweight in 1931 and NBA champion Tony Zale's defeat of NYSAC contender Georgie Abrams in 1941. An early use of "undisputed" appears in a New York Times preview of the 1941 fight.

The growing popularity of boxing outside of the U.S. led to creation of various boxing organizations, each strengthening their influence – most notably the British Boxing Board of Control (BBBofC) – and having their own champion. This resulted in a growing number of boxers claiming to be legitimate champions. The disruption in boxing was solved after World War II when the World Championship Committee (WCC) was created with NBA as its unanimous authority. The committee, however, was disbanded in 1955 when NBA, along with its new members (which included the Orient, Mexican and South American federations and boxing commissions of the Philippines and Thailand) left WCC citing lack of control over the organisation. The NBA's voting scheme guaranteed one vote for each state commission as well as one vote for each foreign country. On August 23, 1962, the NBA officially became the World Boxing Association and moved their headquarters to Panama City, Panama.

A year later NYSAC along with European Boxing Union and BBBofC supported creation of the World Boxing Council. WBC was officially established on February 14, 1963, in Mexico City, Mexico by 11 countries (the U.S., Argentina, U.K., France, Mexico, Philippines, Panama, Chile, Peru, Venezuela and Brazil) that were invited by the President of Mexico Adolfo López Mateos to form an international organization to unify all commissions of the world to control the expansion of boxing. The reason for the move were concerns about WBA's alleged lack of desire to support professional boxing outside of the U.S..

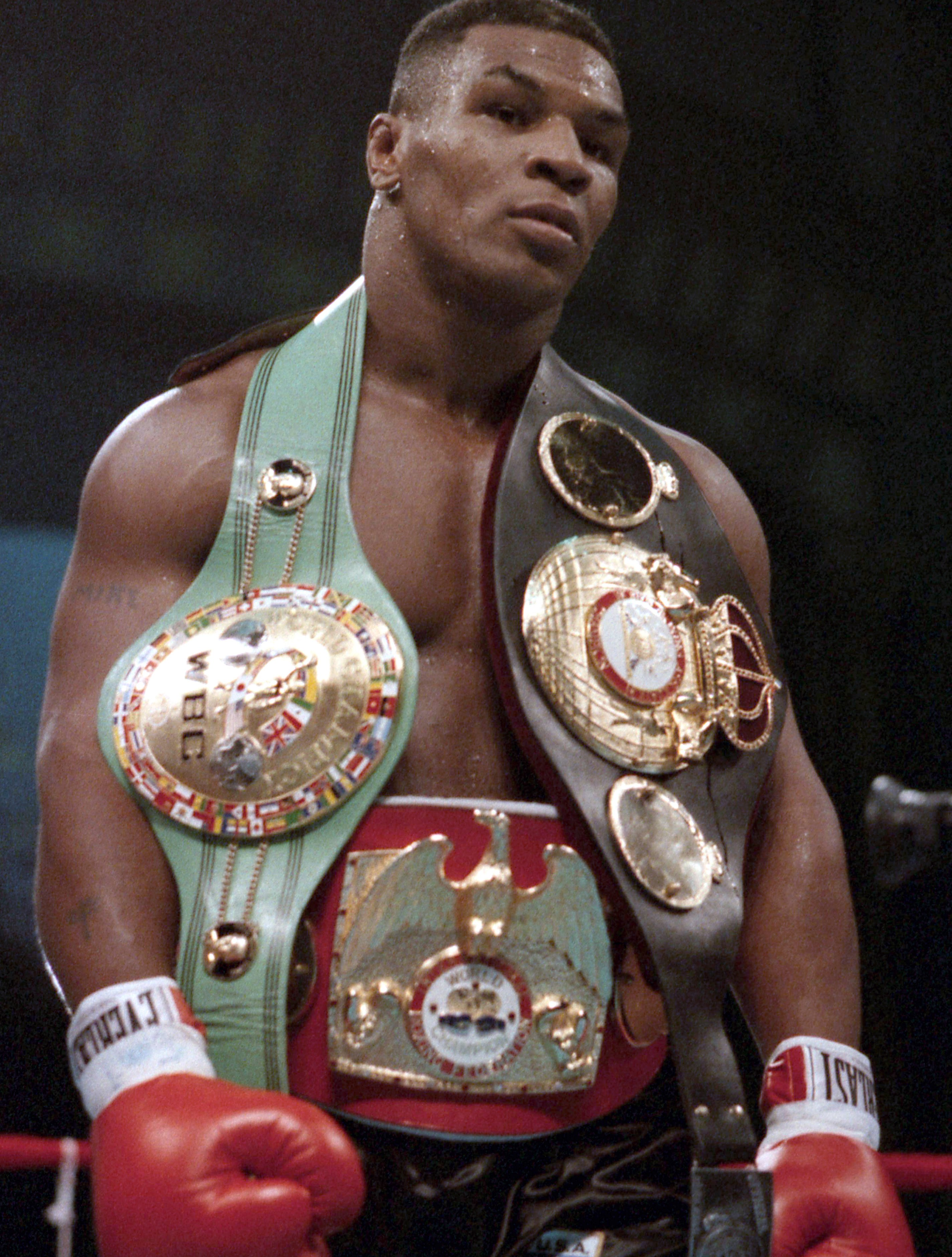
Mike Tyson with the WBC, IBF and WBA belts in 1987

In April 1983, members of United States Boxing Association along with Robert W. Lee (a former WBA vice-president) voted to expand the organisation and form the USBA-International. The organization later changed the name to International Boxing Federation. The inaugural IBF heavyweight champion was Larry Holmes, who relinquished the WBC title to accept IBF's recognition, thus helping the newly formed organization to establish its legitimacy. The fragmentation of titles was thus increased. After some negotiations, the heavyweight title was unified in the heavyweight unification series, a series of coordinated bouts in 1986 and 1987, with Mike Tyson emerging as the first undisputed champion (WBA, WBC, and IBF) since Leon Spinks in 1978. The title was split again in 1992 when Riddick Bowe forfeited the WBC title.

Another major sanctioning body, the World Boxing Organization, was established in 1988 in San Juan, Puerto Rico by a group of local businessmen. At the beginnings, when most of the challengers for WBA, WBC, and IBF titles were Americans, WBO had a wider variety of countries, mainly European, represented in title bouts. Before the Klitschko Era, the United Kingdom tied the United States for most wins in WBO heavyweight title fights with eight. In 1997, WBO titlist Naseem Hamed was allowed to unify titles for the first time in WBO history; on February 8, he defeated Tom Johnson to become unified WBO and IBF featherweight champion. By 2001, the WBA was giving the same recognition to WBO champions as to WBA, WBC, and IBF champions. In 2004, the WBC began naming WBO champions on its ranking listings. The IBF did not recognise the WBO in May 2006, but was doing so by February 2007. Conversely, the WBO has been explicitly recognizing the other three sanctioning bodies since at least October 1, 2008.

Until at least 2008, many considered it sufficient to hold the WBA, WBC, and IBF titles. Other bodies such as the IBO, IBU, and World Boxing Foundation are disregarded.

== Four title undisputed champions ==
Only 11 men have held all four versions of the belts at the same time. Three of those have been the only male boxers to have done so in multiple divisions, with a total of 17 fights that male boxers have been undisputed.

1. Bernard Hopkins unified all four middleweight titles in September 2004.^{[*]}
2. Jermain Taylor won all four middleweight titles from Hopkins in July 2005.^{[*]}
3. Terence Crawford unified all four titles in three weight classes— light welterweight titles in August 2017, the welterweight titles in July 2023, and the super middleweight titles in September 2025.
4. Oleksandr Usyk unified all four titles in two weight classes—cruiserweight in July 2018 and heavyweight twice in May 2024 and July 2025.
5. Josh Taylor unified all four light welterweight titles in May 2021.
6. Canelo Álvarez unified all four super middleweight titles twice in November 2021 and May 2025.
7. Jermell Charlo unified all four light middleweight titles in May 2022.
8. Devin Haney unified all four lightweight titles in June 2022.
9. Naoya Inoue unified all four titles in two weight classes—bantamweight in December 2022 and super bantamweight in December 2023.
10. Artur Beterbiev unified all four light heavyweight titles in October 2024.
11. Dmitry Bivol won all four light heavyweight titles from Beterbiev in February 2025.

Only 15 women have held all four versions of the belts at the same time, two have done so in two divisions, with a total of 20 fights that female boxers have been undisputed.

1. Cecilia Brækhus unified all four welterweight titles in September 2014.
2. Claressa Shields unified all four titles in three weight classes—middleweight twice in April 2019 and October 2022, light middleweight in May 2021, and heavyweight in February 2025.
3. Katie Taylor unified all four lightweight titles in June 2019 and won all four light welterweight titles Twice in November 2023, and September 2026.
4. Jessica McCaskill won all four welterweight titles from Brækhus in August 2020.
5. Franchón Crews-Dezurn unified all four super middleweight titles in April 2022.
6. Chantelle Cameron unified all four light welterweight titles in November 2022.
7. Amanda Serrano unified all four featherweight titles in February 2023.
8. Alycia Baumgardner unified all four super featherweight titles in February 2023.
9. Savannah Marshall won all four super middleweight titles from Crews-Dezurn in July 2023.
10. Seniesa Estrada unified all four minimumweight titles in March 2024.
11. Gabriela Fundora unified all four flyweight titles in November 2024.
12. Tina Rupprecht unified all four atomweight titles in April 2025.
13. Cherneka Johnson unified all four bantamweight titles in July 2025.
14. Ellie Scotney unified all four super bantamweight April 2026.
15. Dina Thorslund won all four bantamweight titles in August 2026.

As of September 2026, there have been 41 fights with all four belts on the line, with a total of 37 title fights from male to female to be undisputed overall.

== Disputed undisputed champions ==
If a fighter wins all the titles but is stripped by one organization of its title, he may continue to be considered the undisputed champion.

Roy Jones Jr. was called the undisputed light heavyweight champion after unifying the WBA, WBC, and IBF titles in June 1999. He was later awarded The Ring championship title. However, two of those titles (WBA and IBF) had been stripped from Dariusz Michalczewski, who had unified them with his WBO title by beating the lineal champion Virgil Hill in June 1997 and subsequently remained unbeaten, defending his remaining title, until his first loss in October 2003. Speaking of Jones' claim to being undisputed champion, one writer opined that the distinction "could just as easily belong to current WBO titleist Dariusz Michalczewski."

Five months after Lennox Lewis unified the WBA, WBC, and IBF titles to become the undisputed heavyweight champion, a U.S. Federal Judge ruled that Lewis would be stripped by the WBA of their world championship belt for fighting Michael Grant instead of the association's #1 contender, John Ruiz. The fight took place on April 29, 2000. Lewis remained a unified world champion until April 22, 2001, when he was defeated by Hasim Rahman. He regained the WBC and IBF titles following victory over Rahman seven months later in a rematch. His reign as a unified world champion ended in September 2002, when he rejected the chance to fight the IBF's #1 contender, Chris Byrd, and was therefore stripped by the organisation of their belt. He retained his WBC title until his retirement in February 2004.

Jermain Taylor won all four middleweight titles from Bernard Hopkins in July 2005, but was stripped of the IBF title for agreeing to a rematch rather than fighting Sam Soliman. Nevertheless, he was still described as "undisputed champion" by some reports.

After Joe Calzaghe's super middleweight victory over Mikkel Kessler in November 2007, he was frequently described as "undisputed champion". Others disputed this, because although he held the WBA, WBC, and WBO titles, he had vacated his IBF title in November 2006 for choosing to face Peter Manfredo Jr. as his next opponent instead of mandatory challenger Robert Stieglitz.

Teófimo López won the WBC Franchise lightweight title in addition to the WBA (Super), IBF, WBO and The Ring magazine titles after beating Vasiliy Lomachenko in October 2020, and was subsequently reported by some media outlets to be the youngest four-belt undisputed champion of all-time at the age of 23 years old; however, the WBC Franchise title is not universally recognized as a major world title.

== Unified championship ==
The unified champion is defined as a boxer that holds at least two world championships of major sanctioning bodies (WBA, WBC, IBF, or WBO) in their respective division. Around 2004, the World Boxing Association recognized three different types: the unified champion (two-titles holder in the weight division or category, obliged to defend the title against WBA's No. 1 contender in 18 months periodically), the undisputed champion (three-title holder, mandatory defense against WBA's challenger in 21 months regularly), and the super champion (four-title holder, WBA's mandatory defense in 24 months periodically). The rules required only one unified/undisputed/super champion per weight class; the purse in the bid would be distributed in a 65/35 ratio in favor of the unified champion. However, along with the changes to "super" status (besides holding more than one title, the super titles were awarded to champions that were able to defend the WBA title 5 times), the term "undisputed" was dropped completely.

=== Current unified champions ===
As of 21 November 2026

Keys:

Undisputed champion

Weight class	Champion	Recognition	Consec. defenses	Reign began
Mini flyweight	vacant			
Light flyweight	René Santiago	WBA, WBO	1	December 17, 2025
Flyweight	Sergio Mendoza	WBA, WBC	0	October 10, 2026
Super flyweight	vacant			
Bantamweight	vacant			
Super bantamweight	Naoya Inoue	WBA, WBC, IBF, WBO	8	July 23, 2023
Featherweight	vacant			
Super featherweight	O'Shaquie Foster	WBC, IBF, WBO	0	October 24, 2026
Lightweight	vacant			
Light welterweight	vacant			
Welterweight	vacant			
Light middleweight	Jaron Ennis	WBA, WBO	0	June 27, 2026
Middleweight	vacant			
Super middleweight	vacant			
Light heavyweight	Dmitry Bivol	WBA, IBF, WBO	1	February 22, 2025
Cruiserweight	David Benavidez	WBA, WBO	0	May 2, 2026
Heavyweight	vacant			

=== Women's current unified champions ===
As of September 21, 2025

Keys:

Undisputed champion

Weight class	Champion	Recognition	Consec. defenses	Reign began
Atomweight	Christina Rupprecht	WBC, WBO, WBA, IBF	1	November 23, 2024
Mini flyweight	vacant			
Light flyweight	Evelin Bermúdez	WBA, IBF, WBO	4	March 10, 2023
Flyweight	Gabriela Fundora	IBF, WBA, WBC, WBO	1	November 2, 2024
Super flyweight	vacant			
Bantamweight	Cherneka Johnson	WBA, WBC, IBF, WBO	0	July 11, 2025
Super bantamweight	Ellie Scotney	WBA, WBC, IBF, WBO	0	April 5, 2026
Featherweight	Amanda Serrano	WBA, WBC, IBF, WBO	6	February 4, 2021
Super featherweight	Alycia Baumgardner	WBA, WBC, IBF, WBO	3	November 13, 2021
Lightweight	vacant			
Light welterweight	Katie Taylor	WBA, IBF, WBO	2	November 25, 2023
Welterweight	Lauren Price	WBA, WBC, IBF	0	March 7, 2025
Light middleweight	Mikaela Mayer	WBA, WBC, WBO	0	October 26, 2025
Middleweight	Desley Robinson	IBF, WBO	0	April 11, 2025
Super middleweight	Franchón Crews-Dezurn	WBC, WBA	1	March 24, 2024
Super middleweight	Shadasia Green	WBO, IBF	0	July 11, 2025
Light heavyweight	vacant			
Heavyweight	Claressa Shields	WBC, WBA, IBF, WBO	2	July 27, 2024

=== Most wins in unified championship bouts ===
Keys:

Active title reign
Reign has ended

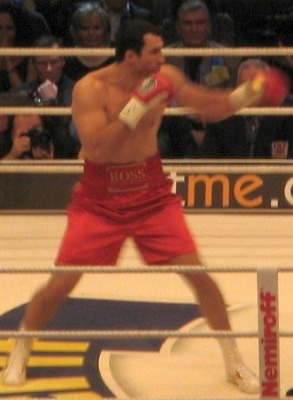
Wladimir Klitschko won the unified championship in 2008 and defended it 14 times

	Name	Title recognition	Division	Title bout wins
1.	(Japan) Naoya Inoue	WBA, WBC, IBF, WBO	Bantamweight; Super Bantamweight	16
2.	(Ukraine) Wladimir Klitschko	WBA, IBF, WBO	Heavyweight	15
3.	(Mexico) (Cuba) José Nápoles	WBA, WBC	Welterweight	14
3.	(United States) Muhammad Ali	WBA, WBC	Heavyweight	14
5.	(United States) Marvin Hagler	WBA, WBC, IBF	Middleweight	13
5.	(Mexico) Canelo Alvarez	WBA, WBC, IBF, WBO	Light Middleweight Middleweight Super Middleweight	13
7.	(Argentina) Carlos Monzón	WBA, WBC	Middleweight	12
7.	(United States) Roy Jones Jr.	WBA, WBC, IBF	Light heavyweight	12
9.	(United States) Evander Holyfield	WBA, WBC, IBF	Heavyweight; Cruiserweight	11
10.	(United States) Bob Foster	WBA, WBC	Light heavyweight	10
10.	(Puerto Rico) Carlos Ortiz	WBA, WBC	Lightweight	10
10.	(Ukraine) Oleksandr Usyk	WBA, WBC, IBF, WBO	Cruiserweight Heavyweight	10
13.	(United States) Bernard Hopkins	WBA, WBC, IBF, WBO	Light heavyweight Middleweight	9
13.	(United States) Mike Tyson	WBA, WBC, IBF	Heavyweight	9
15.	(United States Virgin Islands) Emile Griffith	WBA, WBC	Middleweight; Welterweight	8
15.	(Italy) Nino Benvenuti	WBA, WBC	Middleweight; Light middleweight	8
15.	(Mexico) Vicente Saldivar	WBA, WBC	Featherweight	8
18.	(United States) Pernell Whitaker	WBA, WBC, IBF	Lightweight	7
19.	(United States) Terence Crawford	WBA, WBC, IBF, WBO	Light welterweight Welterweight; Super middleweight	6
19.	(United Kingdom) Lennox Lewis	WBA, WBC, IBF	Heavyweight	6
19.	(Mexico) Juan Manuel Márquez	WBA, IBF, WBO	Lightweight; Featherweight	6
19.	(Philippines) Gabriel Elorde	WBA, WBC	Super featherweight	6
19.	(Mexico) Rubén Olivares	WBA, WBC	Bantamweight	6
24.	(United States) Floyd Mayweather Jr.	WBA, WBC	Light middleweight Welterweight	5
24.	(Nigeria) Dick Tiger	WBA, WBC	Light heavyweight Middleweight	5
24.	(Russia) Sergey Kovalev	WBA, IBF, WBO	Light heavyweight	5
24.	(Kazakhstan) Gennady Golovkin	WBA, WBC, IBF	Middleweight	5
24.	(Japan) Fighting Harada	WBA, WBC	Bantamweight	5
24.	(United States) Joe Frazier	WBA, WBC	Heavyweight	5
24.	(Australia) Kostya Tszyu	WBA, WBC	Light welterweight	5
24.	(Germany) Sven Ottke	WBA, IBF	Super middleweight	5
24.	(United States) Terry Norris	WBC, IBF	Light middleweight	5
33.	(United States) Andre Ward	WBA, WBC, IBF, WBO	Light heavyweight Super middleweight	4
33.	(Mexico) Julio César Chávez	WBA, WBC, IBF	Light welterweight Lightweight	4
33.	(Armenia) Vic Darchinyan	WBA, WBC, IBF	Super flyweight	4
33.	(United States) George Foreman	WBA, WBC, IBF	Heavyweight	4
33.	(Cuba) Guillermo Rigondeaux	WBA, WBO	Super bantamweight	4
33.	(Mexico) Humberto González	WBC, IBF	Light flyweight	4
33.	(United Kingdom) Naseem Hamed	WBO, IBF	Featherweight	4
33.	(United Kingdom) Anthony Joshua	WBA, IBF, WBO	Heavyweight	4

=== Most consecutive defenses of unified title ===
Keys:

Active title reign
Reign has ended

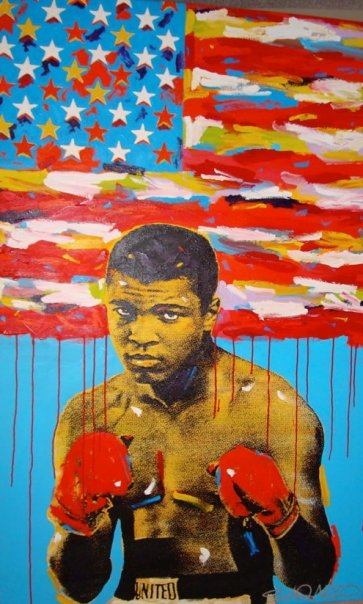
Muhammad Ali defended the unified/undisputed heavyweight championship 10 times; the record was unbeaten for 36 years

	Name	Title recognition	Division	Consec. defenses
1.	(Ukraine) Wladimir Klitschko	WBA, IBF, WBO	Heavyweight	14
2.	(United States) Marvin Hagler	WBA, WBC, IBF	Middleweight	12
3.	(United States) Muhammad Ali	WBA, WBC	Heavyweight	10
3.	(United States) Roy Jones Jr.	WBA, WBC, IBF	Light heavyweight	10
5.	(Argentina) Carlos Monzón	WBA, WBC	Middleweight	9
6.	(Japan) Naoya Inoue	WBC, WBO	Super Bantanmweight	8
6.	(United States) Mike Tyson	WBA, WBC, IBF	Heavyweight	8
8.	(United States) Bernard Hopkins	WBA, WBC, IBF, WBO	Middleweight	7
8.	(Mexico) Vicente Saldivar	WBA, WBC	Featherweight	7
10.	(Japan) Naoya Inoue	WBA, IBF	Bantanmweight	6
10.	(Mexico) (Cuba) José Nápoles	WBA, WBC	Welterweight	6
10.	(United States) Pernell Whitaker	WBA, WBC, IBF	Lightweight	6
12.	(United States) Bob Foster	WBA, WBC	Light heavyweight	5
12.	(Kazakhstan) Gennady Golovkin	WBA, WBC, IBF	Middleweight	5
12.	(Puerto Rico) Carlos Ortiz	WBA, WBC	Lightweight	5
12.	(Philippines) Gabriel Elorde	WBA, WBC	Super featherweight	5
16.	(Italy) Nino Benvenuti	WBA, WBC	Middleweight	4
16.	(Russia) Sergey Kovalev	WBA, IBF, WBO	Light heavyweight	4
16.	(Japan) Fighting Harada	WBA, WBC	Bantamweight	4
16.	(United States) Joe Frazier	WBA, WBC	Heavyweight	4
16.	(Australia) Kostya Tszyu	WBA, WBC	Light welterweight	4
16.	(Germany) Sven Ottke	WBA, IBF	Super middleweight	4
16.	(United States) Terry Norris	WBC, IBF	Light middleweight	4
23.	(United States) Floyd Mayweather Jr.	WBA, WBC	Welterweight	3
23.	(United States) Evander Holyfield	WBA, WBC, IBF	Heavyweight	3
23.	(United States) Terence Crawford	WBA, WBC, IBF, WBO	Light welterweight	3
23.	(Mexico) Humberto González	WBC, IBF	Light flyweight	3
23.	(Mexico) Juan Manuel Márquez	WBA, IBF	Featherweight	3
23.	(Armenia) Vic Darchinyan	WBA, WBC, IBF	Super flyweight	3
23.	(United Kingdom) Lennox Lewis	WBC, IBF	Heavyweight	3
23.	(Cuba) Guillermo Rigondeaux	WBA, WBO	Super bantamweight	3
23.	(United Kingdom) Anthony Joshua	WBA, IBF, WBO	Heavyweight	3

== Unification series ==
Tournaments have been arranged to unify the titles in a weight class.

- The HBO Heavyweight Boxing Series, held in 1986–88, crowned Mike Tyson as the undisputed heavyweight champion.
- World Boxing Super Series, held since 2017, produced Oleksandr Usyk as the undisputed cruiserweight champion.

== See also ==
- List of undisputed world boxing champions
- List of female undisputed world boxing champions
- List of current world boxing champions
- Lineal championship

== Notes ==
1. The WBO was not yet recognized as a major title by all other major sanctioning bodies (WBA, WBC and IBF) at the time.
