= Joana Pastrana =

Spanish boxer (born 1990)

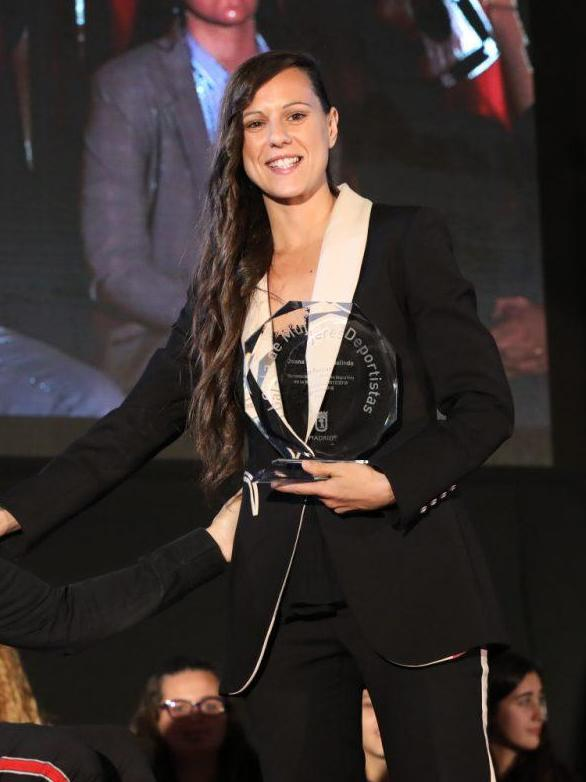
- Pastrana in 2018

Personal information
- Nationality: Spanish
- Born: 29 September 1990 (age 36) Madrid, Spain
- Height: 1.61 m (5 ft 3 in)
- Weight: Mini-flyweight

Boxing career

Boxing record
- Total fights: 20
- Wins: 17
- Win by KO: 5
- Losses: 3

Joana Pastrana Gallardo (born 29 September 1990) is a Spanish former professional boxer who held the IBF female mini-flyweight title from 2018 to 2019. At regional level, she was a two-time European female mini-flyweight champion.

== Career ==
=== Early career ===
Pastrana started boxing in 2013 in amateur competitions in her hometown Lozoyuela, Madrid. Before boxing, Pastrana practiced Muay Thai and kickboxing, but she did not like them, so she switched to boxing.

=== Professional career ===
Pastrana debuted professionally on 6 February 2016 defeating Bulgarian fighter Ivana Yaneva by technical knockout at the first round in a bout held at the Restaurante Escuela Taurina in Fuente el Saz de Jarama in the Community of Madrid. At the time, Pastrana became the only professional boxer from Madrid.

On 7 October 2016, Pastrana competed for the vacant WBC silver female minimumweight title against Tina Rupprecht, but lost by unanimous decision after ten rounds. This was also the first loss in her professional career.

On 5 May 2017, Pastrana won the European female minimumweight title, after defeating French boxer Sandy Coget by unanimous decision, in a bout held at the Palacio Vistalegre in Madrid. A few months later, on 22 September 2017, Pastrana made the first defense of her European title against Judit Hachbold, defeating the Hungarian fighter by knockout in the third round.

On 22 June 2018, Pastrana won the IBF female minimumweight title, her first world title, against German Asiye Özlem Sahin. Pastrana became the second Spanish female boxer to win a world title after María Jesús Rosa Reina, who won an IBF world championship in 2004.

Pastrana made two successful defenses of her world title. One against Siriporn Thaweesuk won by technical knockout and another one against Ana Arrazola won by unanimous decision.

On 4 August 2019, Pastrana lost her title to Yokasta Valle from Costa Rica in a bout held in Marbella, going down by split decision after ten rounds.

Pastrana defeated Catalina Diaz by unanimous decision at Pabellón Ciudad Deportiva Navafría in Moralzarzal on 16 October 2020 to win the vacant European female mini-flyweight title.

She successfully defended the title via unanimous decision against Anne Sophie Da Costa at WiZink Center in Madrid on 26 June 2021. After the fight, Pastrana announced her retirement from professional boxing.

=== Outside Boxing ===
In 2023 Joana Pastrana played the Spanish version of The Traitors. She was a faithful and won with Leo Margets.

== Professional boxing record ==
20 fights	17 wins	3 losses
By knockout	5	0
By decision	12	3

No.	Result	Record	Opponent	Type	Round, time	Date	Location	Notes
20	Win	17–3	(France) Anne Sophie Da Costa	UD	10	26 Jun 2021	WiZink Center, Madrid, Spain	Retained European female mini-flyweight title
19	Win	16–3	(Spain) Catalina Diaz	UD	10	16 Oct 2020	Pabellón Ciudad Deportiva Navafría, Moralzarzal, Spain	Won vacant European female mini-flyweight title
18	Loss	15–3	(Mexico) Katia Gutiérrez	SD	10	23 Nov 2019	Pabellón Ciudad Deportiva Navafría, Moralzarzal, Spain	For vacant WBC Silver female mini-flyweight title
17	Loss	15–2	(Costa Rica) Yokasta Valle	SD	10	4 Aug 2019	Plaza de Toros de Puerto Banús, Marbella, Spain	Lost IBF female mini-flyweight title
16	Win	15–1	(Mexico) Ana Arrazola	UD	10	9 Mar 2019	Pabellón Ciudad Deportiva Navafría, Moralzarzal, Spain	Retained IBF female mini-flyweight title
15	Win	14–1	(Thailand) Siriporn Thaweesuk	TKO	7 (10)	5 Oct 2018	Polideportivo José Caballero, Alcobendas, Spain	Retained IBF female mini-flyweight title
14	Win	13–1	(Germany) Asiye Özlem Sahin	MD	10	22 Jun 2018	Polideportivo José Caballero, Alcobendas, Spain	Won vacant IBF female mini-flyweight title
13	Win	12–1	(Slovakia) Claudia Ferenczi	UD	6	17 Nov 2017	Pabellón Municipal José Antonio Paraíso, Torrejón de Ardoz, Spain	
12	Win	11–1	(Hungary) Judit Hachbold	KO	3 (10)	22 Sep 2017	Polideportivo José Caballero, Alcobendas, Spain	Retained European female mini-flyweight title
11	Win	10–1	(Slovakia) Claudia Ferenczi	UD	6	30 Jun 2017	Recinto Ferial, Colmenar Viejo, Spain	
10	Win	9–1	(France) Sandy Coget	UD	10	5 May 2017	Palacio Vistalegre, Madrid, Spain	Won vacant European female mini-flyweight title
9	Win	8–1	(Hungary) Judit Hachbold	UD	6	11 Mar 2017	Gimnasio Metropolitano, Madrid, Spain	
8	Loss	7–1	(Germany) Tina Rupprecht	UD	10	7 Oct 2016	Eventcenter, Königsbrunn, Germany	For vacant WBC Silver female mini-flyweight title
7	Win	7–0	(Colombia) Katherine Quintana	UD	6	25 Jun 2016	Recinto Ferial, Colmenar Viejo, Spain	
6	Win	6–0	(Romania) Melinda Pantis	UD	6	27 May 2016	Polideportivo José Caballero, Alcobendas, Spain	
5	Win	5–0	(Romania) Melinda Pantis	UD	4	7 May 2016	Gimnasio del Rayo Vallecano, Madrid, Spain	
4	Win	4–0	(Bulgaria) Teodora Bacheva	UD	6	9 Apr 2016	Casino Gran Madrid, Torrelodones, Spain	
3	Win	3–0	(Bulgaria) Ana Mariya Simeonova	TKO	2 (4)	19 Mar 2016	Polideportivo Municipal, Fuente el Saz de Jarama, Spain	
2	Win	2–0	(Spain) Maribel de Sousa	TKO	1 (4)	28 Feb 2016	Gimnasio del Rayo Vallecano, Madrid, Spain	
1	Win	1–0	(Bulgaria) Ivana Yaneva	TKO	1 (4)	6 Feb 2016	Restaurante Escuela Taurina, Fuente el Saz de Jarama, Spain	
