= Nguyễn Thị Thu Nhi =

Vietnamese boxer (born 1996)

Personal information
- Nickname: Black Angel
- Born: 22 October 1996 (age 29) Ho Chi Minh City, Vietnam
- Height: 5 ft 2 in (157 cm)
- Weight: Mini-flyweight

Boxing career
- Stance: Orthodox

Boxing record
- Total fights: 6
- Wins: 5
- Win by KO: 1
- Losses: 1

Nguyễn Thị Thu Nhi (born 22 October 1996) is a Vietnamese professional boxer. She is the first Vietnamese boxer to have won a world championship having held the WBO female mini-flyweight title from 23 October 2021 until 8 September 2022.

== Boxing career ==
=== Early career ===
Before turning professional Thu Nhi won gold medals at the 2015, 2017 and 2018 national championships. In 2015 she defeated Bo Ra Kim while competing in a Vietnam vs. Korea semi-professional tournament.

Thu Nhi made her professional debut on 3 October 2015, scoring a six-roundpoints victory against Bo Ra Kim at the Nguyen Du Gymnasium in Ho Chi Minh City, Vietnam. Thu Nhi was next faced Chan Mi Lim on 25 August 2019, following a four-year absence from professional boxing. She won the fight by unanimous decision, with scores of 60–53, 60–54 and 60–55. Three months later, on 3 November 2019, Thu Nhi faced Kannika Bangnara. The bout once again took place at the District 7 Arena in Ho Chi Minh City. She won the fight by a first-round technical knockout. It was the first stoppage victory of her career.

Thu Nhi was booked to face Kanyarat Yoohanngoh for the vacant WBO Asia Pacific minimumweight title on 29 February 2020, at the Felix Hotel Casino in Bavet, Cambodia. It was Thu Nhi's first professional title fight and her first fight outside of Vietnam. She won the fight by majority decision. Two of the judges scored the fight 99–90 in her favor, while the third judge scored the fight 95–94 for Yoohanngoh.

=== WBO mini-flyweight champion ===
Thu Nhi was booked to challenge the reigning WBO mini flyweight champion Etsuko Tada, in what was Tada's first title defense. The fight was scheduled for the undercard of the Olimjon Nazarov and Michael Mendoza WBO Oriental flyweight title bout, which took place on 23 October 2021 at the Wadong Gymnasium in Ansan, South Korea. Thu Nhi won the fight by unanimous decision, with all three judges scoring the fight 96–94 in her favor. She became the first Vietnamese boxer to capture a WBO world title.

Thu Nhi faced the IBF mini flyweight champion Yokasta Valle in a title unification bout on 8 September 2022. The bout headlined a DAZN broadcast card, which took place at the Ciudad Deportiva Heiner Ugalde in San José, Costa Rica. Thu Nhi lost the fight by a shutout unanimous decision, with all three judges awarding all ten rounds to her opponent.

== Professional boxing record ==
6 fights	5 wins	1 loss
By knockout	1	0
By decision	4	1

No.	Result	Record	Opponent	Type	Round, time	Date	Location	Notes
6	Loss	5–1	Yokasta Valle	UD	10	8 Sep 2022	Ciudad Deportiva Heiner Ugalde, San José, Costa Rica	Lost WBO female mini-flyweight title; For IBF female mini flyweight title
5	Win	5–0	Etsuko Tada	UD	10	23 Oct 2021	Wadong Gymnasium, Ansan, South Korea	Won WBO female mini-flyweight title
4	Win	4–0	Kanyarat Yoohanngo	SD	10	29 Feb 2020	Felix Hotel Casino, Bavet, Cambodia	Won vacant WBO Asia Pacific female mini-flyweight title
3	Win	3–0	Kannika Bangnara	TKO	1 (8), 0:56	3 Nov 2019	District 7 Arena, Ho Chi Minh City, Vietnam	
2	Win	2–0	Chan Mi Lim	UD	6	25 Aug 2019	District 7 Arena, Ho Chi Minh City, Vietnam	
1	Win	1–0	Bo Ra Kim	PTS	6	3 Oct 2015	Nguyen Du Gymnasium, Ho Chi Minh City, Vietnam	

Sporting positions
World boxing titles
Preceded by Etsuko Tada	WBO female mini-flyweight champion 23 October 2021 – 8 September 2022	Succeeded by Yokasta Valle
