= Asiye Özlem Sahin =

German boxer

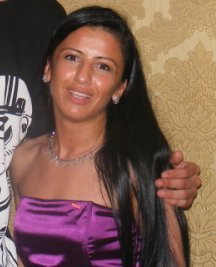
- Sahin after her fight against O. Romanova in 2010, Istanbul
- Born: 13 August 1976 (age 50); Trabzon, Turkey
- Native name: Asiye Özlem Şahin
- Other names: Sugar
- Nationality: German; Turkish
- Height: 5 ft 0.4 in (1.53 m)
- Weight: Light flyweight
- Style: Right-handed
- Fighting out of: Ludwigsburg, Baden-Württemberg
- Team: MBC Ludwigsburg
- Trainer: Achim Böhme (2002–2010); Conny Mittermeier (2010); Sebastian Tlatlik (2018–)
- Years active: 1998–

Professional boxing record
- Total: 28
- Wins: 25
- By knockout: 8
- Losses: 2
- By knockout: 0
- Draws: 1

Other information
- Occupation: Technical specialist at Bosch
- Website: www.sahin-oezlem.de
- Boxing record from BoxRec

Asiye Özlem Sahin (Turkish: Asiye Özlem Şahin, born 13 August 1976) is a Turkish-born professional boxer, representing Germany, fighting out of Ludwigsburg.

Had her professional debut in 2007, Sahin currently holds a professional record consisting of 25 wins including 8 knockouts, 2 losses and 1 draw at her professional career, as of 2019 March.

As of 2019, she is represented by Eva Dzepina and trained by Sebastian Tlatlik.

== Career ==
Born in Trabzon, Sahin spent her childhood with grandparents, aunts and uncles. She attended "Şubat İlköğretim Okulu", her primary school at her hometown.

She moved to Germany with her family at the age of 11, in 1987, united with her parents and started to learn German language. While studying at vocational school, she began to apprenticeship at German technology-based goods supplier company Bosch, where she works since 1995.

Sahin began to train first in kickboxing discipline in 1998, influenced by her brother Ümit. In 2002, she joined MBC Ludwigsburg (formerly named as KTB Ludwigsburg) and trained by Achim Böhme until 2010.

She chose to represent Germany at amateur level and joined national team in 2006. She won Germany International Amateur Boxing Championships twice in 2005 and 2006. Her amateur record is consisting of 11 wins and 1 loss.

Sahin turned professional in 2007. She started to train along with former Universum Box-Promotion coach Conny Mittermeier. Her encounter against Ukrainian Oksana Romanova taken place at Abdi İpekçi Arena on 5 June 2010 was the first ever women's professional boxing bout in Turkey.

On 21 June 2014, beating Thai Buangern Onesongchaigym at Austrian capital of Vienna, Sahin won the world titles of WIBF and Global Boxing Union (GBU), along with Intercontinental title of World Boxing Federation (WBF).

She was honoured as "Athlete of the Year 2014" by District Council of Remseck am Neckar, Ludwigsburg.

Her next bout is announced to encounter French boxer Anne-Sophie Da Costa on 16 March 2019, in Essen, Germany.

== Professional boxing record ==
24 Wins (8 knockouts, 14 decisions), 2 Losses, 1 Draw
Res.	Record	Opponent	Type	Rnd. Time	Date	Location	Notes
Win	25-2	(France) Anne-Sophie Da Costa	UD	10 (10)	2019-03-16	(Germany) Eventhalle "Am Hallo", Essen	Women's International Boxing Association World Minimumweight Title
Loss	24-2	(Spain) Joana Pastrana	MD	8 (8)	2018-06-22	(Spain) Polideportivo José Caballero, Alcobendas	
Win	24-1	(Georgia (country)) Teona Pirosmanashvili	RTD	3 (8)	2018-04-07	(Germany) Unihalle Wuppertal, Wuppertal	Loss vacant International Boxing Federation World Female Minimumweight Title
Win	23-1	(France) Sandy Coget	UD	10 (10)	2017-08-05	(Germany) Essen	Retained vacant UBO World female minimumweight title and World Boxing Federation Intercontinental female minimumweight title
Win	22-1	(Slovakia) Claudia Ferenczi	UD	6 (6)	2017-03-17	(Germany) Recover Fight Club, Essen	
Win	21-1	(Hungary) Agnes Draxler	TKO	2 (10), 1:46	2016-06-18	(Germany) EMKA Sportzentrum, Velbert, Nordrhein-Westfalen	Won vacant UBO World female minimumweight title and World Boxing Federation Intercontinental female minimumweight title
Win	20-1	(Austria) Elke Beinwachs	PTS	10	2016-03-26	(Germany) Stadthalle Fürth, Fürth, Bayern	
Loss	19-1	(Philippines) Gretchen Abaniel	SD	10	2015-11-07	(Germany) Ludwigsburg MHP Arena, Ludwigsburg, Baden-Württemberg	Loss IBF and GBU World light flyweight titles.
Win	19-0	(Slovenia) Claudia Ferenczi	UD	10	2015-05-30	(Germany) Boxsporthalle Braamkamp, Winterhude, Hamburg	
Win	18-0	(Thailand) Buangern Onesongchaigym	KO	6 (10)	2014-06-21	Trend Eventhotel Pyramide, Vienna, Austria	Won IBF and GBU World, and WBF Intercontinental titles.
Win	17-0	(Austria) Elke Beinwachs	PTS	6 (6)	2014-04-26	Hansehalle, Lübeck, Schleswig-Holstein, Germany	
Win	16-0	(Italy) Maria Rosa Tabbuso	MD	6 (6)	2013-11-16	Ludwigsburg MHP Arena, Ludwigsburg, Baden-Württemberg, Germany	
Win	15-0	(Serbia) Mirela Barudzic	PTS	4 (4)	2013-09-07	Bärengarten, Ravensburg, Baden-Württemberg, Germany	
Win	14-0	(Hungary) Agnes Draxler	TKO	2 (6)	2012-12-21	Maritim Hotel, Halle an der Saale, Sachsen-Anhalt, Germany	
Win	13-0	(Romania) Corina Carlescu	PTS	10 (10)	2011-07-15	EWS Arena, Göppingen, Baden-Württemberg, Germany	Won interim IBF World light flyweight title.
Win	12-0	(Russia) Evgeniya Zablotskaya	UD	8 (8)	2011-04-11	Digibet Pferdesportpark, Lichtenberg, Berlin, Germany	
Win	11-0	(Serbia) Djendji Fleis	UD	8 (8)	2010-11-12	HanseDom, Stralsund, Mecklenburg-Vorpommern, Germany	
Win	10-0	(Ukraine) Oksana Romanova	UD	6 (6)	2010-06-05	Abdi Ipekçi Arena, Istanbul, Turkey	
Win	9-0	(Bulgaria) Svetla Taskova	UD	6 (6)	2010-04-09	Arena, Schwerin, Mecklenburg-Vorpommern, Germany	
Win	8-0	(Romania) Olga Harton	TKO	2 (6)	2010-01-23	Kugelbake-Halle, Cuxhaven, Niedersachsen, Germany	
Win	7-0	(Germany) Janina Bentz	UD	6 (6)	2009-10-04	Kugelbake-Halle, Cuxhaven, Niedersachsen, Germany	
Draw	6-0	(Germany) Raja Amasheh	PTS	4 (4)	2008-11-29	Rheinstrandhalle, Karlsruhe, Baden-Württemberg, Germany	
Win	6-0	(Ukraine) Nataliya Bermas	UD	4 (4)	2008-05-03	Hanns-Martin-Schleyer-Halle, Stuttgart, Baden-Württemberg, Germany	
Win	5-0	(Romania) Roxana Tenea	TKO	3 (4)	2008-02-09	Rheinstetten, Baden-Württemberg, Germany	
Win	4-0	(Poland) Renata Depciyh	TKO	3 (4)	2007-11-17	Bordelandhalle, Magdeburg, Sachsen-Anhalt, Germany	
Win	3-0	(Bulgaria) Albena Atseva	TKO	2 (4)	2007-09-30	Blautal Center, Ulm, Baden-Württemberg, Germany	
Win	2-0	(France) Elsa Capell	UD	4 (4)	2007-09-01	Europa Platz, Karlsruhe, Baden-Württemberg, Germany	
Win	1-0	(Germany) Michaela Rost	UD	4 (4)	2007-08-04	Marktplatz, Karlsruhe, Baden-Württemberg, Germany	Professional debut.

== Titles ==
=== Amateur boxing ===
2007

- Maj Boxing Cup (48 kg): 2nd

2006

- Germany International Amateur Boxing Championships (48 kg): 1st
- Germany International Amateur Boxing Championships (48 kg):1st
- Bourges - 3 Countries Tournament (48 kg): 1st
- Poland vs Germany Tournament (48 kg): 1st
- BC München Boxing Tournament (49 kg): 1st

2005

- Germany International Amateur Boxing Championships (48 kg): 1st

2004

- Germany Amateur Boxing Championships (50 kg): 3rd
- South Germany Amateur Boxing Championships (52 kg): 2nd
- Württemberg Regional Amateur Championships (52 kg): 1st
