= Seniesa Estrada =

American boxer (born 1992)

Personal information
- Nickname: Super Bad
- Born: Seniesa Carmen Estrada; June 26, 1992 (age 34) Los Angeles, California, U.S.
- Height: 5 ft 2 in (157 cm)
- Weight: Mini flyweight; Light flyweight; Flyweight

Boxing career
- Reach: 63 in (160 cm)
- Stance: Orthodox

Boxing record
- Total fights: 26
- Wins: 26
- Win by KO: 9

Seniesa Carmen Estrada (/sɪˈniːsə/; born June 26, 1992) is an American former professional boxer who won the WBA female minimumweight title in March 2021, the WBC and Ring female minimumweight titles in March 2023, and the IBF and WBO female minimumweight titles in March 2024. On March 29, 2024, she became the undisputed female minimumweight champion of the world. She previously held the WBC Silver female light flyweight title from 2018 until 2021, and the WBA female interim flyweight title from 2019 to 2020. She has the record for the fastest knockout in female boxing at seven seconds of the first round. Estrada is a member of the International Women's Boxing Hall of Fame.

== Early life ==
Hailing from East Los Angeles, Estrada is of Mexican descent and started boxing at the age of eight.

== Professional career ==
Estrada won the vacant WBC female Silver light flyweight title with a fourth-round stoppage success against Debora Rengifo at Plaza de Toros Calafia, Mexicali, Mexico, on 17 November 2018.

She became the interim WBA flyweight title holder with a technical decision win over Marlen Esparza at MGM Grand Garden Arena, Paradise, Nevada, on 2 November 2019. The fight was stopped on the advice of the ringside doctor before the start of the final round due to a serious cut on Esparza's forehead caused by an accidental clash of heads with Estrada taking the victory by virtue of being ahead on all three judges' scorecards at that stage.

On July 24, 2020, Estrada scored the fastest knockout in women's boxing history, stopping 42-year-old Miranda Adkins, who came in as a late replacement of an injured Jacky Calvo, just seven seconds into the first round of their scheduled eight round contest at Fantasy Springs Resort Casino, Indio, California.

Estrada won her first full world title when she defeated WBA female minimumweight champion Anabel Ortiz by unanimous decision at Dickies Arena, Fort Worth, Texas, on 21 March 2021.

She became a two-weight world champion in her next fight by dethroning WBO female junior flyweight title holder Tenkai Tsunami via unanimous decision at Banc of California Stadium, Los Angeles, on 9 July 2021.

Estrada was named WBA Female Boxer of the Year for 2021. In 2022, she signed a multi-year promotional contract with Top Rank.

Estrada became a unified world champion on March 25, 2023, by adding the WBC female minimumweight title to her WBA crown with a unanimous decision victory over Tina Rupprecht at Save Mart Center, Fresno, California. She also claimed the inaugural Ring female strawweight title thanks to this win.

On March 29, 2024 at the Desert Diamond Arena in Glendale, Arizona, Estrada defeated IBF and WBO champion Yokasta Valle by unanimous decision to take the undisputed minimumweight title.

Estrada announced her retirement from professional boxing on October 23, 2024.

In October 2025, she was named among the inductees for the 2026 International Women's Boxing Hall of Fame class.

== Professional boxing record ==
26 fights	26 wins	0 losses
By knockout	9	0
By decision	17	0

No.	Result	Record	Opponent	Type	Round, time	Date	Location	Notes
26	Win	26–0	Yokasta Valle	UD	10	Mar 29, 2024	Desert Diamond Arena, Glendale, Arizona, U.S.	Retained WBA female and WBC female minimumweight titles; Won IBF female and WBO female minimumweight titles
25	Win	25–0	Leonela Paola Yúdica	UD	10	Jul 28, 2023	Palms Casino Resort, Paradise Nevada, U.S.	Retained WBA female and WBC female minimumweight titles
24	Win	24–0	Tina Rupprecht	UD	10	Mar 25, 2023	Save Mart Center, Fresno, California, U.S.	Retained WBA female minimumweight title; Won WBC female minimumweight title
23	Win	23–0	Jazmin Gala Villarino	UD	10	Nov 12, 2022	Palms Casino Resort, Paradise, Nevada, U.S.	Retained WBA female minimumweight title
22	Win	22–0	Maria Micheo Santizo	KO	4 (10), 1:51	Dec 18, 2021	AT&T Center, San Antonio, Texas, U.S.	Retained WBA female minimumweight title
21	Win	21–0	Tenkai Tsunami	UD	10	Jul 9, 2021	Banc of California Stadium, Los Angeles, California, U.S.	Won WBO female junior flyweight title
20	Win	20–0	Anabel Ortiz	UD	10	Mar 20, 2021	Dickies Arena, Fort Worth, Texas, U.S.	Won WBA female minimumweight title
19	Win	19–0	Miranda Adkins	KO	1 (8), 0:07	Jul 24, 2020	Fantasy Springs Resort Casino, Indio, California, U.S.	Retained WBC Silver female light flyweight title
18	Win	18–0	Marlen Esparza	TD	9 (10), 2:00	Nov 2, 2019	MGM Grand Garden Arena, Paradise, Nevada, U.S.	Won vacant WBA interim female flyweight title; Unanimous TD: Esparza cut from an accidental head clash
17	Win	17–0	Gretchen Abaniel	RTD	4 (10), 2:00	Jun 13, 2019	The Avalon, Los Angeles, California, U.S.	Retained WBC Silver female light flyweight title
16	Win	16–0	Yenifer Leon	RTD	5 (10), 2:00	Feb 23, 2019	Auditorio Fausto Gutierrez Moreno, Tijuana, Mexico	Retained WBC Silver female light flyweight title
15	Win	15–0	Debora Rengifo	TKO	4 (10), 1:59	Nov 17, 2018	Plaza de Toros Calafia, Mexicali, Mexico	Won vacant WBC Silver female light flyweight title
14	Win	14–0	Jhosep Vizcaíno	KO	3 (8), 0:20	Jul 13, 2018	The Novo at L.A. Live, Los Angeles, California, U.S.	
13	Win	13–0	Amarilis Adorno	TKO	3 (6), 0:38	May 4, 2018	StubHub Center, Carson, California, U.S.	
12	Win	12–0	Sonia Osorio	UD	8	Mar 16, 2018	Belasco Theatre, Los Angeles, California, U.S.	
11	Win	11–0	Anahí Torres	UD	8	Sep 9, 2017	StubHub Center, Carson, California, U.S.	
10	Win	10–0	Aracely Palacios	UD	6	Jul 21, 2017	M3 Anaheim Event Center, Anaheim, California, U.S.	
9	Win	9–0	Rachel Sazoff	KO	1 (4), 0:48	Jun 22, 2017	Exchange L.A., Los Angeles, California, U.S.	
8	Win	8–0	Nancy Franco	UD	8	Sep 10, 2016	The Forum, Inglewood, California, U.S.	
7	Win	7–0	Cristina Fuentes	UD	6	Jun 3, 2016	Belasco Theatre, Los Angeles, California, U.S.	
6	Win	6–0	Selene Lopez	UD	6	Apr 23, 2016	The Forum, Inglewood, California, U.S.	
5	Win	5–0	Maria Andaverde	UD	4	Aug 27, 2015	The Hangar, Costa Mesa, California, U.S.	
4	Win	4–0	Carley Batey	UD	6	May 16, 2015	The Forum, Inglewood, California, U.S.	
3	Win	3–0	Blanca Raymundo	TKO	2 (4)	Mar 14, 2014	Marconi Automative Museum, Tustin, California, U.S.	
2	Win	2–0	Blanca Raymundo	UD	4	Jul 1, 2011	Fantasy Springs Resort Casino, Indio, California, U.S.	
1	Win	1–0	Maria Ruiz	UD	4	May 13, 2011	Chumash Casino Resort, Santa Ynez, California, U.S.	

== See also ==
- List of female boxers

Sporting positions
Regional boxing titles
Vacant Title last held by Ana Arrazola	WBC Silver female light-flyweight champion November 17, 2018 – 2021; Vacated	Vacant Title next held by Kim Clavel
World boxing titles
Vacant Title last held by Irma Sánchez	WBA female flyweight champion Interim title November 2, 2019 – 2019; Vacated	Vacant Title next held by Eva Guzman
Preceded by Anabel Ortiz	WBA female mini-flyweight champion March 20, 2021 – October 23, 2024	Incumbent
Preceded by Tenkai Tsunami	WBO female light-flyweight champion July 9, 2021 – 2021; Vacated	Vacant Title next held by Evelyn Nazarena Bermúdez
Preceded by Tina Rupprecht	WBC female mini-flyweight champion March 25, 2023 – October 23, 2024	Succeeded by Vacant
Inaugural champion	The Ring female mini-flyweight champion March 25, 2023 – October 23, 2024	Succeeded by Vacant
Preceded by Yokasta Valle	IBF female mini-flyweight champion March 29, 2024 – October 23, 2024	Succeeded by Vacant
Preceded by Yokasta Valle	WBO female mini-flyweight champion March 29, 2024 – October 23, 2024	Succeeded by Vacant
Inaugural champion	Undisputed female mini-flyweight champion March 29, 2024 – October 23, 2024	Succeeded by Vacant
