= Estefany Alegria =

Mexican boxer (born 2004)

Personal information
- Born: Estefany Guadalupe Alegria Osorio; November 29, 2004 (age 21) Guadalajara, Jalisco, Mexico
- Height: 5 ft 1 in (155 cm)
- Weight: Mini flyweight; Light flyweight

Boxing career
- Stance: Orthodox

Boxing record
- Total fights: 16
- Wins: 15
- Win by KO: 4
- Losses: 1

Estefany Guadalupe Alegria Osorio (born November 29, 2004) is a Mexican professional boxer. She has been unified female light-flyweight world champion since June 2026.

== Professional career ==
Alegria turned professional in 2021. She compiled a record of 14-1, including winning the WBC Silver female light-flyweight title, before challenging and defeating WBA, IBF and WBO female light-flyweight champion Evelin Nazarena Bermúdez by unanimous decision at Caribe Royale Orlando in Orlando, Florida, United States, on June 13, 2026.

== Professional boxing record ==
16 fights	15 wins	1 loss
By knockout	4	0
By decision	11	1

No.	Result	Record	Opponent	Type	Round, time	Date	Location	Notes
16	Win	15–1	Evelin Nazarena Bermúdez	UD	10	Jun 13, 2026	Caribe Royale Orlando, Orlando, Florida, U.S.	Won WBA, IBF and WBO female light-flyweight titles
15	Win	14–1	Danna Paola Alaniz Cid	UD	10	Mar 21, 2026	Gómez Palacio, Mexico	Won vacant WBC Silver female light-flyweight title
14	Win	13–1	Angela Stephania Nolasco Galindo	UD	10	Mar 22, 2025	Cuantas Pendientes II, Cabo San Lucas, Mexico	
13	Win	12–1	Melanie Fernanda Sarmiento Minor	UD	10	Dec 20, 2024	Guadalajara, Mexico	
12	Loss	11–1	Melanie Fernanda Sarmiento Minor	UD	8	Oct 25, 2024	Deportivo Xochimilco, Mexico City, Mexico	
11	Win	11–0	Sandra Paola Chairez	TKO	4 (6), 1:32	Apr 19, 2024	Los Mochis, Mexico	
10	Win	10–0	Tania Itzel Garcia Hernandez	UD	10	Oct 28, 2023	Guadalajara, Mexico	
9	Win	9–0	Linda Contreras Ibarra	UD	10	Aug 26, 2023	Coquimatlán, Mexico	
8	Win	8–0	Aline Mayblee Gonzalez Pardo	UD	6	Mar 25, 2023	El Domo Del Code Jalisco, Guadalajara, Mexico	
7	Win	7–0	Luz Elena Aguilar Ventura	UD	10	Nov 4, 2022	Arena Jalisco, Guadalajara, Mexico	
6	Win	6–0	Guadalupe Ibarra Segovia	TKO	4 (4), 1:53	Jul 9, 2022	UniDep Gustavo Vazquez Montes, Coquimatlán, Mexico	
5	Win	5–0	Barbara Martinez Munoz	TKO	6 (6), 0:21	Apr 2, 2022	PALCCO, Zapopan, Mexico	
4	Win	4–0	Graciela Cortes Aguilar	UD	6	Feb 23, 2022	Arena Zonkeys, Tijuana, Mexico	
3	Win	3–0	Marlen Sandoval Gutierrez	TKO	5 (6)	Dec 4, 2021	Arena Coliseo, Guadalajara, Mexico	
2	Win	2–0	Maria Martinez Sandoval	UD	6	Jun 26, 2021	Deportivo Rio Grande, El Salto, Mexico	
1	Win	1–0	Maria Cruz Sumano	UD	4	Mar 13, 2021	Hacienda De San Andres, Magdalena, Mexico	

== See also ==
- List of female boxers

Sporting positions
Regional boxing titles
Vacant Title last held by Leonela Paola Yúdica	WBC Silver light-flyweight champion March 21, 2026 – June 13, 2026; Won world title	Vacant
World boxing titles
Preceded by Evelin Nazarena Bermúdez	WBA light-flyweight champion June 13, 2026 – present	Incumbent
Preceded by Evelin Nazarena Bermúdez	IBF light-flyweight champion June 13, 2026 – present	Incumbent
Preceded by Evelin Nazarena Bermúdez	WBO light-flyweight champion June 13, 2026 – present	Incumbent
