= Gabriela Timar =

Romanian boxer (born 1986)

Personal information
- Nickname: Balboa
- Born: 7 November 1986 (age 39) Cisnădie, Romania
- Weight: Atomweight; Mini flyweight; Light flyweight

Boxing career
- Stance: Southpaw

Boxing record
- Total fights: 18
- Wins: 16
- Win by KO: 3
- Losses: 2

Gabriela Timar (born 7 November 1986) is a Romanian professional boxer.

== Professional career ==
Timar turned professional in 2018 & compiled a record of 15–2 before facing Japanese boxer Marina Loreto for the vacant WBO atomweight title. Timar would go onto win via majority decision.

== Professional boxing record ==
18 fights	16 wins	2 losses
By knockout	3	0
By decision	13	2

No.	Result	Record	Opponent	Type	Round, time	Date	Location	Notes
18	Win	16–2	Marina Loreto	MD	10	2025-12-26	Kursaal, Bern, Switzerland	Won vacant WBO atomweight title
17	Win	15–2	Johana Zuniga	UD	10	2025-09-27	Theater Basel, Basel, Switzerland	
16	Win	14–2	Erika Bolivar	UD	10	2025-04-19	Klingentalturnhalle, Basel, Switzerland	
15	Win	13–2	Yoselin Fernandez	UD	10	2024-12-26	Kursaal, Bern, Switzerland	Won vacant WBO International mini-flyweight title
14	Win	12–2	Kanyarat Nunoi	TKO	5 (10), 0:35	2024-09-28	Theater Basel, Basel, Switzerland	
13	Loss	11–2	Tania Itzel Garcia Hernandez	UD	10	2024-06-15	Klingentalturnhalle, Basel, Switzerland	
12	Win	11–1	Sarafina Bela	UD	10	2024-03-29	Bern Theatre, Bern, Switzerland	
11	Win	10–1	Pimchanok Thepjanda	UD	10	2023-12-26	Kursaal, Bern, Switzerland	Won vacant IBO Inter-Continental light-flyweight title
10	Win	9–1	Giorgia Scolastri	MD	10	2023-04-14	Volkshaus, Basel, Switzerland	Won vacant European light-flyweight title
9	Win	8–1	Saowaluk Nareepangsri	UD	8	2022-12-26	Kursaal, Bern, Switzerland	
8	Win	7–1	Judit Hachbold	UD	8	2022-09-24	Klingentalturnhalle, Basel, Switzerland	
7	Loss	6–1	Cassandra Crevecoeur	UD	10	2022-05-06	Salle Edgar-Quinet, Calais, France	For vacant European light-flyweight title
6	Win	6–0	Klaudia Ferenczi	UD	8	2021-05-29	Klingentalturnhalle, Basel, Switzerland	
5	Win	5–0	Cristina Busuioc	UD	6	2021-03-20	Klingentalturnhalle, Basel, Switzerland	
4	Win	4–0	Dariel Aleksandra Simova	TKO	4 (6), 1:15	2020-12-19	Klingentalturnhalle, Basel, Switzerland	
3	Win	3–0	Teona Pirosmanashvili	TKO	6 (6), 1:07	2019-12-14	Markthalle, Basel, Switzerland	
2	Win	2–0	Andrea Jenei	UD	6	2019-10-12	Museum Tinguely, Basel, Switzerland	
1	Win	1–0	Roz Mari Silyanova	SD	4	2018-12-08	Markthalle, Basel, Switzerland	

== See also ==
- List of female boxers
- List of southpaw stance boxers

Sporting positions
Regional boxing titles
Vacant Title last held by Cassandra Crevecoeur	European light-flyweight champion 14 April 2023 – 2024; Vacated	Vacant Title next held by Silvia Bignami
New title	IBO Inter-Continental light-flyweight champion 26 December 2023 – 2024; Vacated	Vacant
Vacant Title last held by Miriam Anda	WBO International mini-flyweight champion 26 December 2024 – 2025; Vacated	Vacant
World boxing titles
Vacant Title last held by Tina Rupprecht	WBO atomweight champion 26 December 2025 – present	Incumbent
