= List of WBO female world champions =

This is a list of WBO world champions, showing every world champion certified by the World Boxing Organization (WBO). The WBO is one of the four major governing bodies in professional boxing, and has awarded world championships in 17 different weight classes since 1989.

Boxers who won the title but were stripped due to the title bout being overturned to a no contest are not listed.

Stand: March 6, 2025.

Current champion
Most consecutive title defenses

^{r} – Champion relinquished title.
^{s} – Champion stripped of title.

== Atomweight ==
No.	Name	Duration of reign	Defences
1	(Japan) Nao Ikeyama	17 May 2014 — 29 Jul 2018	6
2	(Japan) Mika Iwakawa	29 Jul 2018 — 25 Feb 2022	1
3	(Japan) Nanae Suzuki	25 Feb 2022 — 1 Sep 2022	0
4	(Japan) Yuko Kuroki	1 Sep 2022 — 12 Jan 2024	2
5	(Japan) Eri Matsuda	12 Jan 2024 — 23 Nov 2024	0
6	(Germany) Tina Rupprecht	23 Nov 2024 — Oct 2025^{r}	1
7	(Romania) Gabriela Timar	26 Dec 2025 — present	0

== Mini flyweight ==
No.	Name	Duration of reign	Defences
1	(Thailand) Teeraporn Pannimit	2 Apr 2010 — 2011^{s}	1
2	(Thailand) Teeraporn Pannimit (2)	25 Apr 2012 — 28 Jun 2012	0
3	(South Korea) Hong Su-yun	28 Jun 2012 — 9 Feb 2014	2
4	(Japan) Mako Yamada	9 Feb 2014 — 31 May 2014^{s}	0
Yamada submitted a retirement notification to the Japanese Boxing Commission on 31 May 2014. The belt was vacated on the same day.
5	(Japan) Kumiko Seeser Ikehara	20 Sep 2014 — 13 Dec 2016^{r}	4
Ikehara retired from professional competition on 13 December 2016
6	(Japan) Kayoko Ebata	19 May 2017 — 1 Dec 2018	1
7	(Japan) Etsuko Tada	1 Dec 2018 — 28 Mar 2019^{r}	0
Tada vacated the title on 28 March 2019, as she intended to move up to minimumweight.
8	(Japan) Kasumi Saeki	27 Apr 2019 — 2019^{r}	0
Saeki vacated the title, for undisclosed reasons, on 18 December 2019.
9	(Japan) Etsuko Tada (2)	3 Dec 2020 — 23 Oct 2021	0
10	(Vietnam) Nguyễn Thị Thu Nhi	23 Oct 2021 — 8 Sep 2022	0
11	(Costa Rica) Yokasta Valle	8 Sep 2022 — 29 Mar 2024	3
12	(United States) Seniesa Estrada	29 Mar 2024 — 23 Oct 2024^{r}	0
Estrada announced her retirement from the sport on 23 October 2024.
13	(Germany) Sarah Bormann	14 Dec 2024 — present	2

== Junior flyweight ==
No.	Name	Duration of reign	Defences
1	(Argentina) Yésica Bopp	6 Nov 2009 — 2015^{s}	12
2	(South Korea) Eun Hye Lee	29 Sep 2015 — 1 Jun 2016^{s}	0
Hye Lee was stripped of her title on 1 June 2016, as she failed to make a title defense in the mandated time frame.
3	(Australia) Louisa Hawton	20 Aug 2016 — 2017^{r}	0
Hawton vacated her title in early 2017, in order to move down to atomweight.
4	(South Korea) Hong Su-yun	14 May 2017 — 16 Jul 2017^{s}	0
Su-yun vacated the title on 26 July 2017, after retiring from professional competition.
5	(Japan) Naoko Fujioka	1 Dec 2017 — 11 Dec 2017^{r}	0
Fujioka vacated the title on 11 December 2017, to focus on defending her WBA light flyweight championship.
6	(Japan) Tenkai Tsunami	8 Mar 2018 — 9 Jul 2021	4
7	(United States) Seniesa Estrada	9 Jul 2021 — 2022^{v}	0
8	(Argentina) Evelyn Nazarena Bermúdez	26 Mar 2022 — 26 Nov 2022	1
9	(Costa Rica) Yokasta Valle	26 Nov 2022 — 2023^{v}	0
9	(Argentina) Evelyn Nazarena Bermúdez (2)	10 Mar 2023 — Jun 13, 2026	5
10	(Mexico) Estefany Alegria	Jun 13, 2026 — present	0

== Flyweight ==
No.	Name	Duration of reign	Defences
1	(Germany) Susi Kentikian	10 Oct 2009 — 16 May 2012	3
2	(United States) Melissa McMorrow	16 May 2012 — 2014^{s}	2
3	(Argentina) Yésica Bopp	26 Apr 2014 — 2014^{r}	0
4	(Mexico) Kenia Enríquez	21 Nov 2014 — 28 Feb 2015	0
5	(United States) Melissa McMorrow (2)	28 Feb 2015 — 2016^{s}	0
6	(Japan) Nana Nogami	9 Oct 2016 — 29 Apr 2017	0
7	(Mexico) Monserrat Alarcón	29 Apr 2017 — 17 Feb 2018	0
8	(Mexico) Arely Muciño	17 Feb 2018 — 29 Jul 2019^{s}	2
Muciño was stripped of her title on 29 July 2019, as she was unable to make a defense due to an ankle injury sustained in a car crash.
9	(United Kingdom) Nicola Adams — Interim Champion since 6 October 2018, elevated to regular champion	29 Jul 2019 — 6 Nov 2019^{r}	1
Adams retired from professional competition on 6 November 2019, after sustaining an eye injury in a fight.
10	(Argentina) Débora Anahí López	20 Dec 2019 — 19 Mar 2022	1
11	(Argentina) Tamara Elisabet DeMarco	19 Mar 2022 — 18 Jun 2022	0
12	(Argentina) Gabriela Celeste Alaniz	18 Jun 2022 — 8 Jul 2023	1
13	(United States) Marlen Esparza	8 Jul 2023 — 26 Apr 2024^{s}	0
14	(Argentina) Gabriela Celeste Alaniz (2)	27 Apr 2024 — 2 Nov 2024	0
15	(United States) Gabriela Fundora	2 Nov 2024 — present	3

== Junior bantamweight ==
No.	Name	Duration of reign	Defences
1	(Argentina) Carolina Duer	17 Dec 2010 — 26 Jul 2013^{r}	6
Duer vacated her title on 26 July 2013, after capturing a WBO championship a weight class up.
2	(Argentina) Daniela Romina Bermúdez	4 Jan 2014 — 2017^{r}	4
3	(Germany) Raja Amasheh	10 Mar 2018 — 2019^{s}	1
4	(Puerto Rico) Amanda Serrano	18 Jan 2019 — 2019^{r}	0
5	(Japan) Miyo Yoshida	19 Jun 2019 — 13 Dec 2020	1
6	(Japan) Tomoko Okuda	13 Dec 2020 — 29 Jun 2021	0
7	(Japan) Miyo Yoshida (2)	29 Jun 2021 — 30 May 2022	0
8	(Japan) Tamao Ozawa	30 May 2022 — 27 Oct 2022	0
Ozawa vacated her title on 27 October 2022, to focus on her family life.
9	(Japan) Mizuki Hiruta	1 Dec 2022 — present	7

== Bantamweight ==
No.	Name	Duration of reign	Defences
1	(United States) Kaliesha West	18 Sep 2010 — 2012^{r}	3
2	(Argentina) Daniela Romina Bermúdez	31 May 2013 — 2013^{r}	0
3	(Argentina) Carolina Duer	26 Jul 2013 — 2015^{s}	2
4	(Argentina) Mayra Alejandra Gómez — Interim champion, elevated to full champion 10 February 2015	10 Feb 2015 — 2015^{s}	1
5	(Japan) Naoko Fujioka	19 Oct 2015 — 2016^{s}	1
6	(Argentina) Sabrina Maribel Pérez	26 Nov 2016 — 2017^{r}	0
7	(Puerto Rico) Amanda Serrano	22 Apr 2017 — 2017^{r}	0
8	(Argentina) Daniela Romina Bermúdez (2)	20 Oct 2017 — Dec 2020^{r}	5
9	(Denmark) Dina Thorslund	25 Jun 2021 – Jun 6, 2025^{r}	7
10	(Australia) Cherneka Johnson	11 Jul 2025 – present	1

== Junior featherweight ==
No.	Name	Duration of reign	Defences
1	(United States) Ana Julaton	4 Dec 2009 — 2010^{s}	0
2	(United States) Ana Julaton (2)	30 Jun 2010 — 16 Mar 2012	2
3	(Argentina) Yésica Marcos — Interim champion since 8 October 2011, beat Julaton for full title 16 March 2012	16 Mar 2012 — 2013^{s}	2
4	(Argentina) Marcela Acuña	25 Oct 2013 — 2016^{s}	2
5	(Argentina) Sabrina Maribel Pérez – Interim champion, elevated to full champion 10 May 2016.	10 May 2016 — 2016^{s}	0
6	(Puerto Rico) Amanda Serrano	18 Oct 2016 — 2018^{r}	2
7	(Argentina) Daniela Romina Bermúdez	13 Apr 2018 — 2018^{r}	0
8	(Denmark) Dina Thorslund	25 Aug 2018 — 2021^{r}	3
9	(France) Ségolène Lefebvre	20 Nov 2021 – 2021^{r}	1
10	(Argentina) Débora Dionicius	23 Dec 2022 – 29 Apr 2023	0
11	(France) Ségolène Lefebvre (2)	29 Apr 2023 – 13 Apr 2024	1
12	(United Kingdom) Ellie Scotney	13 Apr 2024 – May 12, 2026^{r}	1

== Featherweight ==
No.	Name	Duration of reign	Defences
1	(Germany) Ina Menzer	10 Oct 2009 – 3 Jul 2010	1
2	(Canada) Jeannine Garside	3 Jul 2010 – 2011^{s}	0
3	(Argentina) Alejandra Oliveras	5 Jan 2012 – 2014^{s}	5
4	(Puerto Rico) Amanda Serrano	17 Feb 2016 – 2016^{r}	1
5	(Puerto Rico) Cindy Serrano	10 Dec 2016 – 2018^{r}	1
6	(United States) Heather Hardy	27 Oct 2018 – 13 Sep 2019	0
7	(Puerto Rico) Amanda Serrano (2) (elevated to Super champion on 19 Feb 2020)	13 Sep 2019 – present	7

== Junior lightweight ==
No.	Name	Duration of reign	Defences
1	(Germany) Ramona Kühne	4 Jun 2010 – 2018^{s}	8
2	(Poland) Ewa Brodnicka – Interim champion since 13 May 2017, elevated to full champion	22 Feb 2018 – 30 Oct 2020^{s}	5
Brodnicka was stripped of her title on 30 October 2020, after failing to make weight for the fight with Mikaela Mayer.
3	(United States) Mikaela Mayer	31 Oct 2020 – 15 Oct 2022	3
4	(United States) Alycia Baumgardner	15 Oct 2022 – present	3

== Lightweight ==
No.	Name	Duration of reign	Defences
1	(Australia) Erin McGowan	9 Oct 2010 – 2011^{s}	0
2	(Colombia) Enis Pacheco	16 Mar 2012 – 14 Jun 2013	2
3	(Argentina) María Maderna	14 Jun 2013 – 15 Aug 2014	3
4	(Puerto Rico) Amanda Serrano	15 Aug 2014 – 2015^{s}	0
5	(Argentina) Yohana Alfonzo	24 Sep 2015 – 2017^{s}	3
6	(Brazil) Rose Volante	22 Dec 2017 – 15 Mar 2019	2
7	(Republic of Ireland) Katie Taylor	15 Mar 2019 – 5 Jan 2024^{r}	8
Taylor vacated the title on 5 January 2024 to concentrate on defending her undisputed junior-welterweight/super-lightweight championships.
8	(United Kingdom) Rhiannon Dixon	13 Apr 2024 – 28 Sep 2024	0
9	(United Kingdom) Terri Harper	28 Sep 2024 – 5 Apr 2026	1
9	(United Kingdom) Caroline Dubois	5 Apr 2026 – present	0

== Junior welterweight ==
No.	Name	Duration of reign	Defences
1	(Argentina) Fernanda Alegre	3 Dec 2010 – 2015^{s}	10
2	(Argentina) Fernanda Alegre (2)	25 Apr 2015 – 2016^{r}	1
3	(Argentina) Adela Celeste Peralta	14 May 2016 – 4 Nov 2016	0
4	(Argentina) Ana Esteche	4 Nov 2016 – 2017^{s}	1
5	(Puerto Rico) Amanda Serrano	8 Sep 2018 – 2018^{r}	0
6	(Greece) Christina Linardatou	24 Mar 2019 – 2 Nov 2019	1
7	(Republic of Ireland) Katie Taylor	2 Nov 2019 – 2019^{r}	0
8	(Greece) Christina Linardatou (2)	8 Feb 2020 – 2021^{r}	0
9	(United States) Kali Reis	19 Nov 2021 – 2021^{r}	0
10	(United Kingdom) Chantelle Cameron	5 Nov 2022 – 25 Nov 2023	1
11	(Republic of Ireland) Katie Taylor (2)	25 Nov 2023 – present	2

== Welterweight ==
No.	Name	Duration of reign	Defences
1	(Costa Rica) Hanna Gabriels	19 Dec 2009 – 2010^{r}	0
2	(Norway) Cecilia Brækhus	15 May 2010 – 15 Aug 2020	21
3	(United States) Jessica McCaskill	15 Aug 2020 – 2023^{r}	3
4	(United Kingdom) Sandy Ryan	22 Apr 2023 – 27 Sep 2024	2
5	(United States) Mikaela Mayer	27 Sep 2024 – Nov 2026^{r}	1
6	(United Kingdom) Lauren Price	20 Nov 2026 – present	0

== Junior middleweight ==
No.	Name	Duration of reign	Defences
1	(Costa Rica) Hanna Gabriels	29 May 2010 – 28 Feb 2013	3
2	(Dominican Republic) Oxandia Castillo	28 Feb 2013 – 2014^{s}	0
3	(Costa Rica) Hanna Gabriels (2)	20 Dec 2014 – 2018^{s}	4
4	(United States) Claressa Shields	10 Jan 2020 – 26 Nov 2021^{v}	1
5	(United Kingdom) Natasha Jonas	19 Feb 2022 – 2023^{v}	2
6	(Slovenia) Ema Kozin	18 Nov 2023 – 4 Oct 2025	1
7	(Norway) Cecilia Brækhus	4 Oct 2025 – 4 Oct 2025^{v}	0
8	(United States) Mikaela Mayer	30 Oct 2025 – 14 Jan 2026^{v}	0
9	(United Kingdom) Chantelle Cameron	5 Apr 2026 – present	0

== Middleweight ==
No.	Name	Duration of reign	Defences
1	(Germany) Christina Hammer	23 Oct 2010 – 13 Apr 2019	12
2	(United States) Claressa Shields Super champion since 8 July 2019	13 Apr 2019 – Sep 2020	0
3	(United Kingdom) Savannah Marshall	31 Oct 2020 – 15 Oct 2022	3
4	(United States) Claressa Shields (2)	15 Oct 2022 – 2025^{s}	1
5	(Australia) Desley Robinson	11 Apr 2025 — present	1

== Super middleweight ==
No.	Name	Duration of reign	Defences
1	(Germany) Christina Hammer	4 May 2013 – 2013^{r}	0
2	(Belgium) Femke Hermans	12 May 2018 – 2018^{s}	0
3	(United States) Franchón Crews-Dezurn	14 Sep 2019 – 1 Jul 2023	2
4	(United Kingdom) Savannah Marshall	1 Jul 2023 – 2024^{s}	0
5	(United States) Shadasia Green	15 Nov 2024 – 17 Apr 2026	2
6	(New Zealand) Lani Daniels	17 Apr 2026 — present	0

== Light heavyweight ==
No.	Name	Duration of reign	Defences
1	(New Zealand) Geovana Peres	30 Mar 2019 – 26 Jan 2021^{r}	1
Peres retired from professional competition on 26 January 2021.
2	(United States) Claressa Shields	27 Jul 2024 – 3 Mar 2025^{s}	0
Shields vacated her light heavyweight title while holding on to her heavyweight belt on 3 Mar 2025.

== Heavyweight ==
No.	Name	Duration of reign	Defences
1	(United States) Claressa Shields	2 Feb 2025 – present	2

== See also ==
- List of current female world boxing champions
- List of female undisputed world boxing champions
- List of WBA female world champions
- List of WBC female world champions
- List of IBF female world champions
- List of WIBO world champions
