= Yokasta Valle =

Costa Rican boxer (born 1992)

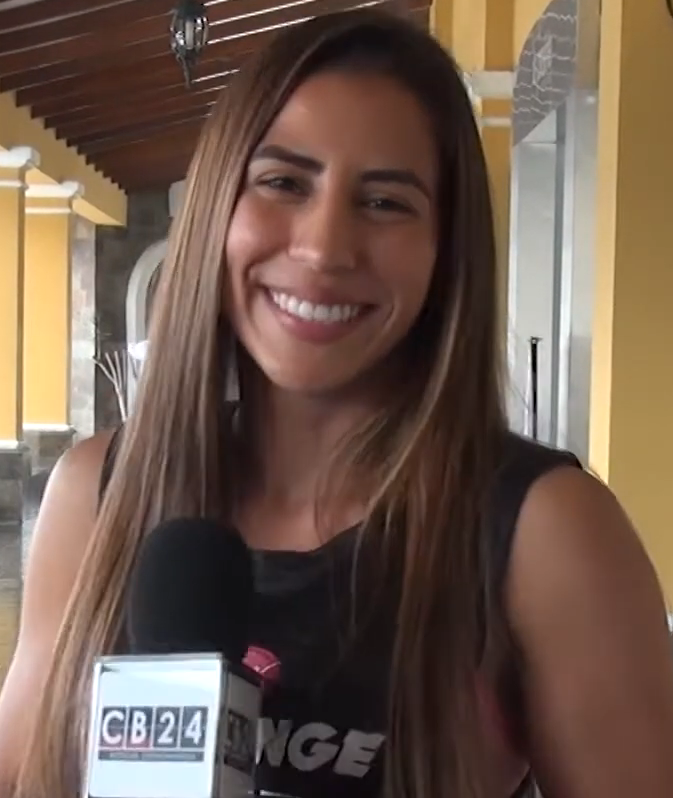
- Yokasta Valle in 2017

Personal information
- Nationality: Costa Rican
- Born: Yokasta Galeth Valle Álvarez; 28 August 1992 (age 34) Matagalpa, Nicaragua
- Height: 5 ft 4 in (163 cm)
- Weight: Atomweight; Mini-flyweight; Light-flyweight; Flyweight

Boxing career
- Reach: 62 1/2 in (159 cm)
- Stance: Orthodox

Boxing record
- Total fights: 37
- Wins: 34
- Win by KO: 10
- Losses: 4

Yokasta Galeth Valle Álvarez (born 28 August 1992) is a Nicaraguan-born Costa Rican professional boxer. She is a three-division world champion, having held the World Boxing Council (WBC) female strawweight title since November 2024. She also previously held the International Boxing Federation (IBF) female atomweight title; the unified IBF and World Boxing Organization (WBO) female mini flyweight and female light flyweight titles between 2016 and 2024.

== Early life ==
Born on 28 August 1992 in Matagalpa, Nicaragua, Valle moved to Costa Rica when she was very young. Valle holds Costa Rican nationality.

Valle started practicing volleyball, and later moved to boxing due to her father's influence. Her first fight was when she was 13 years old.

== Professional career ==
Valle debuted on 26 July 2014 in Alajuela, defeating Mexican boxer Guadalupe "La Fiera" Atilano by unanimous decision.

On 1 December 2017, Valle fought for the WBO female light flyweight title against Japanese Naoko Fujioka, but she lost by unanimous decision in ten rounds. This was also Valle's first defeat in her professional career.

In 2018, Valle was named Tina Rupprecht's rival for the vacant WBC minimumweight world championship, after reigning champion Momo Koseki retired. Valle lost against the German, in a fight taking place in Munich on 16 June 2018 by unanimous decision, this was her second career loss.

On 4 August 2019, Valle fought Joana Pastrana for the IBF mini flyweight world championship title, in a bout held at Marbella. Valle won the fight by split decision, becoming the new mini flyweight female world champion.

Valle faced the Nguyễn Thị Thu Nhi in a title unification bout on 8 September 2022. The bout headlined a DAZN broadcast card, which took place at the Ciudad Deportiva Heiner Ugalde in San José, Costa Rica. Valle won the fight by a shutout unanimous decision, with all three judges awarding all ten rounds to her.

Valle became a three-weight world champion when she defeated IBF and WBO female light-flyweight champion Evelyn Bermudez by majority decision at Dignity Health Sports Park in Carson, California, USA, on 26 November 2022.

In March 2023, Valle defeated Jessica Basulto Salazar by unanimous decision and retained her WBO and IBF minimumweight titles.

On September 16, 2023, Valle defeated Maria Micheo Santizo by unanimous decision and retained her IBF and WBO minimumweight titles.

On March 29, 2024, at the Desert Diamond Arena in Glendale, Arizona, USA, Valle lost by unanimous decision against Seniesa Estrada in a fight for the undisputed minimumweight title.

She made a winning return to the ring on 20 July 2024, stopping Ramandeep Kaur in the second round at Estadio Ricardo Saprissa Ayma, San Juan de Tibas, Costa Rica.

Valle won the WBC female strawweight title with a unanimous decision success over Elizabeth Lopez Corzo at Camara de Ganaderos, Liberia, Costa Rica, on 1 November 2024.

She defeated Marlen Esparza in a non-title flyweight contest by split decision in Cancun, Mexico, on 29 March 2025.

In August 2025, Valle signed a promotional contract with Jake Paul led Most Valuable Promotions.

Valle was scheduled to defend her WBC minimumweight title against Yadira Bustillos at the Kaseya Center in Miami, Florida, on the undercard of the Jake Paul vs. Gervonta Davis fight on 14 November 2025. However, the event was cancelled less than two weeks before it was set to take place due Davis' legal issues. The contest was rescheduled to take place at the same venue on 19 December 2025 as part of the undercard of the Jake Paul vs. Anthony Joshua fight. Valle won by majority decision with two of the ringside judges scoring the fight 98–92 and 97–93 respectively in her favour, while the third had it a 95–95 draw.

Valle challenged WBC female light-flyweight champion Lourdes Juárez at County Coliseum in El Paso, Texas, U.S., on 30 May 2026. She was knocked to the canvas in the last round, and although she recovered to finish the fight, lost via split decision with two of the ringside judges scoring the bout 98–91 and 95–94 in her opponent's favour, while the third had it a 95–94 for her.

== Professional boxing record ==
37 fights	34 wins	3 losses
By knockout	10	0
By decision	24	3

No.	Result	Record	Opponent	Type	Round, time	Date	Location	Notes
38	Loss	34–4	Lourdes Juárez	SD	10	30 May 2026	County Coliseum, El Paso, Texas, U.S	For WBC female light-flyweight title
37	Win	34–3	Yadira Bustillos	MD	10	19 Dec 2025	Kaseya Center, Miami, Florida, U.S.	Retained WBC female mini-flyweight title
36	Win	33–3	Marlen Esparza	SD	10	29 Mar 2025	Polifórum Benito Juárez, Cancún, Mexico	
35	Win	32–3	Elizabeth Lopez Corzo	UD	10	1 Nov 2024	Camara de Ganaderos, Liberia, Costa Rica	Won vacant WBC female mini-flyweight title
34	Win	31–3	Ramandeep Kaur	TKO	2 (10), 1:12	20 Jul 2024	Estadio Ricardo Saprissa Aymá, San Juan de Tibas, Costa Rica	
33	Loss	30–3	Seniesa Estrada	UD	10	29 Mar 2024	Desert Diamond Arena, Glendale, Arizona, U.S.	Lost IBF and WBO female mini-flyweight titles; For WBA, WBC and The Ring female mini-flyweight titles
32	Win	30–2	Anabel Ortiz	UD	10	4 Nov 2023	Polideportivo de Cartago, Cartago, Costa Rica	Retained IBF and WBO mini-flyweight titles
30	Win	28–2	Jessica Basulto Salazar	UD	10	25 Mar 2023	Club y Hotel Condovac La Costa, Guanacaste, Costa Rica	Retained IBF and WBO female mini-flyweight titles
29	Win	27–2	Evelyn Nazarena Bermúdez	MD	10	26 Nov 2022	Dignity Health Sports Park, Carson, California, U.S.	Won IBF and WBO female light-flyweight titles
28	Win	26–2	Nguyễn Thị Thu Nhi	UD	10	8 Sep 2022	Ciudad Deportiva Heiner Ugalde, San José, Costa Rica	Retained IBF female mini-flyweight title; Won WBO female mini-flyweight title
27	Win	25–2	Lorraine Villalobos	UD	10	11 Jun 2022	Honda Center, Anaheim, California, U.S.	Retained IBF female mini-flyweight title
26	Win	24–2	Sana Hazuki	UD	10	25 Mar 2022	Camara Ganadera de San Carlos, Alajuela, Costa Rica	Retained IBF female mini-flyweight title
25	Win	23–2	Elizabeth Lopez Corzo	UD	10	18 Dec 2021	Cuidad Deportiva Heiner Ugalde, Hatillo, Costa Rica	Retained IBF female mini-flyweight title
24	Win	22–2	Debora Rengifo	UD	10	7 Aug 2021	Oxigeno Human Playground, Heredia, Costa Rica	
23	Win	21–2	Sana Hazuki	UD	10	30 Jan 2021	Oxigeno Human Playground, Heredia, Costa Rica	Retained IBF female mini-flyweight title
22	Win	20–2	Carleans Rivas	TKO	6 (10), 1:20	8 Feb 2020	Ciudad Deportiva Heiner Ugalde, San José, Costa Rica	Retained IBF female mini-flyweight title
21	Win	19–2	Yenifer León	UD	10	9 Nov 2019	BN Arena, San José, Costa Rica	
20	Win	18–2	Joana Pastrana	SD	10	4 Aug 2019	Plaza de Toros de Puerto Banús, Marbella, Spain	Won IBF female mini-flyweight title
19	Win	17–2	Valeria Mejía	TKO	5 (10), 1:11	2 Feb 2019	BN Arena, San José, Costa Rica	
18	Win	16–2	Edith Flores	UD	8	8 Dec 2018	Gimnasio Municipal, Santo Domingo, Costa Rica	
17	Win	15–2	Luisana Bolívar	UD	10	13 Oct 2018	BN Arena, San José, Costa Rica	
16	Win	14–2	Haidde Zapa	TKO	2 (8), 1:24	23 Aug 2018	Fantastic Casino Albrook Mall, Panama City, Panama	
15	Loss	13–2	Tina Rupprecht	UD	10	16 Jun 2018	Ballhausforum, Unterschleißheim, Germany	For WBC interim female mini-flyweight title
14	Loss	13–1	Naoko Fujioka	UD	10	1 Dec 2017	Korakuen Hall, Tokyo, Japan	For vacant WBO female light-flyweight title
13	Win	13–0	Yaditza Pérez	UD	10	31 Mar 2017	Parque Central, San José, Costa Rica	
12	Win	12–0	Ana Victoria Polo	SD	10	16 Dec 2016	Parque Central, San José, Costa Rica	Won inaugural IBF female atomweight title
11	Win	11–0	Linda Vázquez	UD	8	19 Aug 2016	Gimnasio Shidokan Fitness, San Vicente, Costa Rica	
10	Win	10–0	Lorena Mendoza	UD	8	28 May 2016	Gimnasio Shidokan Fitness, San Vicente, Costa Rica	
9	Win	9–0	Guadalupe Esquivel	RTD	5 (8), 2:00	2 Apr 2016	Gimnasio Shidokan Fitness, San Vicente, Costa Rica	
8	Win	8–0	Xiomara Vilorio	RTD	2 (6), 2:00	15 Jan 2016	CIFCO, San Salvador, El Salvador	
7	Win	7–0	Blanca Rodríguez	RTD	1 (6), 2:00	19 Dec 2015	Gimnasio Boxeo Quepos, Quepos, Costa Rica	
6	Win	6–0	Xiomara Vilorio	UD	6	28 Nov 2015	Gimnasio Fite Nite, Alajuela, Costa Rica	
5	Win	5–0	Lidiette Ortiz	TKO	1 (6), 0:42	17 Oct 2015	Estadio Edgardo Baltodano Briceño, Liberia, Costa Rica	
4	Win	4–0	Yovanella Sosa	TKO	2 (4), 1:28	2 Aug 2015	Gimnasio Fite Nite, Alajuela, Costa Rica	
3	Win	3–0	Yovanella Sosa	UD	4	13 Jun 2015	Gimnasio Gabelo Conejo, Alajuela, Costa Rica	
2	Win	2–0	Francisca Viquez	TKO	3 (4), 2:00	10 Oct 2014	Gimnasio Comite Deportes de Escazu, Escazú, Costa Rica	
1	Win	1–0	Guadalupe Atilano	UD	4	26 Jul 2014	Gimnasio Fite Nite, Alajuela, Costa Rica	

== Personal life ==
Valle participated in the 2018 Costa Rican version of Dancing with the Stars.

== See also ==
- List of female boxers

Sporting positions
World boxing titles
Inaugural champion	IBF atomweight champion December 16, 2016 – 2017; Vacated	Vacant Title next held by Saemi Hanagata
Preceded by Joana Pastrana	IBF mini-flyweight champion August 4, 2019 – March 29, 2024	Succeeded by Seniesa Estrada
Preceded by Nguyễn Thị Thu Nhi	WBO mini-flyweight champion September 8, 2022 – March 29, 2024	Succeeded by Seniesa Estrada
Preceded by Evelyn Nazarena Bermúdez	IBF light-flyweight champion November 26, 2022 – 2023; Vacated	Vacant Title next held by Evelyn Nazarena Bermúdez
Preceded by Evelyn Nazarena Bermúdez	WBO light-flyweight champion November 26, 2022 – 2023; Vacated	Vacant Title next held by Evelyn Nazarena Bermúdez
Vacant Title last held by Seniesa Estrada	WBC mini-flyweight champion November 1, 2024 – present	Incumbent
