= Evelin Nazarena Bermúdez =

Argentine boxer (born 1996)

Personal information
- Nicknames: La Princesita ("The Little Princess")
- Born: April 1, 1996 (age 30) Villa Gobernador Gálvez, Santa Fe, Argentina
- Height: 5 ft 5 in (165 cm)
- Weight: Light flyweight; Super flyweight

Boxing career
- Stance: Orthodox

Boxing record
- Total fights: 24
- Wins: 22
- Win by KO: 8
- Losses: 2
- Draws: 1

Evelin Nazarena Bermúdez (born 1 April 1996) is an Argentine professional boxer She is a two-time former female light-flyweight world champion.

== Personal life ==
She is the younger sister of former three-division world champion of boxing, Daniela Romina Bermúdez.

== Professional career ==
Bermúdez made her professional debut on 22 October 2016, scoring a four-round unanimous decision (UD) victory against Adriana Moldonado at the Estadio cubierto Sub sede Cruce Alberdi in Rosario, Argentina.

After compiling a record of 9–0 (2 KOs), she defeated Vanesa Lorena Taborda on 28 September 2018 at the Olimpico Football Club in Villa Gobernador Gálvez, Argentina, capturing the vacant South American super flyweight title via UD with the scorecards reading 100–90, 100–91.5 and 100–93.

Her next fight came three months later on 29 December, moving down two weight classes to challenge IBF female junior flyweight champion Guadalupe Bautista at the Club Atlético Talleres in Villa Gobernador Gálvez. Bermúdez defeated Bautista via split decision (SD) to capture her first world title, with two judges scoring the bout 96–94 in favour of Bermúdez while the third scored it 96–94 to Bautista. Bermúdez' sister, Daniela, also became a world champion on the same card, winning the WBO female bantamweight title.

Bermudez added the WBO female light-flyweight World title to her collection with a fifth-round stoppage of Venezuela's Debora Rengifo on 26 March 2022.

She lost her titles on 26 November 2022, going down to a majority decision defeat against Yokasta Valle from Costa Rica at Dignity Health Sports Park in Carson, California, USA.

Three-weight world champion Valle opted to return to strawweight leading to Bermudez being given an immediate chance to regain both titles when she faced Mexico's Tania Enriquez at Estadio Luna Park in Buenos Aires, Argentina, on 10 March 2023. She won the fight by unanimous decision to become a two-time world champion.

Bermúdez faced WBA female light-flyweight champion Sara Bailey in a title unification at Hard Rock Hotel and Casino in Ottawa, Canada, on 20 September 2025. Having knocked her opponent to the canvas twice, she won by stoppage in the first round.

On 13 June 2026 at Caribe Royale Resort in Orlando, Florida, USA, Bermúdez lost her titles to Estefany Alegria via unanimous decision.

== Professional boxing record ==
25 fights	22 wins	2 losses
By knockout	8	0
By decision	14	2
Draws	1	

No.	Result	Record	Opponent	Type	Round, time	Date	Location	Notes
25	Loss	22–2–1	Estefany Alegria	UD	10	13 Jun 2026	Caribe Royale Resort, Orlando, Florida, U.S.	Lost IBF, WBO and WBA female light-flyweight titles
24	Win	22–1–1	Sara Bailey	TKO	1 (10)	20 Sep 2025	Hard Rock Casino, Ottawa, Ontario, Canada	Retained IBF and WBO light-flyweight titles; Won WBA female light-flyweight title
23	Win	21–1–1	Tenkai Tsunami	UD	10	8 Mar 2025	Estadio Municipal Hector Gallucci, San Lorenzo, Argentina	Retained IBF and WBO female light-flyweight titles
22	Win	20–1–1	Jessica Basulto	TKO	8 (10)	4 May 2024	Estadio Luna Park, Buenos Aires, Argentina	Retained IBF and WBO female light-flyweight titles
21	Win	19–1–1	Kim Clavel	SD	10	7 Oct 2023	Place Bell, Laval, Quebec, Canada	Retained IBF and WBO female light-flyweight titles
20	Win	18–1–1	Tania Enriquez	UD	10	10 Mar 2023	Estadio Luna Park, Buenos Aires, Argentina	Won vacant IBF and WBO female light-flyweight titles
19	Loss	17–1–1	Yokasta Valle	MD	10	26 Nov 2022	Dignity Health Sports Park, Carson, California, U.S.	Lost IBF and WBO female light-flyweight titles
18	Win	17–0–1	Yarineth Altuve	UD	10	23 Jul 2022	Estadio Municipal Héctor Galucci, San Lorenzo, Argentina	Retained IBF and WBO female light-flyweight titles
17	Win	16–0–1	Debora Rengifo	TKO	5 (10)	26 Mar 2022	Estadio Luna Park, Buenos Aires, Argentina	Retained IBF light-flyweight title; Won vacant WBO female light-flyweight title
16	Win	15–0–1	Yaditza Pérez	TKO	3 (10)	7 Jan 2022	Complejo Multifuncion, Pérez, Argentina	Retained IBF female light-flyweight title
15	Win	14–0–1	Tamara Elisabet DeMarco	TKO	9 (10)	4 Jul 2021	Complejo Deportivo Municipal Emilio A. Lotuf, Rosario, Argentina	Retained IBF female light-flyweight title
14	Win	13–0–1	Aixa Adema	UD	6	4 Dec 2020	Asociacion Bomberos Voluntarios, Zavalla, Argentina	
13	Draw	12–0–1	Silvia Torres	SD	10	6 Jul 2019	Delegacion Coyocan, Mexico City, Mexico	Retained IBF female light-flyweight title
12	Win	12–0	Luisana Bolívar	TKO	5 (10)	25 Jan 2019	Club Atlético Sportivo Matienzo, Pujato Norte, Argentina	Retained IBF female light-flyweight title
11	Win	11–0	Guadalupe Bautista	SD	10	29 Dec 2018	Club Atlético Talleres, Villa Gobernador Gálvez, Argentina	Won IBF female light-flyweight title
10	Win	10–0	Vanesa Lorena Taborda	UD	10	28 Sep 2018	Olimpico Football Club, Villa Gobernador Gálvez, Argentina	Won vacant South American female super-flyweight title
9	Win	9–0	Natalia Josefina Alderete	UD	6	24 Aug 2018	Club Huracán, Tres Arroyos, Argentina	
8	Win	8–0	Debora Vanesa Gómez	UD	6	19 May 2018	Club Union, Goya, Argentina	
7	Win	7–0	Makarena Gallestegui	UD	6	23 Feb 2018	Polideportivo Municipal, Ceibas, Argentina	
6	Win	6–0	Maria Laura Cano	UD	6	26 Jan 2018	Club Talleres, Arroyo Seco, Argentina	
5	Win	5–0	Rosa Laura Salazar	TKO	6 (6)	25 Nov 2017	Olimpico Football Club, Villa Gobernador Gálvez, Argentina	
4	Win	4–0	Marianela Soledad Ramírez	UD	4	17 Jun 2017	Club Talleres, Arroyo Seco, Argentina	
3	Win	3–0	Victoria Alexis Moreyra	UD	4	18 Mar 2017	Gimnasio Futbol Club, Vera, Argentina	
2	Win	2–0	Romina Belen Gorosito	TKO	2 (4)	23 Dec 2016	Club Atletico y Recreativo Ferrocarril, Vera, Argentina	
1	Win	1–0	Adriana Maldonado	UD	4	22 Oct 2016	Estadio cubierto Sub sede Cruce Alberdi, Rosario, Argentina	

== See also ==
- List of female boxers
- Notable boxing families

Sporting positions
Regional boxing titles
Vacant Title last held by Maria Magdalena Rivera	South American super-flyweight champion 28 September 2018 – 2021; Vacated	Vacant Title next held by Carla Ayelen Merino
World boxing titles
Preceded by Guadalupe Bautista	IBF light-flyweight champion 29 December 2018 – 26 November 2022	Succeeded by Yokasta Valle
Vacant Title last held by Seniesa Estrada	WBO light-flyweight champion 26 March 2022 – 26 November 2022	Succeeded by Yokasta Valle
Vacant Title last held by Yokasta Valle	IBF light-flyweight champion 10 March 2023 – 13 June 2026	Succeeded by Estefany Alegria Osorio
Vacant Title last held by Yokasta Valle	WBO light-flyweight champion 10 March 2023 – 13 June 2026	Succeeded by Estefany Alegria Osorio
Preceded by Sara Bailey	WBA light-flyweight champion 20 September 2025 – 13 June 2026	Succeeded by Estefany Alegria Osorio
