= Melisa Meraz =

Mexican boxer (born 1993)

Personal information
- Nicknames: La Leona ("The Lioness")
- Nationality: Mexican
- Born: Alma Melisa Meraz Rodríguez; February 2, 1993 (age 33)
- Weight: Light flyweight; Flyweight

Boxing career
- Stance: Orthodox

Boxing record
- Total fights: 17
- Wins: 11
- Win by KO: 2
- Losses: 4
- Draws: 2

Alma Melisa Meraz Rodríguez (born February 2, 1993) is a Mexican professional boxer.

== Professional career ==
Meraz turned professional in 2018. She compiled a record of 10–4–1 before facing and defeating Jacqueline Calvo, to win the WBA interim light-flyweight title.

== Professional boxing record ==
17 fights	11 wins	4 losses
By knockout	2	1
By decision	9	3
Draws	2	

No.	Result	Record	Opponent	Type	Round, time	Date	Location	Notes
17	Draw	11–4–2	Naylea Gil Sanabia	MD	8	Mar 14, 2026	Mexicali, Mexico	
16	Win	11–4–1	Jacqueline Calvo	SD	10	Sep 27, 2025	Naucalpan, Mexico	Won Interim WBA light-flyweight title
15	Loss	10–4–1	Marilyn Badillo Amaya	UD	10	Jul 27, 2024	Tlaxcala, Mexico	For WBC International flyweight title
14	Win	10–3–1	Jessica Rangel Gonzalez	UD	6	Oct 1, 2022	Mexicali, Mexico	
13	Loss	9–3–1	Karely Lopez Castro	TKO	7 (8), 1:03	Feb 26, 2022	Gimnasio De Mexicali, Mexicali, Mexico	
12	Draw	9–2–1	Luz Elena Aguilar Ventura	UD	8	Dec 11, 2021	Gimnasio De Mexicali, Mexicali, Mexico	
11	Loss	9–2	Guadalupe Bautista	MD	10	Sep 4, 2021	Auditorio PSF, Mexicali, Mexico	
10	Win	9–1	Karla Yosari Quinonez Islas	TKO	3 (6), 1:38	Apr 24, 2021	Gimnasio 686 Boxing Camp, Mexicali, Mexico	
9	Loss	8–1	Tania Enriquez	UD	6	Sep 23, 2020	Cancha Beisball IMDET, Tijuana, Mexico	
8	Win	8–0	Naylea Gil Sanabia	UD	8	Mar 13, 2020	Gimnasio De Mexicali, Mexicali, Mexico	
7	Win	7–0	Heidy Cruz	UD	6	Nov 29, 2019	Gimnasio De Mexicali, Mexicali, Mexico	
6	Win	6–0	Jazmin Valverde	MD	4	Sep 21, 2019	Auditorio PSF, Mexicali, Mexico	
5	Win	5–0	Monica Araceli Chico Murrieta	TKO	2 (4), 1:39	Jul 27, 2019	Centro De Espectáculos Rancho Grande, Mexicali, Mexico	
4	Win	4–0	Heidy Cruz	UD	4	May 25, 2019	Parque Vicente Guerrero, Mexicali, Mexico	
3	Win	3–0	Reyna Sofia Franco Cruz	SD	4	Mar 1, 2019	Centro De Espectáculos Rancho Grande, Mexicali, Mexico	
2	Win	2–0	Viridiana Perez Mendiola	UD	4	Dec 7, 2018	Esquina Food Truck, Mexicali, Mexico	
1	Win	1–0	Viridiana Valtierra	UD	4	Aug 31, 2018	Parque Vicente Guerrero, Mexicali, Mexico	

== See also ==
- List of female boxers

Sporting positions
World boxing titles
Vacant Title last held by Yesica Nery Plata	WBA light-flyweight champion Interim title September 27, 2025 – present	Incumbent
