= Zamorano (disambiguation) =

Zamorano may refer to:

== People ==
- África Zamorano (born 1998), Spanish swimmer
- Agustín V. Zamorano (1798–1842), Mexican Governor of Alta California
- Andrew Zamorano (born 1995), Uruguayan-Chilean footballer
- Armando Zamorano (born 1993), Mexican footballer
- Camila Zamorano (born 2007), Mexican boxer
- Claudio Zamorano (born 1998), Chilean footballer
- Coalo Zamorano (born 1972), Mexican singer, musician, composer and record producer
- Iván Zamorano (born 1967), Chilean footballer
- Jordan Zamorano (born 2001), Indonesian footballer
- Maitté Zamorano (born 1981), Bolivian footballer
- Pedro Zamorano (born 1971), French Paralympic athlete
- Rodrigo Zamorano (1542–1620), Spanish cosmographer
- Zamorano (Portuguese footballer) (born 1982)

== Education ==
- Zamorano, a private university in Francisco Morazán Department, Honduras

== Other uses ==
- Chongos zamoranos, a Mexican dessert made of curdled milk
- Estero Zamorano, a river in Chile
- Zamorano cheese, a Spanish cheese made from sheep's milk
- Zamorano Club, American bibliophile club
- Zamorano-Leonés, a Spanish breed of large domestic donkey
- Zamorano Eighty, a list of rare books on the history of California, compiled by the Zamorano Club

== See also ==
- Zamora (disambiguation)
