= Hittell =

Hittel is a surname. Notable people with the surname include:

- John Shertzer Hittell (1825–1901), American author, historian, and journalist
- Theodore H. Hittell (1830–1917), American historian, politician, and writer, brother of John
