= Mika Iwakawa =

Japanese boxer (born 1983)

Mika Iwakawa 岩川美花
Personal information
- Nationality: Japanese
- Born: 26 July 1983 (age 42) Kōnan, Kōchi, Japan
- Height: 161 cm (5 ft 3 in)
- Weight: Atomweight; Mini-flyweight; Light-flyweight; Flyweight

Boxing career
- Stance: Orthodox

Boxing record
- Total fights: 22
- Wins: 13
- Win by KO: 4
- Losses: 8
- Draws: 1

Mika Iwakawa (岩川美花, Iwakawa Mika; born 26 July 1983) is a Japanese professional boxer who held the IBF atomweight title from 2022 to 2024 and the WBO atomweight title from 2018 to 2022.

== Professional career ==
=== Early career ===
Iwakawa made her professional debut on 19 December 2011, where she defeated Shoko Hayashida by knockout KO in a four-round bout at the Korakuen Hall in Tokyo. Iwakawa went on to amass a 5–4–1 record over the next five years, before being booked to face Narirat Klaphom for the vacant OPBF female light flyweight title on 20 August 2016. She captured her first professional title by a second-round technical knockout. Winning this title earned Iwakawa the right to challenge the once-defeated Yunoka Furukawa for the WBA female atomweight title on 13 December 2016, in the co-main event of DANGAN LADIES vol.3, which was held on 13 December 2016 at the Korakuen Hall in Tokyo, Japan. She lost the fight by a closely contested majority decision, with two judges scoring the bout 96–94 and 97–93 for Furukawa, while the third judge scored it an event 95–95.

=== Atomweight world champion ===
==== WBO atomweight champion ====
On 30 June 2018, it was revealed that Iwakawa would face the reigning WBO female atomweight champion Nao Ikeyama, in what was Ikeyama's seventh title defense. The title bout took place on 29 July 2018, at the KBS Hall in Kyoto, Japan. She won the fight by split decision, with two 96–94 scorecards for Iwakawa and one 96–94 scorecard for her opponent. The 48-year old Ikeyama announced her intention to retire in her post-fight interview.

Iwakawa was booked to face the journeyman Momoko Kanda in a non-title bout on 7 December 2019. Iwakawa fought the #1 ranked WBO flyweight to stay busy, as she had been out of the ring for 17 months, with her previous bout against Nao Ikeyama taking place on 29 July 2018. Iwakawa beat Kanda by unanimous decision, with all three judges awarding her a 78-74 scorecard. Iwakawa made her first WBO atomweight title defense against Nanae Suzuki on 26 September 2020, at the Central Gym in Kobe, Japan. Iwakawa maintained distance and scored points by landing one-twos, and was awarded a split decision. Two judges scored the fight 96–94 and 97–93 for her, while the third judge scored it 97–93 for Suzuki.

On 5 April 2021, Tadanori Yamashita, the chairman of her former gym Takasago Gym, was arrested and had his boxing license suspended. Following this, Iwakawa left and began training at the Himeji Kinoshita Gym. On 27 December of the same year, it was announced that Iwakawa and Nanae Suzuki would face each other in an immediate rematch, due to the close nature of their first meeting. The bout took place on 25 February 2022. Iwakawa lost the fight by split decision, with scores of 96–94, 94–96 and 94–96.

==== IBF atomweight champion ====
During a press conference held on 21 July 2022, it was announced that Iwakawa would challenge Ayaka Miyao for the IBF female atomweight title on the undercard of "Queens Crest 2022", an all female event held jointly by Shinsei Promotion, Misako Promotion and DANGAN. She won the fight by a close unanimous decision, with all three judges scoring the bout 96–94 in her favor.

Iwakawa faced Ploypailin Palatsrichuai in a stay-busy, non-title bout on 26 February 2023. She won the fight by a third-round technical knockout.

Iwakawa lost the IBF World title to fellow Japanese boxer Sumire Yamanaka with a unanimous decision defeat at Korakuen Hall in Tokyo on 12 January 2024.

==== Post-title career ====
Aged 41, Iwakawa faced 17 year old Camila Zamorano for the vacant WBC interim female atomweight title in Hermosillo, Mexico, on 14 June 2025, but lost on a unanimous decision.

== Professional boxing record ==
22 fights	13 wins	8 losses
By knockout	4	0
By decision	9	8
Draws	1	

No.	Result	Record	Opponent	Type	Round, time	Date	Location	Notes
22	Loss	13–8–1	Camila Zamorano	UD	10	14 Jun 2025	El Centro de Usos Múltiples, Hermosillo, Mexico	For vacant WBC interim female atomweight title
21	Win	13–7–1	Wisuta Sririttidet	UD	6	30 Mar 2025	Hiokayama Gym, Kakogawa, Japan	
20	Loss	12–7–1	Sumire Yamanaka	UD	10	12 Jan 2024	Korakuen Hall, Tokyo, Japan	Lost IBF female atomweight title
19	Win	12–6–1	Ploypailin Palatsrichuai	TKO	3 (6), 0:45	26 Feb 2023	Chres Gym, Kōchi, Japan	
18	Win	11–6–1	Ayaka Miyao	UD	10	1 Sep 2022	Korakuen Hall, Tokyo, Japan	Won IBF female atomweight title
17	Loss	10–6–1	Nanae Suzuki	SD	10	25 Feb 2022	Korakuen Hall, Tokyo, Japan	Lost WBO female atomweight title
16	Win	10–5–1	Nanae Suzuki	SD	10	26 Sep 2020	Central Gym, Kobe, Japan	Retained WBO female atomweight title
15	Win	9–5–1	Momoko Kanda	UD	8	7 Dec 2019	Art Center, Kobe, Japan	
14	Win	8–5–1	Nao Ikeyama	SD	10	29 Jul 2018	KBS Hall, Kyoto, Japan	Won WBO female atomweight title
13	Win	7–5–1	Amonrat Wongpiyamarat	KO	4 (8), 1:04	22 Oct 2017	Mirai Chushin, Kurayoshi, Japan	
12	Loss	6–5–1	Yunoka Furukawa	MD	10	13 Dec 2016	Korakuen Hall, Tokyo, Japan	For WBA female atomweight title
11	Win	6–4–1	Narirat Klaphom	TKO	2 (8), 1:08	20 Aug 2016	Komagatani Gym, Sanda, Japan	Won vacant OPBF female light-flyweight title
10	Loss	5–4–1	Brisa Hernandez	UD	6	10 Jun 2016	Asociación Mexico Japonesa, Mexico City, Mexico	
9	Win	5–3–1	Sana Hazuki	UD	6	1 Mar 2016	Central Gym, Kobe, Japan	
8	Win	4–3–1	Aiko Yamagishi	UD	6	17 Oct 2015	Sangyo Hall, Kanazawa, Japan	
7	Loss	3–3–1	Satomi Nishimura	UD	6	24 May 2015	Kyushu Kyoritsu University, Kitakyushu, Japan	
6	Loss	3–2–1	Nao Ikeyama	MD	6	14 Dec 2013	Azalea Taisho, Osaka, Japan	
5	Draw	3–1–1	Kumiko Seeser Ikehara	TD	1 (6), 1:44	10 Aug 2013	Azalea Taisho, Osaka, Japan	
4	Loss	3–1	Mako Yamada	UD	6	9 Feb 2013	Azalea Taisho, Osaka, Japan	
3	Win	3–0	Kumiko Seeser Ikehara	UD	4	16 Sep 2012	Yomiuri Bunka Hall, Toyonaka, Japan	
2	Win	2–0	Makoto Tsukashita	UD	4	17 Jun 2012	Aioi Hall, Kariya, Japan	
1	Win	1–0	Shoko Hayashida	KO	3 (4), 0:54	19 Dec 2011	Korakuen Hall, Tokyo, Japan	

== See also ==
- List of current female world boxing champions
- List of WBO female world champions
- List of IBF female world champions
