= Zamorano Eighty =

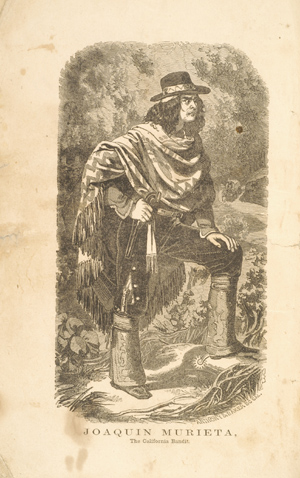
Picture, possibly by Charles Nahl, of "Joaquín Murieta, The California Bandit", from the rarest book of the Zamorano 80, The Life and Adventures of Joaquín Murieta, 1854

The Zamorano Eighty is a list of books intended to represent the most significant early volumes published on the history of California. It was compiled in 1945 by members of the Zamorano Club, a Los Angeles–based group of bibliophiles. Collecting first editions of every volume on the list has become the goal of a number of book collectors, though to date only four people have completed the task.

The Zamorano Club was founded in 1928 and named for Agustín Vicente Zamorano, the first printer in California. A series of committees of Club members, including former American Smelting and Refining Company executive Henry Raup Wagner and bibliographer Robert Cowan, assembled a list of a hundred books, eventually whittled down to eighty. During this process, Cowan died, and his Bibliography of the History of California and the Pacific West was added to the list as a tribute.

The list contains significant works by a number of well-known authors like Mark Twain, John Muir, Bret Harte, and Robert Louis Stevenson, as well as obscure texts concerning geographical exploration and legal matters. Some of the works exist in very few, highly sought after copies, while others were quite common and not particularly valuable, until interest in the list caused their prices to rise. Book dealers often refer to items for sale using their "Zamorano number" or have special sections dedicated to items on the list.

Thomas Streeter was the first collector to assemble a complete collection of first editions of every item on the list. His collection was auctioned between 1966 and 1969. Businessman Frederick William Beinecke was the second. Retired investment counselor Henry H. Clifford completed his collection in 1988 and his collection was auctioned in 1995. The fourth was architect Daniel Guatave Volkmann Jr., who completed his collection in 1994, and it was auctioned in 2003. Many other collectors have pursued this goal, including notorious bibliomane and book thief Stephen Blumberg.

Only one institution, the Beinecke Rare Book and Manuscript Library at Yale University, possesses a complete collection of the Zamorano 80, donated by Frederick W. Beinecke. Both the Bancroft Library at the University of California, Berkeley and the Huntington Library in San Marino, California, possess all but one of the volumes.

The rarest book on the list is number 64, the dime novel The Life and Adventures of Joaquín Murieta by John Rollin Ridge writing as "Yellow Bird". Only two first-edition copies are known to exist, each used twice to complete the list. It may be on the list only because Wagner owned a copy, which he sold to Streeter. When Streeter's collection was being periodically auctioned, the auction of this copy was moved up over a year so the elderly Beinecke would be able to complete his Zamorano collection. This copy is now in the Beinecke Library with the rest of Beinecke's Zamorano books. Clifford purchased the second copy from a collector in Maine, which in turn was purchased by Volkmann at the auction of Clifford's collection. The book has been described with terms like "Holy Grail" and "rara avis" and is highly desired by collectors. Blumberg wanted it so much he and his accomplices planned and researched a potential burglary of Clifford's house when that collector owned the book.

== The Zamorano Eighty ==
The works on the list are numbered in alphabetical order by author (or title, in the case of numbers 14, 35, and 62) and were not intended to be any sort of ranking of literary or financial value.

#	Author	Title	Year	Cover or title page
1	Gertrude Atherton	The Splendid Idle Forties: Stories of Old California	1902	book cover
2	Mary Austin	The Land of Little Rain	1903	book cover
3	Hubert Howe Bancroft	Works, 39 volumes	1882–90	book cover
4	Frederick William Beechey	Narrative of a Voyage to the Pacific and Beering's Strait, to Co-Operate with the Polar Expeditions: Performed in His Majesty's Ship Blossom, under the Command of Captain F. W. Beechey, 2 volumes	1831	book cover
5	Horace Bell	Reminiscences of a Ranger: Early Times in Southern California	1881	book cover
6	Anthony J. Bledsoe	Indian Wars of the Northwest: A California Sketch	1885	book cover
7	Herbert Eugene Bolton	Anza's California Expeditions, 5 volumes	1930	–
8	John David Borthwick	Three Years in California	1857	book cover
9	William Henry Brewer	Up and Down California in 1860–1864: The Journal of William H. Brewer	1930	–
10	John Henry Brown	Reminiscences and Incidents of The Early Days of San Francisco	1886	book cover
11	John Ross Browne	Report of the Debates in the Convention of California, on the Formation of the State Constitution, in September and October, 1849	1850	book cover
12	Edwin Bryant	What I Saw in California: Being the Journal of a Tour, by the Emigrant Route and South Pass of the Rocky Mountains, across the Continent of North America, the Great Desert Basin, and through California, in the Years 1846, 1847	1849	book cover
13	Peter Hardeman Burnett	Recollections and Opinions of an Old Pioneer	1880	book cover
14	various authors	California and New Mexico: Message from the President of the United States, Transmitting Information in Answer to a Resolution of the House of the 31st of December, 1849, on the Subject of California and New Mexico	1850	book cover
15	Carlos Antonio Carrillo	Exposicion Dirigida a la Camara de Diputados Del Congreso de la Union	1831	book cover
16	James H. Carson	Early Recollections of the Mines and a Description of the Great Tulare Valley	1852	book cover
17	Samuel Clemens	The Celebrated Jumping Frog of Calaveras County, and Other Sketches	1867	book cover
18	Samuel Clemens	Roughing It	1872	book cover
19	James Clyman	James Clyman, American Frontiersman, 1792–1881: The adventures of a trapper and covered wagon emigrant as told in his own reminiscences and diaries	1928	–
20	Walter Colton	Three Years in California	1850	title page
21	Ina Donna Coolbrith	Songs from the Golden Gate	1895	book cover
22	Miguel Costansó	Diario Histórico de los Viages de Mar, y Tierra Hechos al Norte de la California	1770	title page
23	Robert Ernest Cowan	Bibliography of the history of California and the Pacific West, 1510–1906	1914	title page
24	Ella Sterling Cummins	The story of the files; a review of California writers and literature	1893	title page
25	Harrison Clifford Dale	The Ashley-Smith explorations and the discovery of a central route to the Pacific, 1822–1829	1918	title page
26	Richard Henry Dana	Two Years Before the Mast: A Personal Narrative of Life at Sea	1840	book cover
27	William Heath Davis	Sixty Years in California	1889	title page
28	Winfield J. Davis	History of Political Conventions in California, 1849–1892	1893	–
29	Alonzo Delano	Old Block's sketch-book; or, Tales of California life	1856	book cover
30	Eugène Duflot de Mofras	Exploration du territoire de l’Orégon, des Californies et de la mer Vermeille, exécutée pendant les années 1840, 1841 et 1842	1844	–
31	Auguste Bernard Duhaut-Cilly	Voyage autour du Monde, principalement à la Californie et aux Iles Sandwich, pendant les années 1826, 1827, 1828, et 1829	1834–35	–
32	John W. Dwinelle	The colonial history of the city of San Francisco : being a synthetic argument in the District Court of the United States for the northern district of California, for four square leagues of land claimed by that city	1863	–
33	William Hemsley Emory	Notes of a Military Reconnaissance, from Fort Leavenworth, in Missouri, to San Diego, in California including part of the Arkansas, Del Norte, and Gila Rivers.	1848	–
34	Zephyrin Engelhardt	The Missions and Missionaries of California, 5 volumes	1908–16	–
35	Gaspar de Portolà (attributed)	Estracto de noticias del puerto de Monterrey, de la missión, y presidio que se han establecido en el con la denominación de San Carlos, y del sucesso de las dos expediciones de mar, y tierra que a este fin se despacharon en el año proximo anterior de 1769	1770	title page
36	Thomas J. Farnham	Travels in the Californias, and Scenes in the Pacific Ocean	1844	title page
37	José Figueroa	Manifiesto á la República Mejicana que hace el General de Brigada José Figueroa, Comandante General y Gefe Político de la Alta California, sobre su conducta y de los Señores D. José María de Híjar y D. José María Padrés, como Directores de Colonización en 1834 y 1835	1835	
38	Alexander Forbes	California: A History of Upper and Lower California from Their First Discovery to the Present Time, Comprising an Account of the Climate, Soil, Natural Productions, Agriculture, Commerce &c. A Full View of the Missionary Establishments and Condition of the Free and Domesticated Indians. With an Appendix Relating to Steam Navigation in the Pacific. Illustrated with a New Map, Plans of the Harbours, and Numerous Engravings	1839	–
39	John Charles Frémont	Report of the Exploring Expedition to the Rocky Mountains in the Year 1842, and to Oregon and North California in the Years 1843–'44	1845	–
40	Bret Harte	The Luck of Roaring Camp, and Other Sketches	1870	–
41	Lansford W. Hastings	The Emigrants' Guide, to Oregon and California, Containing Scenes and Incidents of a Party of Oregon Emigrants; a Description of Oregon; Scenes and Incidents of a Party of California Emigrants; and a Description of California; with a Description of the Different Routes to Those Countries; and All Necessary Information Relative to the Equipment, Supplies, and the Method of Traveling	1845	book cover
42	Theodore Henry Hittell	The Adventures of James Capen Adams, Mountaineer and Grizzly Bear Hunter, of California	1860	book cover
43	Theodore Henry Hittell	History of California, 4 volumes	1885–97	–
44	Ogden Hoffman	Reports of Land Cases Determined in the United States District Court for the Northern District of California. June Term, 1853, to June Term, 1858, Inclusive	1862	–
45	Simeon Ide	A Biographical Sketch of the Life of William B. Ide: With a Minute and Interesting Account of One of the Largest Emigrating Companies (3000 Miles Over Land), from the East to the Pacific Coast. And What Is Claimed As the Most Authentic and Reliable Account of “The Virtual Conquest of California, in June, 1846, by the Bear Flag Party,” As Given by Its Leader, the Late Hon. William Brown Ide	1880	–
46	Helen Hunt Jackson	Ramona	1884	book cover
47	Clarence King	Mountaineering in the Sierra Nevada	1872	–
48	Otto von Kotzebue	Entdeckungs-Reise in die Süd-See und nach der Berings-Strasse zur Erforschung einer nordöstlichen Durchfahrt. Unternommen in den Jahren 1815, 1816, 1817 und 1818	1821	title page
49	Jean-François de Galaup, comte de Lapérouse	Voyage de La Pérouse Autour du Monde, Publié Conformément au Décret du 22 Avril 1791, et Rédigé par M. L. A. Milet-Mureau, Général de Brigade dans le Corps du Génie, Directeur des Fortifications, Ex-Constituent, Membre de Plusieurs Sociétés Littéraires de Paris, 4 volumes	1797	–
50	Zenas Leonard	Narrative of the Adventures of Zenas Leonard, a Native of Clearfield County, Pa. Who Spent Five Years in Trapping for Furs, Trading with the Indians &c. &c., of the Rocky Mountains: Written by Himself	1839	–
51	William Lewis Manly	Death Valley in '49. Important Chapter of California Pioneer History. The Autobiography of a Pioneer, Detailing His Life from a Humble Home in the Green Mountains to the Gold Mines of California; and Particularly Reciting the Sufferings of the Band of Men, Women, and Children Who Gave "Death Valley" Its Name	1894	book cover
52	Frank Marryat	Mountains and Molehills; or, Recollections of a Burnt Journal	1855	book cover
53	Charles Fayette McGlashan	History of the Donner Party: A Tragedy of the Sierras	1879	–
54	Edward McGowan	Narrative of Edward McGowan, Including a Full Account of the Author’s Adventures and Perils while Persecuted by the San Francisco Vigilance Committee of 1856	1857	book cover
55	Joaquin Miller	Life amongst the Modocs: Unwritten History	1873	book cover
56	John Muir	The Mountains of California	1894	–
57	Harris Newmark	Sixty Years in Southern California 1853–1913. Containing the Reminiscences of Harris Newmark	1916	–
58	Frank Norris	McTeague: A Story of San Francisco	1899	book cover
59	Francisco Palóu	Relación histórica de la vida y apostólicas tareas del Venerable Padre Fray Junípero Serra, y de las misiones que fundó en la California septentrional, y nuevos establecimientos de Monterey	1787	–
60	James O. Pattie	The Personal Narrative of James O. Pattie, of Kentucky, during an Expedition from St. Louis, through the Vast Regions between That Place and the Pacific Ocean, and Thence Back through the City of Mexico to Vera Cruz, during Journeyings of Six Years; in Which He and His Father, Who Accompanied Him, Suffered Unheard of Hardships and Dangers, Had Various Conflicts with the Indians, and Were Made Captives, in Which Captivity His Father Died; Together with a Description of the Country, and the Various Nations through Which They Passed	1831	–
61	Stephen Powers	Afoot and Alone: A Walk from Sea to Sea by the Southern Route. Adventures and Observations in Southern California, New Mexico, Arizona, Texas, etc.	1872	book cover
62	unknown	Reglamento para el gobierno de la Provincia de Californias. Aprobado por S. M. en Real Órden de 24. de octubre de 1781	1784	–
63	Joseph Warren Revere	A Tour of Duty in California; Including a Description of the Gold Region: And an Account of the Voyage around Cape Horn; with Notices of Lower California, the Gulf and Pacific Coasts, and the Principal Events Attending the Conquest of the Californias	1849	–
64	John Rollin Ridge	The Life and Adventures of Joaquín Murieta, the Celebrated California Bandit. By Yellow Bird	1854	book cover
65	Alfred Robinson	Life in California: During a Residence of Several Years in That Territory, Comprising a Description of the Country and the Missionary Establishments, with Incidents, Observations, Etc., Etc.	1846	–
66	Josiah Royce	California from the Conquest in 1846 to the Second Vigilance Committee in San Francisco: A Study of American Character	1886	–
67	Edwin L. Sabin	Kit Carson Days (1809–1868)	1914	book cover
68	Charles Howard Shinn	Mining Camps: A Study in American Frontier Government	1885	–
69	Dame Shirley	"California, in 1851" and "California, in 1852" in The Pioneer; or, California Monthly Magazine [The "Shirley Letters"]	1854–55	–
70	Frank Soulé, John H. Gigon, and James Nisbet	The Annals of San Francisco; Containing a Summary of the History of the First Discovery, Settlement, Progress, and Present Condition of California, and a Complete History of All the Important Events Connected with Its Great City: To Which Are Added, Biographical Memoirs of Some Prominent Citizens	1855	–
71	Robert Louis Stevenson	The Silverado Squatters	1883	book cover
72	William F. Swasey	The Early Days and Men of California	1891	book cover
73	Bayard Taylor	Eldorado; or, Adventures in the Path of Empire: Comprising a Voyage to California, via Panama; Life in San Francisco and Monterey; Pictures of the Gold Region, and Experiences of Mexican Travel, 2 volumes	1850	–
74	J. Quinn Thornton	Oregon and California in 1848...with an Appendix, Including Recent and Authentic Information on the Subject of the Gold Mines of California, and Other Valuable Matter of Interest to the Emigrant, 2 volumes	1849	–
75	Daniel Tyler	A Concise History of the Mormon Battalion in the Mexican War. 1846–1847	1881	–
76	Samuel Curtis Upham	Notes of a Voyage to California via Cape Horn, Together with Scenes in El Dorado, in the Years 1849–'50. With an Appendix Containing Reminiscences of Pioneer Journalism in California	1878	–
77	George Vancouver	A Voyage of Discovery to the North Pacific Ocean, and round the World; in Which the Coast of North-West America Has Been Carefully Examined and Accurately Surveyed. Undertaken by His Majesty’s Command, Principally with a View to Ascertain the Existence of Any Navigable Communication between the North Pacific and North Atlantic Oceans; and Performed in the Years 1790, 1791, 1792, 1793, 1794, and 1795, in the Discovery Sloop of War, and Armed Tender Chatham, 4 volumes	1798	–
78	Miguel Venegas	Noticia de la California, y de su conquista temporal, y espiritual hasta el tiempo presente. Sacada de la historia manuscrita, formada en Mexico año de 1739, 3 volumes	1757	title page
79	Felix Paul Wierzbicki	California As It Is, and As It May Be; or, A Guide to the Gold Region	1849	title page
80	Daniel Bates Woods	Sixteen Months at the Gold Diggings	1851	title page
