= Nanae Suzuki =

Japanese boxer (born 1992)

Nanae Suzuki 鈴木菜々江
Personal information
- Nationality: Japanese
- Born: 12 May 1992 (age 34) Ichikawa, Chiba, Japan
- Height: 5 ft 1 in (155 cm)
- Weight: Atomweight; Mini-flyweight; Light-flyweight

Boxing career
- Stance: Orthodox

Boxing record
- Total fights: 18
- Wins: 11
- Win by KO: 1
- Losses: 6
- Draws: 1

Nanae Suzuki (Japanese: 鈴木菜々江, Suzuki Nanae; born 12 May 1992) is a Japanese former professional boxer who held the WBO atomweight title from 25 February 2022 to 1 September 2022. At the regional level, Suzuki held the Japanese atomweight title from 2018 to 2019.

== Boxing career ==
=== Early career ===
Suzuki made her professional debut against Ayumu Seki on 1 March 2016. She won the fight by unanimous decision. Suzuki amassed a 5–2 record during the next eighteen months, before being booked to face Sana Hazuki for the vacant Japanese atomweight title on 17 December 2017. The fight ended in a split decision draw. An immediate rematch was scheduled, with the vacant title on the line, on 8 March 2018. Suzuki won the title by majority decision, with scores of 58–57, 57–57 and 58–57. Suzuki made two successful title defense: a unanimous decision against Akari Arase on 20 August 2018, and a majority decision against Sayaka Aoki on 20 November 2018.

=== WBO atomweight champion ===
==== Suzuki vs. Iwakawa ====
On 12 February 2020, it was announced that the WBO atomweight champion Mika Iwakawa would make her maiden title defense against Suzuki. The title bout was scheduled as the co-main event of "Guts Fighting & DANGAN", which was expected to take place on 17 March at the Korakuen Hall in Tokyo, Japan. The entire event was cancelled on 27 February however, due to measures imposed by the Japanese government to combat the spread of COVID-19. The fight was rescheduled for 26 September 2020, as the co-main event of "REAL SPIRITS.68" which took place at the Kobe Central Gymnasium in Kobe, Japan

She lost the fight by a closely contested split decision. Two of the judges scored the fight scored the fight 97–93 for Iwakwa, while the third judge had it 96–94 for Suzuki. The bout was evenly fought until the last two rounds, which was reflected in the judges scored cards, who had Iwakawa slightly in the lead at the end of the eight round (76–76, 78–74 and 77–75). The champion managed to rally in the final two rounds however, which led to two of the judges awarding her the ninth and tenth round, while the last judge scored the ninth for Suzuki and the tenth for Suzuki.

==== Suzuki vs. Iwakawa II ====
On 30 August 2021, Japanese-based boxing promotion DANGAN announced that Iwakawa would make her second WBO atomweight title defense against Suzuki on 15 October 2021, in the main event of "VICTORIA.7", an all-female boxing card. Iwakawa withdrew from the bout on 7 October, a week before it was supposed to take place, due to an undisclosed injury. The title fight was rescheduled for 25 February 2022, fifteen months after their first meeting, as the co-main event of "VICTORIVA.8", another all-female boxing card. It took place at the Korakuen Hall in Tokyo, Japan. Suzuki won the rematch by split decision, with two judges scoring the fight 96–94 in her favor, while the third judge awarded an identical scorecard to Iwakawa.

==== Suzuki vs. Kuroki ====
Suzuki made her first title defense against the former WBC minimumweight champion Yuko Kuroki on 1 September 2022. The fight headlined "Queens Crest 2022", an all-women's card, which took place at the Korakuen Hall in Tokyo, Japan. Suzuki struggled to successfully pressure the southpaw Kuroki, who utilized outboxing tactics to win the fight by a wide unanimous decision. Two of the judges awarded Kuroki eight of the ten contested rounds, while the third judge scored seven of the ten rounds for the challenger.

=== Post title reign ===
Suzuki was booked to challenge the WBO atomweight champion Yuko Kuroki in the main event of "VICTORIVA vol.11", which took place at the Korakuen Hall in Tokyo, Japan on March 30, 2023. She lost the fight by unanimous decision, with two scorecards of 96–94 and one scorecard of 97–93.

=== Retirement ===
Suzuki announced her retirement from professional boxing on 1 September 2023.

== Professional boxing record ==
| 18 fights | 11 wins | 6 losses |
|---|---|---|
| By knockout | 1 | 1 |
| By decision | 10 | 5 |
| Draws | 1 | |

| No. | Result | Record | Opponent | Type | Round, time | Date | Location | Notes |
|---|---|---|---|---|---|---|---|---|
| 18 | Loss | 11–6–1 | Yuko Kuroki | UD | 10 | 30 Mar 2023 | Korakuen Hall, Tokyo, Japan | For WBO female atomweight title |
| 17 | Loss | 11–5–1 | Yuko Kuroki | UD | 10 | 1 Sep 2022 | Korakuen Hall, Tokyo, Japan | Lost WBO female atomweight title |
| 16 | Win | 11–4–1 | Mika Iwakawa | SD | 10 | 25 Feb 2022 | Korakuen Hall, Tokyo, Japan | Won WBO female atomweight title |
| 15 | Loss | 10–4–1 | Mika Iwakawa | SD | 10 | 26 Sep 2020 | Central Gym, Kobe, Japan | For WBO female atomweight title |
| 14 | Win | 10–3–1 | Kanyarat Yoohanngoh | UD | 8 | 20 Nov 2019 | Korakuen Hall, Tokyo, Japan | |
| 13 | Win | 9–3–1 | Minayo Kei | UD | 8 | 12 Sep 2019 | Korakuen Hall, Tokyo, Japan | |
| 12 | Loss | 8–3–1 | Eri Matsuda | UD | 8 | 13 Mar 2019 | Korakuen Hall, Tokyo, Japan | Lost Japanese female atomweight title; For OPBF female atomweight title |
| 11 | Win | 8–2–1 | Sayaka Aoki | MD | 6 | 20 Nov 2018 | Korakuen Hall, Tokyo, Japan | Retained Japanese female atomweight title |
| 10 | Win | 7–2–1 | Akari Arase | UD | 6 | 20 Aug 2018 | Korakuen Hall, Tokyo, Japan | Retained Japanese female atomweight title |
| 9 | Win | 6–2–1 | Sana Hazuki | MD | 6 | 8 Mar 2018 | Korakuen Hall, Tokyo, Japan | Won vacant Japanese female atomweight title |
| 8 | Draw | 5–2–1 | Sana Hazuki | SD | 6 | 17 Dec 2017 | Kyuden Gym, Fukuoka, Japan | For vacant Japanese female atomweight title |
| 7 | Win | 5–2 | Chie Higano | UD | 6 | 1 Sep 2017 | Korakuen Hall, Tokyo, Japan | |
| 6 | Win | 4–2 | Chisa Naito | UD | 4 | 19 May 2017 | Korakuen Hall, Tokyo, Japan | |
| 5 | Win | 3–2 | Yumiko Shimooka | MD | 4 | 15 Mar 2017 | Korakuen Hall, Tokyo, Japan | |
| 4 | Win | 2–2 | Haruko Kaneko | TKO | 2 (4) | 13 Dec 2016 | Korakuen Hall, Tokyo, Japan | |
| 3 | Loss | 1–2 | Sayaka Aoki | TKO | 3 (4) | 21 Sep 2016 | Korakuen Hall, Tokyo, Japan | |
| 2 | Loss | 1–1 | Yumiko Shimooka | SD | 4 | 15 Jul 2016 | Korakuen Hall, Tokyo, Japan | |
| 1 | Win | 1–0 | Ayumu Seki | UD | 4 | 1 Mar 2016 | Korakuen Hall, Tokyo, Japan | |

== See also ==
- List of WBO female world champions
