= Grizzly Adams (disambiguation) =

John "Grizzly" Adams (c. 1812–1860) was a California mountaineer and grizzly bear tamer.

Grizzly Adams may also refer to:

- The Life and Times of Grizzly Adams (1974–1982), television and film series
- Grizzly Adams Wolfsburg, German professional ice hockey team

== See also ==
- Adams State Grizzlies, collegiate sports teams
