= Denise Castle =

English Muay Thai fighter and boxer (born 1971)

Personal information
- Nickname: Denise Onesongchaigym
- Born: 24 October 1971 (age 54) Bournemouth, England
- Height: 5 ft 3 1/2 in (161 cm)
- Weight: Atomweight; Mini-flyweight

Boxing career
- Reach: 64 in (163 cm)
- Stance: Orthodox

Boxing record
- Total fights: 9
- Wins: 5
- Win by KO: 5
- Losses: 4

Denise Castle (née Mellor; born 24 October 1971) is an English professional boxer and Muay Thai fighter.

In Muay Thai, she has won the mini flyweight international and world titles under the WBC Muaythai banner. In boxing, she has held the WIBA female atomweight title since August 2024. Castle has been described as the "hardest mother in the world".

== Muay Thai career ==
Castle faced Lotta Loikkanen for the inaugural WBC Muaythai World Mini Flyweight Championship on 25 July 2010. She lost the bout by decision after five rounds.

She faced Annie Errikson for the inaugural WBC Muaythai International Mini Flyweight Championship on 14 July 2011, at "Muaythai World Series" at O2 Academy Bournemouth in Bournemouth, England. She won the bout by unanimous decision, thus winning the title.

On 2 October 2011, Castle faced Erika Kamimura for the inaugural WBC Muaythai International Light Flyweight Championship. She lost the bout via first-round knockout.

She faced Nattaya Kantasit for the WBC Muaythai world mini flyweight title on 22 June 2012, at O2 Academy Bournemouth and won the bout by unanimous decision.

== Championships and accomplishments ==
=== Muay Thai ===
- World Boxing Council Muaythai
  - 2011 WBC International Women's Mini Flyweight champion
  - 2012 WBC World Women's Mini Flyweight champion

== Boxing career ==
In her boxing debut, Castle faced Dorkmaipa Keangpompetch on 9 April 2014, at the MBK Center. She won the bout via knockout.

On 2 August 2014, Castle faced Momo Koseki for WBC female atomweight title. She lost the bout by technical knockout in the eight round.

On 5 September 2018, it was revealed that Castle would face Fabiana Bytyqi for the vacant WBC atomweight title. She entered the bout following a four-year long absence from the sport. The fight took place at the Sportcentrum Sluneta in Ústí nad Labem, on 22 September 2018. She lost the fight by unanimous decision.

Castle faced Sutthinee Bamrungpao for the WIBA World Atomweight Championship on 26 October 2019, in Nonthaburi, Thailand. She won the bout by referee stoppage in the fifth round.

She fought Sana Hazuki for the vacant WBC Silver female atomweight title at Spaceplus Bangkok RCA in Bangkok, Thailand, on 28 September 2023, losing when she retired at the end of the fifth round due to a swollen eye.

Castle won the vacant WIBA atomweight title by stopping Panida Chatluang in the fourth round at Racha Fight Club in Hua Hin, Thailand, on 17 August 2024.

== Professional boxing record ==
9 fights	5 wins	4 losses
By knockout	5	2
By decision	0	2

No.	Result	Record	Opponent	Type	Round, time	Date	Location	Notes
9	Win	5–4	Panida Chatluang	TKO	4 (10), 1:30	17 Aug 2024	Racha Fight Club, Hua Hin, Thailand	Won vacant WIBA atomweight title
8	Win	4–4	Dunphet Akatong	TKO	2 (4), 1:31	29 Jun 2024	Hua Hin Muaythai Stadium, Hua Hin, Thailand	
7	Loss	3–4	Sana Hazuki	RTD	5 (10), 3:00	28 Sep 2023	Spaceplus Bangkok RCA, Bangkok, Thailand	For vacant WBC Silver female atomweight title
6	Loss	3–3	Norj Guro	SD	8	26 Mar 2022	Habtoor Grand Hotel, Dubai, UAE	For vacant WBC Silver female atomweight title
5	Win	3–2	Sutthinee Bamrungpao	TKO	5 (10), 1:15	26 Oct 2019	Triam Udom Suksa School, Bangkok, Thailand	Won vacant WIBA mini-flyweight title
4	Loss	2–2	Fabiana Bytyqi	UD	10	22 Sep 2018	Sportovni Hala Klise, Ústí nad Labem, Czech Republic	For vacant WBC female atomweight title
3	Loss	2–1	Momo Koseki	TKO	8 (10), 0:29	2 Aug 2014	Adachi Ward Sogo Sports Center, Tokyo, Japan	For WBC female atomweight title
2	Win	2–0	Saranyaphong Theinthong	TKO	6 (8)	11 Apr 2014	Nonthaburi Pier, Mueang Nonthaburi, Thailand	
1	Win	1–0	Dorkmaipa Keangpompetch	KO	1 (8)	9 Apr 2014	MBK Center, Bangkok, Thailand	

== See also ==
- List of female boxers

Sporting positions
Minor world boxing titles
Vacant Title last held by Asiye Özlem Sahin	WIBA mini-flyweight champion 26 October 2019 – 2019; Vacated	Vacant
Vacant Title last held by Norj Guro	WIBA Atomweight champion 17 August 2024 – present	Incumbent
