= Fabiana Bytyqi =

Czech boxer (born 1995)

Fabiána Richter
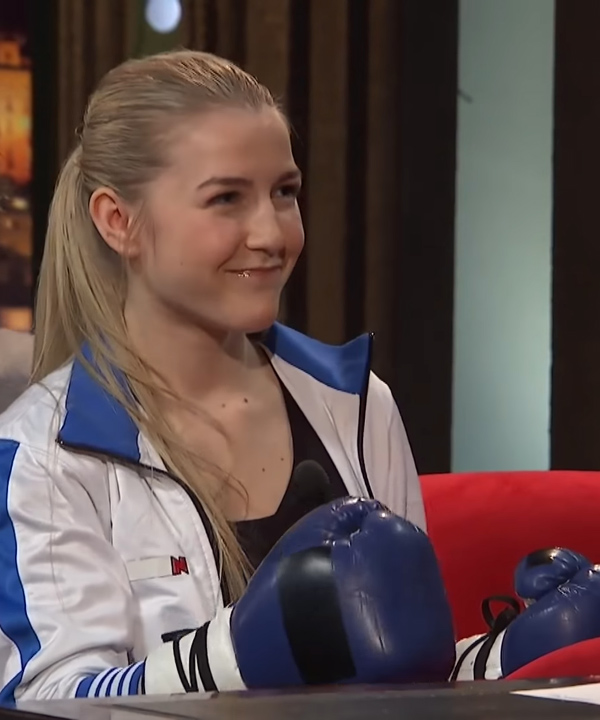
- Bytyqi in 2016.

Personal information
- Nickname: Angel Fist (Andělská pěst)
- Nationality: Czech
- Born: Fabiána Bytyqi; 30 December 1995 (age 30) Ústí nad Labem, Czech Republic
- Height: 1.64 m (5 ft 5 in)
- Weight: Atomweight; Mini-flyweight; Light-flyweight; Flyweight; Bantamweight

Boxing career
- Stance: Orthodox

Boxing record
- Total fights: 27
- Wins: 22
- Win by KO: 5
- Losses: 3
- Draws: 2

Fabiána Richter (Note: Also spelled Fabiana.) (Note: Czech: [ˈfabɪjaːna ˈrɪxtɛr], German: [ˈʁɪçtɐ]) (née Bytyqi (Note: Czech: [ˈbɪtɪt͡ʃɪ], Albanian: [byˈtyc͡çi]); born 30 December 1995) is a Czech professional boxer of Kosovan descent. She held the WBC female atomweight title from 2018 to 2024. Bytyqi is the first female boxer from the Czech Republic to win a major world title.

== Career ==
=== Early career ===
Fabiana Bytyqi made her professional debut on 7 March 2015 at the Maritim Hotel in Magdeburg, Germany against Andrea Jenei. Bytyqi won the fight by technical knockout. Bytyqi won her next five fights before being booked to face Teodora Bacheva for the vacant WBC Youth female minimumweight title. The title bout took place on 5 March 2016, at the Home Monitoring Aréna in Plzeň, Czech Republic. She won the fight by unanimous decision, with all three judges scoring it 96–94 in her favor. Bytyqi faced Teodora Bacheva in an immediate rematch in her first title defense, which took place 25 June 2022. Bacheva retired from the fight at the end of the seventh round. Bytyqi made her second title defense against Halima Vunjabei on 19 November 2016. She won the fight by a dominant unanimous decision, with two scorecards of 99–91 and one scorecard of 100–90.

Bytyqi faced Evgeniya Zablotskaya in a non-title bout on 11 March 2017. She won the fight by unanimous decision, with scores of 99–93, 98–92 and 98–92. Six months later, on 30 September 2017, Bytyqi faced Luisana Bolívar in her third and final WBC Youth title defense. She retained her title by unanimous decision, with scores of 98–93, 97–93 and 96–94. Bytyqi would next face Fatuma Yazidu for the vacant WBC Silver female minimumweight title on 2 December 2017. She captured her second professional regional title by a second-round technical knockout.

=== WBC Atomweight champion ===
On 5 September 2018, it was revealed that Bytyqi would face the once defeated Denise Castle for the vacant WBC atomweight title. Castle entered the bout following a four-year long absence from the sport of boxing, with her sole loss coming against Momo Koseki in her first WBC title fight. The fight took place at the Sportcentrum Sluneta in Ústí nad Labem, on 22 September 2018. She won the fight by unanimous decision, with two judges awarding her a 100–90 scorecard, while the third judge awarded her a 99–91 scorecard. Bytyqi became the first female boxer from the Czech Republic to win a major world title.

After obtaining her first world title, Bytyqi made her first title defense on 6 April 2019 against Soledad Vargas at the same venue in which she captured the belt, the Sportcentrum Sluneta in Ústí nad Labem. Bytyqi managed to defend her crown by split decision draw after 10 rounds against the Mexican boxer. Judge Ondrej Holubek scored the bout 97–96 for Bytyqi, judge Esa Lehtosaari scored the bout 98–93 for Vargas, while judge Jan Teleki scored it as an even 95–95 draw. Both fighters stated their desire for a rematch.

Bytyqi made her second championship defense against the six-time world title challenger Ana Arrazola on 30 November 2019, at the Sportovni Hala Kladno in Kladno, Czech Republic. She retained her title by unanimous decision, with two scorecards of 96–94 and one scorecard of 97–93.

Bytyqi faced Claudia Ferenczi in a non-title bout on 25 September 2020. She won the fight by unanimous decision. Bytyqi went on to fight in three more non-title bouts: she beat Judit Hachbold by unanimous decision on 27 February 2021, Fara El Bousairi by majority decision on 2 October 2021, and Ivanka Ivanova by unanimous decision on 5 March 2022.

Bytyqi made her second WBC atomweight title defense against Elizabeth Lopez Corzo on 29 July 2022, nearly three years after her previous championship defense happened. The bout took place at the Palestra "Bill Clinton" in Ferizaj, Kosovo. The fight was ruled a split decision draw, with one scorecard of 97–94 in her favor and one scorecard of 97–96 for her opponent. The third judge scored the bout a 96–96 draw. Bytyqi won a rematch with Lopez Corzo held at Sono Centrum, Brno, Czech Republic on 15 April 2023 by unanimous decision.

Bytyqi lost her title to Tina Rupprecht via unanimous decision in a fight at Verti Music Hall, Friedrichshain, Germany on 13 January 2024.

=== IBF Atomweight title challenge ===
Bytyqi was scheduled to challenge IBF female atomweight World champion Sumire Yamanaka at Olympiastuetzpunkt, Heidelberg in Germany on 23 November 2024. The bout was cancelled after Bytyqi collapsed due to dehydration on the day of the weigh-in.

== Professional boxing record ==
27 fights	22 wins	3 losses
By knockout	5	0
By decision	17	3
Draws	2	

No.	Result	Record	Opponent	Type	Round, time	Date	Location	Notes
27	Loss	22–3–2	Francesca Hennessy	UD	10	29 Nov 2025	Vaillant Live, Derby, England	For vacant WBC International female bantamweight title
26	Loss	22–2–2	Seren Cetin	UD	10	12 Sep 2025	Orka World Hotel, Fethiye, Turkey	
25	Win	22–1–2	Jane Kavulani	UD	6	27 Apr 2025	Lucerna Hall, Prague, Czech Republic	
24	Win	21–1–2	Judit Hachbold	UD	6	3 Aug 2024	Letni Kino, Ústí nad Labem, Czech Republic	
23	Loss	20–1–2	Tina Rupprecht	UD	10	13 Jan 2024	Verti Music Hall, Friedrichshain, Germany	Lost WBC female atomweight title
22	Win	20–0–2	Elizabeth Lopez Corzo	UD	10	15 Apr 2023	Sono Centrum, Brno, Czech Republic	Retained WBC female atomweight title
21	Draw	19–0–2	Elizabeth Lopez Corzo	SD	10	29 Jul 2022	Palestra "Bill Clinton", Ferizaj, Kosovo	Retained WBC female atomweight title
20	Win	19–0–1	Ivanka Ivanova	UD	6	5 Mar 2022	Sono Centrum, Brno, Czech Republic	
19	Win	18–0–1	Fara El Bousairi	MD	6	2 Oct 2021	Hotel Větruše, Ústí nad Labem, Czech Republic	
18	Win	17–0–1	Judit Hachbold	UD	6	27 Feb 2021	Hotel Větruše, Ústí nad Labem, Czech Republic	
17	Win	16–0–1	Claudia Ferenczi	UD	8	25 Sep 2020	Sportcentrum Sluneta, Ústí nad Labem, Czech Republic	
16	Win	15–0–1	Ana Arrazola	UD	10	30 Nov 2019	Sportovni Hala Kladno, Kladno, Czech Republic	Retained WBC female atomweight title
15	Draw	14–0–1	Soledad Vargas	SD	10	6 Apr 2019	Sportcentrum Sluneta, Ústí nad Labem, Czech Republic	Retained WBC female atomweight title
14	Win	14–0	Denise Castle	UD	10	22 Sep 2018	Sportcentrum Sluneta, Ústí nad Labem, Czech Republic	Won vacant WBC female atomweight title
13	Win	13–0	Teona Pirosmanashvili	TKO	1 (6), 0:40	9 Jun 2018	Kohlrabizirkus, Leipzig, Germany	
12	Win	12–0	Fatuma Yazidu	TKO	2 (10), 1:50	2 Dec 2017	Sportcentrum Sluneta, Ústí nad Labem, Czech Republic	Won vacant WBC Silver female mini-flyweight title
11	Win	11–0	Luisana Bolívar	UD	10	30 Sep 2017	Maritim Hotel, Magdeburg, Germany	Retained WBC Youth female mini-flyweight title
10	Win	10–0	Evgeniya Zablotskaya	UD	10	11 Mar 2017	Královka Arena, Prague, Czech Republic	
9	Win	9–0	Halima Vunjabei	UD	10	19 Nov 2016	Grandhotel Pupp, Karlovy Vary, Czech Republic	Retained WBC Youth female mini-flyweight title
8	Win	8–0	Teodora Bacheva	RTD	7 (10), 2:00	25 Jun 2016	Sportcentrum Sluneta, Ústí nad Labem, Czech Republic	Retained WBC Youth female mini-flyweight title
7	Win	7–0	Teodora Bacheva	UD	10	5 Mar 2016	Home Monitoring Aréna, Plzeň, Czech Republic	Won vacant WBC Youth female mini-flyweight title
6	Win	6–0	Claudia Ferenczi	UD	6	9 Jan 2016	Maritim Hotel, Berlin, Germany	
5	Win	5–0	Teodora Bacheva	SD	6	14 Nov 2015	Anhalt Arena, Dessau, Germany	
4	Win	4–0	Maribel de Sousa	UD	6	12 Sep 2015	Sportcentrum Sluneta, Ústí nad Labem, Czech Republic	
3	Win	3–0	Gloria Vasileva	UD	6	13 Jun 2015	Hospůdka Eden, Ústí nad Labem, Czech Republic	
2	Win	2–0	Agnes Draxler	TKO	2 (4), 1:40	11 Apr 2015	Sportcentrum Sluneta, Ústí nad Labem, Czech Republic	
1	Win	1–0	Andrea Jenei	TKO	4 (4), 1:48	7 Mar 2015	Maritim Hotel, Magdeburg, Germany	

== See also ==
- List of WBC Female World Champions
- Fabiana Richter at BoxRec (registration required)
