= Yunoka Furukawa =

Japanese boxer (born 1994)

Yunoka Furukawa 古川湯の香
Personal information
- Born: 24 May 1994 (age 32) Ichinomiya, Aichi, Japan
- Height: 5 ft 2 in (157 cm)
- Weight: Atomweight; Mini-flyweight; Light-flyweight; Flyweight; Super-flyweight; Bantamweight

Boxing career
- Stance: Orthodox

Boxing record
- Total fights: 16
- Wins: 11
- Win by KO: 7
- Losses: 3
- Draws: 2

Yunoka Furukawa (古川湯の香, Furukawa Yunoka; born 24 May 1994) is a Japanese professional boxer who held the WBA female atomweight title from 2016 to 2017.

== Professional career ==
Furukawa made her professional debut on 1 April 2012, drawing with fellow Japanese boxer Misato Kawaguchi. She would amass a record of 6–1–1 over the next four years before challenging Christine Latube for the vacant OPBF female flyweight title. She would win the bout and capture the title via technical knockout in the seventh round.

Furukawa challenged Satoshi Nishimura for the vacant WBA female atomweight title on 13 August 2016. She would claim her first world title by technical knockout in the third round. She would then successfully defend her title against Mika Iwakawa before being stripped of the title after deciding to move up to flyweight.

After her move to flyweight, Furukawa challenged Leonela Paola Yúdica for the IBF female flyweight title on 13 October 2017. She would lose by unanimous decision.

== Professional boxing record ==
| 16 fights | 11 wins | 3 losses |
|---|---|---|
| By knockout | 7 | 0 |
| By decision | 4 | 3 |
| Draws | 2 | |

| No. | Result | Record | Opponent | Type | Round, time | Date | Location | Notes |
|---|---|---|---|---|---|---|---|---|
| 16 | Win | 11–3–2 | Wassana Kamdee | TKO | 4 (10), 1:18 | 25 May 2023 | Wat Pak Bo School, Bangkok, Thailand | Won vacant WBC International female mini-flyweight title |
| 15 | Win | 10–3–2 | Mont Blanc Miki | UD | 6 | 30 Nov 2022 | Korakuen Hall, Tokyo, Japan | |
| 14 | Loss | 9–3–2 | Michiko Abiru | MD | 6 | 22 Jun 2022 | Korakuen Hall, Tokyo, Japan | |
| 13 | Loss | 9–2–2 | Leonela Paola Yúdica | UD | 10 | 13 Oct 2017 | Estadio Aldo Cantoni, San Juan, Argentina | For IBF female flyweight title |
| 12 | Win | 9–1–2 | Mika Iwakawa | MD | 10 | 13 Dec 2016 | Korakuen Hall, Tokyo, Japan | Retained WBA female atomweight title |
| 11 | Win | 8–1–2 | Satomi Nishimura | TKO | 3 (10), 1:59 | 13 Aug 2016 | City Culture Hall, Sōka, Japan | Won vacant WBA female atomweight title |
| 10 | Win | 7–1–2 | Christine Latube | TKO | 7 (8), 1:46 | 21 Feb 2016 | Meenayothin Camp, Bangkok, Thailand | Won vacant OPBF female flyweight title |
| 9 | Win | 6–1–2 | Kanittha Ninthim | TKO | 6 (6), 0:53 | 28 Sep 2015 | Meenayothin Camp, Bangkok, Thailand | |
| 8 | Win | 5–1–2 | Aiko Yamagishi | TKO | 4 (6) | 10 Feb 2015 | Korakuen Hall, Tokyo, Japan | |
| 7 | Win | 4–1–2 | Mikiko Muto | UD | 4 | 9 Dec 2014 | Korakuen Hall, Tokyo, Japan | |
| 6 | Win | 3–1–2 | Chisa Tanaka | UD | 4 | 11 Jul 2014 | Korakuen Hall, Tokyo, Japan | |
| 5 | Win | 2–1–2 | Marina Isami | TKO | 2 (4) | 3 Mar 2014 | Korakuen Hall, Tokyo, Japan | |
| 4 | Draw | 1–1–2 | Shoko Hayashida | MD | 4 | 30 Aug 2013 | Korakuen Hall, Tokyo, Japan | |
| 3 | Win | 1–1–1 | Kumi Oishi | TKO | 1 (4) | 18 Dec 2012 | Korakuen Hall, Tokyo, Japan | |
| 2 | Loss | 0–1–1 | Kei Takenaka | UD | 4 | 16 Sep 2012 | Yomiuri Bunka Hall, Toyonaka, Japan | |
| 1 | Draw | 0–0–1 | Misato Kawaguchi | SD | 4 | 1 Apr 2012 | Aioi Hall, Kariya, Japan | |

== See also ==
- List of female boxers
- Boxing in Japan
- List of Japanese boxing world champions
