= Sumire Yamanaka =

Japanese boxer (born 2001)

Sumire Yamanaka 山中菫
Personal information
- Born: 20 November 2001 (age 25) Sakai, Osaka, Japan
- Height: 146 cm (4 ft 9 in)
- Weight: Atomweight; Mini-flyweight

Boxing career
- Reach: 148 cm (58 in)
- Stance: Southpaw

Boxing record
- Total fights: 12
- Wins: 10
- Win by KO: 3
- Losses: 2

Sumire Yamanaka (山中菫, Yamanaka Sumire; born 20 November 2001) is a Japanese professional boxer. She has twice held the IBF female atomweight title.

== Professional career ==
Yamanaka made her professional boxing debut on 13 December 2020, scoring a unanimous decision win over Arika Shimono at Edion Arena in Osaka.

She won the vacant WBO Asia Pacific 102-pound belt by stopping Honoka Kano in the fifth round of their bout at Tokyo's Korakuen Hall on 1 September 2022.

On 12 January 2024, Yamanaka captured the IBF female atomweight title with a unanimous decision success against defending champion Mika Iwakawa also at Korakuen Hall.

Yamanaka was scheduled to make the first defense of her title against former WBC female atomweight champion Fabiana Bytyqi at Olympiastuetzpunkt in Heidelberg, Germany, on 23 November 2024. The bout was cancelled after Bytyqi collapsed due to dehydration on the day of the weigh-in.

She faced WBC, WBA and WBO female atomweight title holder Tina Rupprecht in a contest to crown an undisputed champion for the division at the MBS Arena in Potsdam, Germany, on 5 April 2025. Yamanaka lost by majority decision with two of the ringside judges scoring the contest 99–91 and 96–95 respectively for her opponent, while the third had it a 95–95 draw.

Yamanaka became a two-time IBF female atomweight champion when she defeated the previously unbeaten Nao Ugawa via split decision for the vacant title at Korakuen Hall in Tokyo on 7 April 2026. Two of the judges awarded her the fight 97–93 and 96–94 respectively, overruling the third who gave it 96–94 for her opponent.

On 21 November 2026, she faced WBA female atomweight champion Isabel Rivero in a title unification bout at Plaza de Toros in Illescas, Castilla–La Mancha, Spain. Yamanaka lost by unanimous decision.

== Personal life ==
Sumire is the younger sister of former WBO mini-flyweight world champion Ryuya Yamanaka.

== Professional boxing record ==
12 fights	10 wins	2 losses
By knockout	3	0
By decision	7	2

No.	Result	Record	Opponent	Type	Round, time	Date	Location	Notes
12	Loss	10–2	Isabel Rivero	UD	10	21 Nov 2026	Plaza de Toros, Illescas, Castilla–La Mancha, Spain	Lost IBF female atomweight title; for WBA female atomweight title
11	Win	10–1	Nao Ugawa	SD	10	7 Apr 2026	Korakuen Hall, Tokyo, Japan	Won vacant IBF female atomweight title
10	Win	9–1	Megumi Watanabe	UD	8	25 Oct 2025	EDION Arena, Osaka, Japan	
9	Loss	8–1	Tina Rupprecht	MD	10	5 Apr 2025	MBS Arena, Potsdam, Germany	Lost IBF female atomweight title; For WBA, WBC, WBO, and The Ring female atomweight titles
8	Win	8–0	Mika Iwakawa	UD	10	12 Jan 2024	Korakuen Hall, Tokyo, Japan	Won IBF female atomweight title
7	Win	7–0	Pimchanok Thepjanda	TKO	3 (8), 0:59	15 Apr 2023	EDION Arena, Osaka, Japan	Retained WBO Asia Pacific female atomweight title
6	Win	6–0	Honoka Kano	TKO	5 (8), 1:56	1 Sep 2022	Korakuen Hall, Tokyo, Japan	Won vacant WBO Asia Pacific female atomweight title
5	Win	5–0	Pichada Bunmee	TKO	3 (6), 1:36	28 May 2022	Singmanassak Muaythai School, Pathum Thani, Thailand	
4	Win	4–0	Natsuki Tarui	SD	4	26 Nov 2021	EDION Arena, Osaka, Japan	
3	Win	3–0	Rin Murai	UD	4	11 Aug 2021	EDION Arena, Osaka, Japan	
2	Win	2–0	Natsuki Yamada	MD	4	4 Apr 2021	Sangyo Shinko Center, Sakai, Japan	
1	Win	1–0	Arika Shimono	UD	4	13 Dec 2020	EDION Arena, Osaka, Japan	
