= Henry Raup Wagner =

American book collector

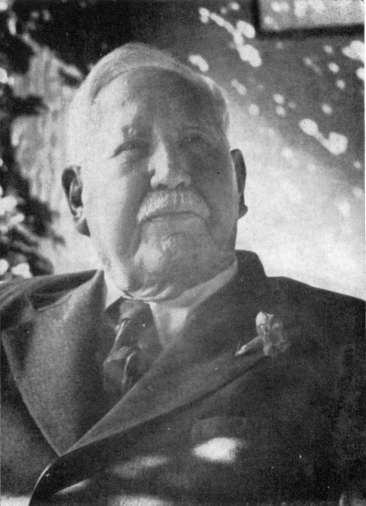
Wagner in 1951, on his 89th birthday.

Henry Raup Wagner (September 27, 1862 – March 27, 1957) was an American book collector, bibliographer, cartographer, historian, and business executive. He was the author of over 170 publications, including books and scholarly essays, mainly about the histories of the American frontier and the Spanish exploration and colonization of Mexico. He also assembled tens of thousands of books and manuscripts and formed several collections from them.

Wagner was born in Philadelphia, Pennsylvania, on September 27, 1862. He graduated from Yale University in 1884 and then from Yale Law School in 1886. He went west and began settling in places like Kansas City and then Denver, where he became involved in the mining business. One of his first employers was the Globe Smelting and Refining Company. In 1892 they assigned him to Mexico where he began collecting books on metallurgy and became interested in the history of the region. From 1898, he began working for the Guggenheim family, who transferred him to Chile and then to New York. In 1903, he became the manager of their London office where he collected many more books on different subjects, including South American history and economics. The latter became the subject of his first bibliography, Irish Economics: 1700–1783. From 1906 to 1915, he managed the Guggenheims' affairs in Mexico, and was then transferred to Chile where he studied in writer José Toribio Medina's residence. By then Wagner was transitioning from book collecting to research and writing, and sold his large Mexican collection to the Yale University Library.

He published The Plains and the Rockies in 1920 and quit his job the following year. Wagner helped revive the California Historical Society in 1922 and sold his last major book collection that year to the Huntington Library. The Spanish Southwest, 1542–1794 was published in 1924, and Sir Francis Drake's Voyage Around the World, Its Aims and Achievements in 1926. He became interested in cartography around that time and worked for several years on that subject. The Cartography of the Northwest Coast of America to the Year 1800 was published in 1937. Later, between 1942 and 1944, Wagner wrote a series of books on 16th century Spanish conquistadors, notably Hernán Cortés who was the subject of The Rise of Fernando Cortés.

Wagner married Blanche Henriette Collet in 1917. They initially settled in Berkeley, California, but after 1928 they lived in San Marino, California. He died on March 27, 1957, aged 94. The California Historical Society established the Henry R. Wagner Memorial Award in 1959.

== Early life and book collecting ==
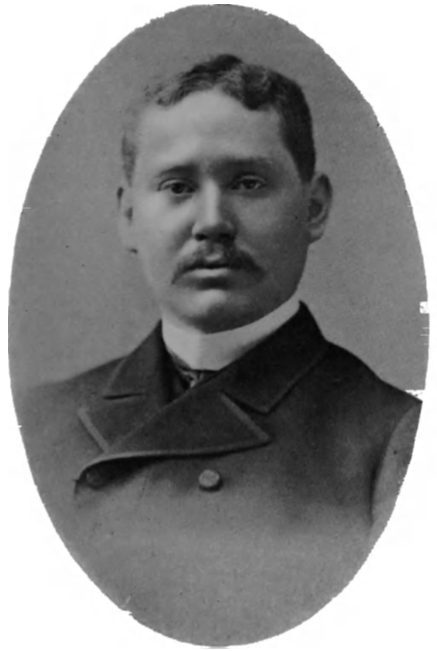
A photo portrait of Wagner from a 1914 book dedicated to the Yale class of 1884.

Wagner was born on September 27, 1862, in Philadelphia, Pennsylvania, and attended Friends High School there. His father, Jacob Frederick Wagner, was a businessman of Pennsylvania Dutch ancestry; his mother, Eliza Kemp, was of English ancestry. He graduated from Yale University in 1884 and from Yale Law School in 1886. His father supported him financially, throughout his studies and afterwards, until the family lost its fortune in the Panic of 1893. Upon graduating, Wagner traveled west over the years that followed to places like Missouri, Colorado and New Mexico. His first major stop was Kansas City, Missouri, where he became interested in the ore mining business and the history of the American frontier. He later went to Denver to study the subject further. He collected mining statistics on the Comstock Lode for mining engineer Rossiter W. Raymond, a task that required him to travel to Virginia City, Nevada, and later to New York. Wagner then worked for the Denver-based Globe Smelting and Refining Company.

He traveled twice to Mexico between 1892 and 1893 while working for Globe. His first major book collection began during his first Mexican trip with a few works on metallurgy. He then worked there from 1894 for the equipment manufacturer Edward P. Allis Company. He managed one of its offices in Mexico while moving from place to place in the western United States from 1895 to 1898. During his stays in Durango and Zacatecas, Mexico, Wagner became interested in the history of the earlier forms of precious metal ore extraction in New Spain and began collecting books on the subject. His collection later included works on the general contributions of Spain to the New World. Among Wagner's stops on the west coast during his Mexican assignment were Seattle, at the beginning of the Klondike Gold Rush, and British Columbia. From 1898, he began working as an ore buyer for the Guggenheim family, representing their interests in Chile for four years and in New York after that. In 1902, Daniel Guggenheim appointed him manager of the London office of the American Smelting and Refining Company (ASARCO), then under partial Guggenheim control. Wagner moved to the British capital in 1903 with his mother, who often traveled with him, and stayed with her in a house which she had helped secure. There, he collected many more books as a result of his frequent visits to book shops and auction halls. His London collections included works on the histories of Chile and Peru, mining, metallurgy, and economics. Economics attracted his attention at the time and contributed to his first bibliography, Irish Economics: 1700–1783, a Bibliography with Notes, which he privately printed in 1907. He had gathered up to 6,000 volumes about economics by the time he left England. He later gave this collection of works on Irish economics to the Yale University Library.

Wagner left London in 1906. ASARCO transferred him to Mexico and ran the company's affairs in that country from its regional office El Paso, Texas. He traveled frequently to central Mexico during the first few years and collected many more books on the history and literature of Mexico, and on South America. He relocated to Mexico City in 1910, a year that also marked the beginning of the Mexican Revolution. He witnessed some of the events that unfolded during that period and got to know many revolutionary leaders, including Pancho Villa. In 1915, Wagner moved to the Chilean capital, Santiago, as part of a two-year contract with the Guggenheims to run their affairs there. That year he also sold Yale's library his extensive Mexican collection for $20,000. The part of it relating to South America alone had up to 7,000 volumes, mainly on Chile.

== Shift to literary career ==
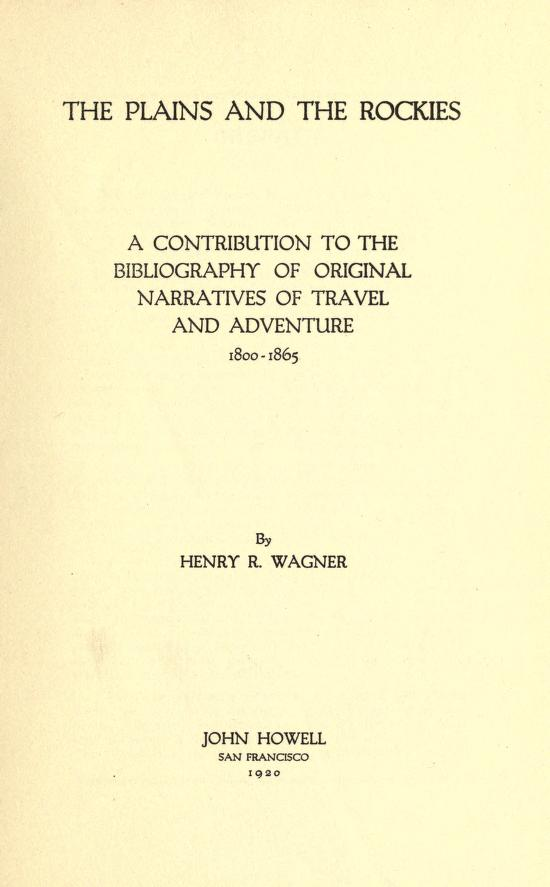
The Plains and the Rockies, 1920

Wagner continued to collect books during his stay in Chile. He spent considerable time in the residence of Chilean bibliographer José Toribio Medina, time described by George P. Hammond in his obituary on Wagner as "some of his most pleasant hours". In 1918 he decided to devote most of his attention to writing on the subject of exploration in the Great Plains and Rocky Mountains. His research later materialized in one of his notable works, The Plains and the Rockies. First published in 1920, it quickly had an impact on the pricing and quality of books on that topic. As he became more interested in history, Wagner considered detaching himself entirely from the Guggenheims' business world. He eventually quit his job in 1921 to dedicate most his time to historical research. According to Charles Lewis Camp, in 1922 Wagner played an important role in the revival of the California Historical Society, which had been defunct since the 1906 San Francisco earthquake. He also founded its principal publication, the California Historical Society Quarterly. This gradual shift from one preoccupation to another coincided with a transition from book collecting to full-time research and writing. Yale's library bought his Texas and mid-west collections of over 2,000 works in 1919. In 1922 he sold the Huntington Library his last major collections on California. It had formed the basis of his California Imprints August 1846 June 1851 published that same year. He continued the practice of buying and selling old works, however, though to a lesser extent. Wagner then went on to complete The Spanish Southwest, 1542–1794, an Annotated Bibliography, inspired by his studies and findings in Medina's residence in Chile, which was published in 1924.

Around the same time he became interested in cartography and wrote an essay for the Quarterly on that subject in 1924. He also finished working on Sir Francis Drake's Voyage Around the World, Its Aims and Achievements, a book published in 1926 which he referred to as his "first love", according to Thomas W. Streeter. It was one of the most extensive collections of material on Francis Drake's circumnavigation of the world in the 16th century. In it Wagner tried to debunk some of the common contemporary misconceptions about the nature of Drake's expedition. He later became skeptical of Drake's Plate of Brass, a hoax that appeared in the 1930s. He took up the matter in person with historian Herbert Eugene Bolton, who had authenticated the plate and was at the center of the controversy surrounding it. Wagner then resumed his cartographic work. From 1927 onward, he wrote a series of seven essays for the Quarterly that consist mainly of translations of Spanish exploration logs about the western coasts of North America. These make up his Spanish Voyages to the Northwest Coast of America in the Sixteenth Century, published by the same journal in 1929. His studies on that topic eventually culminated with The Cartography of the Northwest Coast of America to the Year 1800 published by the University of California Press in 1937. It contained a lot of new information with hundreds of maps and is based largely on original sources. Later, returning to the subject of western printing and its history, he finished Mexican Imprints, 1544–1600 in 1939. That year he also printed the Spanish edition of his 1935 English language supplement to Joaquín García Icazbalceta's 1886 book, Bibliografia Mexicana del Siglo XIV. Wagner was an admirer of the Bibliografia and was contacted by a relative of Icazbalceta's who offered to help him with the translation. In 1942, the Cortés Society published Wagner's first two volumes in a series on Spanish conquistadors in the New World. The books covered Francisco Hernández de Córdoba and Juan de Grijalva respectively. In 1944 the Society published The Rise of Fernando Cortés, a detailed examination of the life of Hernán Cortés and his campaigns against the Aztec Empire. His Supplement to Icazbalceta's bibliography was eventually published in Mexico, in 1946, under the title Nueva Bibliografía Mexicana del Siglo XVI Suplemento a las Bibliografías de Don Joaquin García Icazbalceta, Don José Toribio Medina y Don Nicolás León. Peter Pond, Yankee Fur Trader and Explorer, published in 1955, was one of Wagner's last books printed before his death. According to his associate Ruth Frey Axe, he thought highly of, and worked "unceasingly for twenty years" on The Life and Writings of Bartolomé de las Casas. It was published posthumously in 1967.

== Personal life and death ==
Upon returning from Chile, Wagner married Blanche Henriette Collet, a French painter, at a ceremony in Oakland on July 17, 1917, after which they settled in a house they had purchased in Berkeley, California. The couple stayed temporarily in New York from 1919 when Wagner was still working for the Guggenheims. They returned shortly afterwards to Berkeley where they lived until 1928, after which they moved to San Marino, California. Wagner gradually lost his eyesight during his final years but continued his research nonetheless with the assistance of Axe.

He died on March 27, 1957, in San Marino aged 94. His wife, Collet, died a few weeks later on May 16.

== Achievements and legacy ==
Wagner is credited with 177 publications, as of Axe's 1968 update to the list of his published works. These include books and articles, most of which are compiled in three bibliographies of his work published during his lifetime. Two of these, published in 1934 and 1955, are both titled The Published Writings of Henry R. Wagner. The latter was published by the Zamorano Club and lists 167 titles. Another bibliography came in the form of a "Check List" at the end of his 1942 autobiography, Bullion to Books. In addition to those published pieces, many unpublished bibliographical and cartographic documents went to the Yale University Library over a fifty-year period. These included notes and correspondences with scholars, book collectors and learning institutions. Axe expected more works would be published in the years following her 1968 update.

In Sixty Years of Book Collecting, his autobiography published by the Zamorano Club in 1952, Wagner states that he owned up to 100,000 books and documents at various points in his life. These included about 600 works on metallurgy, about 10,000 on economics, and between 12- 13,000 works on the histories of Mexico and Texas, among others in his earlier collections.

In 1971, Archibald Hanna Jr., curator of the "Western Americana" section at the Beinecke Rare Book & Manuscript Library of Yale, wrote the following about Wagner's book collecting: "If Bancroft was in a sense the grandfather of western Americana collecting, the father was undoubtedly Henry Raup Wagner."

Wagner was granted fellowship by the Royal Geographical Society and received honorary degrees at Pomona College in 1935, Yale University in 1946, and the University of California in 1949. He became a member of or helped found different historical societies and bibliophile clubs including: the California Historical Society, the Bibliographical Society of America, the American Antiquarian Society, the Grolier Club, the Book Club of California and the Zamorano Club, among others. Wagner also presided over the Historical Society of Southern California in 1933–34.

The California Historical Society established the Henry R. Wagner Memorial Award, its highest accolade, in 1959. It consists of a gold medal with Wagner's profile and is presented annually by a Wagner Awards Committee to individuals who have accomplished works relating to history, cartography and bibliography within the two years preceding the handing over ceremony. Its first recipient was Carl Irving Wheat, and then over the years to individuals like Dale Morgan in 1961, and George R. Stewart (tied) in 1972, among others. On the one hundredth anniversary of Wagner's birth in 1962, Thomas Streeter received the award for his Bibliography of Texas 1795–1845, which he had dedicated to Wagner, referring to him as "The Old Master".

== Sources ==
- Axe, Ruth F. (1957). "Blanche Collet Wagner". California Historical Society Quarterly. 36 (2): 185–186. doi:10.2307/25155125. JSTOR 25155125.
- Axe, Ruth F. (1968). "More Published Writings of Henry R. Wagner, including Tributes and Bibliographies". California Historical Society Quarterly. 47 (3): 273–284. doi:10.2307/25154302. JSTOR 25154302.
- Camp, Charles L. (1957). "Our Founder, Henry R. Wagner, is Dead". California Historical Society Quarterly. 36 (1): 79–82. doi:10.2307/25155102. JSTOR 25155102.
- Colston, Stephen A. (2015). ""Looked to Me Like a Good Investment": The Evolution of Henry Wagner's The Plains and the Rockies and His Collection of Western Americana". Great Plains Quarterly. 35 (2): 181–202. doi:10.1353/gpq.2015.0031. S2CID 161541974.
- Daggett, Leonard M., ed. (1914). A History of the Class of Eighty Four: Yale College 1880-1914. New Haven, published for the class.
- Dunne, Peter M. (1945). "Review of The Rise of Fernando Cortés". Pacific Historical Review. 14 (1): 83–84. doi:10.2307/3634517. JSTOR 3634517.
- Graff, Everett D. (1962). "Introduction". In Newberry Library (ed.). Henry Raup Wagner, 1862-1957: an exhibition of rare books honoring the centenary of his birth. Chicago.
- Hammond, George P.; Patterson, Jerry E. (1957). "Henry Raup Wagner, 1862-1957". The Hispanic American Historical Review. 37 (4): 486–494. doi:10.1215/00182168-37.4.486. JSTOR 2509737.
- Hammond, George P.; Streeter, Thomas W. (1962). "Wagner Memorial Award". California Historical Society Quarterly. 41 (4): 368–373. JSTOR 43773380.
- Hoy, Edwin P. (1967). The Guggenheims and the American Dream. Funk & Wagnalls.
- Hunt, Rockwell D. (1951). "Five Centuries: Five Decisive Events". The Historical Society of Southern California Quarterly. 33 (4): 285–290. doi:10.2307/41169675. JSTOR 41169675.
- Karel, David (1992). Dictionnaire des artistes de langue française en Amérique du Nord: peintres, sculpteurs, dessinateurs, graveurs, photographes, et orfèvres. Presses Université Laval. ISBN 9782763772356.
- Nuttall, Zelia (1928). "Review of Sir Francis Drake's Voyage around the World, its Aims and Achievements". The American Historical Review. 34 (1): 114–117. doi:10.1086/ahr/34.1.114.
- Streeter, Thomas W. (1957). "Henry R. Wagner, Collector, Bibliographer, Cartographer and Historian". California Historical Society Quarterly. 36 (2): 165–175. doi:10.2307/25155117. JSTOR 25155117.
- Wroth, Lawrence C (1927). "Review of Sir Francis Drake's Voyage around the World, Its Aims and Achievements". California Historical Society Quarterly. 6 (1): 93–95. doi:10.2307/25177867. JSTOR 25177867.
- "Historical Society Honors Two California Writers". Vol. 21, no. 19. University Bulletin: A Weekly Bulletin for the Staff of the University of California. February 5, 1973.
