= Stephen Blumberg =

American book collector and thief

Stephen Carrie Blumberg (born 1948 in Saint Paul, Minnesota) is best known as a bibliomane who lived in Ottumwa, Iowa. After being arrested for stealing more than 23,600 books worth US$5.3 million in 1990 (equivalent to about $13M in 2025), he became known as the Book Bandit and was recognized as the most successful book thief in the history of the United States.

== Early life ==
Blumberg lived on a $72,000 annual family trust fund. His compulsion to collect books developed in childhood when he became interested in many of the beautiful, but run-down Victorian homes in St. Paul he walked past on his way to school. Blumberg began removing doorknobs and stained glass windows from the old houses that were slated for destruction as part of a revitalization project in St. Paul. Blumberg amassed hundreds of these items during the course of his collecting years in addition to the books. His initial interest in Victorian architecture brought him into the rare-books stacks at the University of Minnesota. Blumberg initially took items as a way to create a reference collection for his own use.

== Arrest and trial ==
At 2:00 am on March 20, 1990, Stephen Blumberg was arrested for stealing more than 23,600 rare, valuable and assorted other books from 268 or more universities and museums in 45 states, two Canadian provinces, and Washington, D.C. Their value was placed at about US$20 million, but was later changed to $5.3 million, the largest book theft in US history. In 1991, Blumberg was found guilty and sentenced to 71 months in prison with a $200,000 fine. On December 29, 1995, he was released from prison. The collection has been referred to as the "Blumberg Collection." The Rare Books and Manuscripts division of the Association of College and Research Libraries as well as library security expert William Andrew Moffett helped the Federal Bureau of Investigation capture and convict Stephen Blumberg and identify the items he had stolen.

Blumberg's arrest came as a result of his friend, Kenneth J. Rhodes, turning him in for a $56,000 bounty he negotiated with the Justice Department. Rhodes and Blumberg had known each other since the mid-1970s. A known criminal, Rhodes accompanied Blumberg on several of his road trip collecting sprees.

During Blumberg's 1991 trial, Dr. William S. Logan, director of the Law and Psychiatry Department at the Menninger Clinic and a recognized authority on forensic psychiatry, revealed that Blumberg had undergone psychiatric treatment for schizophrenic delusions and tendencies. He was hospitalized numerous times during his adolescence where twelve psychiatrists diagnosed him variously as schizophrenic, delusional, paranoid, or compulsive. Dr. Logan also revealed that a history of psychiatric illness plagued Blumberg's family. Dr. Logan reported during the trial that Blumberg intended to preserve or rescue the materials he stole from what he believed was destruction. Blumberg believed that the government was plotting to keep the ordinary person from having access to rare books and unique materials, and so sought to liberate and release them in an attempt to thwart the government plot. Blumberg admitted that he saw himself as a custodian of the things he took. He said he would never sell them because he thought that would be dishonest. He envisioned the items would be returned to the rightful owners after his death, or at least to another repository that could care for them. Despite these claims, Blumberg was convicted in 1991 as guilty, without reason of insanity. After serving a 4 1/2-year sentence, Blumberg was released and resumed his collecting and stealing habits.

Upon meeting Blumberg in the FBI's stacks after his arrest, John L. Sharpe III from Duke University's library commented about his brief conversation with Blumberg that,

What I felt...was that we in libraries have to operate on a trust system every time we bring a book to someone's table. This is what I think is so sinister about the whole thing. This man chose to debase that, to debase that commodity that is so essential in gathering information in an open institution. And I think he betrayed everything that we try to represent in making information available as freely and as uninhibitedly as possible. And I think that's what really just enraged me, to think that this man took advantage of that kind of access.(511)

In 1997, Blumberg was convicted again of burglary of antiques. He was again arrested in July 2003 for burglary of a house in Keokuk, Iowa. He was subsequently convicted in early-2004. He was again arrested in June 2004 for burglary in Knoxville, Illinois. This violated his probation for the 2004 conviction in Keokuk, Iowa, for which he was again arrested.

== Collection ==
Some of the more precious objects Blumberg stole include a first-edition copy of Harriet Beecher Stowe's Uncle Tom's Cabin; A Confession of Faith, the first book published in Connecticut; 25 boxes of rare materials outlining the early history of Oregon; and the Bishops' Bible, a 16th-century volume. Blumberg claimed he put together 100 incunabula in three years, including the 1493 Nuremberg Chronicle bound in ivory calfskin. He also attempted to collect the full Zamorano 80, a list of rare books established in 1945 by a group of prominent book collectors in a Los Angeles book club named after Don Augustin Zamorano, California's first printer.
