= William Andrew Moffett =

American librarian

- Born: January 25, 1933; Charlotte, North Carolina, US
- Died: February 20, 1995 (aged 62); Pasadena, California, US
- Occupations: Librarian, professor
- Parent(s): Alfred Nisbit Moffett and Mary Elisabeth (McLean) Moffett

William Andrew Moffett (January 25, 1933 – February 20, 1995) was a historian and librarian who was named on the list of the "100 of the Most Important Leaders We Had in the 20th Century" by American Libraries in 1999. He is primarily known for aiding in the capture of a prolific library thief, James Richard Shinn, and, more famously, opening access of the Dead Sea Scrolls for scholarly use, both of which news stories made the front page of the New York Times. Moffett was also known for being a highly influential academic librarian director at Oberlin College, the 6th Librarian at the Huntington Library and for being named Academic/Research Librarian of the Year in 1993 by the Association of College and Research Libraries (ACRL).

== Early life and career ==
William Moffett was born on January 25, 1933, in Charlotte, North Carolina. He was traditionally educated in Mississippi and finished his schooling at the Chamberlain-Hunt Academy. From there, Moffett went on to pursue a collegiate academic path in history, earning an A.B. degree from Davidson College as well as going on to pursue higher education at Duke University where he earned a M.A. degree and Ph.D. degree in English history.

Between 1956 and 1974 Moffett was an educator at various institutions, including Alma College and Charlotte Country Day School. While working as an assistant professor at the University of Massachusetts Boston William became involved in several roles at the campus' library that influenced him to go and earn a Master of Library Science from Simmons College in Boston. Moffett eventually moved on from a lack of teaching opportunities to a newly burgeoning field in libraries, a field which would define the remainder of his career. He first worked as an academic librarian at the Crumb Library of the State University of New York (SUNY) College at Potsdam. Here he combined his past experiences in education with librarianship, incorporating library instruction at the university.

== Oberlin College and Library Security ==
Eventually, Moffett moved to a new post at Oberlin College where from 1979 to 1990 he occupied the position of Azariah Smith Root Director of Libraries. During this time, he embraced the emergence of technology, being the first library to install the online catalog of the Online Computer Library Center. He was also very invested in taking steps to make the library the heart of the Oberlin campus. Much to his colleagues' dismay Moffett was well known to be persnickety about furniture placement in order to create an inviting environment for library patrons.

William Andrew Moffett's name rose to fame in April 1981 when he helped capture a renowned book thief who was discovered to have stolen $50,000 worth of material from various libraries. Library security was an ongoing passion for Moffett as he came to be known as a specialist in the field. He worked to establish the Rare Books and Manuscripts (RBMS) division of the ACRL which was a pioneering organization in library security, helping to connect institutions and warn of potential and reoccurring thefts. The RBMS, as well as Moffett's expertise in the field of library security, helped the Federal Bureau of Investigation to capture and convict Stephen Blumberg in one of the largest cases of library theft in modern history. Moffett shared the credit for the book thief's capture, publishing an editorial and giving detailed recognition to his peers who had helped in the capture in his article "Credit due and overdue".

== Huntington Library and the Dead Sea Scrolls ==
After working for over a decade at Oberlin College, Moffett moved on to become the Director of the Huntington Library in San Marino, California, in 1990. On September 22, 1991, Moffett's name was splashed across newspaper headlines yet again when he announced the Huntington Library's decision to open access to over 3000 photographic negatives of the Dead Sea Scrolls for scholarly use. Israel Antiquities Authority had reserved tight control over who was allowed access to the Scrolls since the discovery of the historic artifacts. Moffett believed that allowing access to the study of such a historic importance was vital and what libraries were all about. Moffett's modest response to being at the head of such a controversial decision was: "I maintain that what we're doing is no more than other librarians are doing ever [sic?] day – collecting, preserving, and providing access".

== Death and legacy ==
Moffett died on February 20, 1995, from cancer of the bladder. His legacy was not just limited to sensational stories found in headlines. His intelligence and charm created a lasting impact on his peers and colleagues. The Association of College and Research Libraries passed a memorial resolution honoring William Moffett upon his death and the auditorium at the Oberlin College Library was named in his honor. Many book funds have been established in his name, including Davidson College, Duke University and the Huntington Library, continuing to honor his legacy and promote Moffett's lifelong passion of education and librarianship.
