= John Shertzer Hittell =

Geologist and mineralogist 1825–1901

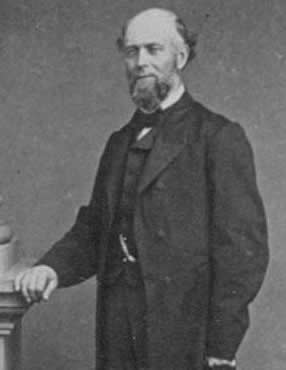
- John Shertzer Hittell
- Born: December 25, 1825; Jonestown, Lebanon County, Pennsylvania, US
- Died: March 8, 1901 (aged 75); San Francisco, California, US
- Education: Miami University
- Occupations: Author, historian
- Relatives: Theodore H. Hittell (brother)

John Shertzer Hittell (J.S. Hittell, December 25, 1825 – March 8, 1901) was an American author, historian, and journalist of the United States during the Golden Age of Free Thought. Hittell wrote on a wide variety of topics including history, mining, Christianity, Pantheism, phrenology, morality, and politics. He is best known for his works A History of The City of San Francisco and Incidentally of the State of California (1878) and The Evidences Against Christianity (1856).

== Life and career ==
=== Early life and education ===
John Shertzer Hittell was born December 25, 1825, in Jonestown, Lebanon County, Pennsylvania to Catherine Mueller Shertzer and Jacob Hittell. Both parents were of German descent in families which came to America long before the American Revolution. His family moved to Hamilton, a town in Southwestern Ohio, in 1832.

His brother Theodore H. Hittell was an author and historian who met and wrote about the life of John "Grizzly" Adams in his book The Adventures of James Capen Adams, Mountaineer and Grizzly Bear Hunter of California.

Starting in 1839, Hittell attended Miami University and learned Latin, Greek, French, Mathematics, Chemistry, and Rhetoric. He obtained a Masters of the Arts degree in 1843. After graduating, Hittell decided to go into Law and entered the office of John Woods, a leading attorney in Hamiltin. His studies were interrupted by dyspepsia and headaches which Hittell attempted to cure by long walks and working on a farm in Hake County, Indiana.

=== Gold mining ===
In the spring of 1849 during the excitement of the gold rush he left the bank of the Missouri River with a company of adventurers en route to California. They arrived at the Sacramento River on Sept. 19. Hittell spent the winter of 1849 and 1850 at Reading's Diggings (Shasta County).

He would go on to write books on mining with Mining in the Pacific states of North America (1861) and Hittel on Gold Mines and Mining (1864) respectively.

=== Move to San Francisco and writings ===
In 1852 Hittell moved to San Francisco and in 1853 joined the editorial staff of the "Alta California", where he remained employed for the following 25 years. Hittell was the author of numerous books concerning California history, resources, and industries.

He became one of the editorial writers of the Alta California newspaper, a position which he held, though not continuously, for more than twenty-four years. He was known as a hard worker and careful student, as was soon recognized as an authority in matters relating to the industries and resources of the State. In 1862 he published a book called "The Resources of California," and the seventh edition of it appeared in 1879. "A History of San Francisco," from his pen, was issued in 1878. Her has written several other books, numbering at least half a dozen, and has contributed much to cyclopedias and magazines. His range of knowledge was wide, including familiarity with the literature and tongues of Germany, France, Spain, and Italy.

He has been credited with being among the group of people to name Lake Tahoe.

Hittell owned land on Mount Diablo in a location known as Deer Flat. In 1873 an entrepreneur known as J.S. Hall, who had owned and conducted the famous Summit and Tip-Top House in Washington, approached Hittell about building a hotel, and constructing a carriage road to the summit of Mount Diablo. The two failed to come to satisfactory terms, with Hall finding a new place for the construction.

In 1867 Hittell filed a patent for a new Washing Machine which he described as "consisting of an upright paddle-wheel common wash-tub, and is much more expeditious than the Wash-board".

=== Works of fiction ===
In 1878 Hittell wrote versions of famous stories, adding in his own characters and plot. These were Regolstein: A Comedy (1878), based on La Grande-Duchesse de Gérolstein and Tannwald: A Drama based on Goethe's Faust by Johann Wolfgang von Goethe.

=== Translations of works by Carl Reichenbach ===
Hittell undertook the first English translations of two works by author Carl Reichenbach. These were Odic-Magnetic Letters and a section of the large work, The Sensitive Man and His Relation to Od, titled Somnambulism and Cramp.

== Religious views and writings ==
Hittell was a known freethinker in the early Freethought movement as well as a Pantheist as described in his book A Plea for Patheism. Of his more well known books is The Evidences Against Christianity.

== Works ==
- The Evidences Against Christianity (Volume 1, Volume 2, 1856)
- A Plea for Pantheism (1857)
- A New System of Phrenology (1857)
- A Brief Statement of the Moral and Legal Merits of the Claim Made by Jos Y (1857)
- Mining in the Pacific states of North America (1861)
- The Resources of California (1863)
- Hittel on Gold Mines and Mining (1864)
- Yosemite: Its Wonders and Its Beauties (1868)
- The Resources of Vallejo (1869)
- All About California, and the Inducements to Settle There (1870)
- A Brief History of Culture (1875)
- A History of The City of San Francisco and Incidentally of the State of California (1878)
- Regolstein: A Comedy (1878) Translated and altered from the French text of the buffoon opera, "The grand duchess of Gerolstein," by H. Meilhac and L. Halevy
- Tannwald: A Drama (1878)
- The Commerce and Industries of the Pacific Coast of North America (1882)
- St. Peter's Catechism (1883)
- Hittell's Hand-Book of Pacific Coast travel (1885)
- A Code of Morals (1888)
- Marshall's Gold Discovery (1893)
- A History of the Mental Growth of Mankind in Ancient Times (1893)
- The Spirit of the Papacy (1895)
- A History of the Mental Growth of Mankind (1899)
- Reform or Revolution? (1900)

== Articles ==
- "The Apotheosis of Steam", in Popular Science Monthly Volume 9, August 1876
- "San Francisco" in The American Cyclopædia, 1879.
