= Harrison Clifford Dale =

Harrison Clifford Dale was a professor and author in the United States who served as the ninth president of the University of Idaho from 1937 to 1946. He was a great-grandson of Stephen Worthen who served in Timothy Barnard's Company in the Massachusetts militia.

== Early life and education ==
Dale was born in Lynn, Massachusetts, where he attended Classical High School. In 1916 he married Bertha May Garrard.

== Career ==
He was a professor at the University of Wyoming. In 1918 he gave a speech about patriotism. He was an assistant professor at the Agricultural College of Utah.

Dale wrote a book about the Ashley-Smith Expeditions. The book is part of the Zamorano Eighty.

He was a professor at the University of Idaho. He was also a professor at Washington University in St. Louis. He served as President of the University of Idaho and was photographed with Eleanor Roosevelt. Dale wrote the article "The Frankfurt Book Fair".
