= Leonela Paola Yúdica =

Argentine boxer (born 1988)

Personal information
- Born: 18 September 1988 (age 37) Santa Lucía, San Juan, Argentina
- Weight: Flyweight

Boxing career

Boxing record
- Total fights: 27
- Wins: 20
- Win by KO: 1
- Losses: 2
- Draws: 4
- No contests: 1

Leonela Paola Yúdica Andino (born 18 September 1988) is an Argentine professional boxer who is a former IBF female flyweight World champion.

== Career ==
Yúdica made her professional boxing debut on 21 April 2012, beating Soledad del Valle Frias by unanimous decision.

On 19 December 2014, she captured the IBF female flyweight title against Gabriela Bouvier on a split decision, the judges' scores being 97–93, 97–93 and 94–96.

Yúdica retained the world title on 30 March 2015 when she drew with Vanesa Lorena Taborda in a fight where both fighters lost a point for fouling. She retained the title in seven subsequent matches, all of which were held at Estadio Aldo Cantoni, in San Juan. Her four title defences after the Taborda fight were all won by unanimous decision; against Tyrieshia Douglas in July 2015; Soledad del Valle Frias in April 2016; Carolina Álvarez in March 2017; and Yunoka Furugawa on 13 October 2017. In August 2018 she beat Yairineth Altuve by majority decision. A rematch against Altuve in December 2018 saw Yúdica win by unanimous decision.

In a fight against challenger Isabel Millan on 16 August 2019, a clash of heads between the boxers in the fourth-round caused Yúdica to suffer from significant bleeding. The fight was declared a no contest due to this, and Yúdica retained the title. A rematch took place on 26 November 2021, with Yúdica winning by unanimous decision.

Yudica lost her title in her 10th defense on 29 October 2022, going down to Mexico's Arely Muciño by split decision at Pechanga Arena, San Diego, California, US. Judge David Soliven scored the fight 96-94 for Yudica while judges Alejandro Rochin (96–94) and Zachary Young (97–93) were in favour of Muciño.

On 28 July 2023, Yudica attempted to become a two-weight world champion when she challenged WBC and WBA female minimumweight title holder Seniesa Estrada at Palms Casino Resort, Las Vegas, Nevada, US, losing by unanimous decision. All three ringside judges scored the fight 97–93 in favour of Estrada.

== Professional boxing record ==
27 fights	20 wins	2 losses
By knockout	1	0
By decision	19	2
Draws	4	
No contests	1	

No.	Result	Record	Opponent	Type	Round, time	Date	Location	Notes
27	Draw	20–2–4 (1)	(Argentina) Mia Soledad Nievas	UD	6	4 Jul 2026	Club Social y Cultural El Cruce, Malvinas Argentinas, Buenos Aires, Argentina	
26	Win	20–2–3 (1)	(Argentina) Carolina Ornella Ferrari	UD	8	25 Nov 2023	Polideportivo Los Polvorines, Los Polvorines, Argentina	
25	Loss	19–2–3 (1)	(United States) Seniesa Estrada	UD	10	28 Jul 2023	(United States) Palms Casino Resort, Las Vegas, Nevada, US	For the WBC and WBA female minimumweight World titles
24	Win	19–1–3 (1)	(Argentina) Tamara Elisabet Demarco	SD	10	29 Apr 2023	Polideportivo Los Polvorines, Los Polvorines, Argentina	Won the vacant WBC female light-flyweight Silver title
23	Loss	18–1–3 (1)	(Mexico) Arely Muciño	SD	10	29 Oct 2022	(United States) Pechanga Arena, San Diego, California, US	Lost the IBF female flyweight title
22	Win	18–0–3 (1)	(Argentina) Lucia De Los Angeles Ruiz	TKO	3 (8)	17 Sep 2022	Polideportivo Diego Armando Maradona, Pablo Nogues, Argentina	
21	Win	17–0–3 (1)	(Mexico) Isabel Millan	UD	10	26 Nov 2021	Estadio Marcelo Garcia, Pocitos, Argentina	Retained IBF female flyweight title
20	NC	16–0–3 (1)	(Mexico) Isabel Millan	NC	4 (10)	16 Aug 2019	Estadio Aldo Cantoni, San Juan, Argentina	Retained IBF female flyweight title; Fight stopped after Yúdica cut from accidental head clash
19	Win	16–0–3	(Venezuela) Yairineth Altuve	UD	10	21 Dec 2018	Estadio Aldo Cantoni, San Juan, Argentina	Retained IBF female flyweight title
18	Win	15–0–3	(Venezuela) Yairineth Altuve	MD	10	4 Aug 2018	Estadio Aldo Cantoni, San Juan, Argentina	Retained IBF female flyweight title
17	Win	14–0–3	(Argentina) Virginia Noemi Carcamo	UD	8	8 Jun 2018	Concepción Patín Club, San Juan, Argentina	
16	Win	13–0–3	(Japan) Yunoka Furukawa	UD	10	13 Oct 2017	Estadio Aldo Cantoni, San Juan, Argentina	Retained IBF female flyweight title
15	Win	12–0–3	(Venezuela) Carolina Alvarez	UD	10	24 Mar 2017	Estadio Aldo Cantoni, San Juan, Argentina	Retained IBF female flyweight title
14	Win	11–0–3	(Argentina) Soledad del Valle Frias	UD	10	22 Apr 2016	Estadio Aldo Cantoni, San Juan, Argentina	Retained IBF female flyweight title
13	Win	10–0–3	(United States) Tyrieshia Douglas	UD	10	31 Jul 2015	Estadio Aldo Cantoni, San Juan, Argentina	Retained IBF female flyweight title
12	Draw	9–0–3	(Argentina) Vanesa Lorena Taborda	MD	10	20 Mar 2015	Club 2 de Mayo, Caseros, Argentina	Retained IBF female flyweight title
11	Win	9–0–2	(Uruguay) Gabriela Bouvier	SD	10	19 Dec 2014	Club 1 de Mayo, Remedios de Escalada, Argentina	Won IBF female flyweight title
10	Win	8–0–2	(Argentina) Florencia Roxana Canteros	SD	10	17 Oct 2014	Estadio F.A.B., Buenos Aires, Argentina	Won FAB female flyweight title
9	Draw	7–0–2	(Chile) Daniela Asenjo	PTS	6	12 Sep 2014	Gimnasio Gil de Castro, Valdivia, Chile	
8	Win	7–0–1	(Argentina) Vanesa Lorena Taborda	UD	4	15 Mar 2014	Club Sportivo La Floresta, San Miguel de Tucumán, Argentina	
7	Win	6–0–1	(Argentina) Alejandra Rios	UD	4	21 Sep 2013	Club Sportivo America, Rosario, Argentina	
6	Draw	5–0–1	(Argentina) Soledad del Valle Frias	PTS	4	25 May 2013	Estadio José María Gatica, Villa Mercedes, Argentina	
5	Win	5–0	(Argentina) Alejandra Soledad Morales	UD	4	26 Apr 2013	Estadio Aldo Cantoni, San Juan, Argentina	
4	Win	4–0	(Argentina) Rocio Cejas	PTS	4	23 Nov 2012	Club Ferro Carril Oeste, General Pico, Argentina	
3	Win	3–0	(Argentina) Soledad del Valle Frias	UD	4	9 Nov 2012	Club Julio Mocoroa, San Juan, Argentina	
2	Win	2–0	(Argentina) Alejandra Rios	MD	4	13 Oct 2012	Estadio Aldo Cantoni, San Juan, Argentina	
1	Win	1–0	(Argentina) Soledad del Valle Frias	UD	4	21 Apr 2012	Estadio Aldo Cantoni, San Juan, Argentina	
