= Isabel Rivero =

Spanish boxer (born 1987)

Personal information
- Nationality: Spanish
- Born: 14 September 1987 (age 39)
- Weight: Atomweight; Mini flyweight; Light flyweight

Boxing career
- Stance: Orthodox

Boxing record
- Total fights: 18
- Wins: 14
- Win by KO: 1
- Losses: 3
- Draws: 1

Isabel Rivero (born 14:September 1987) is a Spanish professional boxer. She has held the WBA female atomweight title since November 2025 and the IBF female atomweight title since November 2026.

== Professional career ==
Rivero turned professional in 2022 and compiled a record of 10–2–1 before challenging WBO female mini-flyweight champion Sarah Bormann at Glaspalast Sindelfingen in Sindelfingen, Germany, on 26 April 2025, losing via split decision. She would get another opportunity at a world title when she faced Silvia Torres for the vacant WBA female atomweight title at Cúpula del Milenio in Valladolid, Spain, on 21 November 2025, winning via majority decision.

On 21 November 2026, Rivero faced IBF female atomweight champion Sumire Yamanaka in a title unification bout at Plaza de Toros in Illescas, Castilla–La Mancha, Spain. She won via unanimous decision.

== Professional boxing record ==
18 fights	14 wins	3 losses
By knockout	1	0
By decision	13	3
Draws	1	

No.	Result	Record	Opponent	Type	Round, time	Date	Location	Notes
18	Win	14–3–1	Sumire Yamanaka	UD	10	2026-11-21	Plaza de Toros, Illescas, Castilla–La Mancha, Spain	Retained WBA female atomweight title; won IBF female atomweight title
17	Win	13–3–1	Watcharaporn Namphon	UD	10	2026-05-17	Cúpula del Milenio, Valladolid, Spain	Retained WBA female atomweight title
16	Win	12–3–1	Silvia Torres	MD	10	2025-11-21	Cúpula del Milenio, Valladolid, Spain	Won vacant WBA female atomweight title
15	Win	11–3–1	Johana Zuniga	UD	10	2025-06-06	Cúpula del Milenio, Valladolid, Spain	Retained WBA Ibero-American female atomweight title
14	Loss	10–3–1	Sarah Bormann	SD	10	2025-04-26	Glaspalast Sindelfingen, Sindelfingen, Germany	For WBO female mini-flyweight title
13	Win	10–2–1	Estefania Matute	UD	8	2025-02-27	Palacio Municipal de Deportes San Pablo, Seville, Spain	
12	Win	9–2–1	Erika Bolivar	UD	10	2024-11-24	Cúpula del Milenio, Valladolid, Spain	Won vacant WBA Ibero-American female atomweight title
11	Win	8–2–1	Roxana Maria Colmenarez	MD	10	2024-06-09	Cúpula del Milenio, Valladolid, Spain	
10	Win	7–2–1	Minerva Gutierrez	SD	10	2024-03-03	Cúpula del Milenio, Valladolid, Spain	Retained European female mini-flyweight title
9	Win	6–2–1	Consuelo Portolani	UD	10	2023-12-15	Cúpula del Milenio, Valladolid, Spain	Won vacant European female mini-flyweight title
8	Win	5–2–1	Silviya Vasileva	TKO	3 (6)	2023-10-14	León Arena, León, Spain	
7	Win	4–2–1	Griselda Torollari	UD	10	2023-06-30	Polideportivo Huerta del Rey, Valladolid, Spain	
6	Draw	3–2–1	Souad Masmoudi	SD	10	2023-04-15	Hall des sports Pierre Gaspard, Épernay, France	For WBF International female light-flyweight title
5	Loss	3–2	Minerva Gutierrez	PTS	8	2023-03-04	Polideportivo Municipal, Pola de Laviana, Spain	
4	Win	3–1	Jovana Zdravkovic	UD	4	2022-12-16	Frontón Soto de la Medinilla, Valladolid, Spain	
3	Win	2–1	Cristina Navarro	PTS	6	2022-09-16	Polideportivo Principe de Asturias, Aranda de Duero, Spain	
2	Loss	1–1	Cristina Navarro	PTS	4	2022-07-23	Polideportivo Municipal Mateu Canellas, Inca, Spain	
1	Win	1–0	Gordana Marjanovic	PTS	4	2022-06-10	Cúpula del Milenio, Valladolid, Spain	

== See also ==
- List of female boxers

Sporting positions
Regional boxing titles
Vacant Title last held by Joana Pastrana	European mini-flyweight champion December 15, 2023 – 2025; Vacated	Vacant Title next held by Vittoria Parigi Bini
New title	WBA Ibero-American atomweight champion November 24, 2024 – November 21, 2025; Vacated	Vacant
World boxing titles
Vacant Title last held by Tina Rupprecht	WBA atomweight champion November 21, 2025 – present	Incumbent
Preceded by Sumire Yamanaka	IBF atomweight champion November 21, 2026 – present	Incumbent
