= Camila Zamorano =

Mexican boxer (born 2007)

Personal information
- Nickname: La Magnífica
- Born: Camila Anae Zamorano Encinas; 26 December 2007 (age 18) Hermosillo, Sonora, Mexico
- Weight: Atomweight

Boxing career
- Stance: Orthodox

Boxing record
- Total fights: 16
- Wins: 16
- Win by KO: 1

Camila Anae Zamorano Encinas (born 26 December 2007), known as La Magnífica, is a Mexican professional boxer. She has held the WBC female atomweight title since October 2025. At 17 years and 180 days old, she became the youngest person to win a WBC world title and the youngest female boxer to hold any of the four main sanctioning bodies' global championships.

== Early life and amateur career ==
Zamorano was born on 26 December 2007 in Hermosillo, Sonora. She began training in boxing at the age of 11 under the guidance of her father and coach, Eleazar Zamorano.

As an amateur, she compiled a record of 53 wins and four losses, winning multiple regional and state titles. Due to limited opportunities to compete against girls her age, she moved into the professional ranks while still a high school student.

== Professional career ==
Zamorano made her professional debut in 2023. On 12 October 2024, she won the WBC female atomweight International title by defeating Norj Guro at Arena Sonora in Hermosillo, becoming the first female boxer from Sonora to secure an international title.

She defended her title on 25 January 2025, defeating Yoselyn Pérez by unanimous decision in San Luis Potosí.

On 14 June 2025, aged 17 years and 180 days, Zamorano won the vacant WBC interim female atomweight title by defeating Mika Iwakawa on a unanimous decision in Hermosillo, making her the youngest person to hold such a championship in the organization's history.

On 15 October 2025, she was elevated to full WBC female atomweight champion following the retirement of Tina Rupprecht, who had been the title holder.

Zamorano made the first defense of her WBC female atomweight title against Sana Hazuki in Hermosillo on 25 October 2025. She won the bout by a unanimous decision.

She successfully defended her title a second time with a unanimous decision win over Claudia Veronica Ruiz at Arena Sonora in Hermosillo on 21 February 2026.

Having had emergency surgery to remove her appendix on 17 April 2026, Zamorano made her third defense against Perla Perez at Arena Potosi in San Luis Potosi on 22 August 2026, winning via unanimous decision.

On 12 November 2026, Zamorano retained her title for a fourth time, defeating Brenda Balderas by unanimous decision in the main event of a card staged at Arena GNP Seguros in Acapulco as part of the WBC's 64th annual convention.

== Professional boxing record ==
16 fights	16 wins	0 losses
By knockout	1	0
By decision	15	0

No.	Result	Record	Opponent	Type	Round, time	Date	Location	Notes
16	Win	16–0	Brenda Balderas Martinez	UD	10	12 Nov 2026	Arena GNP Seguros, Acapulco, Mexico	Retained WBC female atomweight title
15	Win	15–0	Perla Perez	UD	10	22 Aug 2026	Arena Potosi, San Luis Potosi, Mexico	Retained WBC female atomweight title
14	Win	14–0	Claudia Veronica Ruiz	UD	10	21 Feb 2026	Arena Sonora, Hermosillo, Sonora, Mexico	Retained WBC female atomweight title
13	Win	13–0	Sana Hazuki	UD	10	25 Oct 2025	Arena Sonora, Hermosillo, Sonora, Mexico	Retained WBC female atomweight title
12	Win	12–0	Mika Iwakawa	UD	10	14 Jun 2025	Arena Sonora, Hermosillo, Sonora, Mexico	Won vacant WBC interim female atomweight title
11	Win	11–0	Yoselyn Perez	UD	8	25 Jan 2025	San Luis Potosi, Mexico	
10	Win	10–0	Norj Guro	UD	10	12 Oct 2024	Arena Sonora, Hermosillo, Sonora, Mexico	Won vacant WBC female International atomweight title
9	Win	9–0	Melanie Fernanda	SD	6	27 Jul 2024	Tlaxcala, Mexico	
8	Win	8–0	Karla Sanchez Barrera	UD	6	20 Apr 2024	Arena Sonora, Hermosillo, Sonora, Mexico	
7	Win	7–0	Karla Lechuga Alvarado	SD	6	9 Mar 2024	Morelos, Mexico	
6	Win	6–0	Sabrina Persona	UD	6	16 Dec 2023	Tijuana Zonkeys, Tijuana, Mexico	
5	Win	5–0	Sandra Paola Chairez	UD	6	6 Oct 2023	Arena Sonora, Hermosillo, Sonora, Mexico	
4	Win	4–0	Danna Frayre Gutierrez	MD	4	9 Sep 2023	Arena Sonora, Hermosillo, Sonora, Mexico	
3	Win	3–0	Keren Mendez Ochoa	UD	4	29 Jul 2023	Jardines del Pedregal, Hermosillo, Sonora, Mexico	
2	Win	2–0	Sandra Paola Chairez	UD	4	17 Jun 2023	Arena Sonora, Hermosillo, Sonora, Mexico	
1	Win	1–0	Isabel Arellanes	TKO	3 (4), 1:16	22 Apr 2023	Arena Sonora, Hermosillo, Sonora, Mexico	

== Education ==
Zamorano graduated from the College of Scientific and Technological Studies of the State of Sonora (Cecytes), Hermosillo V Pueblitos campus.

== Awards and recognition ==
- Municipal Sports Award of Hermosillo (2024), junior female category.
