= Andrew Zamorano =

Uruguayan footballer (born 1995)

Personal information
- Full name: Andrew Gaspar Zamorano Melgar
- Date of birth: February 4, 1995 (age 31)
- Place of birth: Montevideo, Uruguay
- Height: 1.75 m (5 ft 9 in)
- Position: Left-back

Team information
- Current team: Villa Española

Youth career
- River Plate

Senior career*
Years	Team	Apps	(Gls)
2014–2015	River Plate	0	(0)
2014	→ Cerrito (loan)	14	(0)
2015–2016	Cerro	0	(0)
2016–2018	Cerrito	39	(0)
2019–2020	Villa Española	28	(0)
2021	Atenas	5	(0)
2022	Cerrito	18	(0)
2023	Progreso	13	(0)
2024	Unión San Felipe	11	(0)
2025–	Villa Española	6	(0)
- * Club domestic league appearances and goals as of 21 July 2025

Andrew Gaspar Zamorano Melgar (born February 4, 1995) is an Uruguayan-Chilean footballer who plays as a left-back for Villa Española.

== Career ==
In 2021, Zamorano played for Atenas de San Carlos.

In 2024, he moved to Chile and signed with Unión San Felipe.

In 2025, Zamorano returned to his country of birth with Villa Española.

== Career statistics ==
As of 28 November 2020.

Club	Season	League			Cup		Continental		Other		Total	
Club	Season	Division	Apps	Goals	Apps	Goals	Apps	Goals	Apps	Goals	Apps	Goals
Cerrito	2014–15	Segunda División	14	0	0	0	—		0	0	14	0
Cerrito	2016–T	Segunda División	5	0	0	0	—		0	0	5	0
Cerrito	2017	Segunda División	30	0	0	0	—		0	0	30	0
Cerrito	2018	Segunda División	4	0	0	0	—		0	0	4	0
Cerrito	Total		53	0	0	0	—		0	0	53	0
Cerro	2015–16	Primera División	0	0	0	0	—		0	0	0	0
Villa Española	2019	Segunda División	9	0	0	0	—		0	0	9	0
Villa Española	2020	Segunda División	19	0	0	0	—		0	0	19	0
Villa Española	Total		28	0	0	0	—		0	0	28	0
Atenas	2021	Segunda División	0	0	0	0	—		0	0	0	0
Total career			81	0	0	0	0	0	0	0	81	0

== Personal life ==
He holds Chilean nationality by descent since his father, who was with the Palestino youth ranks, is Chilean.
