= Sana Hazuki =

Japanese boxer (born 1984)

Personal information
- Born: 葉月さな; 23 August 1984 (age 41) Chikushino, Fukuoka, Japan
- Height: 5 ft 2 in (157 cm)
- Weight: Atomweight, Minimumweight

Boxing career
- Stance: Orthodox

Boxing record
- Total fights: 26
- Wins: 13
- Win by KO: 6
- Losses: 12
- Draws: 1

Sana Hazuki (葉月さな, Hazuki Sana) (born 23 August 1984) is a Japanese professional boxer who has challenged for world titles on three occasions. She has held the WBC female Silver atomweight title and is a former Oriental and Pacific Boxing Federation female minimumweight champion.

== Career ==
Having begun her professional boxing career in 2014, Hazuki won her first title when she defeated Oriental and Pacific Boxing Federation female minimumweight champion, Eruka Hiromoto, by split decision at City Sogo Gym in Iwakuni, Japan, on 17 November 2019.

In her next fight, she challenged IBF female minimumweight champion, Yokasta Valle, at Oxigeno Human Playground in Heredia, Costa Rica, on 30 January 2021, but lost on a unanimous decision.

An immediate rematch was held at Camara Ganadera de San Carlos in Alajuela, Costa Rica, on 25 March 2022, with the same result.

On 28 September 2023, Hazuki won the vacant WBC female Silver atomweight title when her opponent, Denise Castle, retired at the end of round five at Spaceplus Bangkok RCA in Thailand.

She lost the title in her first defense against Esneidy Rodriguez Olmos at Auditorio Benito Juárez in Veracruz, Mexico, on 7 September 2024, slipping to a unanimous decision defeat.

Aged 41, Hazuki challenged 17-year-old WBC female atomweight champion, Camila Zamorano, at Arena Sonora in Hermosillo, Mexico, on 25 October 2025, but lost by unanimous decision.
