= Theodore H. Hittell =

American politician and historian (1830–1917)

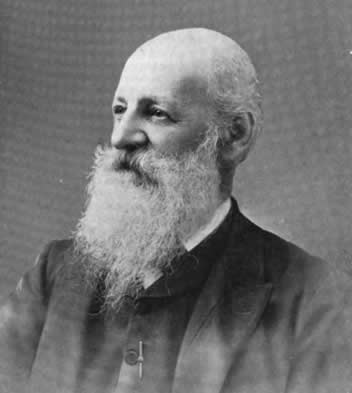
- Theodore H. Hittell
- Born: April 5, 1830 Jonestown, Lebanon County, Pennsylvania, USA
- Died: February 23, 1917 (aged 86) San Francisco, California, USA
- Occupation: Author, historian
- Relatives: John Shertzer Hittell (brother); Carlos Hittell (son)

Theodore Henry Hittell (1830–1917) was a historian, state senator, and writer. He is known for his histories of California as well as his association with John "Grizzly" Adams.

== Life and career ==
=== Association with John "Grizzly" Adams ===
During Grizzly Adams' exhibition of his grizzly bears and other trained animals in San Francisco, he was working with Hittell from July 1857 until December 1859. Hittell listened to Adams narrate his adventures almost daily for an hour or so and took careful notes, cross-questioning Adams to assure he had it straight. Adams knew, and was apparently flattered by the fact Mr. Hittell intended to write a book based upon Adams' talks. Also, during this time, the artist Charles C. Nahl took an interest in Adams' grizzlies and, working with Hittell, prepared illustrations (one of which is at the head of this article) that would be used in Hittell's forthcoming book. One of his paintings eventually became the model for the grizzly bear on California's state flag. In 1860, after Adams had relocated to New York, Theodore H. Hittell published his book, The Adventures of James Capen Adams, Mountaineer and Grizzly Bear Hunter of California, in San Francisco, and then later that year, in Boston.

=== Association with John Muir ===
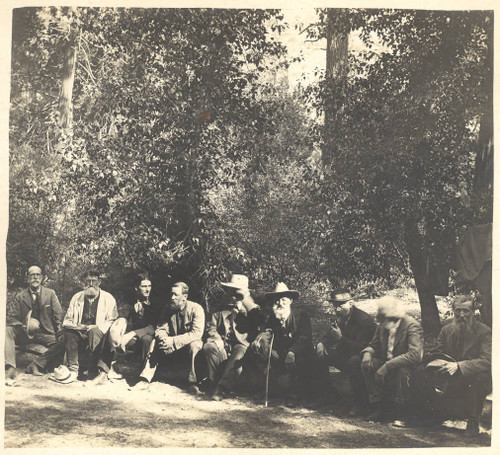
Theodore Hittell fourth from right and John Muir far right.

Hittell had a close relationship and correspondence with John Muir.

=== Comparison to Hubert H. Bancroft ===
In an article in the California Historical Quarterly, "Theodore H. Hittell and Hubert H. Bancroft: Two Western Historians", Robert W. Righter compares the two historians. The two were somewhat antagonistic toward each other. Hittel thought that H. H. Bancroft gave too much of the writing of The Works over to assistants. For instance, H. H. Bancroft's assistant, Henry L. Oaks, wrote five of the seven volumes of H. H. Bancroft's "History of California". H. H. Bancroft disparaged the lack of extensive scholarship in Hittell's "History of California". Modern historians view T. H. Hittell as being more literary, while H. H. Bancroft is more scholarly.

=== Time as a California State Senator ===
When the Constitution of California was adopted in 1879, Mr. Hittell became greatly interested in State politics. He was elected as State Senator from San Francisco and served during 1880–82.

== Bibliography ==
- Theodore Henry Hittell (1861). The Adventures of James Capen Adams: Mountaineer and Grizzly Bear Hunter, of California. Crosby, Nichols, Lee.
- Theodore Henry Hittell (1898). History of California. Vol. 1. N.J. Stone. ISBN 9781404750487.
- Theodore Henry Hittell (1885). History of California. Vol. 2. N.J. Stone.
- Theodore Henry Hittell (1898). History of California. Vol. 3. N. J. Stone.
- Theodore Henry Hittell (1898). History of California. Vol. 4. N. J. Stone.
- Theodore Henry Hittell (1893). George Bancroft and His Services to California: Memorial Address, Delivered May 12, 1891, Before the California Historical Society. California Historical Society.
- Mrs. T. H. Hittell (1893). "California Pictographs and Hieroglyphics". Science. 21 (528): 146–47. doi:10.1126/science.ns-21.528.146. JSTOR 1765599. PMID 17833335.
- Royce, Josiah (1898). "Review of History of California". The American Historical Review. 4 (1): 184–86. doi:10.2307/1832352. JSTOR 1832352.
- Gatschet, A. S. (1886). "Theodore H. Hittell's History of California". The American Naturalist. 20 (10): 871–73. doi:10.1086/274346. JSTOR 2450751.
