= Zamorano Club =

Bibliographic and manuscript collecting society in Los Angeles, California

The Zamorano Club is a bibliographic and manuscript collecting society in Los Angeles, California. It is the oldest organization of its type in Southern California. It was founded on January 25, 1928. It was named after Agustín V. Zamorano who brought the first printing press to California. The club hosts lectures and publishes books. It is affiliated with the Fellowship of American Bibliophilic Societies (FABS).

Lawyer William W. Clary, publisher W. Irving Way, and illustrator Garner A. Beckett were members. Women were not allowed to be members of the Club until 1990.

The archives of the Zamarano Club are held in the collections of the University of Southern California's Special Collections, Newberry Library, the Claremont Colleges, Occidental College, and the University of California at Los Angeles' Clark Memorial Library.

== See also ==
- Zamorano Eighty
