= John "Grizzly" Adams =

American mountain man

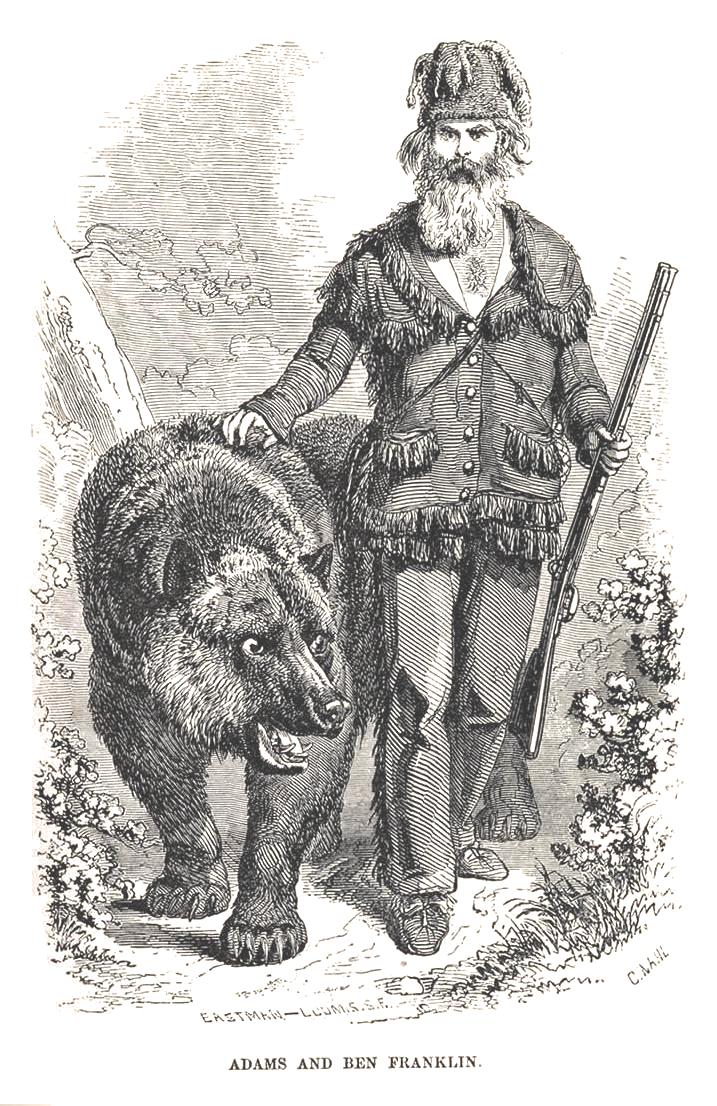
- "Grizzly" Adams, with his grizzly bear, Benjamin Franklin, from the 1860 Hutchings' Illustrated California Magazine
- Born: John Adams; October 22, 1812; Medway, Massachusetts, US
- Died: October 25, 1860 (aged 48); Neponset, Boston, formerly Suffolk County, Massachusetts, US
- Other name: James Capen Adams
- Occupations: cobbler; zoological collector; merchant; miner; rancher; farmer; frontiersman; fur trader; hunter; trapper; animal trainer; circus performer
- Years active: 1826−1860
- Known for: his love of grizzly bears and performing with the trained bears in the circus

John Adams (also known as James Capen Adams and Grizzly Adams) (October 22, 1812 – October 25, 1860) (Note: When Theodore H. Hittell met Adams in 1856 at Adams' Mountaineer Museum in San Francisco, California, Adams first represented himself as William Adams, then a short time later told Hittell (also incorrectly) his name was James Capen Adams, an alias he maintained until 1860. He also told Hittell he was born on October 20, 1807, in Maine. The 1970s movie and TV series used the same "James Capen Adams" name incorrectly conveyed by Hittell. The real John Adams did not have a middle name. His mother's maiden surname was "Capen". He did, however, actually have a younger brother named James Capen Adams. Information on his Massachusetts death record (Vol. 139, p. 225) also indicates that his name was John and gives an estimated birth year of 1813, based on age at death (48 years). His tombstone lists his first name as John and his date of death as October 25, 1860, age 48 years.) was a California mountain man and trainer of grizzly bears and other wild animals he captured for menageries, zoological gardens and circuses.

== Early years ==
Grizzly Adams was born John Boyden Adams to Eleazar Adams and Sybil Capen on October 22, 1812. His parents were of English ancestry. Born and raised in Medway, Massachusetts, a suburb of Boston, he received little to no education. Adams began as an apprentice in the footwear manufacturing industry at age fourteen. At age twenty-one, he left that occupation, seeking to satisfy his true love – the outdoors and nature. He signed on with a company of showmen as a zoological collector. John hunted and captured live wild animals in the wildest parts of Maine, Vermont, and New Hampshire, where he honed his woodsman, survival, and marksmanship skills. However, Adams told writer and historian Theodore H. Hittell, his early hunting and trapping career ended abruptly when he received severe back and spine injuries from a Bengal tiger he was attempting to train for his employers. Not wanting to become a burden on his family, after a year of recuperating he returned to his cobbler's bench in Boston, Massachusetts. In 1836, John married Cylena Drury and they had three children: Arabella, Arathusa, and Seymour.

== California and Western States, 1849–1860 ==
In 1849 with the California Gold Rush in progress, John invested his life savings of over $6,000 (~$183,384 in 2025) to buy a large supply of footwear, and had it shipped to St. Louis, Missouri. He intended to sell his goods at great profit to the thousands of forty-niners passing through St. Louis. Through no fault of his own, he lost the entire investment in the St. Louis wharf fire. Shortly thereafter, John's father committed suicide; – it is possible that he had invested heavily in John's plans. At this point, John felt he had nothing to lose. He had a touch of gold fever and a yearning for adventure. He knew even if he failed to recoup his lost investment in the mines, he could at least support himself by hunting and trapping in the untapped wilds of California. He left his family and relatives behind in Massachusetts and joined the 49ers on their way to California. On his journey via the Santa Fe and Gila trails, he twice survived near fatal illnesses and arrived at the gold fields of California late in 1849.

Adams tried his luck at mining, hunting game to sell to the miners, trading, and finally, ranching and farming. At times he was rich and then, just as quickly, broke. Late in 1852, having lost his ranch outside of Stockton, California, to creditors, he took the few items he could salvage and headed into the Sierra Nevada mountains to get away from it all. With the help of the local Miwok Indians, Adams built a cabin and stable and spent the winter alone in the Sierra. John was an expert hunter and his New England training in shoemaking and leather craft gave him the necessary skills to fashion buckskin clothing and moccasins (the clothing he adopted as normal attire for the remainder of his life). He also made his own harness, pack saddles, snowshoes and other items he needed.

Adams traveled great distances from his California base camp on foot, on horse or mule, or in an ox-drawn wagon. In 1853, he made a hunting and trapping expedition some 1,200 miles (1,900 km) from his base camp in California to eastern Washington Territory (what is now western Montana). While there, he caught a yearling female grizzly that he named Lady Washington. Even though she was already a year old and very wild, he managed to tame her and taught her to follow him without restraint. Later, he trained her to carry a pack and then to pull a loaded sled. She even cuddled up near John to keep him warm in freezing conditions. Eventually, Lady Washington allowed John to ride on her back.

In 1854, Adams retrieved a pair of two-week-old male grizzly cubs from the den of their mother near Yosemite Valley. He named one of them Benjamin Franklin. Ben saved John's life a year later in 1855, when a mother grizzly attacked Adams. John and Ben both bore the scars of that attack the rest of their lives. The head injury John received in the attack led to his demise five years later. In the summer of 1854, John traveled to the Rocky Mountains to hunt and collect more live animals. He and his hunting companions sold meat, hides and some live animals to the emigrants along the Emigrant Trails near where the Oregon Trail and the Mormon Trail split away from each other (southwestern Wyoming). They also sold and traded at Fort Bridger, Wyoming and Fort Supply. During this expedition, Lady Washington mated with a Rocky Mountain grizzly, resulting in a male cub that was born the next year when she was with Adams in Corral Hollow on the eastern side of the California coastal mountains. Adams christened her cub General Fremont, in honor of John C. Frémont.

In the winter of 1854, Grizzly Adams captured a huge California grizzly in the largest cage trap Adams had ever constructed. John named him Samson. When the bear was later weighed on a hay scale, it tipped the beam at 1,500 pounds (one of the largest grizzly bears ever captured alive).

During 1855, Adams and his companions hunted and trapped game in the California Coast Range mountains, journeyed to the Kern River mines, then proceeded southward to the Tehachapi Mountains and Tejon Pass. Returning from the Tejon Pass area, Adams followed the Old Spanish Route via San Miguel and San Jose. Due to interest of the curious people the group met, John set up impromptu shows of his bears and other animals he had collected on his summer excursion. These shows, a precursor to his circus career, were conducted in San Miguel, Santa Clara, San Jose, the redwoods and finally San Francisco.

In 1856, John retrieved all of his animals from Howard's Ranch near Stockton, California, where he had left them to be cared for while he was absent. He then opened the Mountaineer Museum in a basement on Clay Street in San Francisco. Due to notices T. H. Hittell printed in the San Francisco daily Evening Bulletin, Adams' show drew many more patrons. Soon thereafter, Adams was able to move his menagerie and museum, now called the Pacific Museum, to a better location. The new building could accommodate larger audiences and house more animals and displays. By 1858, he was referred to as the "Barnum of the Pacific", in a San Francisco newspaper. In January 1858, tragedy struck when noble Ben, John's favorite grizzly, died of an illness for which no remedy could be found. Adams was devastated at the loss, but continued to show his animals daily. He also continually added more animals and other attractions to his museum. In 1859, due to such overextensions, he lost his museum building to creditors. However, he was able to save most of his menagerie, which he relocated temporarily to another building.

Grizzly Adams' health was deteriorating and he knew his life would soon end. Since he had been away from his wife in Massachusetts for over ten years, he wanted to earn enough before he died to leave her a comfortable sum. He made arrangements to relocate his menagerie and collections to New York, in hopes of joining P. T. Barnum as a part of his show. On January 7, 1860, Adams and his menagerie departed from San Francisco on the clipper ship Golden Fleece on their way to New York City via Cape Horn, a 3 1/2-month voyage.

In New York City, Grizzly Adams, still representing himself as James Capen Adams, joined with Barnum to perform his California Menagerie in a canvas tent for six weeks. His health continued to decline and after a doctor told him he had better settle his affairs, Adams decided he would sell his menagerie to Barnum. However, disregarding his doctor's prognosis, he managed to persuade Barnum to agree to let him perform his animals for another ten weeks for a $500 bonus. Adams' willpower held out for the full contract, though at the end he could hardly walk onto the stage. From the proceeds of the sale of the menagerie and the bonus, he had accomplished his goal of providing a comfortable sum for his wife.

== Death ==
Adams suffered head and neck trauma during a grizzly attack in the Sierra Nevada mountains of California in 1855. His scalp was dislodged, and he was left with a silver dollar-sized impression in his skull, just above his forehead. Adams had made pets of several grizzlies, and often wrestled with them while training them and in exhibitions. During one such bout, his most delinquent grizzly, General Fremont (named for John C. Fremont), struck Adams in the head and reopened the wound. It was subsequently reinjured several times, eventually leaving Adams' brain tissue exposed.

The damage was further exacerbated while Adams was on tour with a circus in New England during the summer of 1860, when a monkey he was attempting to train purportedly bit into the wound. After more than four months performing with his California Menagerie, complications from the injury led to Adams' inability to continue with the show. After completing his contract with P. T. Barnum, he retired to Neponset, Massachusetts, where he died of illness (possibly meningitis) just five days after arriving at the home of his wife and daughter (October 25). Upon hearing of Adams' death, Barnum was deeply grieved.

Adams was interred at the Bay Path Cemetery in Charlton, Massachusetts. It is believed P. T. Barnum commissioned the creation of his tombstone. Also buried there nearby are his mother, father, a sister, his wife, his son and one of his two daughters.

== Association with Theodore H. Hittell and Charles C. Nahl ==
During Grizzly Adams' exhibition of his grizzly bears and other trained animals in San Francisco, he was working with Hittell from July 1857 until December 1859. Hittell listened to Adams narrate his adventures almost daily for an hour or so and took careful notes, cross-questioning Adams to assure he had it straight. Adams knew, and was apparently flattered by the fact Mr. Hittell intended to write a book based upon Adams' talks. Also, during this time, the artist Charles C. Nahl took an interest in Adams' grizzlies and, working with Hittell, prepared illustrations (one of which is at the head of this article) that would be used in Hittell's forthcoming book. One of his paintings eventually became the model for the grizzly bear on California's State Flag. In 1860, after Adams had relocated to New York, Theodore H. Hittell published his book, The Adventures of James Capen Adams, Mountaineer and Grizzly Bear Hunter of California, in San Francisco, and then later that year, in Boston.

== Association with circus people ==
In 1833, Adams joined a group of showmen as a wild animal collector. Several menageries were active in the New England area at this time; probably the largest was June, Titus, & Co.'s National Menagerie, also known as the Grand National Menagerie. Boston, Massachusetts was the venue for many such menageries while Adams was living there, so he had the opportunity to meet and interact with the proprietors and performers. There were also circuses and menageries on the Pacific Coast when he reached California, one of which was the Joseph A. Rowe Olympic Circus, which performed in San Francisco and Sacramento, California, at the time he arrived.

On two occasions, Adams told Hittell he had contact with an acquaintance from New England. This person most likely was in some way connected to the circus/menagerie business. Adams told Hittell that the man was his brother, "William", although Adams didn't have a brother by that name. According to Earle Williams, the property that Adams ranched near Stockton, California, in 1852 was the same land that was later acquired by Henry C. Lee and John R. Marshall, proprietors of the Lee and Marshall Circus. Lee hired a man by the name of David Howard to run the ranch, which was about eight miles (13 km) southeast of Stockton, on Mariposa Road. Adams often left his stock and captured animals at "Howard's Ranch" to be cared for by Howard and Lee's circus people. Lee's circus used the ranch to keep their circus stock, wagons and other items in the circus' winter off-season. According to Williams, when Grizzly Adams established his Mountaineer Museum in San Francisco in 1856, the menagerie was a part of Lee's Circus, as a side show. Adams and a couple of his bears appeared with Rowe's Pioneer Circus in November.

In 1859, T. W. Tanner was a partner with Adams (this may have been the man who owned a half-interest in Adams' Pacific Museum, prior to Adams leaving for New York in January 1860). When Adams arrived in New York City in April 1860, he discovered while talking with P.T. Barnum, that Barnum had bought the one-half interest of Adams' California Menagerie (possibly from Tanner). On April 30, 1860, Adams and Barnum opened the California Menagerie in a canvas tent on the corner of Broadway and 4th Street in New York City The show ran for six weeks. Adams health was failing, and he sold the remaining interest in the menagerie to Barnum. Adams then went on a summer tour of Massachusetts, Connecticut, and New Hampshire as part of Nixon & Company's Circus. He continued to perform with his bears and other trained animals until late October 1860.

== Ties to the Adams family of New England ==
John Adams was a member of the Adams family of New England that included many important men and women who contributed to the founding and early history of the United States. His great-great-great-great-grandfather, Henry Adams (1583–1646), emigrated with his family from England to Boston, Massachusetts, in 1632, and thus established the famous Adams family in America. Henry's descendants include the patriot Samuel Adams and two presidents, John Adams and President Adams' son, John Quincy Adams. Grizzly was born in a suburb of Boston, Massachusetts, and was surrounded by relatives and cousins. During Grizzly Adams' childhood, President John Adams lived within a short buggy ride of him in Quincy, Massachusetts. The subject of this article, John Adams, was the third child and first son born to Eleazer Adams (1776–1849) and Sybil (Capen) Adams (1785–1844). He had seven siblings, Susan B., Almy, Charles, James Capen, Zilpha, Francis and Albert. John married Cylena Drury in 1836. They had three children: Arabella, Arathusa Elizabeth, and Seymour. His son, Seymour, never married, so there were no male descendants of Grizzly Adams bearing the Adams surname. John's younger brother, James Capen Adams, (the alias used by "Grizzly" Adams), married and fathered seven children. Curiously, when Grizzly Adams toured in Connecticut with the circus during the summer of 1860, his brother (the real) James Capen Adams and his family were living in Norfolk, Connecticut, at the time.

== Legacy ==
In his few years of hunting, John "Grizzly" Adams accomplished astonishing feats. Richard Dillon considers him to be "the greatest California mountain man of them all", and McCracken labels him the "Fabulous Mr. 'Grizzly' Adams." Modern hunters with high-powered precision weapons rarely get up close and personal with their game the way Adams did. He never hesitated to resort to hand-to-paw or knife-to-claw combat when necessary, and he captured more grizzlies alive in those few years than any other man has. In addition, he captured a wide variety of other wild animals, totaling in the hundreds, for menageries and zoos. Although Grizzly Adams did kill a number of bears, including grizzlies, he did so for food or their furs and hides. He was not a conservationist as the term is used in modern times. He did, however, genuinely love the outdoors, wildlife and unspoiled nature; he hated waste. The Western Hall of Fame celebrated Adams' achievements in 1911 with the "Heroes of California" honor.

=== Zoological Gardens ===
His Mountaineer Menagerie was the largest collection of live and mounted animal specimens on the West Coast. This collection became the Pacific Museum in San Francisco, where he and his animals entertained and educated people from far and wide. He was referred to as "the Barnum of the Pacific" in an article published in a San Francisco newspaper. His exhibitions also inspired others to campaign for the establishment of zoos, partially resultant of which were the establishment of Woodward's Gardens and, later, the famous Fleishhacker Zoo in San Francisco. On the East Coast, the Zoological Gardens in New York's Central Park was established in 1860 and in 1899 the Bronx Zoo was opened.

=== Flag of California ===
Charles C. Nahl, using Adams' grizzlies as models, made drawings, etchings and paintings of grizzly bears in various scenes. His sketches (including the one at the top of this article) were used to illustrate Hittel's book about Adams. Nahl's 1855 painting of a California grizzly portrayed Adams' bear Samson, which the mountain man had brought to San Jose and San Francisco to display that year; this image ended up being the source for the California Bear Flag, for which the official design specifications were put into law in 1953. The legislation also established the grizzly as California's state land animal.

=== Observations of grizzlies ===
Although not educated as a naturalist in a college or university, Adams learned the habits and facts of grizzly life first-hand through his observations while hunting and trapping them. Because of this, he came to know more about the California grizzly bear than anyone else. The information that Adams narrated to Hittell was published in the book The Adventures of James Capen Adams. His lore has been indispensable to naturalists including Tracy I. Storer and William H. Wright, as well as to historians.

== Media presentations ==
Adams was a famed United States outdoorsman, animal collector/trainer and an owner/performer in his own menagerie and later a partner of P. T. Barnum's shows. A biography was published about Adams the year he died. He was the central character in Charles E. Sellier's 1972 novel The Life and Times of Grizzly Adams. As a character in film and television, Adams has been played by:

- John Huston in The Life and Times of Judge Roy Bean (1972)
- Dan Haggerty in The Life and Times of Grizzly Adams (1974, 1977–1978, 1982)
- Gene Edwards in The Legend of Grizzly Adams (1990)
- Tom Tayback in Grizzly Adams and the Legend of Dark Mountain (1999)
- Jeff Watson in P.T. Barnum (1999)
