= Atomweight =

Weight class in combat sports

Atomweight (also referred to as light minimumweight, junior strawweight, junior mini-flyweight and pinweight) is a weight class in combat sports.

== Boxing ==
In women's boxing and junior amateur boxing pinweight is, or has been, a weight class for boxers weighing in under 102 pounds (46 kg) (before 2003, 45 kg).

In September 2010 the women's class in amateur boxing was partly merged into an extended 45–48 kg light flyweight division, with women weighing less than 45 kg excluded from competition. Pinweight is still defined for junior contests.

=== Women's professional champions ===
Current Champions (Last updated on May 19, 2026)

Sanctioning Body	Reign Began	Champion	Record	Defenses
WBA	November 21, 2025	Isabel Rivero	13–3–1 (1 KO)	1
WBC	October 25, 2025	Camila Zamorano	14–0 (1 KO)	1
IBF	April 7, 2026	Sumire Yamanaka	10–1 (3 KO)	0
WBO	December 26, 2025	Gabriela Timar	16–2 (1 KO)	0

==== Current The Ring world rankings ====
As of May 19, 2026.

Keys:

C Current The Ring world champion

Rank	Name	Record	Title(s)
C	vacant		
1	Sumire Yamanaka	10–1 (3 KO)	IBF
2	Camila Zamorano	14–0 (1 KO)	WBC
3	Esneidy Rodriguez Olmos	13–0–1 (1 KO)	
4	Shiori Yotsumoto	3–0 (2 KO)	
5	Aldana López	15–0 (0 KO)	

=== Women's Amateur Champions ===
year	World	European
2001	(Russia) Elena Sabitova	(France) Oria Mahmoud
2002	(India) Mary Kom	
2003		(Romania) Camelia Negrea
2004		(Russia) Elena Sabitova
2005	(India) Mary Kom	(Russia) Elena Sabitova
2006	(India) Mary Kom	(Romania) Steluta Duta
2007		(Romania) Steluta Duta
2008	(India) Mary Kom	
2009		(Russia) Svetlana Gnevanova

== Mixed Martial Arts ==
The atomweight division in mixed martial arts generally refers to competitors weighing less than 105 lb.

== See also ==
- Strawweight
- List of current female world boxing champions
