= Christina Hammer =

German boxer (born 1990)

Personal information
- Nicknames: Lady Hammer; Queen of the Middleweight
- Nationality: German
- Born: Christina Hammer; 16 August 1990 (age 36) Nowodolinka, Kazakh SSR, Soviet Union (now in Kazakhstan)
- Height: 5 ft 11 in (1.80 m)
- Weight: Light-middleweight; Middleweight; Super-middleweight

Boxing career
- Reach: 71 in (180cm)
- Stance: Orthodox

Boxing record
- Total fights: 30
- Wins: 28
- Win by KO: 13
- Losses: 1
- No contests: 1
Medal record
Woman's amateur boxing
Representing Germany
German Junior Championships
Gold medal – first place	2007 Berlin	Middleweight
German National Championships
Silver medal – second place	2008 Eichstätt	Light-middleweight

Christina Hammer (born 16 August 1990) is a German boxer. As a professional, she has held multiple world championships in two weight classes, including the WBO female middleweight title from 2010 to 2019, becoming the youngest boxer to win a WBO world title; the WBC female middleweight title between 2016 and 2018; and the WBO female super-middleweight title in 2013. She also challenged once for the WBO female light-middleweight title in 2014 and once for the undisputed female middleweight championship against Claressa Shields in 2019.

Since Hammer's victory against Zita Zatyko, she has earned Fighter of the Year by the WBF and WBO; she was awarded BDB's Female Boxer of the Year; and the WBO awarded her with the WBO Diamond Ring for exceptional performance. As of February 2019, Hammer is ranked as the world's second best active female middleweight by The Ring and BoxRec, and the seventh best active female, pound-for-pound, by ESPN.

Hammer is known for her patient and methodical boxing style, wearing her opponents down with jabs and increasingly aggressive follow-up rights. Since November 2021 she is signed by Wasserman Boxing and managed by Daniel Todorovic of O1NE Sport GmbH.

== Early life ==
Christina Hammer was born 16 August 1990 in Nowodolinka, Kazakh SSR, before emigrating with her parents to Sontra, Germany, in 1991. Her parents left Kazakhstan as they saw a better future for the whole family in Germany, with the quality of education and quality of life, while Hammer spoke of being raised to never give up. She developed a passion for sports through football, running, swimming, and at the age of 13, she was introduced to boxing after her uncles allowed her to accompany them to boxing gyms. She trained in Eschwege under Robert Staar, while going on to become a junior champion three years later. At the age of 18, Hammer was discovered by her coach and trainer, Dimitri Kirnos, to which she stated: "Although I grew up in a small town, at age 18 I decided to become a professional boxer and moved away from home [...] Of course, it was not easy at first, but I knew I could do it if I pulled it off." When Hammer was growing up, she admired Gennady Golovkin and Wladimir Klitschko as athletes, while stating she too admired "strong women like Jennifer Lopez who built their own empire".

== Amateur career ==
Hammer competed for Eschwege Boxing Club at a number of German tournaments, in which she defeated the 2007 German junior champion, receiving a unanimous victory over former German champion Manon Rohrbach at 63 kg, and winning the International German Junior Championships in Berlin by defeating Madelyn Cibis (BC Oberhavel) RSC–1 at 75 kg. In August 2008, she went to Eichstätt in which she competed in the German Women's Championships, where she won silver after defeating Silke Huenecke 28–7 and Janine Hoffmann 19–12, however, once proceeding to the final she lost by one point against Nikolina Orlovic 13–14. Hammer initially finished her amateur career with a record of 22 wins and 1 loss. In February 2021, she returned to the amateur ranks with the intention of competing at the Tokyo Olympics. She failed to qualify for the Tokyo Olympics.

=== International German Junior Championships ===
2007

- Defeated Madelyn Cibis (Germany) RSC–1

=== German National Championships ===
2008

- Defeated Silke Huenecke (Germany) (27–2)
- Defeated Janine Hoffmann (Germany) (19–12)
- Lost to Nikolina Orlovic (Croatia) (13–14)

== Professional career ==
=== Early career ===
After winning her silver medal at the German National Championships, Hammer had briefly considered competing in the 2012 London Olympics, but her ambition to become a super champion was greater. Hammer made her professional debut at the age of 19 on 12 September 2009 at the Gewerbehof Schlutius in Magdeburg against German fighter Melisa Koktar, whom Hammer defeated via technical knockout (TKO) in the second round. On 24 October 2009 at the Anhalt Arena in Dessau, Hammer won a four-round unanimous decision over Czech fighter Sarka Stoklaskova, who fell to 2-8 (1 KO) with the loss. Until 23 October 2010, she went on to have five more fights in the space of eleven months, defeating Marija Pejakovic, Daniela Bickei, Patricia Braesick, Marie Riederer, and Mihaela Dragan all via knockout within five rounds.

==== Hammer vs. Perozzi ====
On 23 October 2010, Hammer stepped up her level of competition and faced Teresa Perozzi for the vacant WBO middleweight title at Erdgas Arena in Riesa, Germany, with the fight shown on Sport1. Southpaw Perozzi began the fight by applying a lot of pressure and setting a fast pace which forced Hammer to think more about defense than in her previous fights. The action was even at first, however, Hammer began to score repeatedly to the head of Perozzi in the later rounds. Perozzi kept trying to press her offense but Hammer's right delivered the better shots in a fight that often looked closer than the scorecards suggested. Hammer won a ten-round unanimous decision 98–92, 97–93, and 97–93 to become the youngest German boxing world champion, and the youngest boxer in history to win a WBO title.

==== Hammer vs. Kiss ====
On 18 February 2011, Hammer added the vacant WBF middleweight title to her belt collection, on the undercard of Jan Zaveck defending his IBF welterweight title against Paul Delgado at the Stožice Sports Park in Ljubljana, Slovenia, when Kiss retired in her corner between the seventh and eighth rounds of a scheduled ten-rounder. Hammer started aggressively and used her reach to control the action. In the second half of the fight Hammer increased the pressure and Kiss began to bleed from her nose. During the round break, Kiss signaled to her trainer that she was no longer willing to continue, thus Hammer winning by a TKO.

==== Hammer vs. Lindberg, Living ====
On 27 May 2011, at Zlatopramen Arena in the Czech Republic, Hammer defended her WBO and WBF middleweight titles in a ten-round contest against the reigning undefeated WIBA and WIBF light-middleweight champion Maria Lindberg, which Hammer won by unanimous decision, however, Lindberg spoke to WBAN of how she felt the fight was much closer than the official scores 97–93, 97–93, and 98–92. On 21 October 2011, at the Brandenburg Halle in Frankfurt, Germany, Hammer won a ten-round unanimous decision over American Vashon Living, defending her the WBO and WBF middleweight titles. Living, who was at a significant size disadvantage, was mobile and agile as she attempted to get to close quarters and work inside, but Hammer was still able use her reach advantage to control the pace. Hammer landed two accurate uppercuts in the seventh and Living appeared to be worn down by the taller Hammer's blows in the closing rounds.

==== Hammer vs. Tshabalala, Hernandez ====
On 5 April 2012, at the Sportovní hala Vodova in Brno, Czech Republic, Hammer made her third defense of her WBF and WBO middleweight titles, in which she impressively dominated the proceedings to retain her titles with a unanimous decision win over Julie Tshabalala of South Africa. Hammer had predicted a knockout victory, with Tshabalala taking the fight on the inside to avoid the long range and hard straight shots from Hammer, who adjusted nicely and countered with hooks and uppercuts. Tshabalala had her best moments in rounds six and seven, and seemed to be catching her second wind, but Hammer was back on top in the final three rounds, making Tshabalala miss and pay for her mistakes. The judges Zoltan Enyedi, Manuel Oliver Palomo, and Andre Van Grootenbruel scored the fight 99–91, 100–90, and 100–90 all in favour of the defending WBF and WBO middleweight champion.

After Hammer beat Tshabalala, it was announced that Hammer would defend her titles at the RWE Rhein-Ruhr Sporthalle in Muelheim, Nordrhein-Westfalen, Germany against Yahaira Hernandez on 7 September 2012. Hammer came in at 70.3 kilograms, while Hernandez weighed a few grams too much in first gear, to which her manager, Daniel Born, acted resolutely and cut off the boxer's pigtails, which resulted in the weight being corrected to the point. Hammer won an overwhelming ten-round unanimous decision over Yahaira Hernandez. Hammer's technical superiority was clear despite a game effort by Hernandez, who was knocked down in the fourth, ninth, and tenth rounds. Hernandez, who had two points deducted for holding as well as 10–8 losing rounds because of the three knockdowns. Afterwards, Hammer spoke of her intention to knock Hernandez out, but she could not do so, though she stated she was happy with her performance. Hernandez was complimentary of Hammer, in which she stated "I was surprised by the toughness of Hammer, and she really hits hard. Her punches felt as if she had rocks in her gloves."

=== Super middleweight ===
==== Hammer vs. Zatyko ====
In April 2013, Hammer announced that she would fight 32 year old undefeated Zita Zatyko, who was considered the best female super-middleweight boxer in the world, on 4 May 2013 for the WBF and vacant WBO female super-middleweight titles. Of the scheduled encounter, Hammer stated that "My goal is to become the best champion in boxing, pound-for-pound, and winning my second world title in two weight classes by beating Zatyko will be another step towards realizing that goal." The date set for the return would mean Hammer would be fighting on the undercard of Wladimir Klitschko defending his WBA (Super), IBF, WBO, IBO, The Ring, and lineal heavyweight titles against Francesco Pianeta at the SAP Arena in Mannheim. Hammer put on a dominant performance and used her superior boxing skills to outbox the heavier Zatyko. In round four, Hammer scored a knockdown, and only the bell saved the visibly hurt, but brave, Zatyko. In the following rounds Hammer went on the attack, but Zatyko weathered the storm and after ten rounds of top-class boxing, judges Patricia Morse Jarman, Zoltan Enyedi, and Oliver Brien scored the fight 100–89, 99–90, and 99–90 all in favour of the new super-middleweight champion.

=== Return to middleweight ===
==== Hammer vs. Lauren ====
It was announced on 14 June 2013, Hammer was to drop the extra five and a half pounds to 157 and challenge Mikaela Laurén from Sweden on 13 July 2013, on the undercard of Robert Stieglitz's defense of his WBO super-middleweight title against Yuzo Kiyota at the EnergieVerbund Arena in Dresden. The fight was fought against a backdrop of antagonism displayed by the contender Lauren kissing Hammer at the weigh in, though Hammer laughed off the behavior stating "I have never witnessed anything like this. I hope I could punish her a bit for the kiss." Lauren adopted a particularly aggressive style and by no means hid herself, to which a violent exchange in blows ensued. While it was a tough battle between two world class boxers it was clear that Hammer was the better fighter in almost every round. Lauren tried everything she could to get the upper hand, but Hammer was effective with hard counter combinations and rarely let her opponent get the better of the exchanges. After ten entertaining rounds of boxing, judges Frank Michael Maass, Terry O'Connor, and Alejandro Lopez scored the bout 100–90, 99–91, and 98–92 all in favour of the defending champion, who improved her spotless record to 15–0. As Hammer made her fifth defense of the WBO title by defeating Lauren, the WBO President Francisco Varcarcel awarded her with the WBO Diamond Ring for her exceptional performance.

==== Hammer vs. Toscano ====
Following Hammer's middleweight comeback win against Mikaela Laurén in June 2013, Hammer spoke of her desire to fight Nikki Adler next at 168 pounds, albeit excuses on Adler's part, as well as possibly facing Cecilia Brækhus at a catchweight. Hammer remarked that both fighters are in her sights whilst stating "[...] I want to be the considered best female fighter around! I had my step up to super-middleweight and show I can be successful in more than one division but now I am back at middleweight, closer to Anne Sophie's weight class. We are similar in size and this fight can be made [...]" On 6 December 2013, Hammer retained her WBO and WBF female middleweight titles with a first-round knockout over Carmen Garcia Toscano at the Brandenburg Halle in Frankfurt. Both Hammer and Garcia weighed in at an equal 72.5 kg. Toscano found difficulties in approaching Hammer due to her size disadvantages and had already received hard hits in the immediate starting phase. Within the middle of the round, Toscano could no longer avoid the blows of Hammer and was unable to defend himself on the ropes, which is why Referee Ingo Barrabas intervened. After the fight, Hammer stated that a knockout is always the best option, whilst remarking "I'm sorry for the audience that things went so fast. I still have many goals and would like to see some super-middleweight opponents standing in front of me. The future is open."

==== Hammer vs. Balogun ====
It was announced on 27 January 2014, that Hammer was set to make her seventh title-defense against challenger Jessica Balogun on 1 March 2014, at the GETEC Arena in Magdeburg. Balogun, moving up from 147 pounds, insisted that the added weight would make her stronger; as Hammer had never faced anybody with her style, Balogun believed that she would be able to cause an upset. The fight would take place as an undercard fight to the WBO super-middleweight title fight between Robert Stieglitz and Arthur Abraham. Hammer had a four-inch height advantage over Balogun, which she exploited over the course of the ten-round fight; she kept Balogun at an arm's distance while landing straight punches from the outside. Balogun tried to take the fight to the inside, but ran into Hammer's uppercuts and hooks, resulting in a one-sided unanimous decision victory 100–90 on all three judges' scorecards. With the win, Hammer improved her record to (17–0, 8 KOs), while essentially cleaning out the middleweight division. The match up was promoted by SES Boxing and televised live in Germany on Sat.1, which averaged 4.20 million viewers while obtaining 23.9% of the market share.

=== Light middleweight ===
==== Hammer vs. Mathis ====
On 8 June 2014, Hammer was on Cecilia Brækhus' list as a possible opponent, alongside Alejandra Oliveras and Ivana Habazin, of whom Brækhus stated "[...] she also want me in the ring. She has said she will not box outside Germany, now I boxed in Germany, so maybe she will be more interested now." In June 2014, it was announced that Hammer would face the former multiple world and European champion Anne Sophie Mathis (27–3–0, 23 KOs) for the WBF and vacant WBO junior-middleweight titles on 26 July 2014 at the Anhalt Arena in Dessau. On 23 June 2014, at the SES Boxing Gala, Hammer commented, "I want to set new standards in women's boxing. Mathis is, of course, in this new weight class for me a real size with a huge knockout ratio. I put out the challenge to fight the best. There are enough women who runaway repeatedly in front of me." In preparation, Hammer briefly moved her training camp from Germany to the mountains of Tyrol, Austria, to engage in high-altitude training with coach Dimitri Kirnos.

In a relatively balanced fight between Hammer and Mathis, Hammer was clinching after an exchange in the fifth round, during which Mathis landed several right-hand blows to Hammer's left ear. Hammer went down to the canvas and struggled to come back to her feet. The assigned referee, Manfred Kuechler, failed to count Hammer out after she required 25 seconds to erect herself properly from the canvas. Instead, Kuechler ruled the punch that knocked Hammer down an illegal blow to the back of the head and disqualified Mathis. Hammer won the WBF and vacant WBO junior-middleweight titles via a controversial DQ over Mathis. Due to Hammer's excessive clinching, Mathis legally used her free hand to land blows to the side of Hammer's head, sending her to the canvas. The slow motion replay showed that it was Hammer who had fouled by holding Mathis' left arm. Fans were outraged and declared that Mathis had been robbed of a KO victory. Mathis insisted that her punches were legal. Hammer expressed that she did not want to become a champion through disqualification.

On 28 July 2014, the World Boxing Federation's declared the bout a 'no-contest' and restored the WBF light-middleweight title to Mathis. Martin André, the president of the French Boxing Federation, stated that he would make a complaint to the WBO to validate the victory of Mathis; he asserted that he was ready to ban the WBF in France. On 29 July 2014, the sanctioning commission, the Bund Deutscher Berufsboxer (BDB; Association of German Professional Boxers), followed the WBF decision and officially changed the bout outcome to 'no-contest'. BDB President Thomas Pütz apologised for the "bad decision" and stated that there would be an investigation of the said event and a hearing of Manfred Küchler to determine whether he would be suspended. On 7 August 2014, after reviewing the bout, the WBO agreed with the WBF and BDB and declared it a 'no-contest'; they did not order a rematch, since Hammer was the organization's reigning middleweight champion.

=== Returning to middleweight ===
==== Hammer vs. Reis, Lazar ====
On 23 January 2015, it was announced that SES Boxing would present its milestone 100th boxing event on 7 March at the Maritim Hotel in Magdeburg, with Hammer being included on the card. On 27 January 2015, it was announced that Hammer would make her eighth defense of her WBO title at the Maritim Hotel in Magdeburg against world No. 2 Kali Reis. In March 2015, the flu epidemic in Germany had caused Hammer and several other fighters to cancel their scheduled fights at the Maritim Hotel for 7 March, which was later changed to 5 May. At the weigh-in, Reis, 29, was 155 and a half pounds, the heaviest she had weighed professionally; Hammer, 24, came in heavier at 157 and three-quarter pounds. After the weigh-in, Hammer commented that Ries was "aggressive and usually wants to take the fight in. But she will not succeed with me, I'm better and I'm number 1 [...] I'm merciless." Hammer, faster than Ries, dominated for nine rounds. She took advantage of her greater range, built with the grueling left-hand guide, with which she kept Ries at a distance. However, before the end of the tenth round, a right hook from Reis hit Hammer's temple and she went down. Hammer came to her feet quickly, bringing the fight controlled to an end, with Jose Ignacio Martinez Antunez, Frank Michael Maass, and Matteo Montella scoring the bout 98–91 to secure Hammer a unanimous decision victory. After the fight, of her knockdown, Hammer stated: "That's how it is in boxing, one second of inattention, and it's all over. You can only learn from it."

In February 2016, at the Dortmund Sportsman of the Year awards, Hammer spoke of her intention of fighting for the WBC title, as well as possibly moving up to super-middleweight, with conformation in June 2016 that Hammer will have an eight-round bout and within October a world title fight. Hungarian Melinda Lazar became a front runner to challenge Hammer, to which, on 20 June, it was confirmed to take place at the Ballhaus Forum in Munich on 15 July. This would make Hammer's first time fighting at the arena and her first fight in fourteen months. Lazar sent Hammer to the canvas in round two, but otherwise Lazar struggled against the technique, range and strength of Hammer. In the sixth round, Lazar's trainer threw in the towel to protect his fighter. Speaking after the fight, Hammer said, "It was not that big of an opponent, but everything was going according to plan for me and now it can only go up and now I want to fight Nikki Adler and become world champion again."

=== Unified world middleweight champion ===
==== Hammer vs. Reis II ====
In September 2016, Hammer mentioned possible opponents for her next bout: first, WBC Silver champion Kelly Morgan, as well as a rematch with WBC champion Kali Reis to unify the WBO and the WBC titles. On 20 October 2016, it was announced that Hammer would face Reis at the Ballhaus Forum in Munich on 5 November. The smaller Reis was aggressive from the opening to the final bell, moving forward and landing hard hooks to Hammer's head and body. But for most of the ten rounds Hammer managed to maintain distance, establish her jab and fight from the outside. After ten entertaining rounds judges Ed Pearson, Fernando Laguna, and Grzegorz Molenda unanimously scored the bout 98–93, 98–93, and 100–90 all in favour of Hammer. According to CompuBox, Hammer's usage of her mobility and prolific jab allowed for 24.4 attempts/3.8 connects per two-minute round, while slowing the pace to a comfortable level in which she averaged 39.7 punches per two-minute round and limited Reis to 33.4. Speaking after her unification, Hammer said, "I have been waiting for this moment for a very long time [...] Like every fighter in the world I dreamed of becoming a WBC world champion and winning the green and gold Belt. This is a very special moment for me. I thank all my fans and my team for the fantastic support."

==== Hammer vs. Lindberg II, Ankrah ====
On 27 February 2017, it was announced that Hammer would rematch Maria Lindberg (15-2-2, 8 KO) to make her first defense of both the WBO and WBC unified middleweight titles, on the undercard of Marco Huck's defense of his IBO and vacant WBC cruiserweight titles against Mairis Briedis at the Westfalenhallen in Dortmund on 1 April. Of the encounter, Lindberg stated that "Hammer is difficult to box. But I'm a better boxer than 2011 and I think I'll have a good chance against her. This is my last chance for a big title and I'm ready to use it." While Hammer also noted that Lindberg is indeed a tough opponent "[...] And of course I know that I can not rely only on the support of the audience. I'm going to work so hard like never before and get ready to get in the ring." At the weigh-in, Lindberg, 29 at the time of the fight, weighed in at 154 and a quarter pounds, the heaviest she had weighed since 2015; Hammer, 24, came in heavier at 158 and three-quarter pounds. Hammer had no issues whatsoever with Lindberg, handily outboxing her shorter opponent from range. In front of a crowd of 17,000 in attendance, Lindberg simply could not get past Hammer's stinging jab and the combinations she put together behind them, ultimately losing all ten rounds on all three scorecards, with judges Massimo Barrovecchio, Guido Cavalleri, and Eddie Pappoe scoring the fight 100–90 all in favour of the defending WBO and WBC champion. In the post-fight interview, Lindberg stated, "Hammer is difficult to box [...] I tried to get in to her but it didn't succeed and it didn't get any better when I got her skull in the middle of my nose, thinking it was in the fourth round. One is not particularly keen on going into stroke switching with a broken nose. It made a lot of pain during the rest of the match." After the fight, Hammer spoke of how fighting in her hometown of Westfalenhalle was a dream come true, while stating she wants to realise her next dream and go to the US. At the subsequent press conference, Hammer's manager Harald Pia announced that Hammer's next series of fights will take place in America, to eventually culminate with an eventual showdown with Olympic champion Claressa Shields. On 31 October 2017, it was reported by Pia that Hammer has a concrete offer for four bouts in America, all being transmitted by either HBO or Showtime.

On 4 November 2017, Hammer retained her WBO and WBC middleweight titles with a fourth-round knockout win over Gifty Amanua Ankrah at the SportScheck Allwetteranlage in Munich. Of her encounter with Ankrah, Hammer stated: "[...] I have to beat [Ankrah], step by step, fight by fight [...] I am very well prepared, I know what I have to do, I am in my area in the ring, I feel good there." Hammer brutally stopped Ankrah with a brutal right at the end of the fourth round, which sent her to the canvas. Ankrah stood up, trying to continue in the contest, but her legs were shaking and the fight was suspended by referee Juergen Langos. In the post-fight interview, Hammer praised Ankrah's toughness by stating, "[Ankrah] is a very tough boxer, I've never felt a head harder than hers. My hands hurt, it was a good test and a good warm-up for my trip to the United States.", while hoping that Shields watches fight tape to know what is coming for her.

==== Hammer vs. Nelson ====
On 14 December 2017, The Ring reported that Hammer will make her U.S. debut on 12 January, against Lisa Noel Garland (15–9, 8 KOs), with the fight to take place at the Turning Stone Resort & Casino, in Verona, New York, with Hammer stating: "The U.S. debut is very important for me; I want to show that I'm the real deal in female boxing. Ever since I won my first title, it has always been a dream of mine to fight in the U.S.A [...] I want to fight both Cornejo and Shields in the future. I train hard and I'm ready to fight everyone." On 18 December 2017, Dmitriy Salita announced of Hammer to a multi-fight promotional contract with Salita Promotions, with Hammer making her US debut 12 January 2018 at the Turning Stone Resort Casino in Verona, New York. In January 2018, The Ring reported that Hammer was due to appear on the undercard of Claressa Shields vs Tori Nelson on 12 January, however, due to a delay in her work via, Hammer will have to wait to the spring for her United States debut. On 24 April 2018, The Guardian announced that Hammer was set to defend her WBO and WBC middleweight titles against former champion Tori Nelson at the Detroit Masonic Temple in Detroit, Michigan, on 22 June, with the fight shown on Showtime.

After the announcement, Hammer had revealed she spent much of her camp in Tyrol, Austria, to engage in high-altitude training in preparation for Nelson. At the official weigh-in, a day before the fight, Hammer tipped the scales at 159.5 lbs, while Nelson weighed 157.5 lbs. Hammer exploited her height and reach advantages by keeping the fight at long range but moving inside just often enough to win the majority of the exchanges. Her jab landed with frequency and heavier force than in past fights, and her right hand connected with enough impact to make the point but not enough to upend Nelson. Judges Katealia Chambers, Benoit Roussel, and Pasquale Procopio scored the fight 99–91, 99–91, and 100–90 all in favour of the defending WBO and WBC champion. Hammer's defeat of Nelson made her the first German fighter to successfully defend a world title in the US since Max Schmeling successfully defended his heavyweight title against Young Stribling at the Municipal Stadium, Cleveland, Ohio, in 1931. According to The Ring, Hammer averaged 46.6 punches per round while limiting Nelson to 31.8; she prevailed at 103–56 overall, with 44–18 jabs and 59–38 power. The accuracy figures were sub-par (22% overall, 19% jabs, 26% power) but her defensive skills limited Nelson to just 18% overall, 16% jabs and 19% power. Hammer throttled down from 53 punches in round nine to 36 in the 10th. In the post-fight interview, Hammer discussed attempting to get the knockout, praising Nelson's toughness. She also commented on her upcoming fight, stating, "I'm really looking forward to fighting [Shields]. She will try and fight me on the inside but my footwork and my reach will make the difference [...] It will be the biggest women's fight ever. I would like to fight her at a neutral site." On 24 April 2018, Dan Rafael of ESPN stated that Hammer and Shields, both being victorious, will fight for the undisputed middleweight title this fall on Showtime.

=== Undisputed middleweight championship ===
==== Hammer vs. Shields ====
From March 2017 up until the end of August 2018, both camps of Hammer and Shields were in deep talks around the super fight to finally take place. On 25 September 2018, The Ring announced that Hammer and Shields will fight for undisputed middleweight championship at the Adrian Phillips Theater at Boardwalk Hall in Atlantic City, New Jersey, on 17 November, with the winner becoming the second woman of the four-belt era to hold all the titles in one division. Of the announcement, Hammer remarked: "I am the best middleweight in the world and will make that point very clear when we get in the ring. It's been my dream to fight in the biggest women's fight of all time and raise women's boxing to an all-time high. I will be crowned the undisputed middleweight queen [...]" On 2 October 2018, Dan Rafael of ESPN reported that an undisclosed medical condition had forced Hammer to postpone her fight with Shields for the undisputed championship. On 5 October the WBC stated that Hammer suffered from a digestive ailment, making her medically unfit to box for the foreseeable future. The WBC named Hammer champion in recess, while Shields will fight for the vacant title on 17 November against Hannah Rankin.

On 27 January 2019, it was announced that Hammer would fight Elene Sikmashvili at the Verti Music Hall in Friedrichshain on 9 February, as Hammer wished to box in Germany before fighting Shields sometime in 2019. The eighth-round fight was decided by technical knockout in the second round after thirty-five seconds, with Hammer stopping Sikmashvili. On 12 February 2019, it was announced that Hammer and Shields will meet for the undisputed championship on 13 April at the Adrian Phillips Theater at Boardwalk Hall in Atlantic City, New Jersey, with The Ring female middleweight title also being contested. After the announcement, Hammer revealed she spent much of her camp at Seefeld in Tyrol, Austria, to engage in high-altitude training in preparation for Shields. The official press conference took place on 26 February, with Hammer remarking the big risk to come from Germany to the U.S., while stating: "[...] I believe the best should fight the best and I did what I had to so that this could happen. This fight can be a game changer for our sport."

On 13 April 2019, Hammer lost the WBC and WBO titles via unanimous decision in her bid to become the undisputed women's middleweight champion. All three judges scored the bout 98–92 in favour of Shields.

== Personal life ==
Hammer has lived in Dortmund, Germany, since 2009. In July 2012, Hammer received her certificate of having passed her Abitur, which allowed her to study sports science at the University of Applied Management in Unna. While in her sixth-semester at the University of Hagen, in 2016, she stated she makes a great effort to complete her studies while boxing. She is a brand ambassador for the underwear line Anita, for which she occasionally models, while also being a part of Movement130, which encourages females of all shapes, sizes, and lifestyles to embrace their own distinctive beauty. In 2017 Christina Hammer and SOFTSWISS launch an iGaming service in partnership with WBC. Hammer is a patron of Vive Žene, a facility for refugees, threatened girls, and young women at the Ossenbrink in Herdecke, with the Dortmund Equality Office suggesting that "a female boxer is just right to express power and power." While becoming the first female boxer to own an online casino, she donates 5% of her online casino income to World Boxing Cares and to the Jose Sulaiman Relief Fund for needy boxers, to which she became a WBC Ambassador, whereby she stated: "My Casino will use its popularity also as a platform for good works. I am very impressed with WBC Cares and their work for global good, particularly children [...] it's my privilege to give back."

== Professional boxing record ==
30 fights	28 wins	1 loss
By knockout	13	0
By decision	15	1
No contests	1	

No.	Result	Record	Opponent	Type	Round, time	Date	Location	Notes
30	Win	28–1 (1)	(Russia) Luiza Davydova	UD	8	7 May 2022	Sartory Sale Koln, Cologne, Germany	
29	Win	27–1 (1)	(Brazil) Daniele Bastieri	TKO	1 (8)	3 Dec 2021	Harzlandhalle, Ilsenburg, Germany	
28	Win	26–1 (1)	(Finland) Sanna Turunen	KO	7 (10), 0:40	20 Dec 2020	Motorworld, Cologne, Germany	Won vacant WIBF super-middleweight title
27	Win	25–1 (1)	(Kenya) Florence Muthoni	UD	8	8 Feb 2020	EWS Arena, Göppingen, Germany	
26	Loss	24–1 (1)	(United States) Claressa Shields	UD	10	13 Apr 2019	(United States) Boardwalk Hall, Atlantic City, New Jersey, US	Lost WBO female middleweight title; For WBA, WBC, IBF, and inaugural The Ring female middleweight titles
25	Win	24–0 (1)	(Georgia (country)) Elene Sikmashvili	TKO	2 (8), 0:35	9 Feb 2019	Verti Music Hall, Friedrichshain, Germany	
24	Win	23–0 (1)	(United States) Tori Nelson	UD	10	22 Jun 2018	(United States) Detroit Masonic Temple, Detroit, Michigan, US	Retained WBC and WBO female middleweight titles
23	Win	22–0 (1)	(Ghana) Gifty Amanua Ankrah	KO	4 (10), 1:59	4 Nov 2017	SportScheck Allwetteranlage, Munich, Germany	Retained WBC and WBO female middleweight titles
22	Win	21–0 (1)	(Sweden) Maria Lindberg	UD	10	1 Apr 2017	Westfalenhallen, Dortmund, Germany	Retained WBC and WBO female middleweight titles
21	Win	20–0 (1)	(United States) Kali Reis	UD	10	5 Nov 2016	Ballhaus Forum, Munich, Germany	Retained WBO female middleweight title; Won WBC female middleweight title
20	Win	19–0 (1)	(Hungary) Melinda Lazar	TKO	6 (8), 1:25	15 Jul 2016	Ballhaus Forum, Munich, Germany	
19	Win	18–0 (1)	(United States) Kali Reis	UD	10	2 May 2015	Sparkassen-Arena, Jena, Germany	Retained WBO female middleweight title
18	NC	17–0 (1)	(France) Anne Sophie Mathis	NC	5 (10), 0:25	26 Jul 2014	Anhalt Arena, Dessau, Germany	For WBF and vacant WBO female light-middleweight titles; Originally DQ win for Hammer due to rabbit punches; later ruled a NC
17	Win	17–0	(Germany) Jessica Balogun	UD	10	1 Mar 2014	Bordelandhalle, Magdeburg, Germany	Retained WBO and WBF female middleweight titles
16	Win	16–0	(Mexico) Carmen Garcia Toscano	TKO	1 (10), 1:42	6 Dec 2013	Brandenburg Halle, Frankfurt, Germany	Retained WBO and WBF female middleweight titles
15	Win	15–0	(Sweden) Mikaela Laurén	UD	10	13 Jul 2013	EnergieVerbund Arena, Dresden, Germany	Retained WBO and WBF female middleweight titles
14	Win	14–0	(Hungary) Zita Zatyko	UD	10	4 May 2013	SAP Arena, Mannheim, Germany	Won WBF and vacant WBO female super-middleweight titles
13	Win	13–0	(Dominican Republic) Yahaira Hernandez	UD	10	7 Sep 2012	RWE Rhein-Ruhr Sporthalle, Mülheim, Germany	Retained WBO and WBF female middleweight titles
12	Win	12–0	(South Africa) Julie Tshabalala	UD	10	5 Apr 2012	Sportovní hala Vodova, Brno, Czech Republic	Retained WBO and WBF female middleweight titles
11	Win	11–0	(United States) Vashon Living	UD	10	21 Oct 2011	Brandenburg Halle, Frankfurt, Germany	Retained WBO and WBF female middleweight titles
10	Win	10–0	(Sweden) Maria Lindberg	UD	10	27 May 2011	Zlatopramen Arena, Ústí nad Labem, Czech Republic	Retained WBO and WBF female middleweight titles
9	Win	9–0	(Hungary) Diana Kiss	RTD	7 (10), 2:00	18 Feb 2011	Stožice Sports Park, Ljubljana, Slovenia	Won vacant WBF female middleweight title
8	Win	8–0	(Bermuda) Teresa Perozzi	UD	10	23 Oct 2010	Erdgas Arena, Riesa, Germany	Won vacant WBO female middleweight title
7	Win	7–0	(Romania) Mihaela Dragan	TKO	2 (6)	4 Sep 2010	Stožice Sports Park, Ljubljana, Slovenia	
6	Win	6–0	(Germany) Marie Riederer	KO	5 (6), 1:23	4 Jun 2010	Landesgartenschau, Aschersleben, Germany	
5	Win	5–0	(Germany) Patricia Braesick	TKO	2 (6), 1:01	17 Apr 2010	Bordelandhalle, Magdeburg, Germany	
4	Win	4–0	(Serbia) Daniela Bickei	TKO	4 (6)	9 Apr 2010	Tivoli Hall, Ljubljana, Slovenia	
3	Win	3–0	(Serbia) Marija Pejakovic	TKO	4 (4)	15 Nov 2009	EKZ Arena, Schöneweide, Germany	
2	Win	2–0	(Czech Republic) Sarka Stoklaskova	UD	4	24 Oct 2009	Anhalt Arena, Dessau, Germany	
1	Win	1–0	(Germany) Melisa Koktar	TKO	2 (4)	12 Sep 2009	Gewerbehof Schlutius, Magdeburg, Germany	

Sporting positions
Minor world boxing titles
New title	WBF female middleweight champion 18 February 2011 – 14 October 2017; Vacated	Vacant Title next held by Ema Kozin
Vacant Title last held by Zita Zatyko	WBF female super-middleweight champion 4 May 2013 – 30 November 2013; Vacated	Vacant Title next held by Nikki Adler
Major world boxing titles
New title	WBO female super-middleweight champion 4 May 2013 – 12 May 2018; Vacated	Vacant Title next held by Femke Hermans
Preceded by Kali Reis	WBC female middleweight champion 5 November 2016 – 17 November 2018; Vacated	Vacant Title next held by Claressa Shields
New title	WBO female middleweight champion 23 October 2010 – 13 April 2019	Succeeded by Claressa Shields
Awards
Previous: Ramona Kuehne	WBF Female Fighter of the Year; 2011	Next: Holly Holm
Previous: Myriam Lamare vs. Lucia Morelli	WBF Female Fight of the Year; 2011	Next: Holly Holm vs. Anne Sophie Mathis
New title	WBO Female Fighter of the Year; 2013	Incumbent
