= Amy Yuratovac =

American boxer

Personal information
- Nationality: American
- Born: December 7, 1982 (age 43) Hammond, Indiana, U.S.
- Weight: Welterweight

Boxing career

Boxing record
- Total fights: 9
- Wins: 6
- Win by KO: 6
- Losses: 3

Amy Yuratovac (born December 7, 1982) is an American former professional boxer who competed from 2005 to 2009 and challenged for the WBA and WBC female welterweight titles in 2009.

== Professional career ==
Yuratovac debuted in July 2005 and won her first five bouts by technical knockout. She then suffered her first loss to Christy Martin but rebounded with a win over Jasmine Davis. Yuratovac unsuccessfully challenged Cecilia Brækhus for the WBA and WBC world female welterweight titles on 30 May 2009, losing by unanimous decision.

== Professional boxing record ==
9 fights	6 wins	3 losses
By knockout	6	0
By decision	0	3

No.	Result	Record	Opponent	Type	Round, time	Date	Location	Notes
9	Loss	6–3	(Norway) Cecilia Brækhus	UD	10	May 30, 2009	Hartwall Arena, Helsinki, Finland	For WBA and WBC female welterweight titles
8	Loss	6–2	(United States) Mia St. John	MD	8	Jun 14, 2008	Palacio de los Deportes, Mexico City, Mexico	For vacant WBC International female welterweight title
7	Win	6–1	(United States) Jasmine Davis	TKO	1 (6), 1:05	Oct 13, 2007	(United States) Civic Center, Hammond, Indiana, U.S.	
6	Loss	5–1	(United States) Christy Martin	UD	6	Jun 2, 2007	(United States) L'Auberge du Lac Hotel and Cas, Lake Charles, Louisiana, U.S.	
5	Win	5–0	(United States) KeLah Pollari	TKO	2 (4), 1:39	Sep 1, 2006	(United States) The Park, Whiting, Indiana, U.S.	
4	Win	4–0	(United States) Crystal Martin	TKO	1 (4), 1:43	Jul 22, 2006	(United States) Farm Bureau Building, Indianapolis, Indiana, U.S.	
3	Win	3–0	(United States) Kimberly Jackson	TKO	1 (4), 1:48	Feb 28, 2006	(United States) Pepsi Coliseum, Indianapolis, Indiana, U.S.	
2	Win	2–0	(United States) Ebony Teague	TKO	1 (4), 1:25	Nov 3, 2005	(United States) Civic Center, Hammond, Indiana, U.S.	
1	Win	1–0	(United States) Ebony Teague	TKO	3 (4), 1:37	Jul 13, 2005	(United States) Majestic Star Casino, Gary, Indiana, U.S.	
