= Jessica Balogun =

German boxer

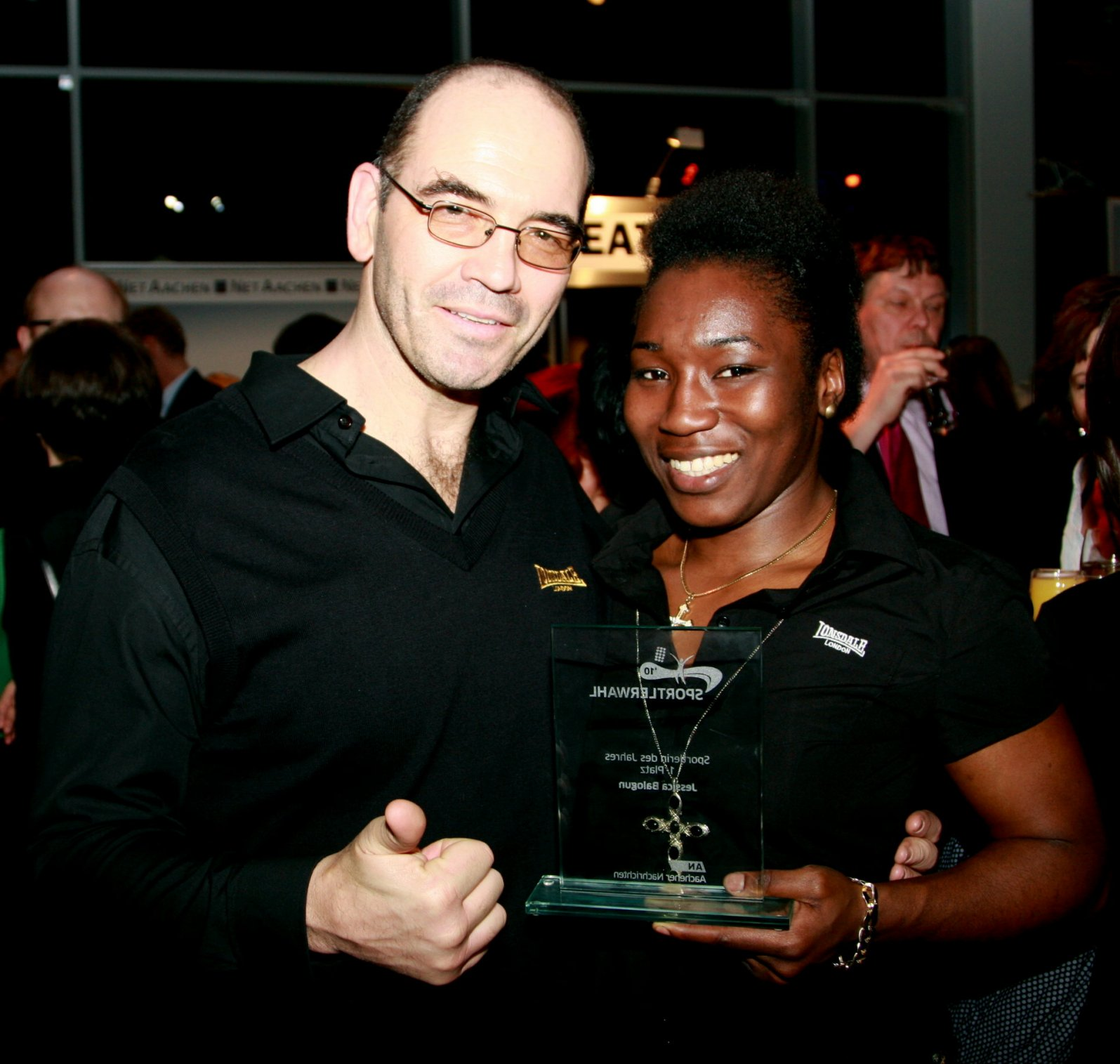
- Balogun in January 2010

Personal information
- Nicknames: The Hammer, Sugar J
- Nationality: German
- Born: Jessica Balogun; December 20, 1988 (age 37) Aachen, West Germany
- Weight: Super Featherweight

Boxing career
- Stance: Orthodox

Boxing record
- Total fights: 28
- Wins: 24
- Win by KO: 12
- Losses: 4
- Draws: 0
- No contests: 0

Jessica Balogun (born December 20, 1988) is a German professional boxer. She was a standout amateur and is now a world champion professional boxer.

== Early life ==
Balogun was born on December 20, 1988, in Aachen, West Germany. She is of Nigerian descent. Six months after Balogun's birth, she moved to Stuttgart with her mother. She found out about the boxing club, MTK Boxen Aachen, through a classmate while in school in Aachen.

== Amateur career ==
Balogun joined MTK Boxen Aachen in the summer of 2005. In her first competition, on April 1, 2006, she won the West German Championship with a knockout (KO) victory in round one. Six months later, she finished the 4th International German Women's Box Championships in Herrischried / Südbaden, and won the title of the International German Champion after her win in round two. She made Aachen sports history by being the first boxing champion of the old Kaiserstadt. In November 2006 Balogun won the International Women's boxing tournament, Baden Open, by two first-round KO victories. She won her fourth title in 2006, the Open Aachen City Championship. This time, she defeated her opponent in the third round with a knock-out.

== Professional career ==
At the beginning of 2008 Balogun became professional. On February 23, 2008, she had her first professional fight and fought her way through five victories in a row. On June 7, 2008, Balogun won the World Championship and World Championship title (WFC), as well as the world champion and super-welterweight champion, in the main contest of the 6th Hattersheimer Boxing Night against undefeated European champion Anja Henning. Balogun advanced to No. 5 with this victory in an independent computer world tournament. On 24 January 2009, Balogun conceded her 11th professional boxing match and won her second world title. In Port-au-Prince she also won the GBU World Junior Championship. She defeated her opponent Evelina Diaz in the 5th round with a knock-out. On November 29, 2008, she defended her WFC Super-Welterweight title against Tatjana Dieckmann in Aachen, by K.O., in round 4. After the GBU World Cup victory in Haiti, Balogun successfully defended the junior welterweight title against Daniela David from Romania.

In her 13th professional boxing match, she beat Olga Bojare from Latvia on September 5, 2009, for the vacant WFC welterweight title. She won with 100-90 points. The WFC welterweight title was then defended against Eva Halasi (Serbia, 21 November 2009), again Olga Bojare (March 13, 2010), and against Angel McKenzie (June 4, 2010) and Marija Pejakovic (Serbia). On 20 November 2010, Balogun also won the WIBA World title against the Spaniard Loli Muñoz. On December 3, 2011, she won the GBU world title against the Romanian Floarea Lihet.

On June 2, 2012, in Herning, Denmark, Balogun made her 24th Profibox fight. The opponent was Cecilia Brækhus, owner of the world championship belt of WBA, WBC, and WBO. Balogun lost after ten rounds, (22–2, 10 KOs) on points. Balogun also lost in Magdeburg against Christina Hammer, in March 2014. She defended the world title belt in super welterweight after the WFC on April 26, 2014, in Stolberg against Edita Lesnik from Bosnia-Herzegovina. Subsequently, Balogun had to defeat the Norwegian Braekhus again on June 7, 2014, in Schwerin.

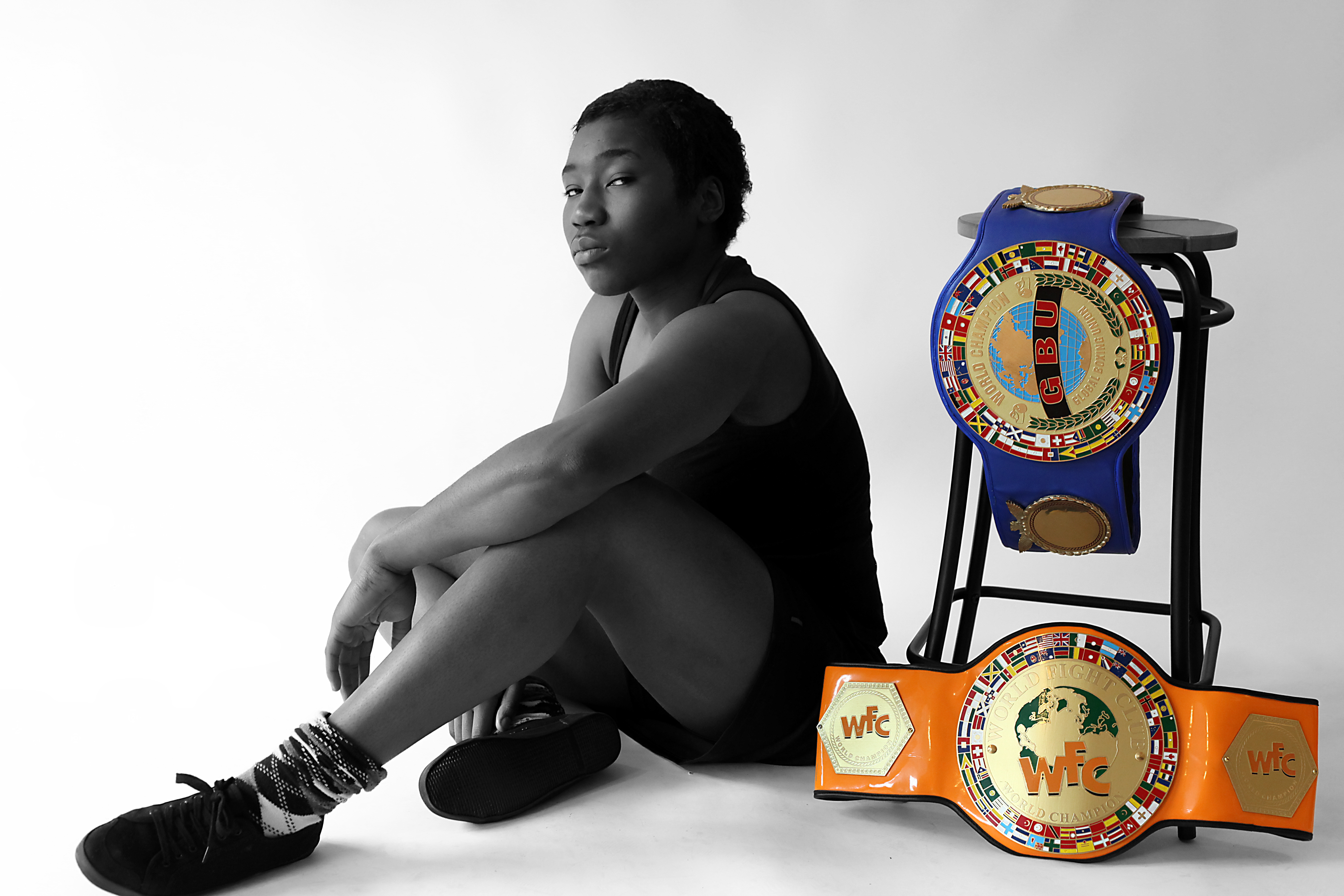
Jessica Balogun during amateur career

== Professional accomplishments ==
- 7/6/2008 - WFC European Super Welterweight (female)
- 1/24/2009 - GBU (European Champion) Junior Welterweight (Female)
- 11/20/2010 - WIBA (World Champion) Welterweight (female)

== Professional boxing record ==
| 28 fights | 24 wins | 4 losses |
|---|---|---|
| By knockout | 12 | 0 |
| By decision | 12 | 4 |

| No. | Result | Record | Opponent | Type | Round, time | Date | Location | Notes |
|---|---|---|---|---|---|---|---|---|
| 28 | Loss | 24–4 | (Norway) Cecilia Brækhus | UD | 10 | 7 Jun 2014 | (Germany) Sport- und Kongresshalle, Schwerin | For WBA female welterweight title; For WBC female welterweight title; For WBO female welterweight title |
| 27 | Win | 24–3 | (Bosnia and Herzegovina) Edita Karabeg | TKO | 2 (10), 1:45 | 26 Apr 2014 | (Germany) Museum Zinkhütter Hof, Aachen | |
| 26 | Loss | 23–3 | (Germany) Christina Hammer | UD | 10 | 1 Mar 2014 | (Germany) GETEC Arena, Magdeburg | For WBF female middleweight title; For WBO female middleweight title |
| 25 | Win | 23–2 | (Romania) Daniela David | KO | 5 (10), 1:10 | 16 Nov 2013 | (Germany) Aachen | |
| 24 | Loss | 22–2 | (Norway) Cecilia Brækhus | UD | 10 | 2 Jun 2012 | (Denmark) Herning Kongrescenter, Herning | For WBA female welterweight title; For WBC female welterweight title; For WBO female welterweight title |
| 23 | Win | 22–1 | (Romania) Floarea Lihet | UD | 10 | 3 Dec 2011 | (Germany) MTK Boxing Gym, Aachen | Won vacant GBU female welterweight title |
| 22 | Win | 21–1 | (Germany) Sarah Huebner | TKO | 4 (6), 1:14 | 8 Oct 2011 | (Germany) Karl Eckel Halle, Hattersheim am Main | |
| 21 | Win | 20–1 | (Germany) Adriana Tertilte | RTD | 3 (8) | 4 Jun 2011 | (Netherlands) Rodahal, Kerkrade | |
| 20 | Win | 19–1 | (Brazil) Leticia Candal | UD | 10 | 2 Apr 2011 | (Germany) Halle Wenau, Aachen | |
| 19 | Win | 18–1 | (Spain) Loli Munoz | UD | 10 | 20 Nov 2010 | (Germany) Aachen | Won vacant WIBA welterweight title |
| 18 | Win | 17–1 | (Russia) Angel McKenzie | TKO | 8 (10), 1:43 | 28 Aug 2010 | (Germany) Radsportakadamie Heinz Betz, Oeschelbronn | |
| 17 | Win | 16–1 | (Serbia) Marija Pejakovic | PTS | 10 | 1 Jul 2010 | (Germany) Fahrdorf | |
| 16 | Win | 15–1 | (Russia) Angel McKenzie | UD | 10 | 4 Jun 2010 | (Germany) Karl Eckel Halle, Hattersheim am Main | |
| 15 | Win | 14–1 | (Latvia) Olga Bojare | UD | 10 | 13 Mar 2010 | (Germany) JS-Wenau-Halle, Heistern | |
| 14 | Win | 13–1 | (Hungary) Eva Bajic | KO | 4 (10) | 21 Nov 2009 | (Germany) Aachen | |
| 13 | Win | 12–1 | (Latvia) Olga Bojare | PTS | 10 | 5 Sep 2009 | (Germany) Flughafen Merzbrück, Aachen | |
| 12 | Win | 11–1 | (Romania) Daniela David | UD | 10 | 30 May 2009 | (Germany) Daimler Benz Niederlassung, Aachen | Retained GBU female super lightweight title |
| 11 | Win | 10–1 | (Dominican Republic) Evelina Diaz | TKO | 5 (10) | 24 Jan 2009 | (Haiti) Trotyl Bar & Lounge, Pétion-Ville | Won vacant GBU female super lightweight title |
| 10 | Win | 9–1 | (Germany) Tatjana Dieckmann | KO | 4 (10) | 29 Nov 2008 | (Germany) Sportanlage JS-Wenau, Aachen | |
| 9 | Win | 8–1 | (Germany) Jaqueline Nowack | TKO | 4 (8) | 25 Oct 2008 | (Germany) Tai-Kien Gym, Aachen | |
| 8 | Win | 7–1 | (Germany) Verena Herrman | TKO | 2 (6) | 4 Oct 2008 | (Germany) Neuwieder Heimathaus, Neuwied | |
| 7 | Win | 6–1 | (Germany) Susanne Breuer | TKO | 4 (6) | 27 Sep 2008 | (Germany) Aachen | |
| 6 | Win | 5–1 | (Germany) Anja Henning | MD | 10 | 7 Jun 2008 | (Germany) Karl Eckel Halle, Hattersheim am Main | |
| 5 | Loss | 4–1 | (Belgium) Diane Schwachhofer | MD | 6 | 17 May 2008 | (Belgium) Salle Omnisport, Piéton | |
| 4 | Win | 4–0 | (Germany) Susanne Breuer | TKO | 2 (6) | 10 May 2008 | (Germany) LBN Boxstudio, Magdeburg | |
| 3 | Win | 3–0 | (Germany) Marina Kohlgruber | PTS | 6 | 26 Apr 2008 | (Germany) Ostfrieslandhalle, Leer | |
| 2 | Win | 2–0 | (Germany) Jaqueline Nowack | PTS | 4 | 12 Apr 2008 | (Germany) Neuwieder Heimathaus, Neuwied | |
| 1 | Win | 1–0 | (Germany) Manon Rohrbach | PTS | 4 | 23 Feb 2008 | (Germany) Josefshaus, Aachen | |
