= Colombia–Norway relations =

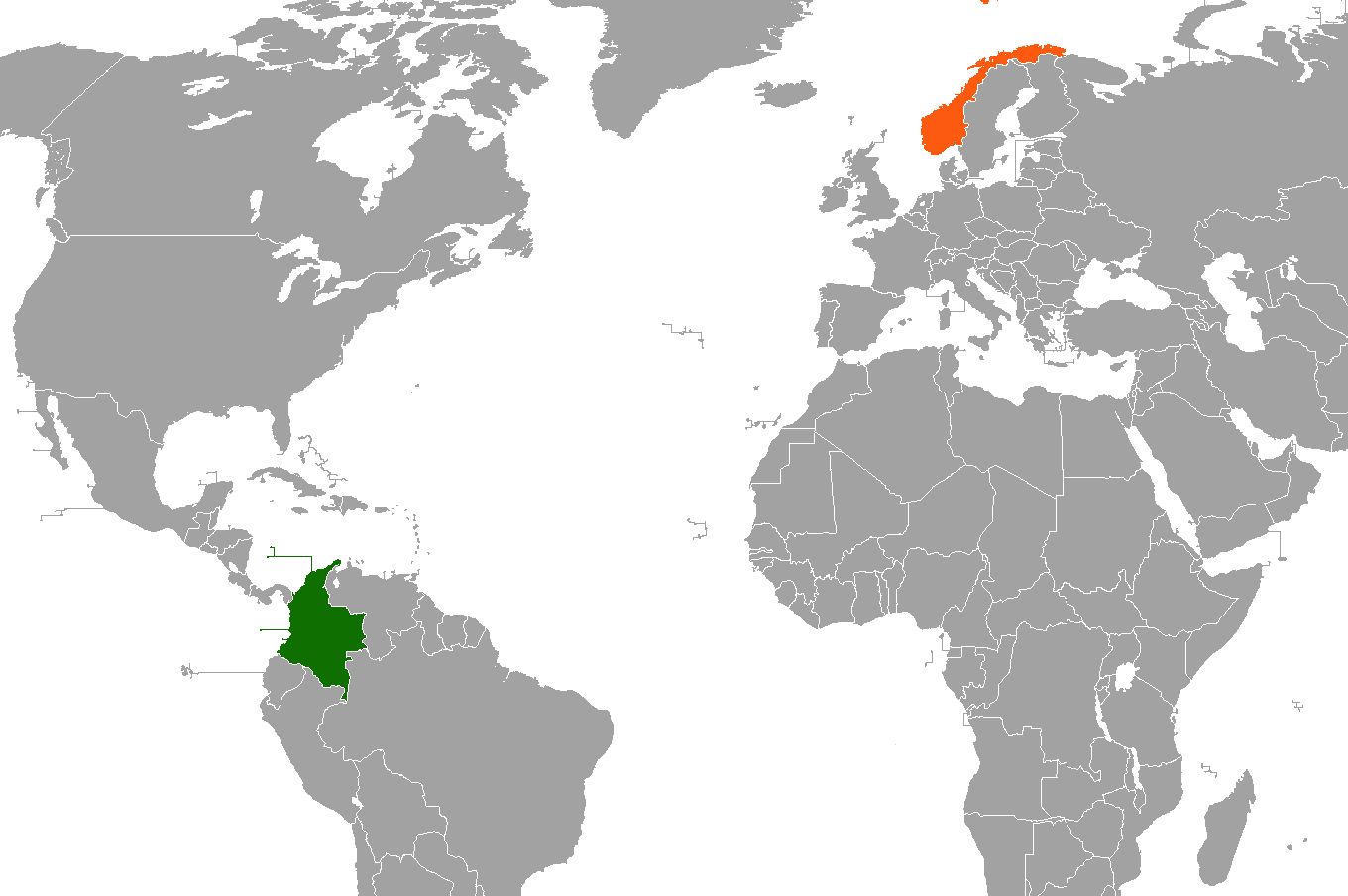
- Colombia: Norway

Diplomatic mission
- Embassy in Oslo: Embassy in Bogotá (Note: Norway closed its embassy in Colombia in mid-1960, to continue working in Venezuela on maritime agreements, then the Norwegian government argued its decision to return the embassy to Colombia due to security issues in Venezuela.)

Relations between the Republic of Colombia and the Kingdom of Norway began on 6 September 1935.

== History ==
In 2015, Colombia, Norway, Germany and the United Kingdom signed a Joint Declaration to enhance collaboration on climate and forest in Colombia. In recent years, bilateral relations between the two governments have been very active due to the efforts of the respective diplomatic missions, Norwegian support for peace-building in Colombia and the Mechanism for Bilateral Political Consultations. Norway sent US$250M to Colombia in order to combat deforestation.

Norway was a guarantor in the negotiations that led to the peace agreements with the FARC-EP and is also a guarantor in the dialogues with the NLA.

== Bilateral agreements ==
Both countries have signed several bilateral agreements such as a Treaty of Trade and Navigation between the government of Colombia and the government of Norway (1938); Free Trade Agreement between the Republic of Colombia and the EFTA States (2008); Agreement between the Government of the Republic of Colombia and the Government of the Kingdom of Norway regarding work permits for dependents of diplomatic, consular, administrative and technical personnel assigned to diplomatic and consular missions (2016) and an Agreement between the Republic of Colombia and the Kingdom of Norway on visa exemption for short-term stays for holders of ordinary, diplomatic, official or service passports (2018).

== Trade ==
In Bogotá, 29 April 1938, the government of Norway and the government of Colombia signed the trade and navigation treaty, which aims to: Strengthen the ties of friendship and develop the trade and navigation relations that exist between the two parties and was approved in Bogotá, 19 July 1938.

At the time of signing the Treaty of Commerce and Navigation between Colombia and Norway, the Plenipotentiaries of the two High Contracting Parties have agreed on the following provisions which constitute an integral part of the Treaty itself. Norwegian canned fish from the Clupea family will benefit, upon importation into Colombia, from the same customs treatment and other import facilities agreed upon or to be agreed upon in the future, as canned fish from the same family imported from all other countries.

— Antonio Rocha and Carl Ferdinand Sandberg

In 2022, Norway exported $59.8M to Colombia. The products exported from Norway to Colombia included mixed mineral or chemical fertilizers ($33.5M), wood pulp lyes ($3.23M), and electric generating sets ($2.53M). Colombia exported $329M to Norway. The products exported from Colombia to Norway included coal briquettes ($202M), coffee ($64.4M), and coke ($49.6M).

== Adoption ==
Child adoption from Colombia to Norway has an extensive history. In 2020, no other countries of origin had a higher number of adoptions to Norway than Colombia. Though the number was only 13 of 46 adoptions in 2020, the number was markedly higher up to and including the mid-2000s when about 700 children were adopted to Norway annually. Among the famous adoptees are boxer Cecilia Brækhus, who was adopted in the early 1980s.

== Diplomatic missions ==
- Colombia has an embassy in Oslo.
- Norway has an embassy in Bogotá.

== See also ==
- Foreign relations of Colombia
- Foreign relations of Norway
