= Tiffany Junot =

American boxer (born 1979)

Personal information
- Born: March 30, 1979 (age 47) New Orleans, Louisiana, U.S.
- Weight: Light middleweight

Boxing career
- Stance: Orthodox

Boxing record
- Total fights: 15
- Wins: 11
- Win by KO: 6
- Losses: 3
- Draws: 1

Tiffany Junot (born March 30, 1979) is an American former professional boxer.

== Professional career ==
Junot turned professional in 2006 and compiled a record of 9–3–1 before defeating Mia St. John to win the WBC light-middleweight title.

== Professional boxing record ==
15 fights	11 wins	3 losses
By knockout	6	0
By decision	5	3
Draws	1	

No.	Result	Record	Opponent	Type	Round, time	Date	Location	Notes
15	Win	11–3–1	Lakeysha Williams	UD	6 (6)	2013-06-21	Harrah's Casino, New Orleans, Louisiana, U.S.	
14	Win	10–3–1	Mia St. John	UD	10 (10)	2012-11-10	Home Base Building, Bakersfield, California, U.S.	Won WBC light-middleweight title
13	Loss	9–3–1	Kuulei Kupihea	UD	6 (6)	2011-07-16	Neal S. Blaisdell Center, Honolulu, Hawaii, U.S.	
12	Win	9–2–1	Patricia Linton	TKO	1 (4)	2010-07-22	Houston Club, Houston, Texas, U.S.	
11	Win	8–2–1	Kita Watkins	MD	8 (8)	2010-04-29	Houston Club, Houston, Texas, U.S.	
10	Win	7–2–1	Jessica Grimes	TKO	1 (4)	2009-10-08	Hilton Americas Hotel, Houston, Texas, U.S.	
9	Draw	6–2–1	Kimberly Connor	SD	6 (6)	2009-08-06	Hilton Americas Hotel, Houston, Texas, U.S.	
8	Win	6–2	Nikita McCargo	TKO	1 (4)	2009-07-11	San Miguel Arena, Houston, Texas, U.S.	
7	Win	5–2	Kita Watkins	UD	4 (4)	2009-06-06	Coushatta Casino Resort, Kinder, Louisiana, U.S.	
6	Loss	4–2	Chika Nakamura	UD	6 (6)	2008-11-20	HP Pavilion, San Jose, California, U.S.	
5	Win	4–1	Kim Colbert	PTS	4 (4)	2008-03-14	The Factory, Franklin, Tennessee, U.S.	
4	Win	3–1	Melisenda Perez	TKO	3 (4)	2007-11-30	Castine Center, Mandeville, Louisiana, U.S.	
3	Win	2–1	Judy Garcia Tate	TKO	1 (4)	2007-11-07	Gilley's, Dallas, Texas, U.S.	
2	Loss	1–1	Dominga Olivo	UD	4 (4)	2006-11-04	Coushatta Casino Resort, Kinder, Louisiana, U.S.	
1	Win	1–0	Lauren Owens	TKO	2 (4)	2006-07-28	Belle of Baton Rouge, Baton Rouge, Louisiana, U.S.	

== See also ==
- List of female boxers

Sporting positions
World boxing titles
Preceded by Mia St. John	WBC light-middleweight champion November 10, 2012 – 2013; Vacated	Vacant Title next held by Mikaela Laurén
