= Kali Reis =

American boxer and actress (born 1986)

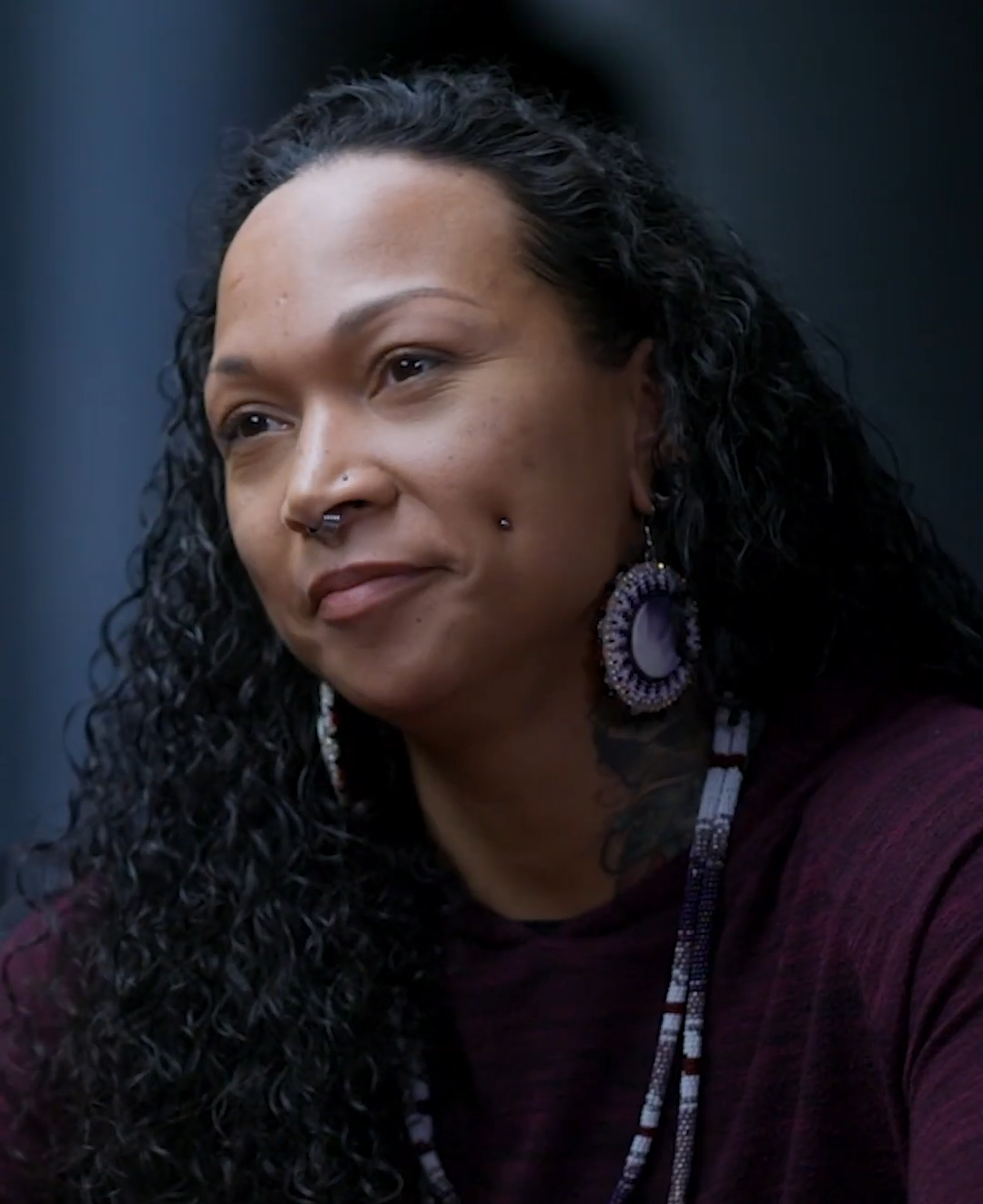
- Reis in 2024

Personal information
- Nickname: K.O. Mequinonoag
- Born: August 24, 1986 (age 40) Providence, Rhode Island, U.S.
- Height: 5 ft 8 in (173 cm)
- Weight: Light welterweight; Welterweight; Light middleweight; Middleweight

Boxing career
- Stance: Orthodox

Boxing record
- Total fights: 27
- Wins: 19
- Win by KO: 5
- Losses: 7
- Draws: 1

Kali Reis (born August 24, 1986) is an American professional boxer and actress. She is a former world champion in two weight classes, having held the WBC female middleweight title in 2016 and the WBA, WBO, and IBO female light welterweight titles between 2020 and 2022. She also challenged Cecilia Brækhus for the undisputed female welterweight title in 2018. Reis is a member of the International Women's Boxing Hall of Fame.

In 2021, Reis made her acting debut as the star of the American thriller film Catch the Fair One. For her performance as a boxer endeavoring to rescue her missing sister, she was nominated for the Independent Spirit Award for Best Female Lead. She has since starred in the mystery series True Detective: Night Country (2024), for which she received nominations for a Primetime Emmy Award, a Golden Globe Award, and a Critics Choice Award.

== Early life, family and education ==
Reis was born in Providence, Rhode Island, on August 24, 1986, the youngest of five children. She and her siblings were raised by their mother in East Providence. Her father, Frank Reis, was a musician who at one point played keyboards for Marky Mark and the Funky Bunch.

Reis has Cape Verdean heritage, and is a member of the Seaconke Wampanoag Tribe, a cultural organization for people who claim Wompanoag ancestry. She has incorporated the name Mequinonoag, given to her by her mother, which she translates as "many feathers" or "many talents", into her boxing nickname, "K.O. Mequinonoag".

Reis was an athletic child and often played rougher sports with the neighborhood boys. She participated in her junior high and high school's marching bands and color guards and competed in high school volleyball, basketball, and softball. Reis started boxing at age 14 at Manfredo's Gym in Pawtucket, Rhode Island. She was also coached at home by a local Native American boxer who was a friend of her mother.

Reis later attended school for criminology, aiming to be a corrections officer for juveniles. She also learned how to repair motorcycles at MTTI. She continued her training at Manfredos Gym and Big Six Boxing Academy in Providence.

Before going pro, Reis had a successful amateur career, securing the 2007 Rocky Marciano Championship, the 2007 NYC Golden Gloves, and the 2006 New England 154 Championship. While beginning her boxing career, she also worked in nightclub security. During this time, she sued the city after being attacked by a police officer.

== Professional boxing career ==
In 2012, Reis was involved in a serious motorcycle accident that sidelined her for the remainder of the boxing season. However, she returned in 2014 and fought for the WIBA title in November of that year. Reis gained further attention in the sport after the match. On November 12, 2014, Reis won the IBA crown defeating Teresa Perozzi in Bermuda. Reis also coaches boxing for youth and works as a trainer. In April 2016, Reis won her first major world title in New Zealand against Maricela Cornejo for the vacant WBC World Middleweight title.

HBO broadcast its first women's bout, between Cecilia Brækhus and Reis, on May 5, 2018, which Brækhus won.

Reis won a total of 19 fights during her career, 5 by knockout.

== Acting career ==
Reis became involved in the movie Catch the Fair One after filmmaker Josef Kubota Wladyka discovered Reis's advocacy for the MMIWG movement and asked if she would collaborate as a co-writer and lead actress on a film about that subject. Catch the Fair One premiered in June 2021 at the Tribeca Film Festival. The film and Reis's debut performance received critical acclaim.

Reis was cast in Jean-Stéphane Sauvaire's 2023 film Asphalt City (originally titled Black Flies, adapted from the 2008 novel of the same name by Shannon Burke), starring Sean Penn, Tye Sheridan, and Katherine Waterston.

In June 2022, Reis was announced as the co-lead of True Detective: Night Country, the fourth season of HBO's anthology crime series. Reis starred alongside Jodie Foster as a detective investigating the disappearance of eight men from an Alaskan research station and that event's possible connection to the earlier murder of a young woman, an Iñupiaq activist.

In April 2024, Reis joined Amazon MGM Studios' sci-fi thriller entitled Mercy.

== Accolades ==
For her role in Catch the Fair One, Reis won the Jury Award for Best Actress at the 2021 Newport Beach Film Festival. She was also nominated for Best Female Lead at the 37th Independent Spirit Awards. In 2024, Reis became the first Native American woman nominated for a Primetime Emmy for acting; Reis was nominated for a Primetime Emmy Award for Outstanding Supporting Actress in a Limited or Anthology Series or Movie for her work in True Detective.

In February 2022, Reis was honored for her achievements as an athlete and for mentoring local youth by being inducted into the North American Indigenous Athletic Hall of Fame. That same year, she also received the "Misty Upham Award" at the Red National International Film Festival and was honored with a key to the City of East Providence. On March 28, 2024, a panel of Rhode Island House of Representatives recognized Reis with the Community Hero Award for her advocacy and support of Murdered and Missing Indigenous Women and Girls. The award was inscribed: "She needed a hero, so she became one."

In October 2025, she was named among the inductees for the 2026 International Women's Boxing Hall of Fame class.

== Personal life ==
Reis identifies as two-spirit, and has been in relationships with both women and men. She is married to Brian Cohen, a retired professional boxer.

She is an active supporter of the Missing and Murdered Indigenous Women and Girls (MMIWG) movement.

== Disputed ancestry ==
A report from the website Tribal Alliance Against Frauds claims Reis has no Native American ancestry. The website claims to have researched five generations of her genealogy.

== Professional boxing record ==
28 fights	20 wins	7 losses
By knockout	5	0
By decision	14	7
By disqualification	1	0
Draws	1	

No.	Result	Record	Opponent	Type	Round, time	Date	Location	Notes
27	Win	19–7–1	Jessica Camara	SD	10	November 19, 2021	SNHU Arena, Manchester, New Hampshire, U.S.	Retained WBA and IBO female light welterweight titles; Won vacant WBO light welterweight title
26	Win	18–7–1	Diana Prazak	UD	10	August 20, 2021	Sycuan Casino, El Cajon, California, U.S.	Retained WBA female light welterweight title; Won vacant IBO female light welterweight title
25	Win	17–7–1	Kandi Wyatt	UD	10	November 6, 2020	Marriott Clearwater, St. Petersburg, Florida, U.S.	Won vacant WBA female light welterweight title
24	Win	16–7–1	Patricia Juarez	UD	6	August 29, 2019	Foxwoods Resort Casino, Ledyard, Connecticut, U.S.	
23	Win	15–7–1	Szilvia Szabados	TKO	6 (6) 1:30	October 18, 2018	Mayflower Hotel, Washington, DC, U.S.	
22	Win	14–7–1	Paty Ramirez	UD	8	June 30, 2018	Mohegan Sun Arena, Montville, Connecticut, U.S.	
21	Loss	13–7–1	Cecilia Brækhus	UD	10	May 5, 2018	StubHub Center, Carson, California, U.S.	For WBA, WBC, IBF, WBO, and IBO female welterweight titles
20	Win	13–6–1	Tiffany Woodard	UD	6	November 25, 2017	Mayflower Hotel, Washington, DC, US	
19	Win	12–6–1	Sydney LeBlanc	UD	6	October 19, 2017	Mohegan Sun Arena, Montville, Connecticut, US	
18	Win	11–6–1	Ashleigh Curry	MD	6	May 11, 2017	Mohegan Sun Arena, Montville, Connecticut, U.S.	
17	Loss	10–6–1	Christina Hammer	UD	10	November 5, 2016	Ballhaus Forum, Munich, Germany	Lost WBC female middleweight title; For WBO female middleweight title
16	Win	10–5–1	Althea Saunders	UD	8	July 15, 2016	Twin River Event Center, Lincoln, Rhode Island, U.S.	
15	Win	9–5–1	Maricela Cornejo	SD	10	April 16, 2016	The Trusts Arena, Auckland, New Zealand	Won vacant WBC female middleweight title
14	Win	8–5–1	Victoria Cisneros	TKO	1 (10) 1:31	February 19, 2016	Twin River Event Center, Lincoln, Rhode Island, U.S.	Won vacant UBF female middleweight title
13	Loss	7–5–1	Hanna Gabriels	UD	10	October 17, 2015	Estadio Edgardo Baltodano Briceño, Liberia, Costa Rica	For WBO female light middleweight title
12	Loss	7–4–1	Christina Hammer	UD	10	May 2, 2015	Sparkassen-Arena, Jena, Germany	For WBO female middleweight title
11	Win	7–3–1	Teresa Perozzi	TKO	3 (10) 0:51	November 21, 2014	Fairmont Southampton Resort, Southampton, Bermuda	Won vacant IBA female middleweight title
10	Loss	6–3–1	Mikaela Laurén	UD	8	July 18, 2014	Pabellon Municipal, Sedaví, Spain	
9	Win	6–2–1	Marva Dash	DQ	4 (6) 1:41	March 3, 2014	Irish Cultural Center, Canton, Massachusetts, U.S.	Dash disqualified for excessive holding
8	Loss	5–2–1	Tori Nelson	UD	10	November 7, 2013	Martin's Valley Mansion, Cockeysville, Maryland, U.S.	For WIBA welterweight title
7	Win	5–1–1	Lyneisha Jefferson	PTS	4	June 29, 2012	Convention Center, Providence, Rhode Island, U.S.	
6	Win	4–1–1	Marva Dash	UD	4	March 9, 2012	Convention Center, Providence, Rhode Island, U.S.	
5	Win	3–1–1	Kate Aversa	TKO	2 (4)	December 9, 2011	Civic Center, West Warwick, Rhode Island, U.S.	
4	Draw	2–1–1	Sarah Kuhn	SD	6	October 28, 2011	Empire State Plaza Convention Center, Albany, New York, U.S.	
3	Loss	2–1	Aleksandra Magdziak Lopes	MD	6	July 9, 2010	Twin River Event Center, Lincoln, Rhode Island, U.S.	
2	Win	2–0	Aleksandra Magdziak Lopes	UD	4	March 6, 2009	Memorial Hall, Plymouth, Massachusetts, U.S.	
1	Win	1–0	Betsy Rowell	TKO	2 (4), 1:16	September 6, 2008	The Roxy, Boston, Massachusetts, U.S.	

== Filmography ==
Key
†	Denotes projects that have not yet been released

=== Film ===
Year	Title	Role	Notes
2021	Catch the Fair One	Kaylee	Also "story by"
2023	Asphalt City	Nia	
2025	Rebuilding	Mali	
2026	Mercy	Jacqueline "Jaq" Diallo	
2026	Resident Evil	Maxine	
TBA	Wind River: The Next Chapter †		Post-production

=== Television ===
Year	Title	Role	Notes
2024	True Detective: Night Country	Evangeline Navarro	Miniseries
TBA	12 12 12 †		Upcoming series

== See also ==
- List of female boxers

Sporting positions
Minor world boxing titles
Vacant Title last held by Mary Jo Sanders	IBA female middleweight champion November 21, 2014 – 2015; Vacated	Vacant
Vacant Title last held by Tori Nelson	UBF female middleweight champion February 19, 2016 – March 2016; Vacated	Vacant Title next held by Tori Nelson
Vacant Title last held by Svetlana Kulakova	IBO female light-welterweight champion August 20, 2021 – 2022; Vacated	Vacant Title next held by Chantelle Cameron
Major world boxing titles
Vacant Title last held by Tori Nelson	WBC female middleweight champion April 16, 2016 – November 5, 2016	Succeeded by Christina Hammer
Vacant Title last held by Jessica McCaskill	WBA female light-welterweight champion November 6, 2020 – 2022; Vacated	Vacant Title next held by Chantelle Cameron
Vacant Title last held by Christina Linardatou	WBO female light-welterweight champion November 19, 2021 – 2022; Vacated	Vacant Title next held by Chantelle Cameron
