= Wang Ya Nan =

Chinese boxer

Personal information
- Nickname: China Girl
- Nationality: (China) Chinese
- Born: 29 October 1984 (age 41) Liaoning, China
- Height: 1.75 m (5 ft 9 in)
- Weight: Middleweight

Boxing career
- Stance: Orthodox

Boxing record
- Total fights: 8
- Wins: 8
- Win by KO: 3
- Losses: 0
- Draws: 0
- No contests: 0

Wang Ya Nan (29 October 1984) is a Chinese former professional boxer who competed from 2006 to 2009. During her career, from which she retired an undefeated world champion, she held the WIBA middleweight title from 2007 to 2009 and the WBC female middleweight title from 2008 to 2009.

== Professional career ==
In January 2008, Wang became the first Chinese fighter to win the WBC middleweight female world title, defeating Janaya Davis by unanimous decision after 10 rounds.

On her first title defense, Wang defeated American boxer Akondaye Fountain. Wang won the bout, held on 7 November 2008 at the Sichuan Gymnasium in Chengdu, China.

Wang retired as undefeated middleweight champion after defeating Kenian Charity Mukami in a fight held in Malvern.

Wang resides in Melbourne, Australia.

== Professional boxing record ==
8 fights	8 wins	0 losses
By knockout	3	0
By decision	5	0

No.	Result	Record	Opponent	Type	Round, time	Date	Location	Notes
8	Win	8–0	(Kenya) Charity Mukami	UD	10	2009-12-20	Town Hall, Malvern, Australia	Retained WBC and WIBA female middleweight titles
7	Win	7–0	(United States) Akondaye Fountain	MD	10	2008-10-07	Sichuan Gymnasium, Chengdu, China	Retained WBC and WIBA female middleweight titles
6	Win	6–0	(United States) Veronica Rucker	UD	10	2008-09-13	Wanda Plaza, Chengdu, China	
5	Win	5–0	(China) Lili Xie	TKO	5 (6)	2008-03-29	Shanghai MCC Club, Shanghai, China	
4	Win	4–0	(United States) Janaya Davis	UD	10	2008-01-26	The Venetian Macao, Macau, China	Retained WIBA middleweight title; Won vacant WBC female middleweight title
3	Win	3–0	(United States) Laura Ramsey	UD	10	2007-07-28	Wanda Plaza, Shanghai, China	Won vacant WIBA middleweight title
2	Win	2–0	(Thailand) Nutruja Pradabmook	KO	6 (8)	2006-10-20	Shenzhen, China	
1	Win	1–0	(Netherlands) Dagmar van Alfen	TKO	10 (10)	2006-06-29	Shanghai, China	
