= University of Applied Management =

Private university in Bavaria, Germany

University of Applied Management (HAM)
- Hochschule für angewandtes Management
- Motto: Die Kompetenzhochschule – weil Können den Unterschied macht.
- Motto in English: The university of competence - because skill makes the difference.
- Established: 2004
- President: Prof. Dr. Susanne Schuller
- Students: 4.000 (2024)
- Location: Ismaning (Hauptsitz), Berlin, Düsseldorf, Frankfurt am Main, Hamburg, Köln, Mannheim, Nürnberg, Stuttgart, Treuchtlingen, Unna, Wien, Germany
- Website: http://www.fham.de/en/
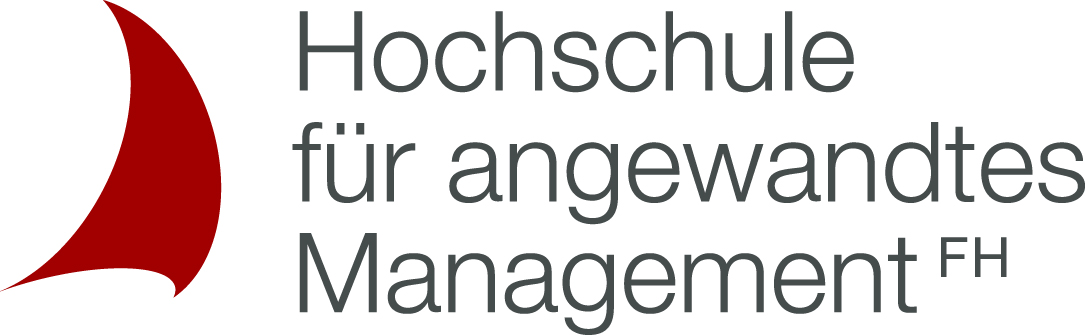

The University of Applied Management (HAM) is a private, state-recognized university of applied sciences with headquarters in Ismaning, which was founded in 2004. Further study centers are located in Berlin, Düsseldorf, Frankfurt am Main, Hamburg, Cologne, Mannheim, Nuremberg, Stuttgart, Treuchtlingen, Unna and Vienna. The university offers courses in the fields of business administration, sports management and technology and media. Until 2017, the main location was in Erding.

== History ==
The University of Applied Management was founded in 2004 as Fachhochschule für angewandtes Management in Erding and later renamed the University of Applied Management. In 2015, the university relocated some of its students to Ismaning. In 2017, it moved completely to its new headquarters in Ismaning. In 2012, HAM was institutionally accredited by the German Council of Science and Humanities, and in 2015 it received system accreditation from FIBAA. It then moved completely to its new headquarters in Ismaning in 2017. In 2012, HAM was institutionally accredited by the German Council of Science and Humanities and in 2015 it received system accreditation from FIBAA. Today, the more than 4,000 students are taught by around 60 professors and 180 lecturers.

Susanne Schuller has been the President of HAM since October 2023. At the start of the winter semester 2024/25, Benedikt Schumm was elected Vice President of HAM by the university senate. Together with Chancellor Bettina Trapp, they form the Executive Board of the university.

== Study concept ==
HAM pursues a semi-virtual study concept: part of the course takes place virtually using an online learning platform, with students acquiring knowledge with the help of multimedia tools. In addition, attendance phases are planned, which serve to attend lectures and courses at HAM and to take examinations. The teaching methods are based on the blended learning approach and are aimed at Problem-Based Learning and the acquisition of practical skills.

- Full-time study
- Part-time study
- Cooperative/part-time studies (Studium Plus)
- Dual study program (Dual Plus)

With the Dual Plus model, teaching can take place at the learning location of the cooperating company.

== Faculties and degree programs ==
HAM offers Bachelor's and Master's degree courses in the three faculties of Business Administration, Sports Management and Technology and Media. Depending on the course of study, the academic degrees Bachelor of Arts, Master of Arts, Bachelor of Science, Master of Science, Bachelor of Engineering or Master of Engineering can be achieved.

=== Field of Study: Construction & Real Estate ===
- Construction Management (B.A. Management)
- Construction Management (B.Eng. Industrial Engineering)
- Construction Management for Civil Engineers (M.Eng. Industrial Engineering)
- Real Estate Management (B.A. Management)
- Real Estate Management (M.A. Management)

=== Field of Study: Creative ===
- Creative Media (B.A.)
- Creative Media (M.A.)
- Design (B.A.)
- Event Management (B.A.)
- Film and Video Production (B.A.)
- Music Production (B.A.)

=== Field of Study: Digitalization, IT & Software ===
- Artificial Intelligence (M.Sc. Business Informatics)
- Computer Science (M.Sc.)
- Cyber Security (M.Sc. Business Informatics)
- Digital Innovation (M.Sc.)
- Game Design (B.Sc.)
- Software Design and User Experience (B.Sc.)
- Software Development (B.Sc.)
- Business Informatics (B.Sc.)

=== Field of Study: Engineering ===
- Digital Engineering (B.Eng.)
- Digital Engineering (M.Eng.)
- Digital Transformation Management (M.Eng. Industrial Engineering)
- Electrical Engineering & Building Automation (B.Eng.)
- Green Engineering (M.Eng.)
- Sustainability Management (M.Eng. Industrial Engineering)
- Industrial Engineering (B.Eng.)
- Industrial Engineering (M.Eng.)

=== Field of Study: Fashion & Beauty ===
- Beauty Studies (B.A.)
- Fashion & Beauty (M.A.)
- Fashion Studies & Luxury Brands (B.A.)
- Fashion Management & Global Brands (B.A. Management)

=== Field of Study: Management ===
- Advanced Finance and Accounting (M.A. Management)
- Digital Entrepreneurship (B.Sc.)
- Digital Transformation Management (M.A. Management)
- Healthy Work and Employer Branding (M.A. Management)
- Retail Management and E-Commerce (B.A. Management)
- Human Resource Management (M.A. Management)
- Innovative B2B Management in Wholesale and Foreign Trade (B.A. Management)
- International Management (M.A. Management)
- Management (B.A.)
- Management (M.A.)
- Sustainability Management (M.A. Management)

=== Field of Study: Media & Journalism ===
- Journalism (B.A.)
- Journalism (M.A.)
- Media Studies (B.A.)
- Media Management (B.A.)
- Media Management (M.A.)
- Media Psychology (B.A.)
- Social Media Studies (B.A.)
- Sports Journalism (B.A.)

=== Field of Study: Public Administration ===
- Public Management (B.A. Business Administration)
- Public Social Management (B.A. Business Administration)
- Social Security (B.Sc. Business Informatics)

=== Field of Study: Sports ===
- CSR and Sustainability in Sports (M.A. Sports Management)
- Digitalization in Sports (M.A. Sports Management)
- Esports Management (B.A. Sports Management)
- Football Management (B.A. Sports Management)
- Football Management (M.A. Sports Management)
- Outdoor Studies (B.A.)
- Sports and Performance Psychology (M.A. Sports Management)
- Sports Management (B.A.)
- Sports Management (M.A.)
- Tennis and Racket Sports (B.A. Sports Management)

=== Field of Study: Business Psychology ===
- Digital Transformation Management (M.A. Business Psychology)
- Healthy Work & Employer Branding (M.A. Business Psychology)
- Psychology of Life Environments (B.Sc.)
- Psychology of Life Environments (M.Sc.)
- Sports and Performance Psychology (M.A. Business Psychology)
- Business Psychology (B.A.)
- Business Psychology (M.A.)

== Research projects ==
Currently, several research and third-party funded projects are being conducted across the various faculties in collaboration with renowned partners:

=== Faculty of Business Administration ===
- Research Project MeQ:ino: A project focused on "Promoting the Strengthening of Digital Media Competence for Future-Oriented Media Education in Vocational Training" for the Federal Ministry of Education and Research (BMBF).
- Research Project LEKAF: A research project analyzing and promoting learning competencies. LEKAF is supported and funded by the Vodafone Foundation and Heister from the Federal Institute for Vocational Education and Training (BIBB).
- Research Project TEAMLEAD: "A Study on the Design of Leadership Roles in Middle Management from a Systems Theory Perspective – with a Focus on Team Process Management." Funded by the Federal Ministry of Education and Research (BMBF).
- Research Project Transfer Strength Method: "Designing Educational Programs to Support Transfer and Enhancing Employees' Learning and Transfer Competencies," in collaboration with the Association of German Chambers of Industry and Commerce (DIHK).
- Research Project ELSA: Development of didactics for self-organized learning processes. This research is conducted in cooperation with the Federal Institute for Vocational Education and Training (BIBB).

=== Faculty of Sports Management ===
- Research Project "Four Hills Tournament Oberstdorf": A market research study on the successful use of major sports events to promote tourism in Oberstdorf, in cooperation with the Municipality of Oberstdorf.
- Research Project "Organizational and Process Development at Hannover 96": A research project focusing on organizational and process development, including social media strategies, for the Bundesliga football club Hannover 96.

=== Faculty of Technology and Media ===
- Research Project "AI Coach": The AI Coach Work-Health aims to support organizations in implementing health-promoting measures. Using an app-based AI solution, managers and employees are empowered to sustainably create healthy working conditions and set feasible, personalized health-oriented goals. This initiative aims to improve work quality, maintain employee health, and promote well-being in the workplace.

== Accreditation ==
The university has been institutionally accredited by the German Council of Science and Humanities. All Bachelor's and Master's degree programs at the University of Applied Management have been accredited by FIBAA as part of the implementation of the Bologna Process under the ECTS system.

== Sports promotion / Scholarships ==
In cooperation with the Bavarian Olympic Training Center, the university awards annual scholarships to competitive athletes. To date, the university has supported the following athletes with a scholarship:

- Andreas Wellinger (ski jumping / SC Ruhpolding)
- Viktoria Rebensburg (alpine skiing / SC Kreuth)
- Paul Eckert (ski cross / WSV Samerberg)
- Anna Gerhardt (soccer / FC Bayern Munich)
- Florian Wilmsmann (ski cross / TSV Hartpenning)
- Jakob Lange (Nordic combined / WSV Kiefersfelden)
- Sara Däbritz (soccer / FC Bayern Munich)
- Moritz Geisreiter (speed skating / DEC Inzell)
- Selina Jörg (Snowboard / SC Sonthofen)
- Johannes Ludwig (Luge / BSR Rennsteig Oberhof)
- Roxanne Dufter (speed skating / DEC Inzell)
- Franziska Hildebrand (biathlon / WSV Clausthal-Zellerfeld)
- Tina Lutz (sailing / Chiemsee Yacht Club)
- Viktoria Haidn-Tschalova (Archery / German Archery Federation)
