= Ivana Habazin =

Croatian boxer (born 1989)

Personal information
- Nationality: Croatian
- Born: 22 October 1989 (age 36) Zagreb, Yugoslavia (now Croatia)
- Height: 5 ft 8 in (173 cm)
- Weight: Welterweight; Light middleweight; Middleweight

Boxing career
- Reach: 66 1/2 in (169 cm)
- Stance: Orthodox

Boxing record
- Total fights: 30
- Wins: 24
- Win by KO: 7
- Losses: 6

Ivana Habazin (born 22 October 1989) is a Croatian professional boxer. She was a four-time world champion, having held the IBF female welterweight title in 2014, WBC female welterweight title and WBA Interim female welterweight title in 2024. She also held the IBO female middleweight title in 2018.

== Early life ==
Habazin was born on 22 October 1989 in Zlatar, Croatia. A Catholic, Habazin wanted to enter a monastery at the age of 14, but later decided to pursue a career in boxing, which she began training at the age of 19. She was inspired to begin boxing by the movie Rocky.

She holds master's degrees in Theology, Criminal Justice and International Relations and Diplomacy.

== Professional career ==
Habazin made her professional debut in June 2010, against Edit Szigeti, whom she defeated by a first round TKO. Habazin kept her undefeated record over her next nine fights, achieving stoppage victories against Emeke Halas, Ava Kovacs and twice against Daniela Bickei, as well as decision victories against Edita Karabeg twice, Marija Vuković and twice against Suzana Radovanović.

Her 10 fight winning streak earned her the chance to fight Eva Bajic for the vacant IBF female welterweight title. Bajic won the fight by unanimous decision.

Habazin rebounded from this loss with two decision victories, defeating Teodora Georgieva and Borislava Goranova. She once against challenged for the IBF female welterweight title against Sabrina Giuliani in March 2014. Habazin won the fight by split decision. She afterwards scheduled to defend her IBF title against Cecilia Brækhus, who was the defending WBO, WBA and WBC champion. Brækhus won the fight by unanimous decision.

She once again rebounded from this loss with two victories, a decision against Galina Gyumliyska and a first round stoppage of Dajana Bukva. These two victories gave Habazin the chance to fight Mikaela Laurén for the WBC female light middleweight title. Laurén won the fight by a third round TKO.

Following this loss, Habazin would win her next two fights, winning unanimous decisions against Valentina Stanković and Sanja Ristić. She was scheduled to fight Elene Sikmashvili for the vacant IBO female middleweight title. Habazin defeated Sikmashvili by a fifth round TKO. Habazin was scheduled to defend her IBO title six months later against Gifty Amanua Ankrah. Habazin won the fight by unanimous decision. Three months later, Habazin fought a rematch with Eva Bajic, winning the fight by unanimous decision.

Habazin was scheduled to defend her title for the second time against Claressa Shields in January 2020. This was the third time this fight was scheduled, with Shields pulling out the first time due to a knee injury, while the fight was cancelled the second time as Shields' brother Timothy Johnson assaulted Habazin's coach James Ali Bashir. Shields won the fight by unanimous decision.

She was scheduled to fight Layla McCarter in March 2021. Habazin was later rescheduled to fight Nana Chakhvashvili in April 2021 for the World Boxing Council Middle East Welterweight title. She won the fight by a second round TKO. Ms. McCarter also fought on the card.

She claimed the vacant WBC 147-pound (welterweight) title by winning against Hungarian Kinga Magyar on 20 April 2024 in Dražen Petrović Basketball Centre in Zagreb.

=== IBF and WBC welterweight championship unification ===
Habazin faced Natasha Jonas for the unified IBF and WBC welterweight titles in Liverpool, England on 14 December 2024. She lost the fight by unanimous decision.

== Professional boxing record ==
29 fights	23 wins	6 losses
By knockout	7	1
By decision	16	5

No.	Result	Record	Opponent	Type	Round, time	Date	Location	Notes
29	Loss	23–6	Natasha Jonas	UD	10	14 Dec 2024	Exhibition Centre, Liverpool, England	Lost WBC welterweight title; for IBF welterweight title
28	Win	23-5	Kinga Magyar	UD	10	20 Apr 2024	KC Dražen Petrović, Zagreb, Croatia	Won vacant WBC welterweight title
27	Win	22–5	Timea Belik	UD	6	29 Sep 2023	Hard Rock Live, Hollywood, Florida, U.S.	
26	Loss	21–5	Terri Harper	UD	10	27 May 2023	Manchester Arena, Manchester, England	For WBA light-middleweight title
25	Win	21–4	Diana Prazak	UD	10	22 Oct 2022	Sportska Dvorana, Zabok, Croatia	Won vacant WBC Silver welterweight title
24	Loss	20–4	Claressa Shields	UD	10	10 Jan 2020	Ocean Casino Resort, Atlantic City, New Jersey, U.S.	For vacant WBC and WBO light-middleweight titles
23	Win	20–3	Eva Bajic	UD	10	8 Dec 2018	KC Dražen Petrović, Zagreb, Croatia	
22	Win	19–3	Gifty Amanua Ankrah	UD	10	8 Sep 2018	Arena Zagreb, Zagreb, Croatia	Retained IBO middleweight title
21	Win	18–3	Elene Sikmashvili	TKO	5 (10)	16 Mar 2018	Hallmann Dome, Vienna, Austria	Won vacant IBO middleweight title
20	Win	17–3	Sanja Ristić	UD	6	29 Oct 2017	Dom Mladih, Sarajevo, Bosnia and Herzegovina	
19	Win	16–3	Valentina Stanković	UD	6	5 Jul 2017	Nightclub Ribnica, Kakanj, Bosnia and Herzegovina	
18	Loss	15–3	Mikaela Laurén	TKO	3 (10)	23 Apr 2016	Stockholm, Sweden	For WBC light-middleweight title
17	Win	15–2	Dajana Bukva	TKO	1 (6)	5 Dec 2015	Bogumil Toni Arena, Samobor, Croatia	
16	Win	14–2	Galina Gyumliyska	PTS	6	29 Nov 2014	Bogumil Toni Arena, Samobor, Croatia	
15	Loss	13–2	Cecilia Brækhus	UD	10	13 Sep 2014	TAP 1, Copenhagen, Denmark	Lost IBF welterweight title; For WBA, WBC, and WBO welterweight titles
14	Win	13–1	Sabrina Giuliani	SD	10	22 Mar 2014	Hall Omnisport de La Préalle, Herstal, Belgium	Won vacant IBF welterweight title
13	Win	12–1	Borislava Goranova	PTS	6	30 Nov 2013	Božić Gym, Zagreb, Croatia	
12	Win	11–1	Teodora Georgieva	UD	8	9 Jun 2013	Zadar, Croatia	
11	Loss	10–1	Eva Bajic	UD	10	22 Mar 2013	Universal Hall, Berlin, Germany	For vacant IBF welterweight title
10	Win	10–0	Suzana Radovanović	PTS	8	22 Sep 2012	Hala sportover Nikšić, Nikšić, Montenegro	
9	Win	9–0	Edita Karabeg	PTS	8	24 Feb 2012	Opatija, Croatia	
8	Win	8–0	Ava Kovacs	TKO	5 (8)	20 Nov 2011	BK Sensei, Čapljina, Bosnia and Herzegovina	
7	Win	7–0	Emeke Halas	TKO	4 (8)	1 Oct 2011	Samobor, Croatia	
6	Win	6–0	Daniela Bickei	TKO	6 (6)	7 Jul 2011	Fitness Centre Omnia, Zadar, Croatia	
5	Win	5–0	Edita Karabeg	PTS	6	28 May 2011	Velika Gorica, Croatia	
4	Win	4–0	Marija Vuković	UD	6	20 Feb 2011	OFC Gym, Opatija, Croatia	
3	Win	3–0	Suzana Radovanović	PTS	4	4 Dec 2010	Samobor, Croatia	
2	Win	2–0	Daniela Bickei	TKO	3 (4)	22 Sep 2010	Fitness Centre Omnia, Zadar, Croatia	
1	Win	1–0	Edit Szigeti	TKO	1 (4)	25 Jun 2010	Velika Gorica, Croatia	

== See also ==
- List of female boxers

Sporting positions
Regional boxing titles
Vacant Title last held by Lolita Muzeya	WBC Silver welterweight champion 22 October 2022 – 20 April 2024; Won world title	Vacant
Minor world boxing titles
New title	IBO middleweight champion 16 March 2018 – 2018; Vacated	Vacant
Major world boxing titles
Vacant Title last held by Eva Bajic	IBF welterweight champion 22 March 2014 – 13 September 2014	Succeeded by Cecilia Brækhus
Preceded by Jessica McCaskill	WBC welterweight champion 20 April 2024 – 14 December 2024	Succeeded by Natasha Jonas
