= Healthy user bias =

Type of research bias

The healthy user bias or healthy worker bias is a bias that can damage the validity of epidemiologic studies testing the efficacy of particular therapies or interventions.

Specifically, it is a sampling bias or selection bias. For example, in trials or experimental studies, the subjects that take up an intervention (e.g by enrolling in a clinical trial), are not representative of the general population in terms of their health status. Subjects who volunteer for a study can be expected, on average, to be healthier than people who don't volunteer, as they are concerned for their health and are predisposed to follow medical advice, both factors that would aid one's health.

In occupational epidemiological studies, being healthy or engaging in health-promoting activities may lead to different employment opportunities or longer employment histories. Where recruitment into such studies is conditioned on length of employment (e.g. excluding temporary workers or those who leave employment before a certain period of time has elapsed), it may also be conditioned inadvertently on health. For example, someone in ill health is unlikely to have a job as manual laborer. As a result, studies of manual laborers are studies of people who are currently healthy enough to engage in manual labor, rather than studies of people who would do manual labor if they were healthy enough. In a cohort study of French uranium enrichment workers, a strong healthy worker effect was observed when their mortality was compared to that of the general population: nuclear workers are typically recruited subject to health screening and are undergo regular health checks throughout their employment, leading to selection of healthy workers.
