= Mikaela Laurén =

Swedish boxer and swimmer (born 1976)

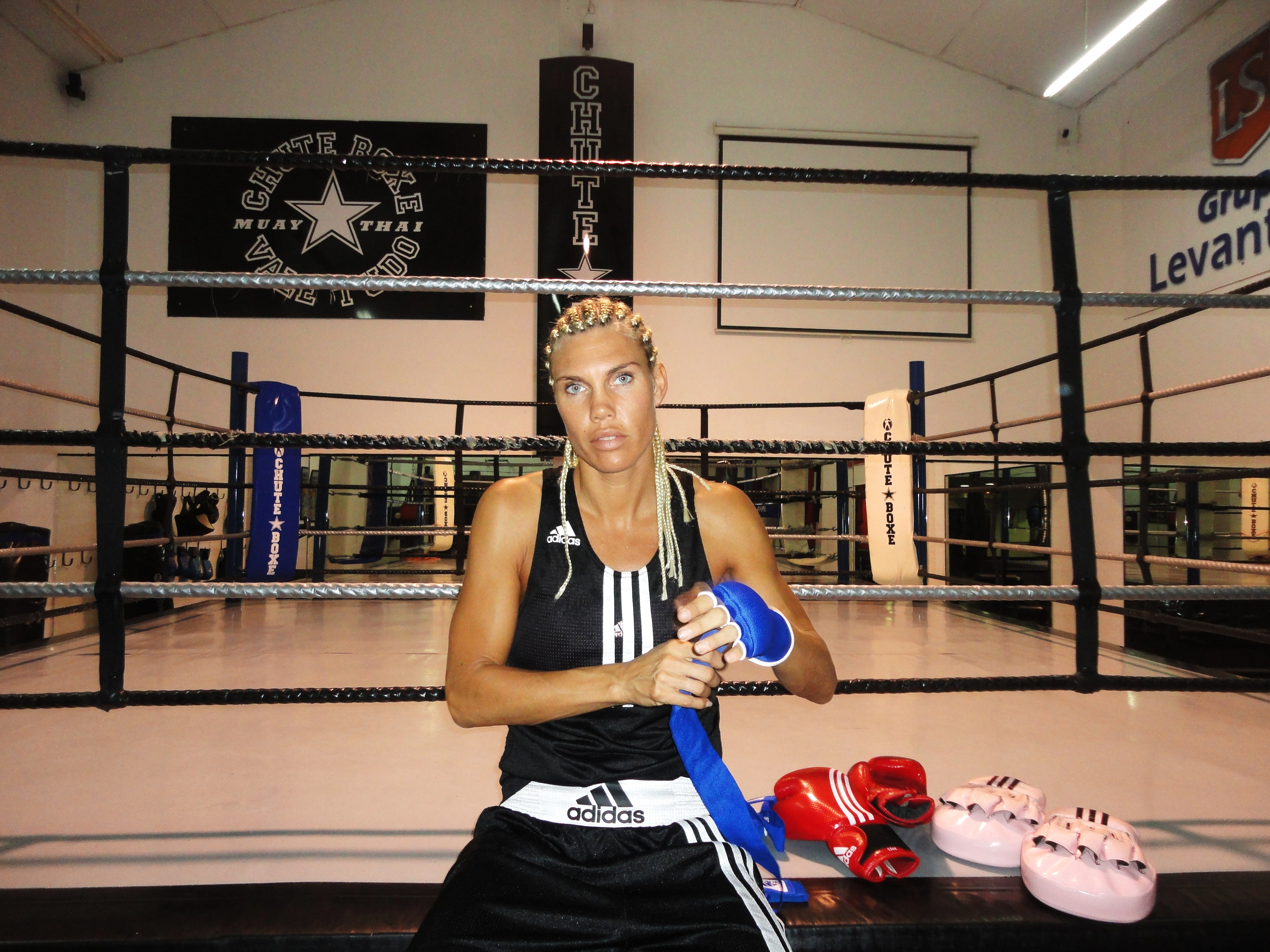
- Laurén in 2010

Personal information
- Nationality: Swedish
- Born: 20 January 1976 (age 50) Stockholm, Sweden
- Height: 1.78 m (5 ft 10 in)
- Weight: Welterweight; Light-middleweight; Middleweight

Boxing career
- Stance: Orthodox

Boxing record
- Total fights: 43
- Wins: 33
- Win by KO: 14
- Losses: 9
- Draws: 1

Mikaela Laurén (born 20 January 1976) is a Swedish professional boxer and former national team swimmer. In boxing she held the WBC female light middleweight title from 2014 to 2016, and has challenged once for the undisputed female welterweight championship in 2017.

== Early and personal life ==
Laurén grew up in Enskede in southern Stockholm. She started swimming at the age of three and trained with the Stockholm police sports association. At the age of eighteen she moved to the United States, there she was recruited by the University of Nebraska–Lincoln. During her stay in the country she decided to tattoo the text "Destiny" on her lower back, at the same time that her best friend, swimmer Therese Alshammar, tattooed the text "Diva" at the same spot on her body. In 2001 Laurén returned to Sweden and continued her preparation for the 2004 Summer Olympics in Athens.

In March 2005, she was arrested for having anabolic steroids at her home. She was sentenced to one year and two months imprisonment for doping and weapon crimes. She was released in May 2006 after serving her sentence. During her imprisonment she studied nutrition and training at the Mittuniversity in Östersund. She also continued physio and led the training for the inmates at the prison. After her release she educated herself to become a personal trainer, she decided to return to Santa Monica in the United States to start her work to become a professional boxer.

Laurén competed in the celebrity dance show Let's Dance 2017 which is broadcast on TV4. She was the first dancer to be eliminated.

== Professional boxing career ==
Laurén signed a contract with New Sweden in May 2007 and made her professional debut in April 2009. On 8 November 2014 she won the WBC female super-welterweight title against American boxer Aleksandra Magdaziak.

She challenged undisputed female welterweight champion Cecilia Brækhus at Oslofjord Convention Center in Stokke, Norway, on 21 October 2017, losing by stoppage in the sixth round.

Laurén retired from professional boxing in 2019 but made a comeback in 2024. She challenged WBF female welterweight champion Michaela Kotaskova at Hotel InterContinental in Vienna, Austria, on 30 November 2024, losing by unanimous decision.

== Professional boxing record ==
43 fights	33 wins	9 losses
By knockout	14	2
By decision	19	7
Draws	1	

No.	Result	Record	Opponent	Type	Round, time	Date	Location	Notes
43	Loss	33–9–1	(Lithuania) Vaida Masiokaite	UD	6	9 May 2026	Eriksdalshallen, Stockholm, Sweden	
42	Loss	33–8–1	(Czech Republic) Michaela Kotaskova	UD	10	30 Nov 2024	Hotel InterContinental, Vienna, Austria	For the WBF female welterweight title
41	Draw	33–7–1	(United Kingdom) Jordan Barker Porter	SD	6	12 Oct 2024	Hotel Jacy'z, Gothenburg, Sweden	
40	Loss	33–7	(Czech Republic) Ester Konecna	UD	8	29 Jun 2024	Anfiteatro Oscar Espla, Benidorm, Spain	
39	Win	33–6	(Georgia (country)) Mariami Nutsubidze	RTD	1 (8)	24 Feb 2024	Royal Arena, Copenhagen, Denmark	
38	Win	32–6	(Mexico) Paty Ramirez	UD	6	11 Dec 2019	Svenska Mässan, Gothenburg, Sweden	
37	Loss	31–6	(Canada) Marie-Eve Dicaire	UD	10	13 Apr 2019	Montreal Casino, Montreal, Quebec, Canada	For IBF female light-middleweight title
36	Win	31–5	(Hungary) Eva Bajic	UD	6	9 Jun 2018	Kooperativet Lindholmen, Gothenburg, Sweden	
35	Win	30–5	(Germany) Verena Kaiser	MD	10	21 Apr 2018	Gärdehov, Sundsvall, Sweden	Won vacant IBO female light-middleweight title
34	Loss	29–5	(Norway) Cecilia Brækhus	TKO	6 (10), 1:39	21 Oct 2017	Oslofjord Convention Center, Stokke, Norway	For WBA, WBC, IBF, WBO, and IBO female welterweight titles
33	Win	29–4	(United States) Kita Watkins	UD	6	22 Apr 2017	Sporthallen, Sundsvall, Sweden	
32	Win	28–4	(Hungary) Szilvia Szabados	TKO	6 (6), 0:17	9 Dec 2016	Rosvalla Eventcenter, Nyköping, Sweden	
31	Loss	27–4	(Sweden) Klara Svensson	UD	10	10 Sep 2016	Hovet, Stockholm, Sweden	For vacant WBC interim female welterweight title
30	Win	27–3	(Croatia) Ivana Habazin	TKO	3 (10), 1:55	23 Apr 2016	Stockholm, Sweden	Retained WBC female light-middleweight title
29	Win	26–3	(Germany) Jennifer Retzke	TKO	5 (10), 1:31	28 Nov 2015	ABB Arena, Västerås, Sweden	Retained WBC female light-middleweight title
28	Win	25–3	(United States) Victoria Cisneros	TKO	4 (10)	6 Jun 2015	Eriksdalshallen, Stockholm, Sweden	Retained WBC female light-middleweight title; Won vacant UBF female light-middleweight title
27	Win	24–3	(Colombia) Celia Rosa Sierra	TKO	3 (6), 1:13	21 Mar 2015	Jean Pierre Complex, Port of Spain, Trinidad and Tobago	
26	Win	23–3	(United States) Aleksandra Magdziak Lopes	MD	10	8 Nov 2014	ABB Arena, Västerås, Sweden	Won vacant WBC female light-middleweight title
25	Win	22–3	(United States) Kali Reis	UD	8	18 Jul 2014	Polideportivo Municipal, Sedaví, Spain	
24	Win	21–3	(South Africa) Esther Matshiya	UD	8	27 Mar 2014	Göta Källare, Stockholm, Sweden	Won UBO and WIBF interim light-middleweight titles
23	Win	20–3	(Hungary) Rita Kenessey	TKO	2 (6), 1:37	14 Dec 2013	Göta Källare, Stockholm, Sweden	
22	Loss	19–3	(Germany) Christina Hammer	UD	10	13 Jul 2013	EnergieVerbund Arena, Dresden, Germany	For WBO and WBF female middleweight titles
21	Win	19–2	(Romania) Floarea Lihet	RTD	6 (8)	14 Jun 2013	Polideportivo Municipal, Sedaví, Spain	
20	Win	18–2	(Russia) Angel McKenzie	UD	6	10 Nov 2012	Göta Källare, Stockholm, Sweden	
19	Win	17–2	(Hungary) Eva Bajic	TKO	5 (12), 0:51	5 Oct 2012	Alvik Gamla Tryckeriet, Stockholm, Sweden	Won vacant UBO female light-middleweight title
18	Win	16–2	(Thailand) Pimnipa Tanawatpipat	KO	2 (6)	15 Jun 2012	World Trade Centre, Dubai, United Arab Emirates	
17	Win	15–2	(Puerto Rico) Cindy Serrano	UD	6	27 Apr 2012	Cloetta Center, Linköping, Sweden	
16	Loss	14–2	(Spain) Loli Muñoz	UD	8	30 Mar 2012	Polideportivo Municipal, Gandia, Spain	
15	Win	14–1	(Italy) Chantal Ughi	KO	1 (6), 1:50	2 Feb 2012	The Aviation Club, Dubai, United Arab Emirates	
14	Win	13–1	(Dominican Republic) Luisa Maria Romero	TKO	2 (6), 2:00	18 Nov 2011	Hotel Jaragua, Santo Domingo, Dominican Republic	
13	Win	12–1	(Argentina) Eliana Maria Lencina	UD	8	21 Oct 2011	Recinto de La Pérgola, Castellón de la Plana, Spain	
12	Win	11–1	(Hungary) Eva Bajic	TKO	2 (6), 1:49	3 Sep 2011	Karlstad CCC, Karlstad, Sweden	
11	Win	10–1	(Russia) Angel McKenzie	UD	10	23 Jul 2011	Polideportivo Municipal, Chiva, Spain	
10	Win	9–1	(Russia) Viktoria Demidova	UD	6	28 May 2011	Mellringehallen, Örebro, Sweden	
9	Win	8–1	(United States) Rachel Clark	MD	6	15 Apr 2011	Recinto de La Pérgola, Castellón de la Plana, Spain	
8	Win	7–1	(Serbia) Daniela Bickei	TKO	1 (6)	17 Dec 2010	Polideportivo Municipal, Sedaví, Spain	
7	Loss	6–1	(Norway) Cecilia Brækhus	TKO	7 (10), 0:40	30 Oct 2010	StadtHalle, Rostock, Germany	For WBA, WBC, and WBO female welterweight titles
6	Win	6–0	(United States) Jill Emery	UD	6	24 Sep 2010	Sundsta idrottshus, Karlstad, Sweden	
5	Win	5–0	(Bulgaria) Borislava Goranova	UD	6	10 Sep 2010	Baltiska hallen, Malmö, Sweden	
4	Win	4–0	(Latvia) Natālija Dolgova	UD	6	20 Feb 2010	Pontushallen, Luleå, Sweden	
3	Win	3–0	(Latvia) Natālija Dolgova	UD	6	3 Oct 2009	Haninge Boxningsklubb, Stockholm, Sweden	
2	Win	2–0	(Russia) Marina Morozova	KO	3 (4)	6 Jun 2009	Sporthall, Tidaholm, Sweden	
1	Win	1–0	(Germany) Sandra Kirchbaum	PTS	4	4 Apr 2009	Messehalle, Burghausen, Germany	

Sporting positions
Minor world boxing titles
New title	UBO female light-middleweight champion 5 October 2012 – present	Incumbent
Vacant Title last held by Tori Nelson	UBF female light-middleweight champion 6 June 2015 – present	Incumbent
Major world boxing titles
New title	WIBA light-middleweight champion Interim title 27 March 2014 – November 2014; Vacated	Title discontinued
Vacant Title last held by Tiffany Junot	WBC female light-middleweight champion 8 November 2014 – September 2016; Vacated	Vacant Title next held by Ewa Piątkowska
