= List of WBC female world champions =

The following is a list of WBC female world champions certificated by the World Boxing Council (WBC).

Stand: October 11, 2026.

Current champion
Most consecutive title defenses

^{r} – Champion relinquished title.
^{s} – Champion stripped of title.

On July 30, 2011, Ana María Torres won the first female Diamond Belt by defeating Jackie Nava at Bantamweight.

On October 13, 2012, Ava Knight won the Diamond Belt at Flyweight, decisioning Mariana Juárez. On May 11, 2013, she defended this title against Linda Soto from Mexico by unanimous decision.

On January 14, 2017, Amanda Serrano beat Yazmín Rivas to become the Diamond Champion at Super bantamweight.

On September 30, 2017, Jessica Chávez beat Esmeralda Moreno to win the vacant WBC female Diamond flyweight title.

On September 14, 2018, German Raja Amasheh won the vacant WBC Diamond super flyweight title against Peruvian Linda Laura Lecca.

On April 13, 2019, Claressa Shields won the vacant Diamond middleweight title via UD against Christina Hammer.

On October 30, 2021, Jackie Nava won the vacant Diamond super bantamweight title via UD against Mariana Juárez.

== Atomweight ==
No.	Name	Duration of reign	Defences
1	(Thailand) Chirawadee Srisuk	Aug 31, 2007 — Aug 11, 2008	0
2	(Japan) Momo Koseki	Aug 11, 2008 — 2018^{r}	17
3	(Czech Republic) Fabiana Bytyqi	Sep 22, 2018 — Jan 13, 2024	4
4	(Germany) Tina Rupprecht	Jan 13, 2024 — Oct 2025^{r}	2
5	(Mexico) Camila Zamorano	Oct 15, 2025 — present	2

== Strawweight ==
No.	Name	Duration of reign	Defences
1	(Japan) Nanako Kikuchi	Nov 7, 2005 — May 27, 2007	1
2	(United States) Carina Moreno	May 17, 2007 — Oct 31, 2009	3
3	(Mexico) Anabel Ortiz	Oct 31, 2009 — May 8, 2011	1
4	(Japan) Naoko Fujioka	May 8, 2011 — 2013^{r}	2
5	(Japan) Mari Ando	Dec 14, 2013 — May 17, 2014	0
6	(Japan) Yuko Kuroki	May 17, 2014 — Dec 17, 2017	5
7	(Japan) Momo Koseki	Dec 17, 2017 — 2018^{r}	0
8	(Germany) Tina Rupprecht – Interim champion promoted	Jun 16, 2018 — Mar 25, 2023	5
9	(United States) Seniesa Estrada	Mar 25, 2023 — Oct 23, 2024^{r}	2
10	(Costa Rica) Yokasta Valle	Nov 1, 2024 — present	0

== Light flyweight ==
No.	Name	Duration of reign	Defences
1	(North Korea) Eun Soon Choi	Jun 28, 2005 — 2006^{s}	0
2	(Thailand) Siriporn Thaweesuk	Apr 3, 2007 — 2008^{r}	3
3	(Japan) Naomi Togashi - Interim champion promoted	May 2, 2009 — Jun 23, 2012	6
4	(Mexico) Esmeralda Moreno	Jun 23, 2012 — 2015^{s}	1
5	(Mexico) Ibeth Zamora Silva	Mar 3, 2013 — Apr 22, 2017	8
6	(Mexico) Esmeralda Moreno (2)	Apr 22, 2017 — Sep 22, 2018	1
7	(Mexico) Yesenia Gómez	Sep 22, 2018 - July 29, 2022	3
8	(Canada) Kim Clavel	Jul 29, 2022 — Jan 13, 2023	0
8	(Mexico) Jessica Nery Plata	Jan 13, 2023 — 2024^{v}	1
9	(Mexico) Lourdes Juárez	Nov 29, 2024 — present	2

== Flyweight ==
No.	Name	Duration of reign	Defences
1	(Italy) Stefania Bianchini	Aug 7, 2005 — Mar 29, 2008	4
2	(Italy) Simona Galassi	Mar 29, 2008 — Mar 11, 2011	4
3	(Mexico) Mariana Juárez	Mar 11, 2011 — Oct 13, 2012^{s}	7
4	(Hungary) Renáta Szebelédi	Oct 27, 2012 — May 19, 2013	0
5	(Japan) Go Shindo	May 19, 2013 — Dec 6, 2014	2
6	(Mexico) Arely Muciño	Dec 6, 2014 — Sep 19, 2015	0
7	(Mexico) Yessica Chávez	Sep 19, 2015 — 2018^{r}	6
8	(Mexico) Ibeth Zamora Silva	May 26, 2018 — June 19, 2021	2
9	(United States) Marlen Esparza	Jun 19, 2021 — Apr 26, 2024^{s}	4
10	(Argentina) Gabriela Celeste Alaniz	Apr 27, 2024 — Nov 2, 2024	0
10	(United States) Gabriela Fundora	Nov 2, 2024 — present	3

== Super flyweight ==
No.	Name	Duration of reign	Defences
1	(North Korea) Ryu Myung-ok	Jun 28, 2005 — 2006^{r}	1
2	(Mexico) Ana María Torres	Oct 7, 2006 — Oct 19, 2007	1
3	(North Korea) Ryu Myung-ok (2)	Oct 19, 2007 — 2008^{r}	1
4	(Mexico) Ana María Torres (2) - Interim champion promoted	Aug 30, 2008 — May 17, 2012^{r}	11
5	(Mexico) Zulina Muñoz	Nov 24, 2012 — May 13, 2017	10
6	(Mexico) Guadalupe Martínez Guzmán	May 13, 2017 — Dec 12, 2020	4
6	(Mexico) Lourdes Juárez	Dec 12, 2020 — Oct 1, 2022	3
7	(Mexico) Asley González	Oct 1, 2022 — 2025^{r}	2
7	(United States) Adelaida Ruiz	Nov 29, 2025 — present	0

== Bantamweight ==
No.	Name	Duration of reign	Defences
1	(North Korea) Kwang Ok Kim	Jun 28, 2005 — Jun 7, 2006^{r}	2
2	(Denmark) Anita Christensen	Oct 14, 2006 — 2007^{r}	0
3	(Mexico) Susana Vázquez	Jun 1, 2007 — 2008^{s}	0
4	(Denmark) Anita Christensen (2) - Interim champion promoted	Sep 14, 2007 — Jun 21, 2008	1
5	(Bulgaria) Galina Ivanova	Jun 21, 2008 — Oct 5, 2009	2
6	(Thailand) Usanakorn Thawilsuhannawang	Oct 5, 2009 — Jul 13, 2012	2
7	(Australia) Susie Ramadan	Jul 13, 2012 — Oct 25, 2014	0
8	(Mexico) Yazmín Rivas	Jun 28, 2014 — Jan 30, 2016	4
9	(Zambia) Catherine Phiri	Jan 30, 2016 — Apr 1, 2017	1
10	(Mexico) Mariana Juárez	Apr 1, 2017 — Oct 31, 2020	9
11	(Mexico) Yulihan Luna	Oct 31, 2020 — Sep 9, 2023	2
12	(Denmark) Dina Thorslund	Sep 9, 2023 — Jun 6, 2025^{r}	3
13	(Australia) Cherneka Johnson	Jul 11, 2025 – present	1

== Super bantamweight ==
No.	Name	Duration of reign	Defences
1	(Mexico) Jackie Nava	May 30, 2005 — May 20, 2006	2
2	(Argentina) Alejandra Oliveras	May 20, 2006 — Dec 4, 2008	3
3	(Argentina) Marcela Acuña	Dec 4, 2008 — 2010^{r}	4
4	(Jamaica) Alicia Ashley	Jul 23, 2011 — Sep 6, 2014	3
5	(Mexico) Jackie Nava (2)	Sep 6, 2014 — 2015^{s}	2
6	(Jamaica) Alicia Ashley (2)	Oct 29, 2015 — Oct 1, 2016	0
7	(Kenya) Fatuma Zarika	Oct 1, 2016 — Nov 16, 2019	3
8	(Mexico) Yamileth Mercado	Nov 16, 2019 — 12 July 2025	8
9	(United Kingdom) Ellie Scotney	Jul 11, 2025 – May 12, 2026^{r}	0
10	(Australia) Skye Nicolson	May 27, 2026 – present	0

== Featherweight ==
No.	Name	Duration of reign	Defences
1	(Australia) Sharon Anyos	Oct 22, 2005 — 2007^{s}	1
2	(Germany) Ina Menzer	Mar 8, 2008 — Jul 3, 2010	6
3	(Canada) Jeannine Garside	Jul 3, 2010 — 2012^{s}	0
4	(Canada) Jelena Mrdjenovich	Mar 23, 2012 — Sep 14, 2012	0
5	(Puerto Rico) Melissa Hernández	Sep 14, 2012 — May 31, 2013	0
6	(Canada) Jelena Mrdjenovich (2)	May 31, 2013 — Aug 1, 2015	2
7	(Argentina) Edith Soledad Matthysse	Aug 1, 2015 — Mar 11, 2016	0
8	(Canada) Jelena Mrdjenovich (3)	Mar 11, 2016 — Feb 4, 2021^{v}	4
9	(Puerto Rico) Amanda Serrano - Interim champion promoted	Feb 4, 2021 — Dec 5, 2023^{v}	5
10	(Australia) Skye Nicolson	Apr 6, 2024 — Mar 22, 2025	2
11	(United States) Tiara Brown	Mar 22, 2025 — present	1

== Super featherweight ==
No.	Name	Duration of reign	Defences
1	(Canada) Jelena Mrdjenovich	Nov 18, 2005 — Apr 9, 2009	5
2	(Canada) Olivia Gerula	Apr 9, 2009 — Nov 27, 2010	2
3	(Sweden) Frida Wallberg	Nov 27, 2010 — Jun 14, 2013	2
4	(Australia) Diana Prazak	Jun 14, 2013 — 2015^{s}	1
5	(Finland) Eva Wahlström	Apr 25, 2015 — Feb 8, 2020	5
6	(United Kingdom) Terri Harper	Feb 8, 2020 — Nov 13, 2021	2
7	(United States) Alycia Baumgardner	Nov 13, 2021 — Sep 2025^{r}	6
8	(Canada) Caroline Veyre	Feb 10, 2026 — present	0

== Lightweight ==
No.	Name	Duration of reign	Defences
1	(Canada) Jessica Rakoczy	Jul 21, 2005 — Sep 16, 2005	0
2	(United States) Eliza Olson	Sep 16, 2005 — 2006^{s}	0
3	(United States) Ann Saccurato	Nov 4, 2006 — 2007^{r}	0
4	(Canada) Jessica Rakoczy (2)	Feb 22, 2007 — Sep 27, 2007	0
5	(United States) Ann Saccurato (2)	Sep 27, 2007 — 2008^{r}	0
6	(United States) Ann Saccurato (3)	Aug 11, 2008 — Aug 6, 2011	1
7	(Argentina) Érica Farías	Aug 6, 2011 — Apr 20, 2014	8
8	(Belgium) Delfine Persoon	Apr 20, 2014 — Jun 1, 2019	9
9	(Republic of Ireland) Katie Taylor	Jun 1, 2019 — Dec 11, 2024^{v}	7
10	(United Kingdom) Caroline Dubois	Dec 11, 2024 — present	1

== Super lightweight ==
No.	Name	Duration of reign	Defences
1	(United States) Mary Jo Sanders	Jul 30, 2005 — 2006^{s}	0
2	(France) Anne Sophie Mathis	Mar 8, 2008 — 2008^{r}	0
3	(Argentina) Mónica Acosta	Jun 19, 2009 — 2013^{s}	7
4	(Argentina) Alejandra Oliveras	Oct 11, 2013 — Nov 16, 2014	0
5	(Argentina) Érica Farías	Nov 16, 2014 — Oct 6, 2018	4
6	(United States) Jessica McCaskill	Oct 6, 2018 — Aug 2020	2
7	(United Kingdom) Chantelle Cameron	Oct 4, 2020 — Nov 25, 2023	5
8	(Republic of Ireland) Katie Taylor	Nov 25, 2023 — 17 September 2025^{r}	2
9	(United Kingdom) Sandy Ryan	Feb 21, 2026 — Jun 1, 2026^{r}	0
10	(Republic of Ireland) Katie Taylor	Sep 5, 2026 — Oct 7, 2026^{r}	0

== Welterweight ==
No.	Name	Duration of reign	Defences
1	(United States) Mary Jo Sanders	Feb 3, 2006 — 2006^{r}	0
2	(United States) Holly Holm	Mar 22, 2007 — 2008^{r}	1
3	(Norway) Cecilia Brækhus	Mar 14, 2009 — Aug 15, 2020	25
4	(United States) Jessica McCaskill	Aug 15, 2020 — 2024^{s}	4
5	(Croatia) Ivana Habazin	Apr 20, 2024 — Dec 14, 2024	0
6	(United Kingdom) Natasha Jonas	Dec 14, 2024 — Mar 7, 2025	0
7	(United Kingdom) Lauren Price	Mar 7, 2025 — present	0

== Super welterweight ==
No.	Name	Duration of reign	Defences
1	(Trinidad and Tobago) Giselle Salandy	Sep 15, 2006 — Jan 4, 2009 (died in a vehicular accident)	5
2	(United States) Christy Martin	Sep 2, 2009 — 2011^{s}	0
3	(United States) Mia St. John	Aug 14, 2012 — Nov 10, 2012	0
4	(United States) Tiffany Junot	Nov 10, 2013 — 2013^{s}	0
5	(Sweden) Mikaela Laurén	Nov 8, 2014 — 2016^{s}	3
6	(Poland) Ewa Piątkowska	Sep 17, 2016 — 2019^{s}	2
7	(United States) Claressa Shields	Jan 10, 2020 — 2021^{s}	0
8	(Sweden) Patricia Berghult	Nov 27, 2021 — Sept 3, 2022	0
9	(United Kingdom) Natasha Jonas	Sept 3, 2022 — 2023^{s}	1
10	(Slovenia) Ema Kozin	Nov 18, 2023 — Oct 4, 2025	1
11	(Norway) Cecilia Brækhus	Oct 4, 2025 — Oct 4, 2025^{r}	0
12	(United States) Mikaela Mayer	Oct 30, 2025 — present	0

== Middleweight ==
No.	Name	Duration of reign	Defences
1	(United States) Yvonne Reis	Apr 1, 2006 — 2007^{r}	0
2	(China) Wang Ya Nan	Jan 26, 2008 — 2010^{s}	2
3	(United States) Tori Nelson	Jul 29, 2011 — 2012^{r}	0
4	(United States) Kali Reis	Apr 16, 2016 — Nov 5, 2016	0
5	(Germany) Christina Hammer	Nov 5, 2016 — Apr 13, 2019	3
6	(United States) Claressa Shields	Nov 17, 2018 — 2025^{r}	6
7	(Australia) Kaye Scott	Dec 20, 2025 — present	0

== Super middleweight ==
No.	Name	Duration of reign	Defences
1	(United States) Laila Ali	Nov 11, 2006 — 2007^{s}	2
2	(Russia) Natascha Ragosina	Dec 15, 2007 — 2010^{s}	4
3	(Germany) Nikki Adler	Nov 30, 2013 — Aug 4, 2017	2
4	(United States) Claressa Shields	Aug 4, 2017 — 2018^{s}	1
5	(United States) Franchón Crews-Dezurn	Sep 13, 2018 — Jul 1, 2023	3
6	(United Kingdom) Savannah Marshall	Jul 1, 2023 — 2023^{s}	0
7	(United States) Franchón Crews-Dezurn (2)	Dec 15, 2023 — present	1

== Heavyweight ==
No.	Name	Duration of reign	Defences
1	(United States) Vonda Ward	Feb 10, 2007 — 2010^{r}	0
2	(United States) Martha Salazar	Nov 8, 2014 — Mar 18, 2016	0
3	(Mexico) Alejandra Jiménez	Mar 18, 2016 — 2019^{r}	2
4	(Costa Rica) Hanna Gabriels	Apr 17, 2021 — 2022^{r}	0
5	(Canada) Vanessa Lepage-Joanisse	Mar 7, 2024 — Jul 27, 2024	0
6	(United States) Claressa Shields	Jul 27, 2024 — present	3

== See also ==
- List of current female world boxing champions
- List of female undisputed world boxing champions
- List of WBA female world champions
- List of IBF female world champions
- List of WBO female world champions
- List of WIBO world champions
