= Cecilia Brækhus =

Norwegian boxer (born 1981)

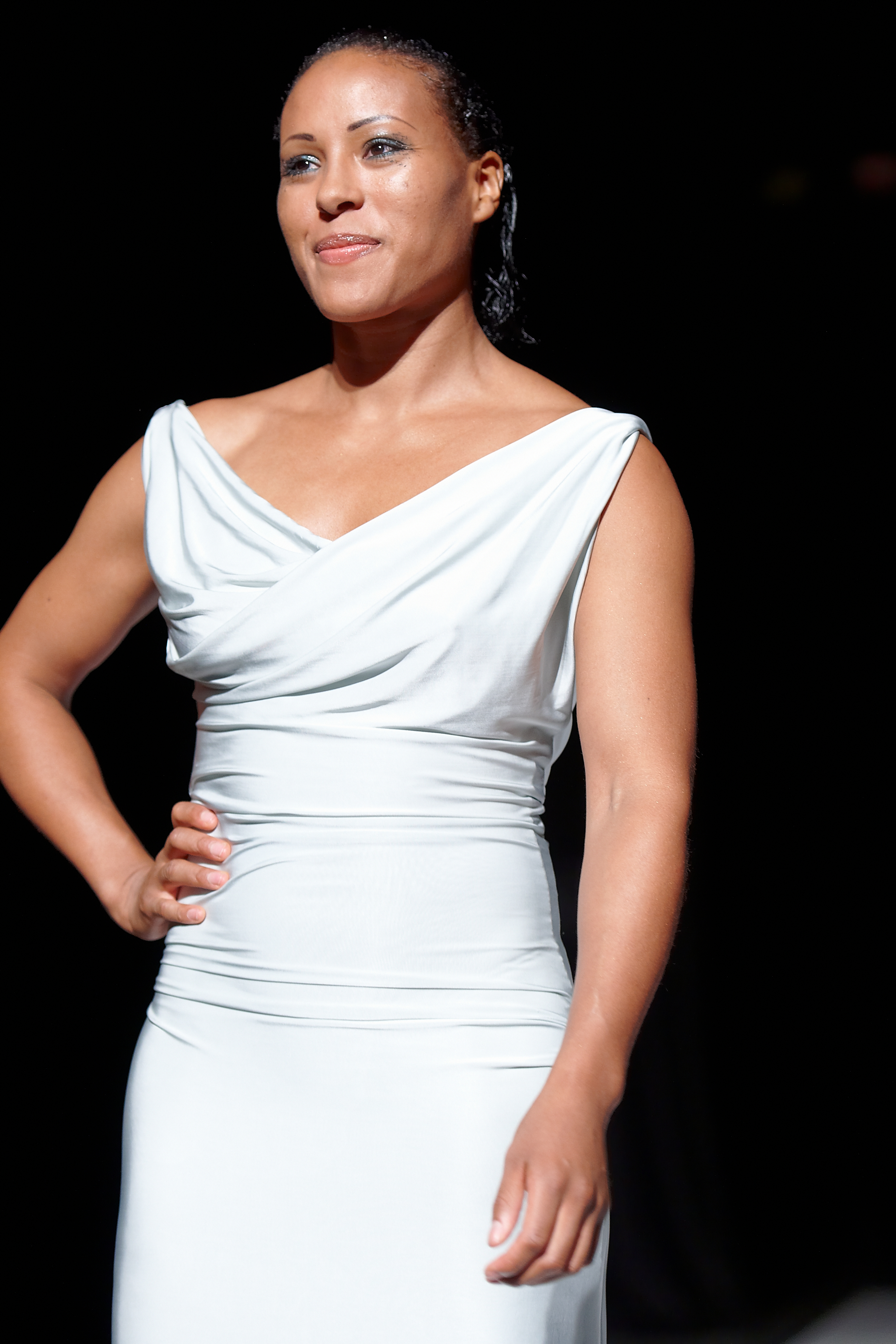
- Brækhus modelling at the Oslo Fashion Show, 2010

Personal information
- Nickname: The First Lady
- Nationality: Norwegian
- Born: 28 September 1981 (age 44) Cartagena, Colombia
- Height: 1.71 m (5 ft 7 in)
- Weight: Welterweight; Super welterweight

Boxing career
- Stance: Orthodox

Boxing record
- Total fights: 42
- Wins: 39
- Win by KO: 9
- Losses: 2
- Draws: 1
Medal record
Women's amateur boxing
Representing Norway
World Championships
Silver medal – second place	2005 Podolsk	Light-welterweight
European Championships
Gold medal – first place	2005 Tønsberg	Light-welterweight
Silver medal – second place	2004 Riccione	Light-welterweight

Cecilia Carmen Linda Brækhus (born 28 September 1981) is a Colombian-born Norwegian former professional boxer and kickboxer. She reigned as the undisputed female welterweight boxing champion from 2014 to 2020, and is the first woman in any weight class to hold the WBA, WBC, IBF and WBO titles simultaneously. Brækhus is also one of only 11 boxers in history, male or female, to hold all four major world titles simultaneously. (Note: along with Bernard Hopkins (2004–2005), Jermain Taylor (2005), Terence Crawford (2017), Oleksandr Usyk (2018–2019), Claressa Shields (2019–2020, 2021–), Katie Taylor (2019–), Jessica McCaskill (2020–), Josh Taylor (2021–), and Canelo Alvarez (2021–), Devin Haney (2022–)) She held the IBO title from 2016 to 2020. Brækhus won the WBC and WBO female super-welterweight titles in her final fight before retirement in October 2025.

In 2017, the Boxing Writers Association of America named Brækhus their inaugural Female Fighter of the Year. Guinness World Records awarded her with three recognitions in 2018: the Longest Reigning Female Boxing Champion, the Longest Reign as a Four-Belt Undisputed Boxing Champion, and the Most Bouts Undefeated by a Female World Champion Boxer. Brækhus held the WBC and WBA titles for 11 years and 154 days between 14 March 2009 and 15 August 2020.

== Early life ==
Born in Cartagena, Colombia, Brækhus was adopted as a two-year-old by Norwegian parents and raised in Sandviken, Bergen. She started kickboxing at the age of fourteen and soon began competing in amateur boxing competitions, achieving an amateur record of 75–5 before turning professional.

== Kickboxing career (semi-contact) ==
- 2003 WAKO World Champion, Semi Contact 65 kg
- 2002 WAKO Euro Champion, Semi Contact 65 kg
- 3 National Championships
- 2 H.M. The King's Trophy

== Amateur boxing career ==
Brækhus fought 80 matches and won 75 of them.

- Silver medal at the 2005 World Championships
- Gold medal at the 2005 European Championships
- Silver medal at the 2004 European Championships

== Professional boxing career ==
In November 2007, Brækhus signed a pro contract with German promoter Wilfried Sauerland, who announced his intention of making her the first Norwegian female World Champion. Her first fight was against Croatian boxer Ksenija Koprek on 20 January 2007. On 14 March 2009, she became the WBC World Champion in welterweight against Danish boxer Vinni Skovgaard and also claimed the vacant WBA female welterweight title. Brækhus successfully defended her titles on later that year on 30 May against Amy Yuratovac in Helsinki, Finland, and on 12 September 2009, against Lucia Morelli in Herning, Denmark.

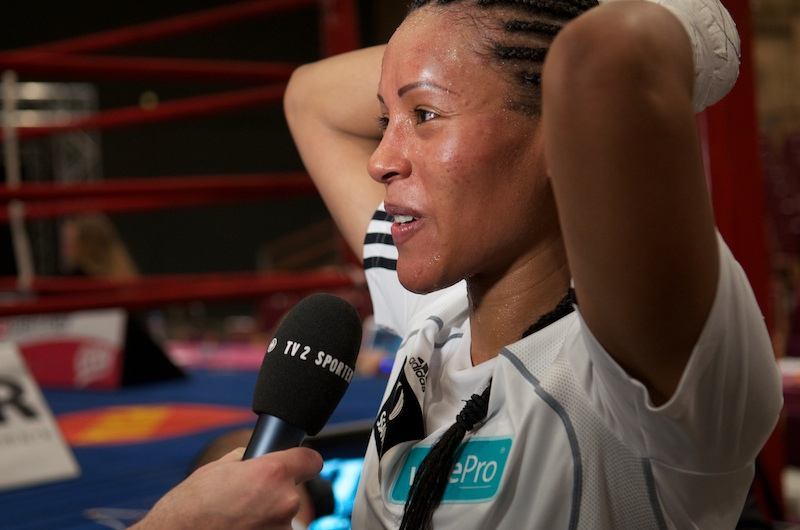
Brækhus after defending her titles against Jill Emery in 2011

Eight months later, on 15 May 2010, Brækhus successfully defended her WBA and WBC titles against American boxer Victoria Cisneros in Herning, Denmark, while winning the WBO title. In a unanimous decision, the judges declared the fight for Brækhus, having won all 10 rounds. On 30 October 2010, Brækhus successfully defended her WBA, WBC and WBO titles in Rostock, Germany against Mikaela Laurén from Sweden, while winning the World Professional Boxing Federation (WPBF) title. Brækhus won by knockout in the 7th round.

In 2010, Brækhus was voted the "Female Boxer of the Year" by German boxing magazine BoxSport. On 14 September 2014, after defeating Croatian Ivana Habazin, Brækhus became the first Norwegian and the first woman to hold all major world championship belts in her weight division (welterweight) in boxing history.

On 5 May 2018, HBO broadcast its first women's bout, between Brækhus and Kali Reis, where Brækhus successfully defended her titles.

Brækhus lost her titles to Jessica McCaskill by majority decision in a contest staged in Tulsa, Oklahoma on 15 August 2020. A rematch in Dallas, Texas on 13 March 2021 saw McCaskill take a unanimous decision win.

Brækhus claimed the vacant interim WBC female super-welterweight title with a unanimous decision win over Maricela Cornejo in Las Vegas on 10 August 2024.

Having previously announced her intention to retire, in her final fight as a professional boxer, she defeated defending WBC and WBO female super-welterweight champion, Ema Kozin, by unanimous decision at Nova Spektrum in Lillestrøm, Norway, on 4 October 2025.

== Professional boxing record ==
42 fights	39 wins	2 losses
By knockout	9	0
By decision	30	2
Draws	1	

No.	Result	Record	Opponent	Type	Round, time	Date	Location	Notes
42	Win	39–2–1	Ema Kozin	UD	10	4 Oct 2025	Nova Spektrum, Lillestrøm, Norway	Won WBC and WBO female super welterweight titles
41	Win	38–2–1	Maricela Cornejo	UD	10	10 Aug 2024	Michelob Ultra Arena, Las Vegas, U.S.	Won vacant interim WBC female super welterweight title
40	Draw	37–2–1	Terri Harper	MD	10	7 Oct 2023	Sheffield Arena, Sheffield, England	For WBA and WBO female super welterweight titles
39	Win	37–2	Marisa Joana Portillo	UD	6	17 Dec 2022	Commerce Casino, Commerce, California, U.S.	
38	Loss	36–2	Jessica McCaskill	UD	10	13 Mar 2021	American Airlines Center, Dallas, Texas, U.S.	For WBA, WBC, IBF, WBO, IBO, and inaugural The Ring female welterweight titles
37	Loss	36–1	Jessica McCaskill	MD	10	15 Aug 2020	Downtown Streets, Tulsa, Oklahoma, U.S.	Lost WBA, WBC, IBF, WBO, and IBO female welterweight titles
36	Win	36–0	Victoria Bustos	UD	10	30 Nov 2019	Casino de Salle Medecin, Monte Carlo, Monaco	Retained WBA, WBC, IBF, WBO, and IBO female welterweight titles
35	Win	35–0	Aleksandra Magdziak Lopes	UD	10	8 Dec 2018	StubHub Center, Carson, California, U.S.	Retained WBA, WBC, IBF, WBO, and IBO female welterweight titles
34	Win	34–0	Inna Sagaydakovskaya	UD	10	21 Jul 2018	Olympic Stadium, Moscow, Russia	Retained WBA, WBC, IBF, WBO, and IBO female welterweight titles
33	Win	33–0	Kali Reis	UD	10	5 May 2018	StubHub Center, Carson, California, U.S.	Retained WBA, WBC, IBF, WBO, and IBO female welterweight titles
32	Win	32–0	Mikaela Laurén	TKO	6 (10), 1:35	21 Oct 2017	Oslofjord Convention Center, Stokke, Norway	Retained WBA, WBC, IBF, WBO, and IBO female welterweight titles
31	Win	31–0	Erica Farias	UD	10	9 Jun 2017	Bergenhus Festning, Bergen, Norway	Retained WBA, WBC, IBF, WBO, and IBO female welterweight titles
30	Win	30–0	Klara Svensson	UD	10	24 Feb 2017	Spektrum, Oslo, Norway	Retained WBA, WBC, IBF, WBO, and IBO female welterweight titles
29	Win	29–0	Anne Sophie Mathis	TKO	2 (10), 1:05	1 Oct 2016	Spektrum, Oslo, Norway	Retained WBA, WBC, IBF, WBO, and IBO female welterweight titles
28	Win	28–0	Chris Namús	UD	10	27 Feb 2016	Gerry Weber Stadion, Halle, Germany	Retained WBA, WBC, IBF, and WBO female welterweight titles; Won vacant IBO female welterweight title
27	Win	27–0	Jennifer Retzke	UD	10	29 Nov 2014	Falkoner Center, Frederiksberg, Denmark	Retained WBA, WBC, IBF, and WBO female welterweight titles
26	Win	26–0	Ivana Habazin	UD	10	14 Sep 2014	TAP1, Copenhagen, Denmark	Retained WBA, WBC, and WBO female welterweight titles; Won IBF female welterweight title
25	Win	25–0	Jessica Balogun	UD	10	7 Jun 2014	Sport- und Kongresshalle, Schwerin, Germany	Retained WBA, WBC, and WBO female welterweight titles
24	Win	24–0	Myriam Lamare	UD	10	1 Feb 2014	Arena Nord, Frederikshavn, Denmark	Retained WBA, WBC, and WBO female welterweight titles
23	Win	23–0	Oxandia Castillo	TKO	9 (10), 1:51	7 Sep 2013	Arena Nord, Frederikshavn, Denmark	Retained WBA, WBC, and WBO female welterweight titles
22	Win	22–0	Mia St. John	TKO	3 (10), 1:38	13 Apr 2013	Arena Nord, Frederikshavn, Denmark	Retained WBA, WBC, and WBO female welterweight titles
21	Win	21–0	Anne Sophie Mathis	UD	10	22 Sep 2012	Arena Nord, Frederikshavn, Denmark	Retained WBA, WBC, and WBO female welterweight titles
20	Win	20–0	Jessica Balogun	UD	10	1 Jun 2012	MCH Kongrescenter, Herning, Denmark	Retained WBA, WBC, and WBO female welterweight titles
19	Win	19–0	Ku'ulei Kupihea	TKO	10 (10), 0:57	3 Dec 2011	Hartwall Arena, Helsinki, Finland	Retained WBA, WBC, and WBO female welterweight titles
18	Win	18–0	Chevelle Hallback	UD	10	7 May 2011	Koncerthuset, Copenhagen, Denmark	Retained WBA, WBC, and WBO female welterweight titles
17	Win	17–0	Jill Emery	UD	10	2 Apr 2011	MCH Kongrescenter, Herning, Denmark	Retained WBA, WBC, and WBO female welterweight titles
16	Win	16–0	Eva Bajic	KO	3 (10), 0:27	20 Nov 2010	MCH Kongrescenter, Herning, Denmark	Retained WBC and WBO female welterweight titles
15	Win	15–0	Mikaela Laurén	TKO	7 (10), 0:40	30 Oct 2010	StadtHalle, Rostock, Germany	Retained WBA, WBC, and WBO female welterweight titles
14	Win	14–0	Victoria Cisneros	UD	10	15 May 2010	MCH Kongrescenter, Herning, Denmark	Retained WBA and WBC female welterweight titles; Won vacant WBO female welterweight title
13	Win	13–0	Lucia Morelli	UD	10	12 Sep 2009	MCH Messecenter, Herning, Denmark	Retained WBA and WBC female welterweight titles
12	Win	12–0	Amy Yuratovac	UD	10	30 May 2009	Hartwall Arena, Helsinki, Finland	Retained WBA and WBC female welterweight titles
11	Win	11–0	Vinni Skovgaard	UD	10	14 Mar 2009	Sparkassen-Arena, Kiel, Germany	Won vacant WBA and WBC female welterweight titles
10	Win	10–0	Borislava Goranova	UD	8	25 Oct 2008	Weser-Ems Halle, Oldenburg, Germany	
9	Win	9–0	Cimberly Harris	UD	8	20 Sep 2008	Seidensticker Halle, Bielefeld, Germany	
8	Win	8–0	Nicole Woods	UD	6	21 Jun 2008	Hard Rock Live, Hollywood, Florida, US	
7	Win	7–0	Adelita Irizarry	UD	6	17 May 2008	Oberfrankenhalle, Bayreuth, Germany	
6	Win	6–0	Tatjana Dieckmann	UD	6	29 Mar 2008	Sparkassen-Arena, Kiel, Germany	
5	Win	5–0	Wanda Pena Ozuna	TKO	4 (4), 1:47	26 Jan 2008	Tempodrom, Berlin, Germany	
4	Win	4–0	Borislava Goranova	UD	6	23 Jun 2007	Stadthalle, Zwickau, Germany	
3	Win	3–0	Olga Bojare	UD	4	26 May 2007	Jako Arena, Bamberg, Germany	
2	Win	2–0	Jana Latova	KO	2 (4), 0:12	17 Feb 2007	Complexe sportif, Evere, Belgium	
1	Win	1–0	Ksenija Koprek	UD	4	20 Jan 2007	St. Jakobshalle, Basel, Switzerland	

== See also ==
- List of female boxers
- List of female kickboxers

== Notes ==
Sporting positions
Minor world boxing titles
Vacant Title last held by Jennifer Retzke	IBO female welterweight champion 27 February 2016 – 15 August 2020	Succeeded by Jessica McCaskill
Major world boxing titles
Vacant Title last held by Holly Holm	WBA female welterweight champion 14 March 2009 – 15 August 2020	Succeeded by Jessica McCaskill
Vacant Title last held by Holly Holm	WBC female welterweight champion 14 March 2009 – 15 August 2020	Succeeded by Jessica McCaskill
Vacant Title last held by Hanna Gabriel	WBO female welterweight champion 15 May 2010 – 15 August 2020	Succeeded by Jessica McCaskill
Preceded by Ivana Habazin	IBF female welterweight champion 13 September 2014 – 15 August 2020	Succeeded by Jessica McCaskill
Vacant Title last held by Holly Holm	Undisputed female welterweight champion 13 September 2014 – 15 August 2020	Succeeded by Jessica McCaskill
Awards
Inaugural recipient	BWAA Female Fighter of the Year; 2017	Next: Claressa Shields
