= List of boxing quintuple champions =

A quintuple champion in boxing refers to a boxer who has won world titles in five different categories of weight.

== Recognition ==
=== Major sanctioning bodies ===
These "Big 4" sanctioning bodies are considered "major" enough to award championships. They are arranged in order of foundation:

- World Boxing Association (WBA) - founded in 1921
- World Boxing Council (WBC) - founded in 1963
- International Boxing Federation (IBF) - founded in 1983
- World Boxing Organization (WBO) - founded in 1988

==== The Ring ====
The Ring, boxing's most respected magazine, has awarded world championships in professional boxing within each weight class from its foundation in 1922 until the 1990s, and again since 2001. The Ring champions were at one point held the linear reign to the throne, the man who beat the man. The lineal champion is also known as the true champion of the division. The Ring stopped giving belts to world champions in the 1990s but began again in 2002.

In 2002, The Ring attempted to clear up the confusion regarding world champions by creating a championship policy. It echoed many critics' arguments that the sanctioning bodies in charge of boxing championships had undermined the sport by pitting undeserving contenders against undeserving "champions", and forcing the boxing public to see mismatches for so-called "world championships". The Ring attempted to clear up the confusion regarding world champions by creating a championship policy that is "intended to reward fighters who, by satisfying rigid criteria, can justify a claim as the true and only world champion in a given weight class." The Ring claims to be more authoritative and open than the sanctioning bodies' rankings, with a page devoted to full explanations for ranking changes. A fighter pays no sanctioning fees to defend or fight for the title at stake, contrary to practices of the sanctioning bodies. Furthermore, a fighter cannot be stripped of the title unless he loses, decides to move to a different weight division, or retires.

There are currently only two ways that a boxer can win The Ring's title: defeat the reigning champion; or win a box-off between the magazine's number-one and number-two rated contenders (or, sometimes, number-one and number-three rated). A vacant Ring championship is filled when the number-one contender in a weight-division battles the number-two contender or the number-three contender (in cases where The Ring determines that the number-two and number-three contenders are close in abilities and records).

In May 2012, citing the number of vacancies in various weight classes as primary motivation, The Ring unveiled a new championship policy. Under the new policy, The Ring title can be awarded when the No. 1 and No. 2 fighters face one another or when the Nos. 1 and 2 contenders choose not to fight one another and either of them fights No. 3, No. 4 or No. 5, the winner may be awarded The Ring belt. In addition, there are now six ways for a fighter to lose his title: lose a fight in his championship weight class; move to another weight class; not schedule a fight in any weight class for 18 months; not schedule a fight in his championship weight class for 18 months, even if fighting at another weight class; not scheduling a fight with a top 5 contender in any weight class for two years; or retiring.

Many media outlets and members are extremely critical of the new championship policy and state that if this new policy is followed The Ring title will lose the credibility it once held.

==== Lineal ====
The Transnational Boxing Rankings Board (TBRB) hands out the official version of the lineal championship. TBRB awards vacant championships when the two top-ranked fighters in any division meet and currently recognizes legitimate world champions or "true champions" each weight classes. The Board was formed to continue where The Ring "left off" in the aftermath of its purchase by Golden Boy Promotions in 2007 and the following dismissal of Nigel Collins. After the new editors announced a controversial new championship policy in May 2012, three prominent members of the Ring Advisory Panel resigned. This three members (Springs Toledo, Cliff Rold and Tim Starks) became the founding members of the Transnational Boxing Rankings Board, which was formed over the summer of 2012 with the assistance of Stewart Howe of England.

Since 2012, lineal champions are predetermined by the Transnational Boxing Rankings Board, which promotes the concept of a singular world champion per weight class. Lineal champions are listed on Cyber Boxing Zone website which list lineal champions of the Queensberry Era to date.

=== Minor sanctioning bodies ===
The International Boxing Organization (IBO) is sometimes included in the list of major boxing organizations. Besides the IBO, there are other sanctioning bodies. They are: World Professional Boxing Federation (WPBF), International Boxing Association (IBA), National Boxing Association (NBA).

Note:

- The International Boxing Association (IBA) is not to be confused with the International Boxing Association (AIBA), a French acronym for Association Internationale de Boxe Amateur, which sanctions amateur matches.
- The National Boxing Association (NBA) was established in 1984 and is not to be confused with the original National Boxing Association that was established in 1921 and changed its name to World Boxing Association (WBA) in 1962.

== List of men's quintuple champions ==
The following is a list of quintuple champions who have held titles from one or more of the "Big Four" organizations (WBA, WBC, IBF, WBO) and The Ring.

Inducted into the International Boxing Hall of Fame
World Titles from The Ring

No.	Name	Titles	Date	Opponent	Result
1	Thomas Hearns	**WBA** Welterweight	Aug 2, 1980	Pipino Cuevas	TKO 2/15
1	Thomas Hearns	**WBC** Light middleweight	Dec 3, 1982	Wilfred Benítez	TKO 2/15
1	Thomas Hearns	**The Ring** Light middleweight	Dec 3, 1982	Wilfred Benítez	TKO 2/15
1	Thomas Hearns	**WBC** Light heavyweight	Mar 7, 1987	Dennis Andries	TKO 10/12
1	Thomas Hearns	**WBC** Middleweight	Oct 29, 1987	Juan Domingo Roldán	KO 4/12
1	Thomas Hearns	**WBO** Super middleweight	**Nov 4, 1988**	James Kinchen	MD 12/12
1	Thomas Hearns	**WBA** Light heavyweight	Mar 6, 1991	Virgil Hill	UD 12/12
2	Sugar Ray Leonard	**WBC** Welterweight	Nov 30, 1979	Wilfred Benítez	TKO 15/15
2	Sugar Ray Leonard	**The Ring** Welterweight	Nov 30, 1979	Wilfred Benítez	TKO 15/15
2	Sugar Ray Leonard	**WBC** Welterweight – (**2**)	Nov 25, 1980	Roberto Durán	TKO 8/15
2	Sugar Ray Leonard	**The Ring** Welterweight – (**2**)	Nov 25, 1980	Roberto Durán	TKO 8/15
2	Sugar Ray Leonard	**WBA** Light middleweight	Jun 25, 1981	Ayub Kalule	TKO 9/15
2	Sugar Ray Leonard	**The Ring** Light middleweight	Jun 25, 1981	Ayub Kalule	TKO 9/15
2	Sugar Ray Leonard	**WBA** Welterweight	Sep 16, 1981	Thomas Hearns	TKO 14/15
2	Sugar Ray Leonard	**WBC** Middleweight	Apr 6, 1987	Marvin Hagler	SD 12/12
2	Sugar Ray Leonard	**The Ring** Middleweight	Apr 6, 1987	Marvin Hagler	SD 12/12
2	Sugar Ray Leonard	**WBC** Super middleweight	**Nov 7, 1988**	Don Lalonde	TKO 9/12
2	Sugar Ray Leonard	**WBC** Light heavyweight	**Nov 7, 1988**	Don Lalonde	TKO 9/12
3	Oscar De La Hoya	**WBO** Super featherweight	Mar 5, 1994	Jimmy Bredahl	TKO 10/12
3	Oscar De La Hoya	**WBO** Lightweight	Feb 18, 1995	John-John Molina	UD 12/12
3	Oscar De La Hoya	**IBF** Lightweight	May 6, 1995	Rafael Ruelas	TKO 2/12
3	Oscar De La Hoya	**WBC** Light welterweight	Jun 7, 1996	Julio César Chávez	TKO 4/12
3	Oscar De La Hoya	**WBC** Welterweight	Apr 12, 1997	Pernell Whitaker	UD 12/12
3	Oscar De La Hoya	**WBC** Welterweight – (**2**)	Mar 21, 2000	**No. 1 contender promoted**	
3	Oscar De La Hoya	**WBC** Light middleweight	**Jun 23, 2001**	Javier Castillejo	UD 12/12
3	Oscar De La Hoya	**WBA** (Unified) Light middleweight	Sep 14, 2002	Fernando Vargas	TKO 11/12
3	Oscar De La Hoya	**The Ring** Light middleweight	Sep 14, 2002	Fernando Vargas	TKO 11/12
3	Oscar De La Hoya	**WBC** Light middleweight – (**2**)	May 6, 2006	Ricardo Mayorga	TKO 6/12
4	Floyd Mayweather Jr.	**WBC** Super featherweight	Oct 3, 1998	Genaro Hernández	RTD 8/12
4	Floyd Mayweather Jr.	**WBC** Lightweight	Apr 20, 2002	José Luis Castillo	UD 12/12
4	Floyd Mayweather Jr.	**The Ring** Lightweight	Apr 20, 2002	José Luis Castillo	UD 12/12
4	Floyd Mayweather Jr.	**WBC** Light welterweight	Jun 25, 2005	Arturo Gatti	TKO 6/12
4	Floyd Mayweather Jr.	**IBF** Welterweight	Apr 8, 2006	Zab Judah	UD 12/12
4	Floyd Mayweather Jr.	**WBC** Welterweight	Nov 4, 2006	Carlos Baldomir	UD 12/12
4	Floyd Mayweather Jr.	**The Ring** Welterweight	Nov 4, 2006	Carlos Baldomir	UD 12/12
4	Floyd Mayweather Jr.	**WBC** Light middleweight	**May 5, 2007**	Oscar De La Hoya	SD 12/12
4	Floyd Mayweather Jr.	**WBC** Welterweight – (**2**)	Sep 17, 2011	Victor Ortiz	KO 4/12
4	Floyd Mayweather Jr.	**WBA** (Super) Light middleweight	May 5, 2012	Miguel Cotto	UD 12/12
4	Floyd Mayweather Jr.	**The Ring** Welterweight – (**2**)	May 4, 2013	Robert Guerrero	UD 12/12
4	Floyd Mayweather Jr.	**WBC** Light middleweight – (**2**)	Sep 14, 2013	Canelo Álvarez	UD 12/12
4	Floyd Mayweather Jr.	**The Ring** Light middleweight	Sep 14, 2013	Canelo Álvarez	UD 12/12
4	Floyd Mayweather Jr.	**WBA** (Unified) Welterweight	May 3, 2014	Marcos Maidana	MD 12/12
4	Floyd Mayweather Jr.	**WBO** Welterweight	May 2, 2015	Manny Pacquiao	UD 12/12
5	Manny Pacquiao	**WBC** Flyweight	Dec 4, 1998	Chatchai Sasakul	KO 8/12
5	Manny Pacquiao	**IBF** Super bantamweight	Jun 23, 2001	Lehlo Ledwaba	TKO 6/12
5	Manny Pacquiao	**The Ring** Featherweight	Nov 15, 2003	Marco Antonio Barrera	TKO 11/12
5	Manny Pacquiao	**WBC** Super featherweight	Mar 15, 2008	Juan Manuel Márquez	SD 12/12
5	Manny Pacquiao	**The Ring** Super featherweight	Mar 15, 2008	Juan Manuel Márquez	SD 12/12
5	Manny Pacquiao	**WBC** Lightweight	**Jun 28, 2008**	David Díaz	TKO 9/12
6	Terence Crawford	**WBO** Lightweight	Mar 1, 2014	Ricky Burns	UD 12/12
6	Terence Crawford	**The Ring** Lightweight	Nov 29, 2014	Ray Beltrán	UD 12/12
6	Terence Crawford	**WBO** Light welterweight	Apr 18, 2015	Thomas Dulorme	TKO 6/12
6	Terence Crawford	**WBC** Light welterweight	Jul 23, 2016	Viktor Postol	UD 12/12
6	Terence Crawford	**The Ring** Light welterweight	Jul 23, 2016	Viktor Postol	UD 12/12
6	Terence Crawford	**IBF** Light welterweight	Aug 19, 2017	Julius Indongo	KO 3/12
6	Terence Crawford	**WBA** (Super) Light welterweight	Aug 19, 2017	Julius Indongo	KO 3/12
6	Terence Crawford	**WBO** Welterweight	Jun 9, 2018	Jeff Horn	TKO 9/12
6	Terence Crawford	**WBA** (Super) Welterweight	Jul 29, 2023	Errol Spence Jr.	TKO 9/12
6	Terence Crawford	**WBC** Welterweight	Jul 29, 2023	Errol Spence Jr.	TKO 9/12
6	Terence Crawford	**IBF** Welterweight	Jul 29, 2023	Errol Spence Jr.	TKO 9/12
6	Terence Crawford	**The Ring** Welterweight	Jul 29, 2023	Errol Spence Jr.	TKO 9/12
6	Terence Crawford	**WBA** Light middleweight	Aug 3, 2024	Israil Madrimov	UD 12/12
6	Terence Crawford	**WBA** (Super) Super middleweight	**Sep 13, 2025**	Canelo Álvarez	UD 12/12
6	Terence Crawford	**WBC** Super middleweight	**Sep 13, 2025**	Canelo Álvarez	UD 12/12
6	Terence Crawford	**IBF** Super middleweight	**Sep 13, 2025**	Canelo Álvarez	UD 12/12
6	Terence Crawford	**WBO** Super middleweight	**Sep 13, 2025**	Canelo Álvarez	UD 12/12
6	Terence Crawford	**The Ring** Super middleweight	**Sep 13, 2025**	Canelo Álvarez	UD 12/12

=== Note ===
- Dates in bold format signify the date when they won their 5th division title.

== List of women's quintuple champion ==
The following is a list of women’s quintuple champions who have held titles from one or more of the "Big Four" organizations (WBA, WBC, IBF, WBO) and The Ring.

World Titles from The Ring

No.	Name	Titles	Date	Opponent	Result
1	Amanda Serrano	**IBF** Super featherweight	Sep 10, 2011	Kimberly Connor	TKO 2/10
1	Amanda Serrano	**WBO** Lightweight	Aug 15, 2014	Maria Elena Maderna	KO 6/10
1	Amanda Serrano	**WBO** Featherweight	Feb 17, 2016	Olivia Gerula	TKO 1/10
1	Amanda Serrano	**WBO** Super bantamweight	Oct 18, 2016	Alexandra Lazar	TKO 5/10
1	Amanda Serrano	**WBO** Bantamweight	**Apr 22, 2017**	Dahiana Santana	TKO 8/10
1	Amanda Serrano	**WBO** Featherweight – (**2**)	Sep 13, 2019	Heather Hardy	UD 10/10
1	Amanda Serrano	**WBC** Featherweight	Feb 4, 2021	**Interim promoted**	
1	Amanda Serrano	**IBF** Featherweight	Sep 24, 2022	Sarah Mahfoud	UD 10/10
1	Amanda Serrano	**The Ring** Featherweight (126)	Sep 24, 2022	Sarah Mahfoud	UD 10/10
1	Amanda Serrano	**WBA** Featherweight	Feb 4, 2023	Erika Cruz	UD 10/10
2	Naoko Fujioka	**WBC** Mini flyweight	May 8, 2011	Anabel Ortiz	RTD 8/10
2	Naoko Fujioka	**WBA** Super flyweight	Nov 13, 2013	Naoko Yamaguchi	UD 10/10
2	Naoko Fujioka	**WBO** Bantamweight	Oct 19, 2015	Hee Jung Yuh	UD 10/10
2	Naoko Fujioka	**WBA** Flyweight	Mar 13, 2017	Isabel Millan	TKO 10/10
2	Naoko Fujioka	**WBO** Light flyweight	**Dec 1, 2017**	Yokasta Valle	UD 10/10
3	Claressa Shields	**IBF** Super middleweight	Aug 4, 2017	Nikki Adler	TKO 5/10
3	Claressa Shields	**WBC** Super middleweight	Aug 4, 2017	Nikki Adler	TKO 5/10
3	Claressa Shields	**IBF** Middleweight	Jun 22, 2018	Hanna Gabriel	UD 10/10
3	Claressa Shields	**WBA** Middleweight	Jun 22, 2018	Hanna Gabriel	UD 10/10
3	Claressa Shields	**WBC** Middleweight	Nov 17, 2018	Hannah Rankin	UD 10/10
3	Claressa Shields	**WBO** Middleweight	Apr 13, 2019	Christina Hammer	UD 10/10
3	Claressa Shields	**The Ring** Middleweight	Apr 13, 2019	Christina Hammer	UD 10/10
3	Claressa Shields	**WBC** Light middleweight	Jan 10, 2020	Ivana Habazin	UD 10/10
3	Claressa Shields	**WBO** Light middleweight	Jan 10, 2020	Ivana Habazin	UD 10/10
3	Claressa Shields	**IBF** Light middleweight	Mar 5, 2021	Marie-Eve Dicaire	UD 10/10
3	Claressa Shields	**WBA** (Super) Light middleweight	Mar 5, 2021	Marie-Eve Dicaire	UD 10/10
3	Claressa Shields	**The Ring** Light middleweight	Mar 5, 2021	Marie-Eve Dicaire	UD 10/10
3	Claressa Shields	**WBO** Middleweight – (**2**)	Oct 15, 2022	Savannah Marshall	UD 10/10
3	Claressa Shields	**WBO** Light heavyweight	**Jul 27, 2024**	Vanessa Lepage-Joanisse	TKO 2/10
3	Claressa Shields	**WBC** Heavyweight	**Jul 27, 2024**	Vanessa Lepage-Joanisse	TKO 2/10
3	Claressa Shields	**WBA** Heavyweight	Feb 2, 2025	Danielle Perkins	UD 10/10
3	Claressa Shields	**IBF** Heavyweight	Feb 2, 2025	Danielle Perkins	UD 10/10
3	Claressa Shields	**WBO** Heavyweight	Feb 2, 2025	Danielle Perkins	UD 10/10
3	Claressa Shields	**WBA** Middleweight – (**2**)	Aug 16, 2026	Kaye Scott	TKO 6/10
3	Claressa Shields	**WBC** Middleweight – (**2**)	Aug 16, 2026	Kaye Scott	TKO 6/10

=== Note ===
- Dates in bold format signify the date when they won their 5th division title.
- Interim titles are not included unless they get promoted to the official champion.

== Champions in greater than five weight classes ==
Several fighters have won major world titles in more than five weight divisions:

- Six divisions are called Sextuple champions (see the List of boxing sextuple champions);
- Seven divisions are called Septuple champions (see the List of boxing septuple champions; and
- Eight divisions are called Octuple champions (see the List of boxing octuple champions).

== See also ==
- List of current world boxing champions
- List of boxing triple champions
- List of boxing quadruple champions
- List of boxing sextuple champions
- List of boxing septuple champions
- Octuple champion
- List of WBA world champions
- List of WBC world champions
- List of IBF world champions
- List of WBO world champions
- List of The Ring world champions
