= Terrell Groggins =

American photojournalist and filmmaker

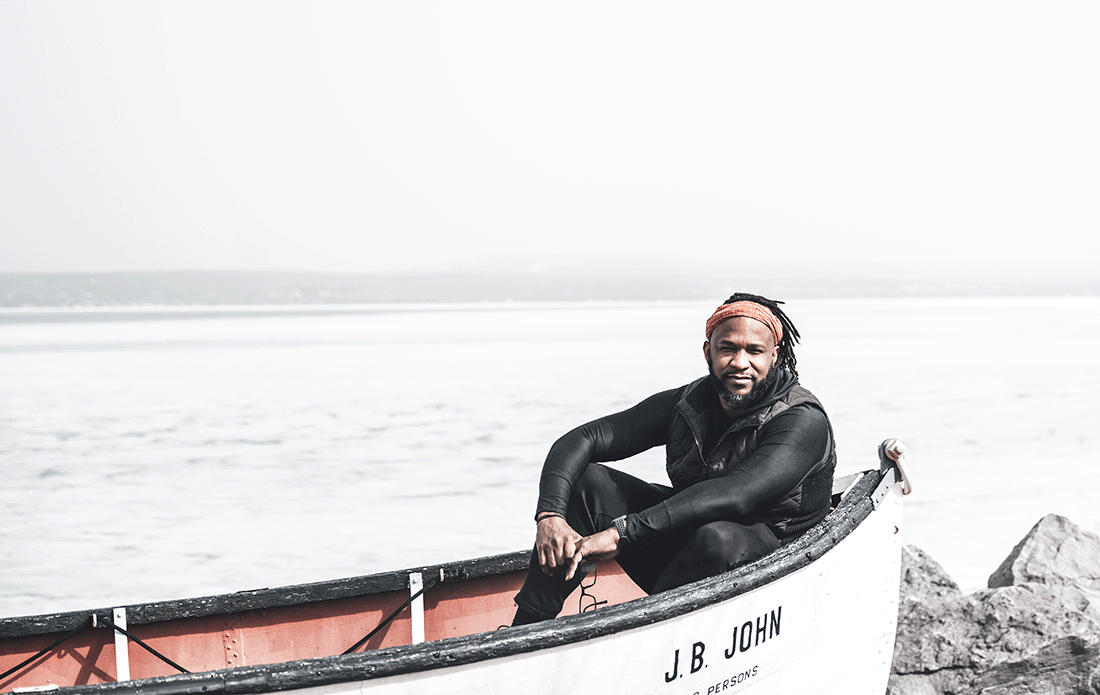
- Groggins in 2024
- Born: Detroit, Michigan, U.S.
- Occupation: Photojournalist
- Website: www.myartmyrules.com

Terrell Groggins is an American photojournalist from Detroit, Michigan. He is best known for his black-and-white sports photo of boxer Claressa Shields, which won several awards including first place in the Press/Sports category of the International Photography Awards and third prize in the Sports Category of the World Press Photo Contest. The photo was selected by The Guardian as one of "50 photographs that reshaped sport". His work is held in the permanent collection of the University of Arizona Center for Creative Photography.

== Career ==
His photo, Shields Strikes Back, was taken during the 2018 fight between Claressa Shields and Hanna Gabriels at the Detroit Masonic Temple. Groggins explained that the photograph—taken from the judges' side of the ring—was the result of a dispute with a staff photographer the day before the match. To avoid further conflict, Groggins moved to the opposite side of the arena where he captured Shields rising from the canvas. A piece in The Guardian listed the picture as one of the "50 photographs that reshaped sport".

In 2018, a portrait of Shields was selected as National Geographic Your Shot Photo of the Day (September 8, 2018), and the Shields Strikes Back image was one of 70 photographs chosen for Your Shot's Best Photos of 2018.

Groggins' work is held in the permanent collection of the University of Arizona Center for Creative Photography.

== Awards ==
- 2019 – World Press Photo Contest, Sports category, Third Prize (Shields Strikes Back)
- 2019 – Istanbul Photo Awards, Single Sports, 2nd Prize (Shields Strikes Back)
- 2019 – International Photography Awards (IPA), Professional Editorial Press/Sports, 1st Place
- 2020 – Smithsonian Magazine Photo Contest, American Experience Award
- 2024 – World Sports Photography Awards, Boxing category (Alycia Baumgardner vs Christina Linardatou 2)

== Exhibitions ==
=== Resilience: Stories of Women Inspiring Change (2022–2024) ===
Groggins was featured in Resilience: Stories of Women Inspiring Change, a traveling exhibition organized by the World Press Photo Foundation in collaboration with the Kingdom of the Netherlands. The exhibition was curated around the theme of gender and identity in the 21st century, with a focus on female resilience and women's stories from across the world.

The exhibition showcased a curated selection of photographs by 17 photographers from 13 countries whose work had been awarded in World Press Photo contests from 2000 to 2021, including Groggins' photograph Shields Strikes Back.

The exhibition toured over 30 international venues across multiple continents beginning in 2022, including the Stavros Niarchos Foundation Cultural Center in Athens, Greece; PHOTO IS:RAEL in Tel Aviv, Israel; Atrium City Hall in The Hague, Netherlands; University of the West Indies in St. Augustine, Trinidad and Tobago; Lkham Gallery in Ulaanbaatar, Mongolia; and additional venues in Armenia, Bangladesh, Brazil, China, Egypt, France, India, Italy, Japan, Mexico, Poland, South Africa, Serbia, Switzerland, Thailand, Turkey, and Vietnam.

=== Muscle Memory: Lens on the Body (2025–2026) ===
Groggins' work Gabriels and Shields Square Up Round 1 (2018, printed 2021) is featured in the Muscle Memory: Lens on the Body exhibition at Phoenix Art Museum, co-organized by Phoenix Art Museum and the Center for Creative Photography. Curated by Emilia Mickevicius, PhD, the exhibition presents over 80 works by renowned photographers including Diane Arbus, Richard Avedon, Nan Goldin, and Robert Mapplethorpe, exploring representations of the human body in movement, self-expression, and aging. The exhibition is on view from January 24 through June 28, 2026.
