= Alicia Napoleon =

American boxer

Personal information
- Nickname: The Empress
- Nationality: American
- Born: Alicia Napoleon Espinosa; January 26, 1986 (age 40)
- Height: 5 ft 5 in (165 cm)
- Weight: Super-middleweight; Middleweight; Featherweight

Boxing career
- Reach: 68 in (173 cm)
- Stance: Orthodox

Boxing record
- Total fights: 14
- Wins: 12
- Win by KO: 7
- Losses: 2

Alicia Napoleon Espinosa is an American professional boxer who held the WBA female super-middleweight title from 3 March 2018 to 10 January 2020.

== Career ==
Napoleon Espinosa started her professional career with a bang stopping Monique Duval in the first-round of her debut fight at the Crowne Plaza Hotel, Gatineau, Quebec, Canada, on 15 August 2014.

Having put together a record of eight wins and one defeat, she won the vacant WBA female super-middleweight World title in her 10th pro-fight with a unanimous decision victory over Belgian boxer Femke Hermans on 3 March 2018, at the Barclays Center, Brooklyn, on the undercard of the Deontay Wilder vs Luis Ortiz heavyweight world championship bill.

Napoleon Espinosa successfully defended her title against Hannah Rankin on 4 August 2018, winning by unanimous decision before stopping the previously unbeaten Schemelle Baldwin in round four of her second defense on 29 August 2019.

She then attempted to became a unified World champion when she put her belt on the line against IBF female super-middleweight title holder Elin Cederroos on 10 January 2020. Sweden's Cederroos knocked down Napoleon Espinosa in the second-round and went on to win the contest at Ocean Resort Casino in Atlantic City by unanimous decision.

After more than four years out of the ring, Napoleon Espinosa returned to action in the second season of boxing's first squad-based format, Team Combat League (TCL), competing for the NYC Attitude. Fighting at featherweight, she made her first appearance at 2300 Arena, Philadelphia, on 28 March 2024, winning her contest against Isabel Lopez by unanimous decision.
