= Maricela Cornejo =

American boxer (born 1987)

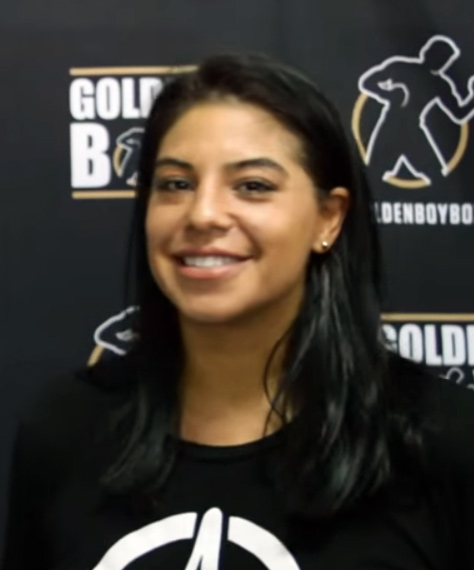
- Maricela Cornejo (July 2018)

Personal information
- Nickname: La Diva
- Born: April 16, 1987 (age 39) Prosser, Washington, United States
- Height: 5 ft 10 in (178 cm)
- Weight: Middleweight, Super-middleweight, Super-welterweight

Boxing career
- Reach: 72 in (183 cm)
- Stance: Orthodox

Boxing record
- Total fights: 28
- Wins: 19
- Win by KO: 7
- Losses: 9

Maricela Cornejo (born 16 April 1987) is an American professional boxer. She has challenged for world titles in three different weight divisions.

== Career ==
Cornejo is a former WBC female International super-middleweight champion, winning the vacant title by unanimous decision on 15 August 2015 against Latashia Burton at Mana Studios in Miami, Florida.

Eight months later, on 16 April 2016, she fought for the vacant WBC female middleweight title against Kali Reis at The Trusts Arena in Auckland, New Zealand. She lost the bout by split decision.

Cornejo faced Franchón Crews-Dezurn for the vacant WBC female super-middleweight title at Hard Rock Hotel and Casino in Las Vegas, Nevada, on 13 September 2018, losing by majority decision.

On 27 January 2019, she defeated Erin Toughill via unanimous decision at The Avalon Hollywood in Los Angeles, California.

A rematch between against Franchón Crews-Dezurn, with the WBC female super-middleweight title and the vacant WBO female super-middleweight title on the line, took place at Dignity Health Sports Park in Carson, California, on 14 September 2019. Onnce again Crews Dezurn won, this time via unanimous decision.

She challenged undisputed female middleweight champion Claressa Shields at Little Caesars Arena in Detroit, Michigan, on 3 June 2023, losing by unanimous decision.

Cornejo fought Cecilia Brækhus for the vacant WBC interim female super-welterweight title at Mandalay Bay Resort and Casino in Las Vegas, Nevada, on 10 August 2024, but lost by unanimous decision.

She faced Natasha Spence over six rounds at Yakama Legends Casino in Toppenish, Washington, on 8 August 2025, losing via unanimous decision. Cornejo took on Spence in a rematch at the same venue on 12 June 2026, with the vacant WBA International female middleweight title on the line, but again lost by unanimous decision.

== Professional boxing record ==
28 fights	19 wins	9 losses
By knockout	7	0
By decision	12	9

No.	Result	Record	Opponent	Type	Round, time	Date	Location	Notes
28	Loss	19–9	(Canada) Natasha Spence	UD	10	12 Jun 2026	Yakama Legends Casino, Toppenish, Washington, U.S.	For vacant WBA International female middleweight title
27	Loss	19–8	(Canada) Natasha Spence	UD	6	8 Aug 25	Yakama Legends Casino, Toppenish, Washington, U.S.	
26	Loss	19–7	(Norway) Cecilia Braekhus	UD	10	10 Aug 24	Mandalay Bay Resort & Casino, Las Vegas, U.S.	For WBC interim female super-welterweight title
25	Win	19–6	(Guatemala) Sara Anti Gabriel	UD	8	20 Jul 2024	(United States) Estadio Ricardo Saprissa Ayma, San Juan de Tibas, Puerto Rico	
24	Win	18–6	(Canada) Kandi Wyatt	UD	8	2 Feb 2024	(United States) Caribe Royale Orlando, Orlando, U.S.	
23	Win	17–6	(Mexico) Cynthia Lozano	KO	1 (8)	4 Nov 2023	(United States) Polideportivo de Cartago, Cartago, Puerto Rico	
22	Loss	16–6	(United States) Claressa Shields	UD	10	Jun 3, 2023	Little Caesars Arena, Detroit, Michigan, U.S.	For undisputed female middleweight title
21	Win	16–5	(Brazil) Sheila Cunha	TKO	1 (8)	25 Mar 2023	(United States) Club y Hotel Condovac La Costa, Guanacaste, Puerto Rico	
20	Win	15–5	(Brazil) Simone Aparecida da Silva	UD	8	25 Mar 2022	(United States) Camara Ganadera de San Carlos, Alajuela, Puerto Rico	
19	Win	14–5	(United States) Miranda Barber	UD	6	25 Sep 2021	(United States) Sports Arena, Pico Rivera, California, U.S.	
18	Loss	13–5	(Mexico) Alma Ibarra	UD	8	18 Mar 2021	Albergue Olimpico, Salinas, Puerto Rico	
17	Loss	13–4	(United States) Franchón Crews-Dezurn	UD	10	14 Sep 2019	(United States) Dignity Health Sports Park, Carson, California, USA	For WBC and vacant WBO female super-middleweight titles
16	Win	13–3	(United States) Erin Toughill	UD	8	27 Jan 2019	(United States) The Avalon, Hollywood, Los Angeles, California	
15	Loss	12–3	(United States) Franchón Crews-Dezurn	MD	10	13 Sep 2018	(United States) Hard Rock Hotel and Casino, Las Vegas	For vacant WBC female super-middleweight title
14	Win	12–2	(United States) Samantha Pill	KO	3 (6) 0:41	13 Jul 2018	(United States) The Novo at L.A. Live, Los Angeles	
13	Win	11–2	(Mexico) Claudia Ramirez	TKO	3 (6) 0:45	19 May 2018	Poliforum, Playa del Carmen, Quintana Roo, Mexico	
12	Win	10–2	(United States) Lisa Noel Garland	TKO	4 (6) 1:09	9 Mar 2018	(United States) The Hangar, Costa Mesa, California, USA	
11	Win	9–2	(Mexico) Irais Hernandez	SD	6	16 Nov 2017	Poliforum Benito Juarez, Cancun, Quintana Roo, Mexico	
10	Win	8–2	(Mexico) Vanessa Rodriquez	UD	6	12 Aug 2017	Arena Oasis, Cancun, Quintana Roo, Mexico	
9	Win	7–2	(United States) Sydney LeBlanc	UD	6	9 Apr 2017	(United States) The Novo at L.A. Live, Los Angeles, California, USA	
8	Win	6–2	(Mexico) Martha Patricia Lara	UD	6	17 Dec 2016	Gran Oasis Arena, Cancun, Quintana Roo, Mexico	
7	Win	5–2	(United States) Eliza Olson	UD	6	7 Oct 2016	(United States) Belasco Theater, Los Angeles, California, USA	
6	Lose	4–2	(United States) Kali Reis	SD	10	16 Apr 2016	The Trusts Arena, Auckland, New Zealand	For vacant WBC female middleweight title
5	Win	4–1	(United States) Latashia Burton	UD	10	15 Aug 2015	(United States) Mana Studios, Miami, Florida, USA	Won vacant WBC International female super-middleweight title
4	Win	3–1	(United States) Conswella Lucas	TKO	1 (4) 1:04	25 Jul 2015	(United States) Holiday Inn, Fayetteville, North Carolina, USA	
3	Lose	2–1	(United States) Tiffany Ward	UD	4	20 Sep 2013	(United States) Silver Reef Casino, Ferndale, Washington, USA	
2	Win	2–0	(United States) Terri Lowe	TKO	3 (4)	17 Nov 2012	(United States) Four Points by Sheraton, Sacramento, California, USA	
1	Win	1–0	(United States) Mia Henderson	MD	4	4 Aug 2012	(United States) Cobb Galleria Centre, Atlanta, Georgia, USA	Professional debut
