= Berston Field House =

Sports facility

Coordinates: 43.04617°N 83.69338°W

Berston Field House opened in Flint, Michigan, in 1923 and has been the backdrop for the development of some of the city's top boxing and basketball talent as well as an important symbol of race in the city's history.

Berston is one of several community centers throughout Flint that had traditionally offered recreation and health services to the community. While several have closed, Berston still houses one of the largest youth programs in a city that has had rapid population decline in the last thirty years.

The original building included a library, swimming pool, gym and auditorium. In 1930, Berston became the first community center in the city to allow black residents to use its facilities and programs.

== Sports ==
=== Basketball ===
Generations of Flint basketball players have taken part in pickup games at Berston, notably future Michigan State teammates Mateen Cleaves, Morris Peterson and Charlie Bell. All three players played with and against each other during youth and summer leagues while they were attending rival high schools in Flint. In 2009, Cleaves chose Berston as the place to have a kickoff for his foundation that tries to mentor young people.

=== Boxing ===
Berston has been a training ground for some of Flint's best fighters. Former WBO and IBF champion Chris Byrd trained there, as did Olympic bronze medalist Andre Dirrell, and more recently Olympic Gold Medalist Claressa Shields.
