= 2016 AIBA Women's World Boxing Championships – Middleweight =

Boxing competitions

Middleweight at the 2016 AIBA Women's World Boxing Championships
- Dates: 21–27 May
- Competitors: 34 from 34 nations

Medalists
gold medal	Claressa Shields	United States
silver medal	Nouchka Fontijn	Netherlands
bronze medal	Chen Nien-chin	Chinese Taipei
bronze medal	Savannah Marshall	Great Britain

The Middleweight (75 kg) competition at the 2016 AIBA Women's World Boxing Championships was held from 19 to 27 May 2016.

== Draw ==
=== Preliminaries ===
	Result	
(Tajikistan) Shoira Zulkaynarova	TKO	(Germany) Sarah Scheurich
(Turkey) Sema Çalışkan	WO	(Thailand) Sudaporn Seesondee

=== Main draw ===
Round of 32
20 May
(United States) Claressa Shields	TKO
(Germany) Sarah Scheurich
20 May
(Uzbekistan) Nafisakhon Askarova	3
(Sri Lanka) Nilanthi Andaraweera	0
20 May
(Argentina) Lucía Pérez	2
(New Zealand) Deanne Carpenter	1
20 May
(Australia) Caitlin Parker	1
(Kazakhstan) Violleta Knyazeva	2
20 May
(Panama) Atheyna Bylon	0
(Brazil) Andreia Bandeira	3
20 May
(Croatia) Anamarija Maršić	0
(Chinese Taipei) Chen Nien-chin	3
20 May
(Morocco) Khadija Mardi	3
(Republic of Ireland) Christine Desmond	0
20 May
(South Korea) Kim Shin-hyeong	0
(Canada) Ariane Fortin	3
20 May
(China) Li Qian	3
(Vietnam) Ngô Thị Chung	0
20 May
(Sweden) Anna Laurell Nash	3
(Spain) Tamara García	0
20 May
(Ukraine) Mariya Borutsa	0
(India) Pooja Rani	3
20 May
(United Kingdom) Savannah Marshall	3
(Azerbaijan) Elena Vystropova	0
20 May
(France) Erika Guerrier	3
(Hungary) Petra Szatmári	0
20 May
(North Korea) Jang Un-hui	1
(Dominican Republic) Yenebier Guillén	2
20 May
(Romania) Marinela Radu	0
(Poland) Lidia Fidura	3
20 May
(Turkey) Sema Çalışkan	0
(Netherlands) Nouchka Fontijn	3

Round of 16
22 May
(United States) Claressa Shields	3
(Uzbekistan) Nafisakhon Askarova	0
22 May
(Argentina) Lucía Pérez	0
(Kazakhstan) Violleta Knyazeva	3
22 May
(Brazil) Andreia Bandeira	0
(Chinese Taipei) Chen Nien-chin	3
22 May
(Morocco) Khadija Mardi	2
(Canada) Ariane Fortin	0
22 May
(China) Li Qian	3
(Sweden) Anna Laurell Nash	0
22 May
(India) Pooja Rani	0
(United Kingdom) Savannah Marshall	3
22 May
(France) Erika Guerrier	3
(Dominican Republic) Yenebier Guillén	0
22 May
(Poland) Lidia Fidura	0
(Netherlands) Nouchka Fontijn	3

Quarterfinals
24 May
(United States) Claressa Shields	3
(Kazakhstan) Violleta Knyazeva	0
24 May
(Chinese Taipei) Chen Nien-chin	3
(Morocco) Khadija Mardi	0
24 May
(China) Li Qian	0
(United Kingdom) Savannah Marshall	3
24 May
(France) Erika Guerrier	0
(Netherlands) Nouchka Fontijn	3

Semifinals
26 May
(United States) Claressa Shields	3
(Chinese Taipei) Chen Nien-chin	0
26 May
(United Kingdom) Savannah Marshall	0
(Netherlands) Nouchka Fontijn	3

Final
27 May
(United States) Claressa Shields	3
(Netherlands) Nouchka Fontijn	0
