= Elin Cederroos =

Swedish boxer (born 1985)

Personal information
- Born: 16 January 1985 (age 41) Sweden
- Height: 5 ft 10 1/2 in (179 cm)
- Weight: Super-middleweight

Boxing career
- Reach: 70 in (178 cm)

Boxing record
- Total fights: 10
- Wins: 8
- Win by KO: 4
- Losses: 2

Elin Cederroos (born 16 January 1985) is a Swedish former professional boxer. She was a unified super-middleweight champion, having held the IBF female title from 2019 until April 2022 and the WBA female title from January 2020 until April 2022.

== Professional career ==
Before becoming a professional boxer, Cederroos played football professionally, doing so with Hammarby and Djurgården.

Cederroos made her professional debut on 8 April 2017, after her second pregnancy, defeating Sanja Ostojić by technical knockout in the fourth round.

With only five bouts in her career, on 22 March 2019, Cederroos fought Femke Hermans for the vacant IBF female super middleweight title. Cederroos won the bout by majority decision after ten rounds.

Cederroos became a unified World champion when she defeated WBA female super-middleweight title holder Alicia Napoleon-Espinosa by unanimous decision on 10 January 2020.

In her next fight she took on WBC and WBO female super-middleweight title holder Franchón Crews-Dezurn in a bout to decide the division's undisputed champion. Cederroos lost the contest at Madison Square Garden in New York on 30 April 2022 by unanimous decision.

Cederroos fought Shadasia Green for the WBC female super-middleweight Silver title on 4 February 2023 but suffered her first stoppage defeat. Having been dropped to the canvas in round three, she was taking heavy punishment in the sixth-round when referee Danny Schiavone stepped in to call a halt to the bout.

In September 2023, Cederroos retired from boxing.

== Professional boxing record ==
10 fights	8 wins	2 losses
By knockout	4	1
By decision	4	1

No.	Result	Record	Opponent	Type	Round, time	Date	Location	Notes
10	Loss	8–2	Shadasia Green	TKO	6 (10), 1:08	4 Feb 2023	Hulu Theater, New York City, New York, US	For WBC Silver Super middleweight title
9	Loss	8–1	Franchón Crews-Dezurn	UD	10	30 Apr 2022	Madison Square Garden, New York City, New York, US	Lost WBA and IBF female super-middleweight titles; For WBC and WBO female super-middleweight titles
8	Win	8–0	Alicia Napoleon	UD	10	10 Jan 2020	Ocean Casino Resort, Atlantic City, New Jersey, US	Retained IBF female super-middleweight title; Won WBA female super-middleweight title
7	Win	7–0	Florence Muthoni	KO	3 (10)	22 Nov 2019	Pabellón Municipal, Sedaví, Spain	
6	Win	6–0	Femke Hermans	MD	10	22 Mar 2019	Belleheide Center, Roosdaal, Belgium	Won vacant IBF female super-middleweight title
5	Win	5–0	Ester Konečná	UD	8	16 Nov 2018	Recinto Ferial La Pérgola, Castellón de la Plana, Spain	
4	Win	4–0	Klaudia Vigh	TKO	5 (8), 1:29	29 Jun 2018	Marina de Valencia, Valencia, Spain	
3	Win	3–0	Elene Sikmashvili	KO	1 (8)	20 Apr 2018	Pabellón Municipal, Sedaví, Spain	
2	Win	2–0	Ester Konečná	PTS	6	2 Dec 2017	Pabellón José Antonio Alemañ Valero, Santa Pola, Spain	
1	Win	1–0	Sanja Ostojić	TKO	4 (4), 1:43	8 Apr 2017	Haninge Boxing Gym, Haninge, Sweden	

Sporting positions
World boxing titles
Vacant Title last held by Claressa Shields	IBF super-middleweight champion 22 March 2019 – 30 April 2022	Succeeded by Franchón Crews-Dezurn
Preceded by Alicia Napoleon	WBA super-middleweight champion 10 January 2020 – 30 April 2022	Succeeded by Franchón Crews-Dezurn
