= Franchón Crews-Dezurn =

American boxer (born 1987)

Personal information
- Born: 13 June 1987 (age 39) Virginia Beach, Virginia, U.S.
- Height: 5 ft 8 in (173 cm)
- Weight: Super middleweight

Boxing career
- Reach: 72 in (183 cm)
- Stance: Orthodox

Boxing record
- Total fights: 13
- Wins: 10
- Win by KO: 2
- Losses: 2
- No contests: 1
Medal record
Women's amateur boxing
Representing United States
World Championships
Silver medal – second place	2012 Qinhuangdao	Light heavyweight
Bronze medal – third place	2016 Astana	Light heavyweight

Franchón Crews-Dezurn (born June 13, 1987) is an American professional boxer. She is the current unified World Boxing Council (WBC) Super middleweight world champion and World Boxing Association (WBA) Super middleweight world champion. She was the undisputed world champion at super middleweight, losing to Savannah Marshall on 2 July 2023. She held the World Boxing Council (WBC) titles between 2018 and 2023; the World Boxing Organization (WBO) title between 2019 and 2023; and the World Boxing Association (WBA) and International Boxing Federation (IBF) title between 2022 and 2023.

== Amateur career ==
Crews-Dezurn lost to Mary Spencer in the quarter final of the 2011 Pan American Games at light heavyweight. In the 2012 AIBA Women's World Boxing Championships Crews-Dezurn boxed at light heavyweight. She beat Sabrina Delarue, Dariga Shakimova and Timea Nagy to reach the final. In the final Crews-Dezurn lost to Yuan Meiqing. That meant Crews-Dezurn got a silver medal.

In the 2016 AIBA Women's World Boxing Championship Crews-Dezurn boxed at light heavyweight. She beat Flavia Severin and Maria Kovacs to reach the semi final but lost to Yang Xiaoli so Crews-Dezurn got a bronze medal.

== Professional career ==
Crews-Dezurn debuted professionally on November 19, 2016, against two-time Olympic champion Claressa Shields, losing by unanimous decision.

Crews-Dezurn won her first professional world title in September 2018, beating Maricela Cornejo for the vacant WBC super middleweight championship, in a bout held at the Hard Rock Hotel and Casino in Las Vegas.

On September 14, 2019, in a rematch against Cornejo, Crews-Dezurn retained the WBC super middleweight title and won the WBO title, defeating her rival in ten rounds by unanimous decision.

Crews-Dezurn was signed by Golden Boy Promotions in June 2019.

On 11 January 2020, Crews-Dezurn fought Alejandra Jiménez, losing by split decision. However, on 10 February 2020, the result of the fight was changed to a "no decision," due to Jimenez having failed a pre-fight drug test. In March 2020, the WBO stripped Jimenez of their belt, and in June 2020, the WBC did the same. Both organizations also reinstated Crews-Dezurn as champion.

In April 2022 she defeated Elin Cederroos by unanimous decision at Madison Square Garden to win the WBA and IBF super middleweight titles and become undisputed super-middleweight champion.

Crews-Dezurn attempted to defend her undisputed super-middleweight title against Savannah Marshall at the Manchester Arena in Manchester, England, on 1 July 2023, losing the fight by majority decision.

After the WBC declared Marshall the champion-in-recess, Crews-Dezurn defeated the previously unbeaten Shadasia Green to regain the title on 15 December 2023.

She defended the title for the first time against Citlalli Ortiz at Turning Stone Resort Casino in Verona, New York, on 6 June 2025, winning by majority decision.

Crews-Dezurn challenged undisputed female heavyweight champion Claressa Shields at Little Caesars Arena in Detroit, Michigan, on February 22, 2026. She lost via unanimous decision.

== Outside boxing ==
Growing up Crews-Dezurn wanted to be a singer. Before she became a professional boxer she was a contestant on American Idol. She has recorded songs in the studio. In the music industry she is referred to as Franchon Heavy Hitting Diva.

== Professional boxing record ==
14 fights	10 wins	3 losses
By knockout	2	0
By decision	8	3
No contests	1	

No.	Result	Record	Opponent	Type	Round, time	Date	Location	Notes
14	Loss	10–3 (1)	Claressa Shields	UD	10	Feb 22, 2026	Little Caesars Arena, Detroit, Michigan, U.S.	For the WBA, WBC, IBF, WBO, and WBF female heavyweight titles
13	Win	10–2 (1)	Citlalli Ortiz	MD	10	Jun 6, 2025	Turning Stone Resort Casino, Verona, New York, U.S.	Retained WBA and WBC female super middleweight titles
12	Win	9–2 (1)	Shadasia Green	UD	10	Dec 15, 2023	Caribe Royale Orlando, Orlando, Florida, U.S.	Won WBA interim and vacant WBC female super middleweight titles
11	Loss	8–2 (1)	Savannah Marshall	MD	10	Jul 1, 2023	AO Arena, Manchester, England, U.K.	Lost WBA, WBC, IBF, WBO, and The Ring super middleweight title
10	Win	8–1 (1)	Elin Cederroos	UD	10	Apr 30, 2022	Madison Square Garden, New York City, New York, U.S.	Retained WBC and WBO female super middleweight titles; Won WBA, IBF, and inaugural The Ring super middleweight titles
9	Win	7–1 (1)	Ashleigh Curry	UD	8	Jan 2, 2021	American Airlines Center, Dallas, Texas, U.S.	
8	NC	6–1 (1)	Alejandra Jiménez	NC	10	Jan 11, 2020	Alamodome, San Antonio, Texas, U.S.	WBC and WBO female super middleweight titles were at stake; Originally SD win for Jiménez, later ruled NC after she failed a drug test
7	Win	6–1	Maricela Cornejo	UD	10	Sep 14, 2019	Dignity Health Sports Park, Carson, California, U.S.	Retained WBC female super middleweight title; Won vacant WBO female super middleweight title
6	Win	5–1	Kayla Williams	TKO	5 (10)	Jun 20, 2019	Ocean Casino Resort, Atlantic City, New Jersey, U.S.	
5	Win	4–1	Maricela Cornejo	MD	10	Aug 13, 2018	Hard Rock Hotel and Casino, Paradise, Nevada, U.S.	Won vacant WBC female super middleweight title
4	Win	3–1	Tiffany Woodard	UD	6	Jan 12, 2018	Turning Stone Resort Casino, Verona, New York, U.S.	
3	Win	2–1	Sydney LeBlanc	UD	4	Aug 12, 2017	Howard Theatre, Washington, D.C., U.S.	
2	Win	1–1	Latasha Burton	TKO	1 (4)	Mar 25, 2017	UDC Physical Activities Center, Washington, D.C., U.S	
1	Loss	0–1	Claressa Shields	UD	4	Nov 19, 2016	T-Mobile Arena, Paradise, Nevada, U.S.	

== See also ==
- List of female boxers

Sporting positions
World boxing titles
Vacant Title last held by Claressa Shields	WBC female super middleweight champion September 13, 2018 – July 1, 2023	Succeeded by Savannah Marshall
Vacant Title last held by Femke Hermans	WBO female super middleweight champion September 14, 2019 – July 1, 2023	Succeeded by Savannah Marshall
Preceded by Elin Cederroos	WBA female super middleweight champion April 30, 2022 – July 1, 2023	Succeeded by Savannah Marshall
Preceded by Elin Cederroos	IBF female super middleweight champion April 30, 2022 – July 1, 2023	Succeeded by Savannah Marshall
Inaugural champion	The Ring female super middleweight champion April 30, 2022 – July 1, 2023	Succeeded by Savannah Marshall
Vacant Title last held by Natascha Ragosina	Undisputed female super middleweight champion April 30, 2022 – July 1, 2023	Succeeded by Savannah Marshall
Vacant Title last held by Savannah Marshall	WBC female super middleweight champion December 15, 2023 – present	Incumbent
New title	WBA female super middleweight champion Interim title December 15, 2023 – present	Incumbent
