= Femke Hermans =

Belgian boxer (born 1990)

Personal information
- Nationality: Belgian
- Born: 5 February 1990 (age 36) Dendermonde, Belgium
- Height: 5 ft 8 in (173 cm)
- Weight: Super-welterweight; Middleweight; Super-middleweight

Boxing career
- Stance: Orthodox

Boxing record
- Total fights: 24
- Wins: 19
- Win by KO: 7
- Losses: 5

Femke Hermans (pronounced [ˈfɛmkə ˈɦɛrmɑns]) (born 5 February 1990) is a Belgian professional boxer She is a former IBF and IBO female super-welterweight champion and also held the WBO female super-middleweight title.

== Professional career ==
Hermans made her professional debut on 23 January 2016, scoring a six-round unanimous decision (UD) victory against Galina Gyumliyska at the Sportloods Waarborre in Asse, Belgium.

After a technical knockout (TKO) victory against Vladislava Lopuhova in June, Hermans defeated Elene Sikmashvili via second-round knockout (KO) on 8 October, capturing the inaugural Belgian and vacant BeNeLux female super-middleweight titles in Middelkerke, Belgium.

In her next fight she faced Borislava Goranova for the WBF International female super-middleweight title on 21 January 2017, at the Sportloods Waarborre. Hermans captured the title via eight-round UD, with two judges scoring the bout 80–72 and the third judge scored it 79–73.

Two fights later she challenged for her first world title, facing Alicia Napoleon for the vacant WBA female super-middleweight title on 3 March 2018, at the Barclays Center in Brooklyn, New York. The bout was televised live on Showtime as part of the undercard for Deontay Wilder vs. Luis Ortiz. Hermans suffered the first defeat of her career, losing via UD with the judges' scorecards reading 99–91, 98–92 and 98–92.

She made a second attempt at a world title in her next fight, facing Nikki Adler for the vacant WBO female super-middleweight title on 12 May 2018, at the Eisstadion in Augsburg, Germany. Hermans defeated Adler via UD to become the second Belgian woman (after Delfine Persoon) to win a major world title. One judge scored the bout 99–91 and the other two scored it 97–93.

After two UD victories in non-title fights, Hermans moved down a weight class to challenge Claressa Shields for the unified WBA, WBC, and IBF female middleweight titles on 8 December 2018, at the StubHub Center in Carson, California. In an event that served as HBO's last televised boxing show, Hermans suffered the second defeat of her career, losing via UD over ten rounds, with all three judges scoring the bout 100–90.

She moved back up to super-middleweight in her next fight, facing Elin Cederroos for the vacant IBF female title on 22 March 2019, at the Belleheide Center in Roosdaal, Belgium. Hermans suffered her second consecutive defeat, and the third of her career, losing via majority decision with two judges scoring the bout 96–94 in favour of Cederroos while the third judge scored it even at 95–95.

Following a TKO victory in a rematch with Borislava Goranova in October 2020, Hermans faced Luiza Davydova for the inaugural European female middleweight title on 5 December 2020, at the Fight Off Training Center in Wavre, Belgium. Hermans defeated Goranova via UD, with all three judges scoring the bout 98–92.

Hermans challenged Savannah Marshall for the WBO female middleweight World title on 2 April 2022 but lost the contest in Newcastle, England, when she was knocked out in round three.

Switching to super-welterweight, she claimed the vacant IBO title with a win over the previously unbeaten Mary Spencer by unanimous decision in Shawnigan, Quebec, Canada, on 16 December 2022.

Hermans made an emphatic first defense of her title on 17 June 2023 when her challenger, Maria Lindberg, retired at the end of the first-round of their fight in Roosdaal, Belgium, having been knocked to the canvas just before the bell.

She put her belt on the line in a rematch against Spencer on 11 October 2023, in Montreal, Canada, with the vacant IBF female super-welterweight World title also up for grabs. Once again Hermans got the victory, this time by majority decision.

Herman's lost her titles to Oshae Jones by split decision in Atlanta, Georgia, USA, on 22 November 2024, with the judges' scorecards reading 97–93, 94–96 and 93–97.

After more than 18 months away from the competitive boxing ring, Hermans returned to face Arlene Blencowe for the vacant WBC Silver female super-welterweight title at Hall des Expositions in Charleroi, Belgium, winning via unanimous decision.

== Professional boxing record ==
24 fights	19 wins	5 losses
By knockout	7	1
By decision	12	4

No.	Result	Record	Opponent	Type	Round, time	Date	Location	Notes
24	Win	19–5	Arlene Blencowe	UD	10	30 May 2026	Hall des Expositions, Charleroi, Belgium	Won vacant WBC Silver female super-welterweight title
23	Loss	18–5	Oshae Jones	SD	10	22 Nov 2024	Corey Studios at Corey Tower, Atlanta, U.S.	Lost IBF and IBO female super-welterweight titles
22	Win	18–4	Ester Konecna	UD	6	13 Jan 2024	Golden Gloves Gym, Ghent, Belgium	
21	Win	17-4	Mary Spencer	MD	10	11 Oct 2023	Montreal Casino, Montreal, Canada	Retained IBO female super welterweight title; Won vacant IBF female super welterweight title
20	Win	16–4	Maria Lindberg	RTD	1 (10), 2:00	17 Jun 2023	Alfasun Indoor Arena, Roosdaal, Belgium	Retained IBO female super welterweight title
19	Win	15–4	Katarina Vistica	KO	5 (8), 1:17	11 Mar 2023	Ecaussinnes, Belgium	
18	Win	14–4	Mary Spencer	UD	10	16 Dec 2022	Centre Gervais Auto, Shawinigan, Canada	Won vacant IBO female super welterweight title
17	Win	13–4	Bojana Libiszewska	UD	6	25 Jun 2022	Rue du sceptre 1319, Ixelles, Belgium	
16	Loss	12–4	Savannah Marshall	KO	3 (10), 2:59	2 Apr 2022	Vertu Motors Arena, Newcastle, England	For WBO female middleweight title
15	Win	12–3	Lili Jumali	KO	3 (6), 1:15	17 Jul 2021	Stade du Heysel, Brussels, Belgium	
14	Win	11–3	Luiza Davydova	UD	10	5 Dec 2020	Fight Off Training Center, Wavre, Belgium	Won inaugural European female middleweight title
13	Win	10–3	Borislava Goranova	TKO	3 (6), 1:50	9 Oct 2020	Roosdaal, Belgium	
12	Loss	9–3	Elin Cederroos	MD	10	22 Mar 2019	Belleheide Center, Roosdaal, Belgium	For vacant IBF female super middleweight title
11	Loss	9–2	Claressa Shields	UD	10	8 Dec 2018	StubHub Center, Carson, California, US	For WBA, WBC, and IBF female middleweight titles
10	Win	9–1	Ester Konecna	UD	6	15 Sep 2018	Evenementenhal DOC, Alsemberg, Belgium	
9	Win	8–1	Florence Muthoni	UD	6	29 Jun 2018	Belleheide Center, Roosdaal, Belgium	
8	Win	7–1	Nikki Adler	UD	10	12 May 2018	Eisstadion, Augsburg, Germany	Won vacant WBO female super-middleweight title
7	Loss	6–1	Alicia Napoleon	UD	10	3 Mar 2018	Barclays Center, New York City, New York, US	For vacant WBA female super-middleweight title
6	Win	6–0	Ester Konecna	UD	6	30 Sep 2017	Sportcomplex Schotte, Aalst, Belgium	
5	Win	5–0	Klaudia Vigh	TKO	2 (6)	17 Jun 2017	Sporthal Tempelhof, Bruges, Belgium	
4	Win	4–0	Borislava Goranova	UD	10	21 Jan 2017	Asse, Belgium	Won inaugural WBF International female super-middleweight title
3	Win	3–0	Elene Sikmashvili	KO	2 (10)	8 Oct 2016	Middelkerke, Belgium	Won inaugural Belgian and vacant BeNeLux female super-middleweight titles
2	Win	2–0	Vladislava Lopuhova	TKO	1 (6)	25 Jun 2016	Ninove, Belgium	
1	Win	1–0	Galina Gyumliyska	UD	6	23 Jan 2016	Sportloods Waarborre, Asse, Belgium	

Sporting positions
Regional boxing titles
Inaugural champion	Belgian female super-middleweight champion 8 October 2016 – January 2017	Vacant
N/A	BeNeLux female super-middleweight champion 8 October 2016 – January 2017	N/A
Inaugural champion	WBF International female super-middleweight champion 21 January 2017 – 2018	Vacant
Inaugural champion	European female middleweight champion 5 December 2020 – 2021	Vacant
World boxing titles
Vacant Title last held by Christina Hammer	WBO female super-middleweight champion 12 May 2018 – 2019	Vacant Title next held by Franchón Crews-Dezurn
