= Savannah Marshall =

British boxer (born 1991)

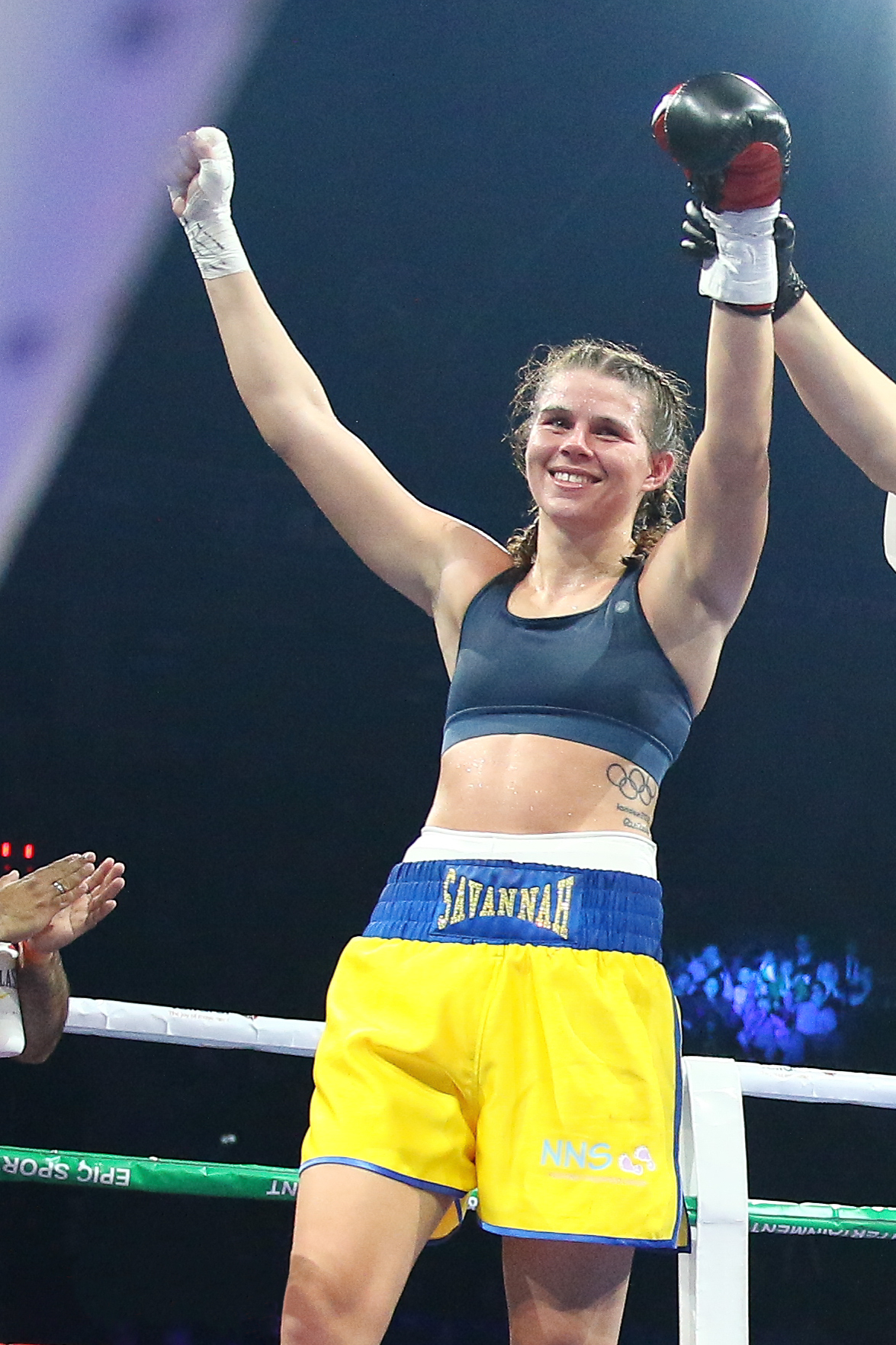
- Marshall in 2018

Personal information
- Nickname: Silent Assassin
- Born: Savannah Rose Dee Marshall; 19 May 1991 (age 35) Hartlepool, County Durham, England
- Height: 5 ft 10.5 in (179 cm)
- Weight: Middleweight; Super-middleweight

Boxing career
- Reach: 72 in (183 cm)

Boxing record
- Total fights: 15
- Wins: 13
- Win by KO: 10
- Losses: 2
Medal record
Women's amateur boxing
Representing Great Britain
World Championships
Bronze medal – third place	2016 Astana	Middleweight
Representing England
World Championships
Gold medal – first place	2012 Qinhuangdao	Middleweight
Silver medal – second place	2010 Bridgetown	Welterweight
European Championships
Bronze medal – third place	2011 Rotterdam	Middleweight
Commonwealth Games
Gold medal – first place	2014 Glasgow	Middleweight

Savannah Rose Dee Marshall (born 19 May 1991) is a British professional boxer and professional mixed martial artist. She has held world championships in two weight classes: the undisputed (Note: World Boxing Association (WBA), World Boxing Council (WBC), International Boxing Federation (IBF), and World Boxing Organization (WBO) female titles) and Ring magazine female super-middleweight titles; and the World Boxing Organization (WBO) female middleweight title. As an amateur, she became the first British female world champion after securing gold at the 2012 World Championships.

== Early life ==
Savannah Rose Dee Marshall was born on 19 May 1991 in Hartlepool, County Durham. She attended the English Martyrs School, where she achieved 12 GCSEs before gaining a Distinction in a BTEC National Diploma in Sport at Hartlepool College.

She began boxing aged 12, when she joined a local Hartlepool Headland club after seeing a boy showing off his trophy on the street and decided she wanted one. She went to her local boxing club with two of her girl friends however her friends only went once and decided not to go back. The club had no girls training at this time and had constantly tried to discourage Marshall. She stated that she thinks the trainer looked at her as 'an annoying little girl who kept on coming back' but she was determined, having fallen in love with the sport. They learned to accept her and began to support her.

She sparred with the boys at her club. However, when going to other gyms to get sparring partners, it was a struggle. A head trainer of one gym pointed at Savannah and said "what's that? She is not sparring here" and Savannah had to sit and watch the session.

== Amateur boxing career ==
Marshall became the first British female world champion by winning gold at the 2012 World Championships in Qinhuangdao, China.

She was considered a favourite to win gold at the 2012 London Olympics. However, she was defeated 16–12 by Marina Volnova of Kazakhstan in her opening, quarter-final.

Marshall remains the only boxer ever to have defeated Claressa Shields, the middleweight women's gold medallist in the 2012 Olympics; the bout took place in the second round of the 2012 AIBA Women's World Boxing Championships in Qinhuangdao.

At the 2014 Commonwealth Games in Glasgow, Marshall beat Ariane Fortin of Canada to take the gold medal in the women's middleweight division.

In May 2016, Marshall qualified for the 2016 Rio Olympics, after reaching the semi-finals of the 2016 AIBA Women's World Boxing Championships in Kazakhstan. She lost in the quarter-finals to Nouchka Fontijn from the Netherlands by split decision.

== Professional boxing career ==
On 18 May 2017, during a press conference to promote the IBF junior-lightweight title defence of Mayweather promoted Gervonta Davis against former British champion Liam Walsh, Floyd Mayweather Jr. announced to the press that he had signed Marshall to a professional promotional contract. Marshall made her professional boxing debut at super-middleweight on the undercard of The Money Fight, in the professional boxing super-fight between undefeated five-division champion Floyd Mayweather Jr. and the former UFC Lightweight Champion and Featherweight Champion Conor McGregor. It took place at the T-Mobile Arena in Paradise, Nevada on 26 August 2017. She defeated Sydney LeBlanc by unanimous decision 40–36 in a four-round bout.

Marshall lifted the vacant WBA super-middleweight Inter-continental title in Sofia, Bulgaria, after winning all 10 rounds to claim a comfortable points victory over Yanina Orozco of Argentina.

On 31 October 2020, in her ninth professional fight, Marshall became the WBO female middleweight world champion with a TKO victory over Hannah Rankin at Wembley Arena.

Marshall was initially scheduled to face Claressa Shields in a title unification bout on September 10, 2022. However, due to the death of Queen Elizabeth II the bout was postponed to take place on October 15, 2022. Marshall lost the fight via unanimous decision with two judges scoring the fight 97–93 and one scoring it 96–94. This fight occurred at the O2 Arena and was the first-time two female boxers headlined at a major venue in the United Kingdom. As well, the fight headlined the first all-female boxing card in the United Kingdom.

Marshall challenged Franchón Crews-Dezurn for her undisputed super-middleweight world titles in the main event at the Manchester Arena on 1 July 2023 winning by majority decision.

Marshall signed with Jake Paul's Most Valuable Promotions in May 2025.

Holding the IBF super middleweight title, Marshall faced WBO champion Shadasia Green at Madison Square Garden, New York City, New York, on July 11, 2025, in a unification fight. She lost by split decision.

== Mixed martial arts career ==
Marshall made her MMA debut on 8 June 2024, stopping Mirela Vargas in the first round at PFL Europe in Newcastle on 8 June 2024.

== Professional boxing record ==
15 fights	13 wins	2 losses
By knockout	10	0
By decision	3	2

No.	Result	Record	Opponent	Type	Round, time	Date	Location	Notes
15	Loss	13–2	Shadasia Green	SD	10	11 Jul 2025	Madison Square Garden, New York City, New York, U.S.	Lost IBF female super-middleweight title; for WBO female super-middleweight title
14	Win	13–1	Franchón Crews-Dezurn	MD	10	1 Jul 2023	AO Arena, Manchester, England	Won WBA, WBC, IBF, WBO, and The Ring female super-middleweight titles
13	Loss	12–1	Claressa Shields	UD	10	15 Oct 2022	The O2 Arena, London, England	Lost WBO female middleweight title; For WBA, WBC, IBF, WBF, and The Ring female middleweight titles
12	Win	12–0	Femke Hermans	KO	3 (10), 2:59	2 Apr 2022	Vertu Motors Arena, Newcastle, England	Retained WBO female middleweight title
11	Win	11–0	Lolita Muzeya	TKO	2 (10), 1:58	16 Oct 2021	Utilita Arena, Newcastle, England	Retained WBO female middleweight title
10	Win	10–0	Maria Lindberg	KO	3 (10), 1:11	10 Apr 2021	Copper Box Arena, London, England	Retained WBO female middleweight title
9	Win	9–0	Hannah Rankin	TKO	7 (10), 1:59	31 Oct 2020	The SSE Arena, London, England	Won vacant WBO female middleweight title
8	Win	8–0	Ashleigh Curry	TKO	3 (10), 0:47	19 Oct 2019	Utilita Arena, Newcastle, England	
7	Win	7–0	Daniele Bastieri	TKO	5 (8), 2:00	31 Aug 2019	The O2 Arena, London, England	
6	Win	6–0	Borislava Goranova	KO	1 (6), 1:11	25 May 2019	O2 Victoria Warehouse, Manchester, England	
5	Win	5–0	Klaudia Vígh	TKO	2 (6), 1:05	9 Nov 2018	O2 Victoria Warehouse, Manchester, England	
4	Win	4–0	Yanina Orozco	UD	10	27 Oct 2018	Arena Armeec, Sofia, Bulgaria	Won vacant WBA Inter-Continental super-middleweight title
3	Win	3–0	Alejandra Ayala	TKO	2 (6), 1:58	15 Jun 2018	York Hall, London, England	
2	Win	2–0	Ester Konecna	TKO	2 (8), 1:43	12 May 2018	Whites Hotel, Bolton, England	
1	Win	1–0	Sydney LeBlanc	UD	4	26 Aug 2017	T-Mobile Arena, Paradise, Nevada, US	

== Mixed martial arts record ==
Professional record breakdown
1 match	1 win	0 losses
By knockout	1	0

Res.	Record	Opponent	Method	Event	Date	Round	Time	Location	Notes
Win	1–0	Mirela Vargas	TKO (punches)	PFL Europe 2 (2024)	June 8, 2024	1	4:27	Newcastle, England	Catchweight (160 lb) debut.

== See also ==
- List of female boxers

== Notes ==
Sporting positions
Regional boxing titles
Inaugural champion	WBA Inter-Continental female super-middleweight champion 27 October 2018 – 2019	Vacant
World boxing titles
Vacant Title last held by Claressa Shields	WBO female middleweight champion 31 October 2020 – 15 October 2022	Succeeded by Claressa Shields
Preceded by Franchón Crews-Dezurn	WBA female super middleweight champion 1 July 2023 – present	Incumbent
Preceded by Franchón Crews-Dezurn	WBC female super middleweight champion 1 July 2023 – 5 October 2023; Status changed	Vacant Title next held by Franchón Crews-Dezurn
Preceded by Franchón Crews-Dezurn	IBF female super middleweight champion 1 July 2023 – present	Incumbent
Preceded by Franchón Crews-Dezurn	WBO female super middleweight champion 1 July 2023 – present	Incumbent
Preceded by Franchón Crews-Dezurn	The Ring female super middleweight champion 1 July 2023 – present	Incumbent
Preceded by Franchón Crews-Dezurn	Undisputed female super middleweight champion 1 July 2023 – 5 October 2023; Titles fragmented	Vacant
Honorary boxing titles
New title	WBC female super middleweight Champion in Recess; 5 October 2023 – present	Incumbent
