= Vanessa Lepage-Joanisse =

Canadian boxer

- Born: Vanessa Lepage-Joanisse; July 20, 1995 (age 31); Saint André Avellin, Quebec, Canada
- Other names: Rampage
- Height: 168 cm (5 ft 6 in)
- Division: Heavyweight
- Stance: Orthodox
- Years active: 2016 - Present

Professional boxing record
- Total: 9
- Wins: 7
- By knockout: 2
- Losses: 2
- By knockout: 2
- Draws: 0

Other information
- Boxing record from BoxRec

Vanessa Lepage-Joanisse (born 20 July 1995) is a Canadian professional boxer who held the WBC female heavyweight title from 7 March 2024 to 27 July 2024.

== Professional boxing career ==
Undefeated in her first three professional contests, Lepage-Joanisse unsuccessfully challenged Alejandra Jimenez for the World Boxing Council female World heavyweight title on 12 August 2017 losing by TKO in the third round. After this defeat, Lepage-Joanisse stepped away from boxing for almost six years before making a comeback in March 2023. She became the WBC female heavyweight champion when she defeated Abril Vidal by split decision at the Montreal Casino on 7 March 2024.

Lepage-Joanisse agreed to defend her WBC heavyweight title against Claressa Shields at Little Caesars Arena in Detroit, Michigan on July 27, 2024. The bout was contested at 175 lbs with the vacant WBO light heavyweight belt also on the line. Lepage-Joanisse was dropped three times in the second round and lost the fight via technical knockout.

== Professional boxing record ==
9 fights	7 wins	2 losses
By knockout	2	2
By decision	5	0
Draws	0	

No.	Result	Record	Opponent	Type	Round, time	Date	Location	Notes
9	Lost	7-2	Claressa Shields	TKO	2 (10)	Jul 27, 2024	Little Caesars Arena, Detroit, Michigan, U.S.	Lost WBC female heavyweight title; For vacant WBO female light heavyweight and vacant WBF female heavyweight titles
8	Win	7-1	Abril Argentina Vidal	SD	10	Mar 7, 2024	Montreal Casino, Montreal, Canada	Won vacant WBC female heavyweight title
7	Win	6-1	Timea Nagy	UD	6	Sep 8, 2023	Lac Leamy Casino, Gatineau, Canada	
6	Win	5-1	Valeria Segovia Alonzo	RTD	1 (6)	May 5, 2023	Cuernavaca, Morelos, Mexico	
5	Win	4-1	Princess Hairston	UD	4	Mar 23, 2023	Montreal Casino, Montreal, Canada	
4	Loss	3-1	Alejandra Jimenez	TKO	3 (10)	Aug 12, 2017	Arena Oasis, Cancun, Mexico	For WBC female heavyweight title
3	Win	3-0	Maria Jose Velis	TKO	3 (4)	Dec 23, 2016	Lac Leamy Casino, Gatineau, Canada	
2	Win	2-0	Annie Mazerolle	UD	4	May 13, 2016	Metropolis, Montreal, Canada	
1	Win	1-0	Annie Mazerolle	SD	4	Mar 19, 2016	Moncton Lions Activity Center, Moncton, Canada	
