= Claressa Shields =

American boxer (born 1995)

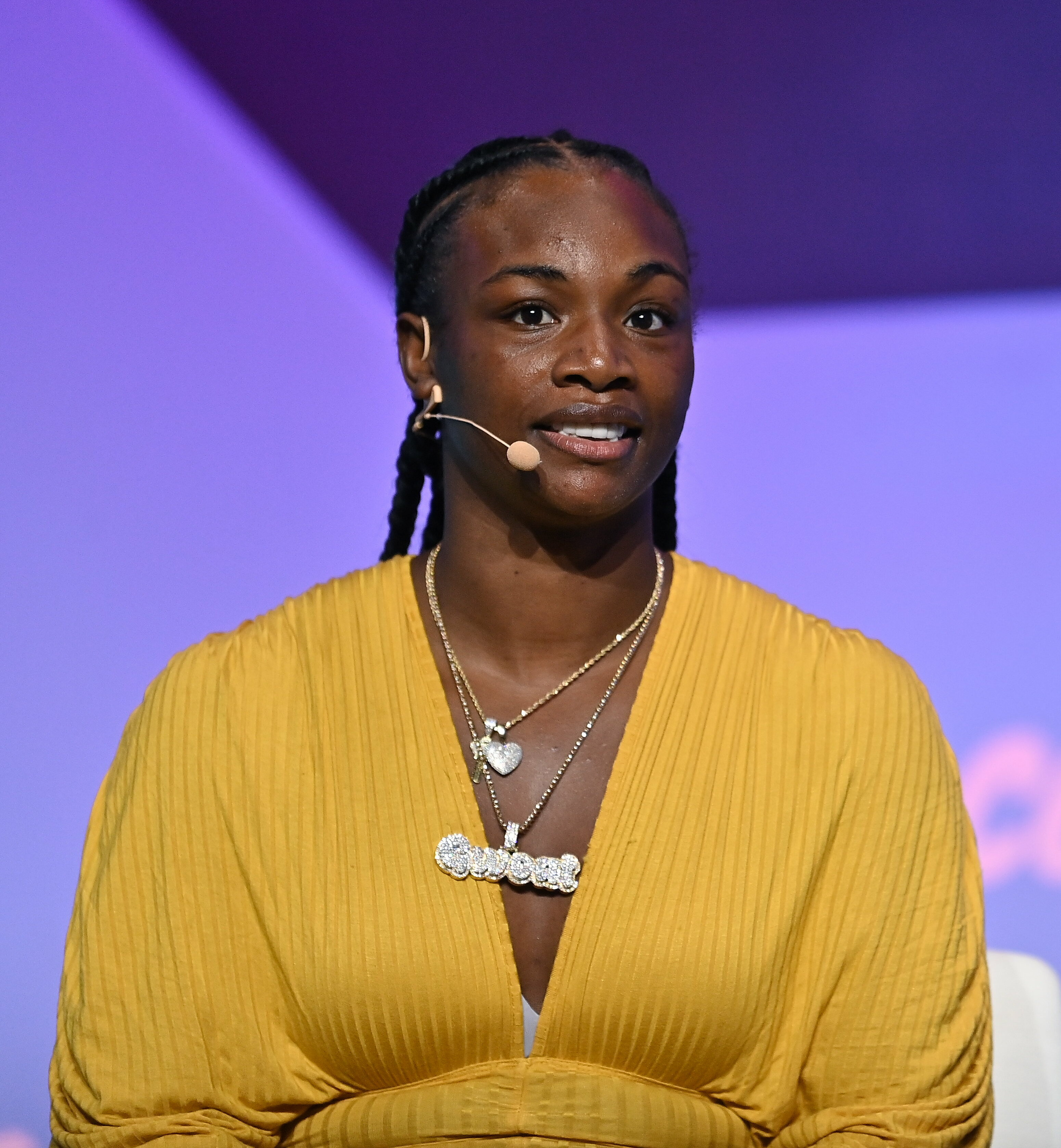
- Shields at Collision 2022
- Born: Claressa Maria Shields; March 17, 1995 (age 31); Flint, Michigan, U.S.
- Nickname: T-Rex, GWOAT
- Height: 5 ft 8 in (173 cm)
- Division: Light middleweight (Boxing); Middleweight (Boxing); Super middleweight (Boxing); Light heavyweight (Boxing); Heavyweight (Boxing); Lightweight (MMA) (2021–present)
- Reach: 68 in (173 cm)
- Stance: Orthodox
- Team: Jackson Wink MMA Academy (2020–2024) (MMA)
- Years active: 2016–present

Professional boxing record
- Total: 19
- Wins: 19
- By knockout: 4

Mixed martial arts record
- Total: 3
- Wins: 2
- By knockout: 1
- By decision: 1
- Losses: 1
- By decision: 1

Other information
- Boxing record from BoxRec
- Mixed martial arts record from Sherdog
Medal record
Representing the United States
Women's amateur boxing
Olympic Games
Gold medal – first place	2012 London	Middleweight
Gold medal – first place	2016 Rio de Janeiro	Middleweight
Youth World Championships
Gold medal – first place	2013 Albena	Middleweight
World Championships
Gold medal – first place	2014 Jeju	Middleweight
Gold medal – first place	2016 Astana	Middleweight
Pan American Games
Gold medal – first place	2015 Toronto	Light heavyweight
American Continental Championships
Gold medal – first place	2012 Cornwall	Middleweight
Gold medal – first place	2014 Guadalajara	Middleweight
U.S. National Championships
Gold medal – first place	2014 Spokane	Middleweight
Gold medal – first place	2015 Spokane	Middleweight
U.S. National Junior Olympics
Gold medal – first place	2010 Camp Lejeune	Light Middleweight
Gold medal – first place	2011 Mobile	Light Middleweight
National PAL Championships
Gold medal – first place	2011 Toledo	Middleweight
Gold medal – first place	2012 Toledo	Middleweight
U.S. Olympic Trials
Gold medal – first place	2012 Airway Heights	Middleweight
Gold medal – first place	2015 Memphis	Middleweight
Pan American Olympic Festival
Gold medal – first place	2014 Mexico City	Middleweight
American Olympic Qualifying
Gold medal – first place	2016 Buenos Aires	Middleweight

YouTube information
- Channel: Claressa Shields
- Subscribers: 216 thousand
- Views: 48 million
- Last updated: August 16, 2026
- Website: claressathegwoat.com

Claressa Maria Shields (born March 17, 1995) is an American professional boxer and former professional mixed martial artist. She has held 20 major world championships spanning five weight classes, including the undisputed female light middleweight title in March 2021; the undisputed female middleweight title twice between 2019 and 2024; the World Boxing Council (WBC) and International Boxing Federation (IBF) female super middleweight titles from 2017 to 2018; the World Boxing Organization (WBO) female light heavyweight title from 2024 to 2025 and the undisputed female heavyweight title from 2025 to 2026. Shields currently holds the record for becoming a two, three, four and five division world champion in the fewest professional fights. As of August 12, 2025, she is ranked the world's best active female light heavyweight by BoxRec, as well as the best active female boxer, pound for pound, by ESPN and The Ring.

Shields is the only female boxer in history to have held all four major world titles—WBA, WBC, IBF and WBO—in three weight classes. She is also the third female boxer, after Amanda Serrano and Naoko Fujioka, to become a champion in five different divisions. The Boxing Writers Association of America named her Female Fighter of the Year in 2018 and 2022. In July 2024, ESPN ranked her as the best female boxer of the 21st century.

In a decorated amateur career, Shields won gold medals in the women's middleweight division at the 2012 and 2016 Olympics, making her the first American boxer to win consecutive Olympic medals. Shields was the youngest boxer at the February 2012 U.S. Olympic Trials, winning the event in the 165 lb (75 kg) middleweight division. In May, she qualified for the 2012 Games, the first year in which women's boxing was an Olympic event, and went on to become the first American woman to win an Olympic gold medal in boxing.

Shields was also a former professional mixed martial artist, competing in the Professional Fighters League from 2021 to 2024 and retiring with a 2–1 record.

== Early life ==
Shields was born and raised in Flint, Michigan. She was introduced to boxing by her father, Bo Shields, who had boxed in underground leagues. Bo went to prison when Shields was two years old. Following his release when she was nine, he talked to her about boxer Laila Ali, piquing her interest in the sport. Bo, however, believed that boxing was a men's sport and refused to allow Shields to pursue it until she was eleven. She began boxing at Berston Field House in Flint, where she met her coach and trainer, Jason Crutchfield. Shields credits her grandmother with encouraging her to not accept restrictions based on her gender.

== Amateur career ==
=== 2011–2013 ===
After winning a couple of regional titles and two Junior Olympic Championships, Shields competed in her first open-division tournament, the National Police Athletic League Championships 2011; she won the middleweight title and was named top overall fighter and also qualified for the U.S. Olympic Trials. At the 2012 Olympic Trials, she defeated the reigning national champion, Franchón Crews-Dezurn, the 2010 world champion, Andrecia Wasson, and Pittsburgh's Tika Hemingway to win the middleweight class. In April 2012, she won her weight class at the Women's Elite Continental Championships in Cornwall, Ontario against three-time defending world champion Mary Spencer of Canada; she held an undefeated record of 25 wins and 0 losses at that point.

Following Shields' victory at the U.S. Olympic Trials, it was initially reported that she would need only a top-8 finish at the 2012 AIBA Women's World Boxing Championships in Qinhuangdao, China, in order to qualify for the 2012 Olympics.

On May 10, the day after the contest began but before Shields' first bout, a change to the rules was announced that meant Shields would need to place in the top two from the (North, Central, and South) American Boxing Confederation region of AIBA (AMBC).

Shields won her first round but was beaten in the second round on May 13 to Savannah Marshall of England, bringing Shields' record to 26–1.

Her chances for qualification thus depended on Marshall's subsequent performance; after Marshall advanced to the middleweight finals on May 18, it was announced that Shields had earned an Olympic berth. At the 2012 Summer Olympics in London, aged 17, she won the gold medal in the women's middleweight division after beating veteran Russian boxer Nadezda Torlopova 19–12. This made her the first American woman to win a boxing gold medal.

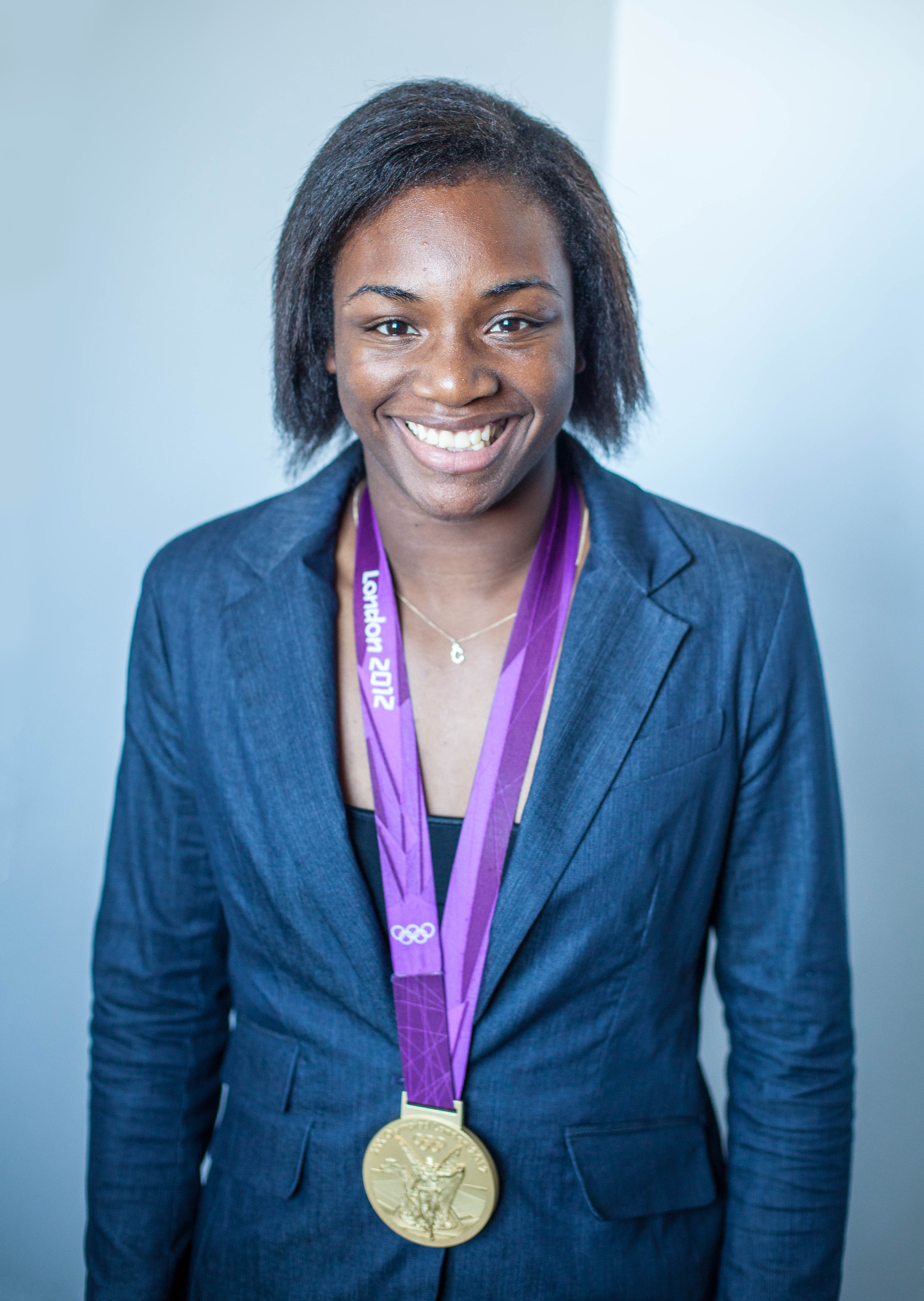
Shields with her Olympic gold medal in 2012

In October 2012, she competed in her second National PAL Championships, beating Franchón Crews-Dezurn in the finals to win gold at middleweight in the open division.

At the 2013 IBA Youth World Boxing Championships in Bulgaria, Shields defeated polish boxer Elżbieta Wójcik to win gold in the middleweight class.

=== 2014–2016 ===
In 2014, Shields won gold at the U.S. National Championships in Spokane, Washington. In June 2014, she beat Yenebier Guillén in the finals of the Pan American Olympic Festival and took home gold at middleweight. In September, she defeated Canada's Ariane Fortin in the final round to win the middleweight title at the Elite Women's Continental Championships for the second time of her amateur boxing career. She picked up yet another gold medal at the World Championships in Jeju City, South Korea, and the following year, she became the first American to win titles in women's boxing at the Olympics and Pan American Games. As a result of her performance in the 2015 Pan American Games, she was given the honour of serving as Team USA's flag bearer at the closing ceremony.

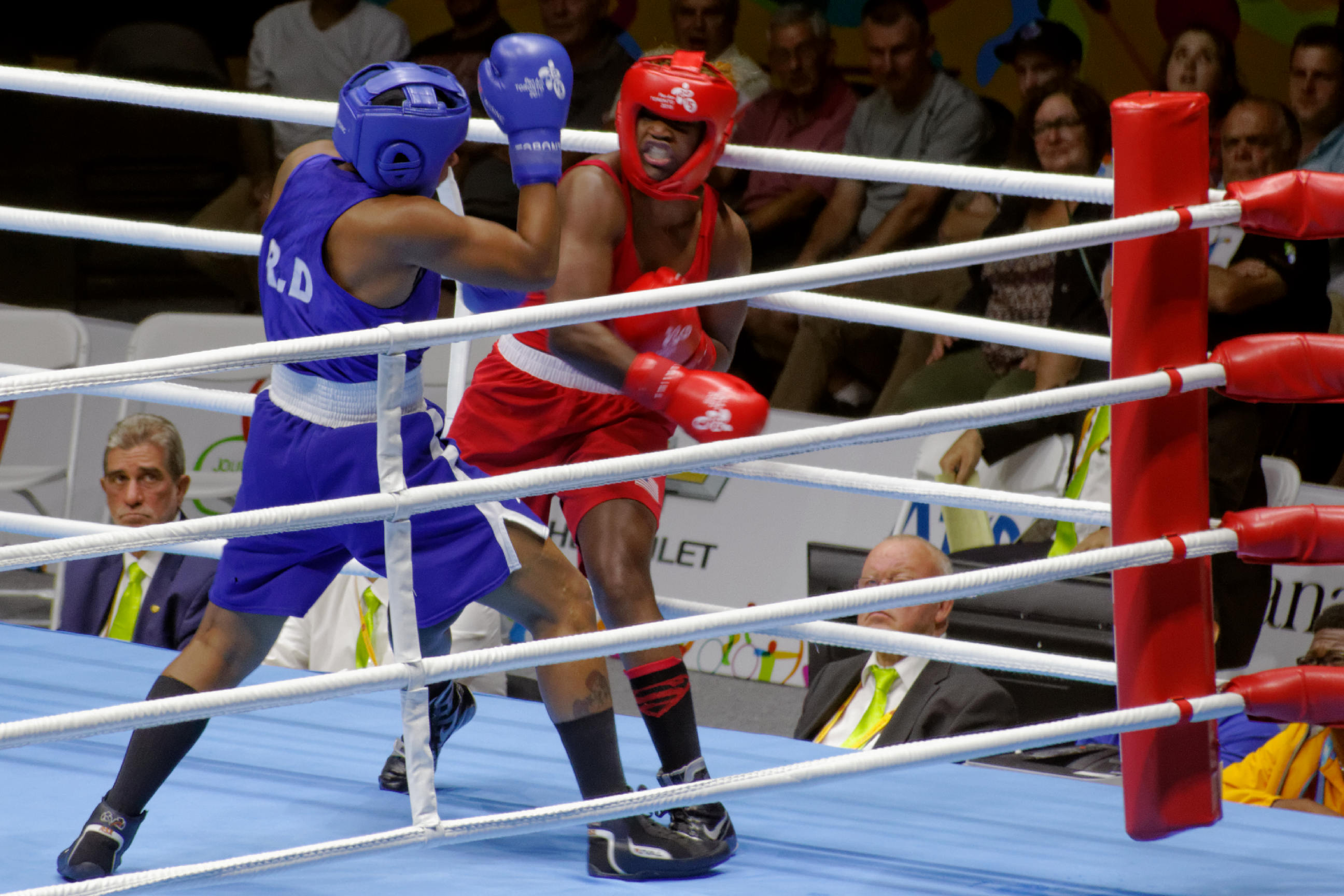
Shields (in red) vs. Yenebier Guillén Benítez, 2015

Shields defended her gold at the 2015 U.S. National Championships by defeating Raquel Miller in the finals.

Shields won the gold medal at the 2016 AMBC Olympic Qualifying Tournament in Argentina defeating Dominican Republic's Yenebier Guillén in her final bout on her 21st birthday. In May 2016, Shields defeated Nouchka Fontijn by unanimous decision to win gold at the World Championships. Later that year, at the 2016 Summer Olympics in Rio, she won the gold medal in the women's middleweight division by again defeating Nouchka Fontijn of the Netherlands. She was awarded the inaugural women's division of the Val Barker Trophy at the competition. Her back-to-back Olympic gold medal wins made her the first American boxer to win consecutive Olympic titles.

Her amateur boxing record was 77 wins (18 by knockout) and 1 loss.

== Professional boxing career ==
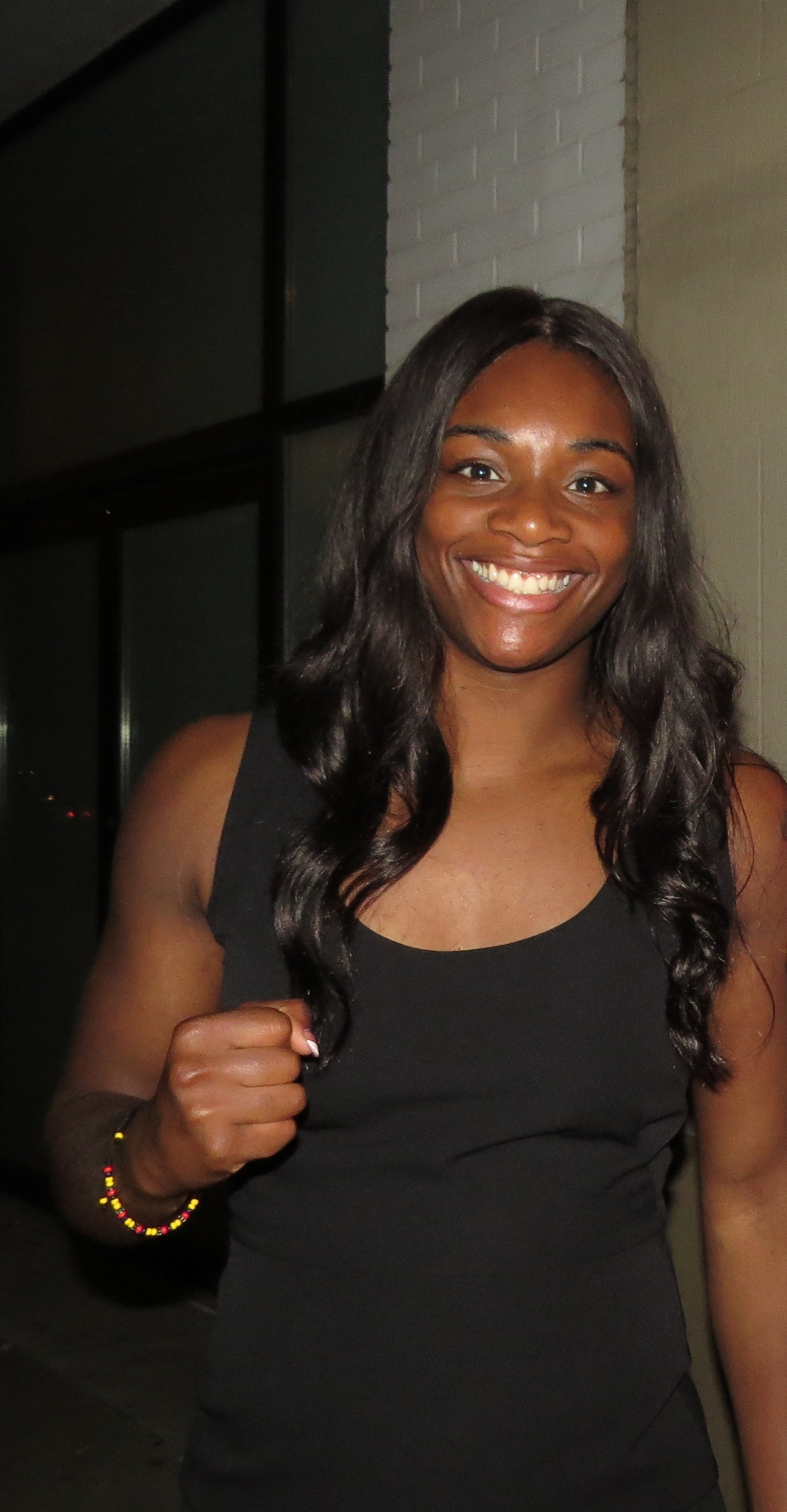
Claressa Shields in 2016

=== Early career ===
In November 2016, Shields officially went pro. She won her first match, against Franchón Crews-Dezurn, by unanimous decision.

On March 10, 2017, she faced Szilvia Szabados for the North American Boxing Federation middleweight title, and won by TKO. This was the main event on ShoBox, with a regional title fight between Antonio Nieves and Nikolai Potapov serving as the co-main event. It was the first time a women's boxing bout was the main event on a United States premium network card.

On June 16, 2017, Shields headlined the "Detroit Brawl," facing Sydney LeBlanc in her first scheduled eight-round bout. LeBlanc signed on with three days notice, after Mery Rancier dropped out due to visa issues. Shields won the bout by decision after all eight rounds.

=== Super middleweight champion ===
==== Shields vs. Adler ====
On August 4, 2017, Shields defeated defending champ Nikki Adler by 5th round TKO at the MGM Grand Detroit for the WBC super-middleweight belt and the vacant IBF super-middleweight belt. The ref had to jump in to protect the undefeated Adler. The fight was broadcast on Showtime.

==== Shields vs. Nelson ====
On January 12, 2018, Shields retained her WBC and IBF female super middleweight titles, and won the WBAN super-middleweight title by defeating 17-0 Tori Nelson. It was Shields' first time going all 10 rounds in her professional career.

=== Middleweight champion ===
==== Shields vs. Gabriel ====
On June 22, 2018, in just her sixth professional fight, Shields defeated Hanna Gabriel by unanimous decision to win the vacant WBA and inaugural IBF middleweight titles, breaking the record for becoming a two-weight world champion in the fewest professional bouts, previously held by Vasyl Lomachenko. During the first round, she suffered the first knockdown of her professional career. The bout marked her move down from 168 pounds to 160 and was her first fight under trainer John David Jackson, following her previous five bouts with Jason Crutchfield.

==== Shields vs. Hermans ====
On December 8, 2018, Shields' fight aired on HBO, her first appearance on the network, a fight which was a part of the last boxing card to occur on HBO. She faced Femke Hermans outboxing her all 10 rounds for a unanimous decision victory.

==== Shields vs. Hammer ====
On April 13, 2019, Shields became the undisputed women's middleweight world champion, unifying the WBA, WBC, IBF and WBO middleweight titles, along with The Ring magazine's inaugural middleweight belt, after defeating Christina Hammer by unanimous decision. The victory was a near shutout with two judges scoring the bout 98–91 while a third judge scored it 98–92.

=== Light middleweight champion ===
==== Shields vs. Habazin ====
Shields was scheduled to fight Ivana Habazin for the vacant WBO junior middleweight title in Flint, Michigan, on October 5, 2019. However, the fight was postponed due to Habazin's trainer being attacked at the weigh in. The fight eventually took place on January 10, 2020, with an all female ring (referee). The Atlantic boardwalk hall had a sold out Venue as Claressa won by unanimous decision, 99–89, 100–90 and 100–89, and became the fastest ever to win titles in 3 divisions male or female in history.

==== Shields vs. Dicaire ====
On March 5, 2021, Shields defeated Marie-Eve Dicaire by unanimous decision to retain her WBC and WBO super welterweight titles, claim IBF 154-pound belt, and vacant WBA light middleweight strap. With the win she became the first boxer in the four-belt era to hold undisputed titles in two weight classes, and the first female boxer to be an undisputed champion in two weight classes. This fight took place in Shields' hometown with a limited crowd due to the COVID-19 pandemic.

=== Return to middleweight ===
==== Shields vs. Kozin ====
Shields then faced Ema Kozin on February 5, 2022. She captured a unanimous decision with all referees scoring every round for her, and retained her WBA, WBC, IBF, and The Ring female middleweight titles meanwhile winning the WBF female middleweight title also.

==== Shields vs. Marshall ====
Shields was initially scheduled to face reigning WBO Middleweight Champion Savannah Marshall in a title unification bout on September 10, 2022. However, due to the death of Queen Elizabeth II the bout was postponed to take place on October 15, 2022.

On the night of the fight, Shields went the full 10-round distance against Marshall. According to CompuBox stats, Shields outlanded Marshall 175 to 136; landed significantly more jabs, 44 to 14; and landed more power, 131 to 122. Shields won via unanimous decision with two judges scoring the fight 97–93 and one scoring it 96–94, all in favor of Shields to become the undisputed middleweight world champion. This fight occurred at the O2 Arena and was the first time two female boxers headlined at a major venue in the United Kingdom. As well, the fight headlined the first all-female boxing card in the United Kingdom.

==== Shields vs. Cornejo ====
On June 3, 2023, Shields defeated Maricela Cornejo by unanimous decision at Little Caesars Arena in Detroit, Michigan to retain her undisputed middleweight title. After dominating from start to finish, the judges scored the bout 100-89, 100-90 and 100-90.

=== Light heavyweight and heavyweight champion ===
==== Shields vs. Lepage-Joanisse ====
Shields was scheduled to challenge Vanessa Lepage-Joanisse for her WBC heavyweight title at Little Caesars Arena in Detroit, MI on July 27, 2024. The bout was contested at 175 pounds with the vacant WBF heavyweight and WBO light heavyweight titles also on the line. Shields won the fight via second-round TKO, dropping Joanisse three times along the way.

=== Undisputed heavyweight champion ===
==== Shields vs. Perkins ====
On February 2, 2025, Shields faced Danielle Perkins for the undisputed heavyweight championship at Dort Financial Center in Flint, Michigan. She scored the fight's lone knockdown in the waning seconds of the tenth round and won the bout by unanimous decision with the judges scorecards reading 97-92, 99-90, and 100-89- all for Shields. Thanks to the victory, she became the only three-division undisputed champion, male or female, of the four-belt era, as well as the first female undisputed heavyweight champion ever.

Following her win over Perkins, Shields tested positive in competition for marijuana, but was eventually cleared of wrongdoing following receipt of evidence that a procedural error occurred.

On March 3, 2025, Shields opted to vacate her WBO light heavyweight title as the organization doesn’t allow their champions to hold belts in two divisions simultaneously.

==== Shields vs. Daniels ====
Shields defended her undisputed heavyweight title against Lani Daniels on July 26, 2025, in Detroit, MI. She defeated her by unanimous decision, outlanding Daniels 167–41 according to CompuBox. Daniels didn’t land a single punch in the first, second, and sixth rounds. The judges scored the bout 100–90, 99–91, and 99–91 all in favor of Shields.

==== Shields vs. Crews-Dezurn II ====
Shields defended her undisputed heavyweight title in a rematch against Franchón Crews-Dezurn on February 22, 2026, at the Little Caesars Arena in Detroit, MI. She won the bout by unanimous decision, taking every round on all three judges' scorecards, each of which read 100–90 in her favor. According to CompuBox, Shields outlanded Crews-Dezurn 226–106 in total punches.

=== Return to Middleweight ===
==== Shields vs. Scott ====
Shields was scheduled to challenge Kaye Scott for her unified WBA and WBC middleweight titles at State Farm Arena in Atlanta, Georgia, on August 15, 2026. She won the fight via technical knockout in the sixth round.

== Professional mixed martial arts career ==
In November 2020, Shields had signed a three-year contract with Professional Fighters League and was expected to make her mixed martial arts debut in 2021. Since Shields first announced that her MMA debut, she has also begun training in Brazilian Jiu-Jitsu and has gone to train under IBJJF no gi World Champion Roberto Alencar, alongside Holly Holm. She also started training at JacksonWink MMA in late 2020.

Shields made her MMA debut at PFL 4 on June 10, 2021, against Brittney Elkin. She won the fight via technical knockout in round three.

Her second bout was initially scheduled to take place on the PFL 9 event on August 27, 2021, against an opponent yet to be named. However, on July 12, 2021, news surfaced that her bout was rescheduled to take place on August 19, 2021, in order to garner more exposure at an ESPN-aired PFL 8 event. It was eventually rescheduled for PFL 10 on October 27, 2021, with Shields facing Abigail Montes. Shields lost the bout via split decision.

In August 2023, it was announced that Shields had re-signed a multi-year contract with Professional Fighters League to continue competing in mixed martial arts.

Shields faced Kelsey DeSantis on February 24, 2024, at PFL vs. Bellator. She was unable to make the appropriate weight for her fight with DeSantis, forcing her opponent to fight up two weight classes, with the bout taking place at 165 pounds. Shields won the bout via split decision. This was the first professional MMA bout in Saudi Arabia featuring two women.

On May 19, 2025, Shields announced her retirement from MMA.

== Personal life ==
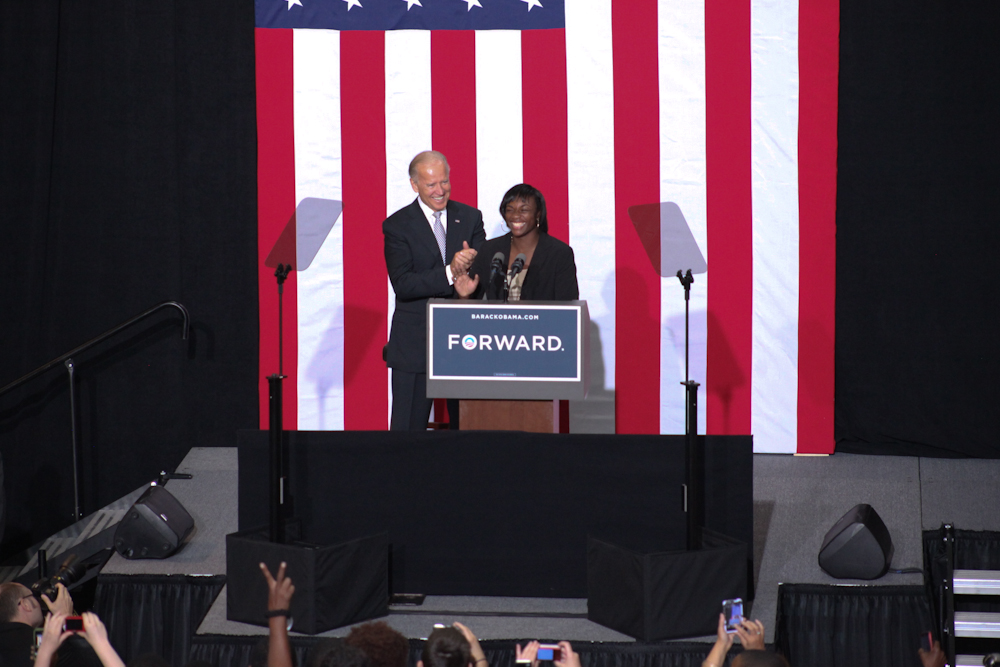
Shields and Vice President Joe Biden in 2012. Shields introduced Biden during a 2012 campaign stop in Michigan.

Shields is a Christian. She was baptized at age 13 (two years after she began boxing) and began attending a local church. After being sexually abused at an early age, she found strength in her Christian faith and eventually left home.

Shields is an ambassador for Up2Us Sports, a national non-profit organization dedicated to supporting underserved youth by providing them with coaches trained in positive youth development. She is also an ambassador for gender equality in sports, particularly boxing, which is under-covered by the media.

Shields attempted to adopt her cousin's daughter in 2014. In 2021, Shields followed a pescatarian diet. On June 19, 2022, her hometown city of Flint, Michigan renamed a street in her honor.

In 2024, Shields and Brooklyn rapper Papoose began dating. The pair went public with their relationship in 2025, after Papoose's estranged wife Remy Ma took to social media to confirm rumors of a romance between the two.

In November 2025, Shields signed a multi-fight deal with Salita Promotions and Wynn Records, earning herself a guaranteed minimum of $8 million.

== In popular culture ==
Shields is the subject of the 2015 documentary T-Rex: Her Fight for Gold which follows her dreams of being the first woman in history to win a gold medal in Olympic boxing.

In 2016, Universal Pictures, a division of Comcast, which holds Olympic broadcast rights in the United States, acquired the rights to produce a film about her life story, which was released in 2024 as The Fire Inside. Ryan Destiny portrays Shields in the film.

In 2016, Shields was slated to act in the Susan Seidelman-directed film Punch Me.

In July 2016, Shields appeared as a featured athlete in ESPN The Magazine's The Body Issue. In December, she became the third woman (Cathy Davis, Ronda Rousey) and second female boxer ever to grace the cover of The Ring magazine.

In 2018, Shields acted in a Walmart ad directed by Dee Rees.

== Professional boxing record ==
19 fights	19 wins	0 losses
By knockout	4	0
By decision	15	0

No.	Result	Record	Opponent	Type	Round, time	Date	Location	Notes
19	Win	19–0	Kaye Scott	TKO	6 (10), 1:38	Aug 15, 2026	State Farm Arena, Atlanta, Georgia, U.S.	Won WBA and WBC female middleweight titles
18	Win	18–0	Franchón Crews-Dezurn	UD	10	Feb 22, 2026	Little Caesars Arena, Detroit, Michigan, U.S.	Retained WBA, WBC, IBF, WBO, and WBF female heavyweight titles
17	Win	17–0	Lani Daniels	UD	10	Jul 26, 2025	Little Caesars Arena, Detroit, Michigan, U.S.	Retained WBA, WBC, IBF, WBO, and WBF female heavyweight titles
16	Win	16–0	Danielle Perkins	UD	10	Feb 2, 2025	Dort Financial Center, Flint, Michigan	Retained WBC and WBF female heavyweight titles; Won vacant IBF and inaugural WBO and WBA female heavyweight titles
15	Win	15–0	Vanessa Lepage-Joanisse	TKO	2 (10), 1:09	Jul 27, 2024	Little Caesars Arena, Detroit, Michigan, U.S.	Won WBC, and vacant WBF female heavyweight titles; Won WBO female light heavyweight title
14	Win	14–0	Maricela Cornejo	UD	10	Jun 3, 2023	Little Caesars Arena, Detroit, Michigan, U.S.	Retained WBA, WBC, IBF, WBO, WBF, and The Ring female middleweight titles
13	Win	13–0	Savannah Marshall	UD	10	Oct 15, 2022	The O2 Arena, London, England	Retained WBA, WBC, IBF, WBF, and The Ring female middleweight titles; Won WBO female middleweight title
12	Win	12–0	Ema Kozin	UD	10	Feb 5, 2022	Motorpoint Arena Cardiff, Cardiff, Wales	Retained WBA, WBC, IBF, and The Ring female middleweight titles; Won WBF female middleweight title
11	Win	11–0	Marie-Eve Dicaire	UD	10	Mar 5, 2021	Dort Federal Event Center, Flint, Michigan, U.S.	Retained WBC and WBO light middleweight titles; Won IBF, vacant WBA (Super), and inaugural The Ring female light middleweight titles
10	Win	10–0	Ivana Habazin	UD	10	Jan 10, 2020	Ocean Casino Resort, Atlantic City, New Jersey, U.S.	Won vacant WBC and WBO female light middleweight titles
9	Win	9–0	Christina Hammer	UD	10	Apr 13, 2019	Boardwalk Hall, Atlantic City, New Jersey, U.S.	Retained WBA, WBC, and IBF female middleweight titles; Won WBO and inaugural The Ring female middleweight titles
8	Win	8–0	Femke Hermans	UD	10	Dec 8, 2018	StubHub Center, Carson, California, U.S.	Retained WBA, WBC, and IBF female middleweight titles
7	Win	7–0	Hannah Rankin	UD	10	Nov 17, 2018	Kansas Star Arena, Mulvane, Kansas, U.S.	Retained WBA and IBF female middleweight titles; Won vacant WBC female middleweight title
6	Win	6–0	Hanna Gabriels	UD	10	Jun 22, 2018	Masonic Temple, Detroit, Michigan, U.S.	Won vacant WBA and inaugural IBF female middleweight titles
5	Win	5–0	Tori Nelson	UD	10	Jan 12, 2018	Turning Stone Resort Casino, Verona, New York, U.S.	Retained WBC and IBF female super middleweight titles; Won WBAN lineal super middleweight title
4	Win	4–0	Nikki Adler	TKO	5 (10), 1:34	Aug 4, 2017	MGM Grand, Detroit, Michigan, U.S.	Won WBC and inaugural IBF female super middleweight titles
3	Win	3–0	Sydney LeBlanc	UD	8	Jun 16, 2017	Masonic Temple, Detroit, Michigan, U.S.	Won vacant WBC Silver female super middleweight title
2	Win	2–0	Szilvia Szabados	TKO	4 (6), 1:30	Mar 10, 2017	MGM Grand, Detroit, Michigan, U.S.	Won vacant NABF female middleweight title
1	Win	1–0	Franchón Crews-Dezurn	UD	4	Nov 19, 2016	T-Mobile Arena, Paradise, Nevada, U.S.	

== Mixed martial arts record ==
Professional record breakdown
3 matches	2 wins	1 loss
By knockout	1	0
By decision	1	1

Res.	Record	Opponent	Method	Event	Date	Round	Time	Location	Notes
Win	2–1	Kelsey DeSantis	Decision (split)	PFL vs. Bellator	February 24, 2024	3	5:00	Riyadh, Saudi Arabia	Super Lightweight (165 lb) bout.
Loss	1–1	Abigail Montes	Decision (split)	PFL 10 (2021)	October 27, 2021	3	5:00	Hollywood, Florida, United States	
Win	1–0	Brittney Elkin	TKO (punches)	PFL 4 (2021)	June 10, 2021	3	1:44	Atlantic City, New Jersey, United States	Lightweight debut.

== Titles in boxing ==
=== Major world titles ===
- WBA (Super) light middleweight champion (154 lbs)
- WBC light middleweight champion (154 lbs)
- IBF light middleweight champion (154 lbs)
- WBO light middleweight champion (154 lbs)
- WBA middleweight champion (160 lbs) (2×)
- WBC middleweight champion (160 lbs) (2×)
- IBF middleweight champion (160 lbs)
- WBO middleweight champion (160 lbs) (2×)
- WBC super middleweight champion (168 lbs)
- IBF super middleweight champion (168 lbs)
- WBO light heavyweight champion (175 lbs)
- WBA heavyweight champion (175+ lbs)
- WBC heavyweight champion (175+ lbs)
- IBF heavyweight champion (175+ lbs)
- WBO heavyweight champion (175+ lbs)

=== The Ring magazine titles ===
- The Ring Light middleweight champion (154 lbs)
- The Ring middleweight champion (160 lbs)

=== Silver world titles ===
- WBC Silver super middleweight champion (168 lbs)

=== Minor world titles ===
- WBF middleweight champion (160 lbs)
- WBF heavyweight champion (175+ lbs)

=== Regional titles ===
- NABF middleweight champion (160 lbs)

=== Lineal titles ===
- Lineal light middleweight champion (154 lbs)
- Lineal middleweight champion (160 lbs)
- WBAN lineal super middleweight champion (168 lbs)
- The Baddest Woman On The Planet (154 lbs – Heavyweight)

=== Undisputed titles ===
- Undisputed light middleweight champion (154 lbs)
- Undisputed middleweight champion (160 lbs) (2×)
- Undisputed heavyweight champion (175+ lbs)

=== Honorary titles ===
- WBC Diamond middleweight champion
- WBC Elizabethan champion
- WBO Super Champion

== Awards and honors ==
- 2011 National PAL Championships Most Outstanding Female Fighter
- 2012 U.S. Olympic Trials Outstanding Boxer of the Tournament
- August 29, 2012 is declared "Claressa Shields Day" in Flint, Michigan
- 2012 Key to the City of Flint, Michigan
- 2013 AIBA Youth Woman Boxer of the Year
- 2013 WBAN Top Amateur (Youth) Elite Boxer of the Year
- 2014 WBAN Top Amateur Boxer of the Year
- 2015 USA Boxing Female Athlete of the Year
- 2016 Outstanding Boxer of the World Championships
- 2016 Olympics Val Barker Trophy
- 2016 Women's Sports Foundation Sportswoman of the Year
- 2017 Nickelodeon Kids' Choice Sports Award for "Biggest Powerhouse."
- 2017 USA Today Female Fighter of the Year
- 2017 Yahoo Sports Female Fighter of the Year
- 2017 Women Boxing Archive Network (WBAN) Hottest Rising Star in Boxing
- In January 2018, her boxing gloves were enshrined in the International Boxing Hall of Fame
- In 2018, Shields was inducted into the USA Boxing Alumni Association's Hall of Fame
- 2018 The Ring Female Fighter of the Year and Fight of the Year
- 2018 WBAN Fighter of the Year
- 2018 Boxing Writers Association of America Female Fighter of the Year
- April 27, 2019 is declared "Claressa Shields Day" in Flint, Michigan
- 2019 Women's Sports Foundation Sportswoman of the Year
- In December 2019, she was named Sporting News' Female Boxer of the Decade
- 2020 BET Award for Sportswoman of the Year Nominee
- 2021 BET Award for Sportswoman of the Year Nominee
- March 2021 WBA Female Boxer of the Month
- 2021 ESPN Mid-Year Awards Best Female Fighter
- February 2022 WBA Fighter of the Month
- 2022 Boxing Writers Association of America Female Fighter of the Year
- 2022 ESPN Women's Fighter of the Year
- 2022 WBA Female Fighter of the Year
- 2022 Sporting News Women's Boxer of the Year
- 2022 WBAN Fighter of the Year
- 2023 Women's Sports Foundation Sportswoman of the Year
- In 2023, Shields became the first woman to win the Best Boxer ESPY Award
- 2024 WBC Performance of the Year against Vanessa Lepage-Joanisse
- In 2025, Shields was inducted into the Michigan Sports Hall of Fame.
- 2026 Best Fighter ESPY Award Nominee
- August 15, 2026 is declared "Claressa The GWOAT Shields Appreciation Day" in Atlanta, Georgia
- 2026 Champion of Champions Award by the All Women's Sports Network at the VEON: Women Who Win Awards ceremony

== See also ==
- Women's boxing
- List of female boxers
- List of Olympic medalists in boxing § Women's
- List of current female world boxing champions
- List of female undisputed world boxing champions
- List of boxing triple champions § List of women's triple champions
- List of boxing quadruple champions § List of women’s quadruple champion
- List of boxing quintuple champions § List of women's quintuple champion
- List of female mixed martial artists
- List of mixed martial artists with professional boxing records
- List of multi-sport athletes

Sporting positions
Regional boxing titles
Inaugural champion	NABF female middleweight champion March 10, 2017 – August 2017; Vacated	Vacant Title next held by Raquel Miller
Minor world boxing titles
New title	WBC Silver female super middleweight champion June 16, 2017 – August 4, 2017; Won world title	Vacant
Preceded by Ema Kozin	WBF female middleweight champion February 5, 2022 – present	Incumbent
Vacant	WBF female heavyweight champion July 27, 2024 – present	Incumbent
Major world boxing titles
Preceded by Nikki Adler	WBC female super middleweight champion August 4, 2017 – September 2018; Vacated	Vacant Title next held by Franchón Crews-Dezurn
Inaugural champion	IBF female super middleweight champion August 4, 2017 – June 2018; Vacated	Vacant Title next held by Elin Cederroos
Vacant Title last held by Teresa Perozzi	WBA female middleweight champion June 22, 2018 – 2024; Vacated	Vacant
Inaugural champion	IBF female middleweight champion June 22, 2018 – 2024; Vacated	Vacant Title next held by Desley Robinson
Vacant Title last held by Christina Hammer	WBC female middleweight champion November 17, 2018 – 2024; Vacated	Vacant Title next held by Desley Robinson
Preceded by Christina Hammer	WBO female middleweight champion April 13, 2019 – September 16, 2020	Vacant Title next held by Savannah Marshall
Inaugural champion	The Ring female middleweight champion April 13, 2019 – present	Incumbent
Inaugural champion	Undisputed female middleweight champion April 13, 2019 – September 16, 2020; Titles fragmented	Vacant Title next held by Herself
Vacant Title last held by Ewa Piątkowska	WBC light middleweight champion January 10, 2020 – November 26, 2021	Vacant Title next held by Patricia Berghult
Vacant Title last held by Hanna Gabriels	WBO light middleweight champion January 10, 2020 – November 26, 2021; Vacated	Vacant Title next held by Natasha Jonas
Inaugural champion	WBA (Super) light middleweight champion March 5, 2021 – December 3, 2021; Vacated	Vacant Title next held by Hannah Rankin
Preceded by Marie-Eve Dicaire	IBF light middleweight champion March 5, 2021 – December 3, 2021; Vacated	Vacant Title next held by Marie-Eve Dicaire
Inaugural champion	The Ring female light middleweight champion March 5, 2021 – December 3, 2021; Vacated	Vacant Title next held by Natasha Jonas
Inaugural champion	Undisputed female light middleweight champion March 5, 2021 – November 26, 2021; Titles fragmented	Vacant
Preceded by Savannah Marshall	WBO female middleweight champion October 15, 2022 – 2024; Vacated	Vacant Title next held by Desley Robinson
Vacant Title last held by Herself	Undisputed female middleweight champion October 15, 2022 – 2024; Titles fragmented	Vacant
Vacant Title last held by Geovana Peres	WBO female light heavyweight champion July 27, 2024 – March 3, 2025; Vacated	Vacant
Preceded by Vanessa Lepage-Joanisse	WBC female heavyweight champion July 27, 2024 – present	Incumbent
Inaugural champion	WBA female heavyweight champion February 2, 2025 – present	Incumbent
Vacant Title last held by Lani Daniels	IBF female heavyweight champion February 2, 2025 – present	Incumbent
Inaugural champion	WBO female heavyweight champion February 2, 2025 – present	Incumbent
Inaugural champion	Undisputed female heavyweight champion February 2, 2025 – present	Incumbent
Awards
Previous: Cecilia Brækhus	BWAA Female Fighter of the Year; 2018	Succeeded by Katie Taylor
Preceded by Amanda Serrano	BWAA Female Fighter of the Year; 2022	Succeeded by Amanda Serrano
Records
Preceded by Vasyl Lomachenko; 7	Fewest professional fights to win a major world title in two weight classes 6 June 22, 2018 – present	Incumbent
Preceded by Vasyl Lomachenko; 12	Fewest professional fights to win a major world title in three weight classes 10; January 10, 2020 – present	Incumbent
Preceded by Naoko Fujioka; 18	Fewest professional fights to win a major world title in four weight classes 15; July 27, 2024 – present	Incumbent
Preceded by Naoko Fujioka; 19	Fewest professional fights to win a major world title in five weight classes 15; July 27, 2024 – present	Incumbent
