= Nikki Adler =

Croatian-German boxer (born 1987)

Personal information
- Nationality: Croatian-German
- Born: Nikolina Orlović; April 2, 1987 (age 39) Augsburg, West Germany
- Height: 173 cm (5 ft 8 in)
- Weight: Middleweight

Boxing career
- Stance: Orthodox

Boxing record
- Total fights: 18
- Wins: 16
- Win by KO: 9
- Losses: 2
Medal record
Women's Boxing
Representing Croatia
European Union Championships
Bronze medal – third place	2008 Liverpool	70 kg

Nikki Adler (born Nikolina Orlović; April 2, 1987) is a Croatian-German professional boxer. She held the WBC female super-middleweight title from 2013 to 2017.

== Amateur career ==
At the age of 15, Nikki Adler, then still Nikolina Orlović, started kickboxing. There she quickly showed her great talent, so that she could successfully fight her first fight after only a few weeks. This was followed by two third places at the German Championships and the Bavarian Championships. At the same time, she took part in the German boxing championship in 2004, which she was able to decide immediately.

Nikki Adler then completed an education at Deutsche Post AG alongside her amateur career.

In 2007, the left-back took the boxing training again and, after a short training period, again took part in the German Championships, which she was able to win. For Croatia, from then on, she has been an international player since she was not a German national. Under the former Ukrainian national Borys Raytman she developed steadily further. She regularly took part in German, European and World Championships.

After receiving the German nationality, she was suspended by the AIBA for 3 years, which prevented a start in the German national team and finally led her to decide for a career with the pros.

Amateur boxing record: 30 fights, 24 wins, 1 draw

Amateurs: World Championships 2008 (5th place), European Union Championship 2008 (3rd place), International German Champion (2004, 2007, 2008, 2009, 2010), Croatian Champion 2008

In the final of the German championship 2008, she defeated future middleweight boxing world champion, Christina Hammer.

== Professional career ==
In 2010, Adler became a professional at the Wiking Box Team in Berlin. Under coach Hartmut Schröder, she became German champion in May 2011 by a knockout victory in the second round against Danijela Bickei and already in November of the same year, the European champion of the WIBF by a point victory after 10 rounds against the Karlsruherin Pia Porter.

In 2012 the cooperation with Wiking ended. She then coached the coaches team Thommy Wiedemann and Bernd Fernengel in Ulm until 2014.

In January 2013, she became WIBA world champion by a unanimous point win against Edita Karabeg. In May 2013, with a victory over Zane Brige from Latvia, the second World Championship title followed, this time after the WBF version. The fight took place in Volgodonsk, Russia. She won the WBC title in November 2013 in a fight against Zane Brige over 10 rounds after unanimous decision in Grozny. It was the first women's boxing match in Chechnya.

In May 2014, Nikki Adler defended her WIBA title in Krasnodar, Russia against Gifty Amanua Ankrah. In September 2014, Adler again celebrated a victory in Holzminden by K.O. against Rita Kenessey.

In 2015 Adler focused on the defense of her WBC title in a gripping battle against Szilvia Szabados in the MHPArena Ludwigsburg. Adler won by a unanimous decision. Her next challenger was Elene Sikmashvili. Adler defeated the Georgian in Saarbrücken in July 2016 by knockout and remains the reigning and undefeated world champion in the super middleweight division. On August 4, 2017 Adler was defeated by Claressa Shields and lost her WBC title.

== Professional boxing record ==
18 fights	16 wins	2 losses
By knockout	9	1
By decision	7	1

No.	Result	Record	Opponent	Type	Round, time	Date	Location	Notes
18	Loss	16–2	(Belgium) Femke Hermans	UD	10	12 May 2018	Eisstadion, Augsburg, Germany	For vacant WBO female super-middleweight title
17	Loss	16–1	(United States) Claressa Shields	TKO	5 (10), 1:34	4 Aug 2017	(United States) MGM Grand, Detroit, Michigan, US	Lost WBC female super-middleweight title; For vacant IBF female super-middleweight title
16	Win	16–0	(Dominican Republic) Mery Rancier	UD	10	11 Mar 2017	Friedrich-Ebert-Halle, Ludwigshafen, Germany	Won vacant WIBF and vacant GBU female super-middleweight titles
15	Win	15–0	(Georgia (country)) Elene Sikmashvili	KO	9 (10), 0:41	15 Jul 2016	Saarlandhalle, Saarbrücken, Germany	Retained WBC female super-middleweight title
14	Win	14–0	(Hungary) Szilvia Szabados	UD	10	17 Jul 2015	MHPArena, Ludwigsburg, Germany	Retained WBC female super-middleweight title
13	Win	13–0	(Hungary) Rita Kennesy	KO	4 (10), 0:35	20 Sep 2014	Stadthalle, Holzminden, Germany	
12	Win	12–0	(Ghana) Gifty Amanua Ankrah	RTD	8 (10), 2:00	23 May 2014	Basket Hall, Krasnodar, Russia	Retained Women's IBA super-middleweight title
11	Win	11–0	(Latvia) Zane Brige	UD	10	30 Nov 2013	Olympic Sports Complex, Grozny, Russia	Won vacant WBC female super-middleweight title; Retained WBF female super-middleweight title
10	Win	10–0	(Latvia) Zane Brige	UD	10	25 May 2013	Olymp, Volgodonsk, Russia	Won vacant WBF female super-middleweight title
9	Win	9–0	(Bosnia and Herzegovina) Edita Lesnik	UD	10	12 Jan 2013	Neu-Ulm, Germany	Won vacant Women's IBA super-middleweight title
8	Win	8–0	(Serbia) Emeke Halasz	KO	4 (10), 0:53	14 Jul 2012	Augsburg, Germany	
7	Win	7–0	(Germany) Pia Porter	PTS	10	15 Oct 2011	Ofen Stadthalle, Velten, Germany	
6	Win	6–0	(Germany) Jana Kluge	TKO	2 (6)	19 Aug 2011	Business Center, Leipzig, Germany	
5	Win	5–0	(Serbia) Daniela Bickei	KO	2 (10)	27 May 2011	Alte Brauerei, Stralsund, Germany	
4	Win	4–0	(Germany) Tamar Rubin	KO	2 (4)	26 Feb 2011	Inselhalle, Brandenburg, Germany	
3	Win	3–0	(Latvia) Zane Brige	PTS	6	12 Feb 2011	Boxsporthalle Braamkamp, Hamburg, Germany	
2	Win	2–0	(Germany) Tanja Viehweg	TKO	2 (6)	22 Jan 2011	Altes Funkwerk, Berlin, Germany	
1	Win	1–0	(Germany) Mavira Leshan	TKO	1 (4), 1:15	11 Dec 2010	Altes Funkwerk, Berlin, Germany	
