= Hanna Gabriels =

Costa Rican boxer

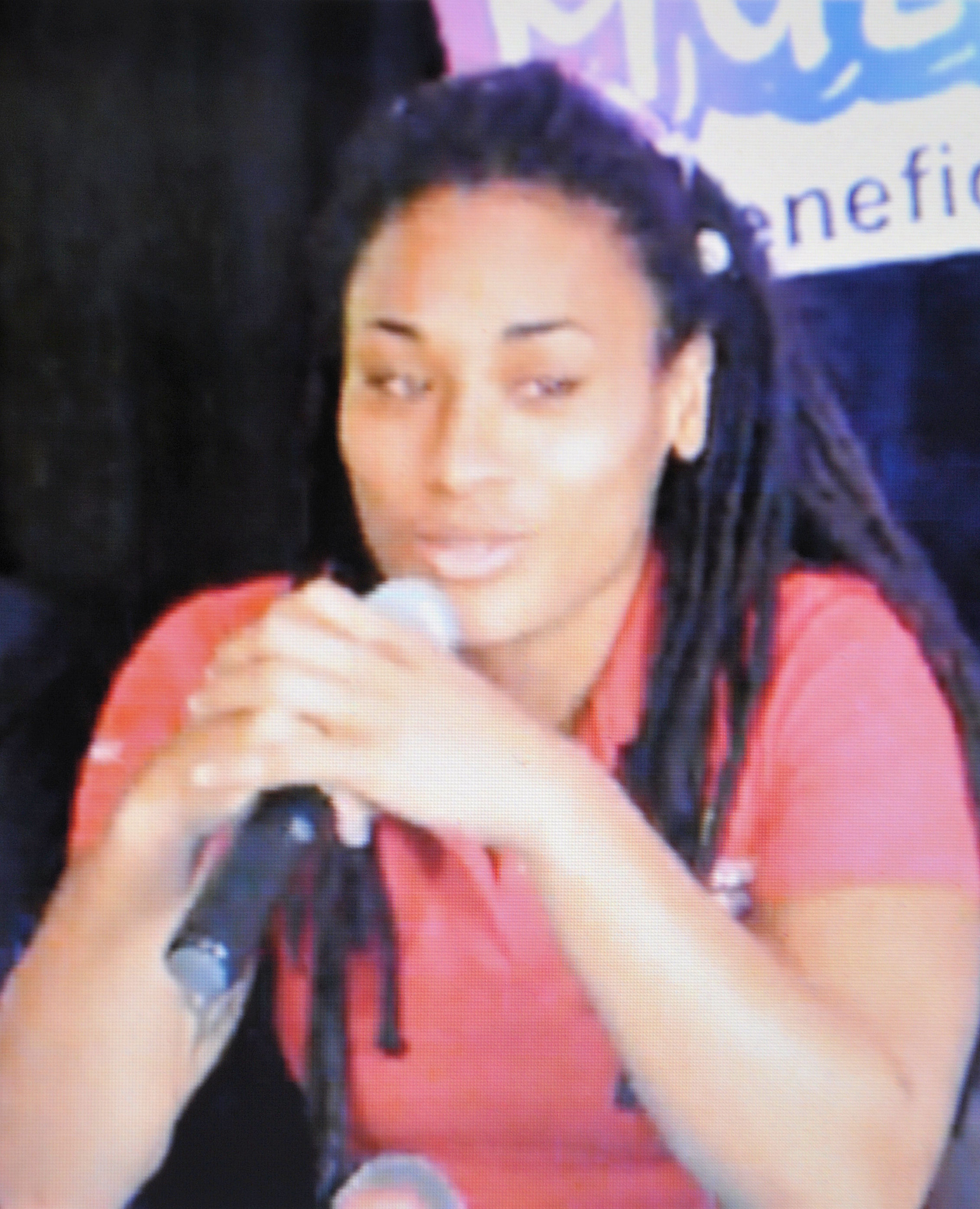
- Gabriel in 2010

Personal information
- Nickname: La Amazona / Black
- Born: Hanna Gabriels Valle; 14 January 1983 (age 43) Alajuela, Costa Rica
- Height: 5 ft 6 in (168 cm)

Boxing career
- Weight class: Welterweight; Light middleweight; Middleweight; Light heavyweight; Heavyweight
- Reach: 68 in (173 cm)
- Stance: Orthodox

Boxing record
- Total fights: 24
- Wins: 21
- Win by KO: 12
- Losses: 2
- Draws: 1

Hanna Gabriels Valle (born 14 January 1983) is a Costa Rican professional boxer. She has held world championships in four weight classes, having held the WBA female light middleweight title since 2016; the WBA female light heavyweight and WBC female heavyweight titles since April 2021; (Note: The WBC's highest weight limit is 168 lbs+ (heavyweight), the WBA's is 175 lbs (light heavyweight). Gabriels vs. Gaytán was fought at 175 lbs, making her eligible for both titles.) the WBO welterweight title in 2009; and the WBO light middleweight title twice between 2010 and 2018. As of September 2020, she is ranked as the world's third best active light middleweight by The Ring and BoxRec.

Gabriels is the daughter of Yolanda Valle Moreno and Lesslie Gabriels Binns, a promising boxer who qualified for the Olympic Games in Moscow 1980, but was unable to attend. She has one brother, Windell, who played football in the Costa Rican Primera División.

== Professional career ==
Gabriels made her professional debut on 17 November 2007, against Nicaraguan Aoska Xochilet Herrera at the Gimnasio Nacional, San José, Costa Rica, winning by third-round technical knockout (TKO).

On 19 December 2009, Gabriels fought for the vacant WBO welterweight title against Argentine Gabriela Zapata at the Dennis Martínez National Stadium, Managua, Nicaragua, winning by TKO in the fourth round. The event and was part of an evening of posthumous tribute to three-weight Nicaraguan world champion Alexis Arguello, El Flaco Explosivo, considered one of the greatest boxers of all time.

On 14 January 2010, just over a month after capturing the WBO welterweight title, Gabriels relinquished the belt after suffering several blackouts - said to be caused by having to cut-weight in order to make the welterweight limit.

On 29 May 2010, Gabriels moved up in weight to face Dominican Gardy Álvarez for the vacant WBO junior middleweight title at the Coliseo Rubén Rodríguez, Bayamón, Puerto Rico, winning by first-round TKO in a fight that lasted only 11 seconds.

On 11 January 2011, Gabriels successfully defended her title against American Melisenda Pérez, winning by TKO in the tenth-round. Her cousin Andrés Calderón was present for the fight and was noted as part of her motivation to win in a following interview.

On 31 March 2011, Gabriels once again fought Melisenda Pérez, this time winning with a seventh-round TKO. With 14,000 in attendance, the event was part of the inauguration acts of the National Stadium of Costa Rica.

On 28 February 2013, Gabriels suffered her first career loss via second-round TKO to Oxandia Castillo of the Dominican Republic, losing her unbeaten streak and WBO junior middleweight title.

On 20 December 2014, after nearly two years out of the ring, Gabriels once again fought for the vacant WBO junior middleweight title against Mexican Paty Ramirez, regaining her title with a second-round TKO.

On 18 June 2016, Gabriels fought Katia Alvariño of Uruguay, winning by TKO in the third round, capturing the vacant WBA super welterweight title and becoming a unified world champion.

Gabriels defended the unified light middleweight championship twice in 2017; On 27 May, she won a unanimous decision over Canadian Natasha Spence, and on 13 October, avenged her first career loss against Oxandia Castillo by unanimous decision.

On 22 June 2018, Gabriels moved up in weight for the third time to challenge two-time Olympic gold medalist Claressa Shields for the vacant WBA and inaugural IBF middleweight titles at the Masonic Temple, Detroit. After becoming the first fighter to knock Shields down, Gabriels lost a 10 round unanimous decision (91-98, 92-97, 92-97).

Gabriels was scheduled to fight against Claressa Shields in a rematch of their 2018 fight on 3 June 2023 but the fight was cancelled after Gabriels tested positive for a banned substance. Gabriels promoter claimed it entered her system when she was medicating her dog.

== Activism ==
In July 2019, Gabriels acknowledged in an interview that she suffered sexual abuse at age five as part of an effort to raise awareness about the issue. She is an activist for gender equity and against violence. That same year Gabriels was appointed by the United Nations High Commissioner for Refugees as a special collaborator to help campaigns for refugees and against xenophobia.

== Professional boxing record ==
| 24 fights | 21 wins | 2 losses |
|---|---|---|
| By knockout | 12 | 1 |
| By decision | 9 | 1 |
| Draws | 1 | |

| No. | Result | Record | Opponent | Type | Round, time | Date | Location | Notes |
|---|---|---|---|---|---|---|---|---|
| 24 | Win | 21–2–1 | (Mexico) Martha Gaytán | TKO | 2 (10), 1:59 | 17 Apr 2021 | Fiesta Casino, San José, Costa Rica | Won inaugural WBA female light heavyweight and vacant WBC female heavyweight titles |
| 23 | Win | 20–2–1 | (Argentina) Abril Vidal | UD | 10 | 17 Jul 2019 | Gimnasio Nacional, San José, Costa Rica | Retained WBA female light middleweight title |
| 22 | Win | 19–2–1 | (Australia) Sarah Dwyer | UD | 10 | 26 Jan 2019 | Managua, Nicaragua | Retained WBA female light middleweight title |
| 21 | Lose | 18–2–1 | (United States) Claressa Shields | UD | 10 | 22 Jun 2018 | (United States) Masonic Temple, Detroit, Michigan, U.S. | For vacant WBA and inaugural IBF female middleweight titles |
| 20 | Win | 18–1–1 | (Dominican Republic) Oxandia Castillo | UD | 10 | 13 Oct 2017 | Gimnasio Nacional Eddy Cortés, San José, Costa Rica | Retained WBA and WBO female light middleweight titles |
| 19 | Win | 17–1–1 | (Canada) Natasha Spence | UD | 10 | 27 May 2017 | BN Arena, Hatillo, Costa Rica | Retained WBA and WBO female light middleweight titles |
| 18 | Win | 16–1–1 | (Uruguay) Katia Alvariño | TKO | 3 (10), 1:28 | 18 Jun 2016 | Polideportivo José María Vargas, La Guaira, Venezuela | Retained WBO female light middleweight title; Won vacant WBA female light middleweight title |
| 17 | Win | 15–1–1 | (United States) Kali Reis | UD | 10 | 17 Oct 2015 | Estadio Edgardo Baltodano Briceño, Liberia, Costa Rica | Retained WBO female light middleweight title |
| 16 | Win | 14–1–1 | (Mexico) Paty Ramirez | TKO | 2 (10), 0:36 | 20 Dec 2014 | El San Juan Resort and Casino, Carolina, Puerto Rico | Won vacant WBO female light middleweight title |
| 15 | Lose | 13–1–1 | (Dominican Republic) Oxandia Castillo | TKO | 2 (10), 2:45 | 28 Feb 2013 | Estadio Ricardo Saprissa Aymá, San Juan de Tibás, Costa Rica | Lost WBO female light middleweight title |
| 14 | Win | 13–0–1 | (United States) Dakota Stone | TKO | 8 (10) | 7 Jan 2012 | Palacio de los Deportes, Heredia, Costa Rica | Retained WBO female light middleweight title |
| 13 | Win | 12–0–1 | (United States) Melisenda Pérez | TKO | 7 (10), 1:18 | 31 Mar 2011 | Estadio Nacional, San José, Costa Rica | Retained WBO female light middleweight title |
| 12 | Win | 11–0–1 | (United States) Melisenda Pérez | TKO | 10 (10), 1:04 | 9 Jan 2011 | Hotel & Casino Conrad, Punta del Este, Uruguay | Retained WBO female light middleweight title |
| 11 | Win | 10–0–1 | (Dominican Republic) Gardy Pena Alvarez | TKO | 1 (10), 0:40 | 29 May 2010 | Coliseo Rubén Rodríguez, Bayamón, Puerto Rico | Won inaugural WBO female light middleweight title |
| 10 | Win | 9–0–1 | (Argentina) Gabriela Marcela Zapata | KO | 4 (10), 1:01 | 19 Dec 2009 | Estadio Nacional, Managua, Nicaragua | Won inaugural WBO female welterweight title |
| 9 | Win | 8–0–1 | (United States) Yvonne Reis | UD | 6 | 26 Sep 2009 | (United States Virgin Islands) UVI Sports & Fitness Center, Charlotte Amalie, U.S. Virgin Islands | |
| 8 | Win | 7–0–1 | (Mexico) Nayeli Vazquez | UD | 9 | 18 Apr 2009 | Gimnasio Nº 1 de La Sabana, San José, Costa Rica | |
| 7 | Win | 6–0–1 | (Mexico) Irasema Valerio | KO | 1 (8), 0:46 | 12 Dec 2008 | Gimnasio Nº 1 de La Sabana, San José, Costa Rica | |
| 6 | Win | 5–0–1 | (Mexico) Nayeli Vazquez | UD | 8 | 15 Nov 2008 | Gimnasio Villa Olímpica, Desamparados, Costa Rica | |
| 5 | Draw | 4–0–1 | (United States) Rachel Clark | MD | 6 | 13 Sep 2008 | Expo Pocosí, Limón, Costa Rica | |
| 4 | Win | 4–0 | (Dominican Republic) Wanda Pena Ozuna | KO | 1 (4), 0:20 | 23 Aug 2008 | Gimnasio Nº 1 de La Sabana, San José, Costa Rica | |
| 3 | Win | 3–0 | (United States) Cristy Nickel | UD | 4 | 5 Jul 2008 | Gimnasio Nº 1 de La Sabana, San José, Costa Rica | |
| 2 | Win | 2–0 | (Dominican Republic) Evelina Diaz | KO | 3 (10), 0:49 | 16 Feb 2008 | Gimnasio Nacional Eddy Cortés, San José, Costa Rica | |
| 1 | Win | 1–0 | (Nicaragua) Aoska Xochilet Herrera | TKO | 3 (4), 0:10 | 17 Nov 2007 | Gimnasio Nacional Eddy Cortés, San José, Costa Rica | |

== Notes ==
Sporting positions
World boxing titles
| Inaugural champion | WBO female welterweight champion 19 December 2009 – 2010; Vacated | Vacant Title next held by Cecilia Brækhus |
| Inaugural champion | WBO female light-middleweight champion 29 May 2010 – 28 February 2013 | Succeeded by Oxandia Castillo |
| Vacant Title last held by Oxandia Castillo | WBO female light-middleweight champion 20 December 2014 – June 2018; Vacated | Vacant Title next held by Claressa Shields |
| Vacant Title last held by Layla McCarter | WBA female light-middleweight champion 18 June 2016 – present | Incumbent |
| Inaugural champion | WBA female light heavyweight champion 17 April 2021 – present | Incumbent |
| Vacant Title last held by Alejandra Jimenez | WBC female heavyweight champion 17 April 2021 – present | Incumbent |
