= Boxing in the 2020s =

Boxing in the 2020s is a list of notable fights and events in boxing during the decade from the year 2020 to 2029.

== Lists of notable fights and events by year ==
=== 2020 ===
==== January ====
- January 8 – Claressa Shields defeats Ivana Habazin by unanimous-decision to vacant WBC & WBO light middleweight titles
- January 18 – Jeison Roasrio knocked out Julian Williams in the 5th round to win the WBA (Super), IBF, and IBO light middleweight titles.

==== February ====
- February 8 – Terri Harper defeats Eva Wahlström by unanimous decision to win the WBC super-featherweight title
- February 8 – Gary Russell Jr. defeated Tugstsogt Nyambayar by unanimous decision to retain his WBC featherweight title
- February 15 – Caleb Plant successfully defended his IBF Super Middleweight title defeating Vincent Feigenbutz in the 10th round by technical knockout when the referee waived off the fight.
- February 22 – In the second part of what became a trilogy, Tyson Fury defeated Deontay Wilder in the 7th round when Wilder's corner threw in the towel, winning the WBC Heavyweight Title and then-vacant The Ring heavyweight title

==== March ====
- March 7 – Robert Helenius defeated Adam Kownacki in the 4th round by technical knockout to win the vacant WBA Gold heavyweight title

==== July ====
- July 7 – Vergil Ortiz Jr. defeats Samuel Vargas by 7th-round TKO

==== August ====
- August 1 – Angelo Leo defeated Tramaine Williams by unanimous decision to win the vacant WBO Junior Featherweight title
- August 7 – Terri Harper retained her WBC super-featherweight title in a controversial draw with Natasha Jonas.
- August 8 – Jamal James defeated Thomas Dulorme by unanimous decision to win the vacant WBA interim welterweight title
- August 15 – Jessica McCaskill defeats Cecilia Braekhus to become undisputed welterweight champion
- August 22 – Alexander Povetkin scored an upset 5th round knockout victory over Dillian Whyte to win the WBC interim heavyweight championship despite being knocked down in the 4th round
- August 22 – Katie Taylor defeats Delfine Persoon by unanimous decision in their rematch
- August 22 – Shawn Porter defeated Sebastian Formella by unanimous decision to win the vacant WBC Silver welterweight title
- August 29 – Erislandy Lara defeated Greg Vendetti by unanimous decision to retain the WBA (Regular) Light Middleweight title and win the vacant IBO Light Middleweight title

==== September ====
- September 26 – Juan Carlos Payano fought former champion Daniel Roman, who was ranked No. 3 by Ring Magazine, WBA and WBC and No. 4 by the WBO and No. 6 at super bantamweight at the time. Payano lost the fight via unanimous decision.
- September 26 – Mairis Briedis defeats Yuniel Dorticos to win the IBF and The Ring cruiserweight titles as well as the WBSS cruiserweight division. To date this is the last World Boxing Super Series bout to take place.
- September 26 – Jermall Charlo defeats Sergiy Derevyanchenko by unanimous decision
- September 26 – Jermell Charlo defeats Jeison Rosario by 8th-round KO

==== October ====
- October 3 – Jose Zepeda defeats Ivan Baranchyk by 5th-round KO. This bout was The Ring magazine Fight of the Year for 2020.
- October 4 – Chantelle Cameron beats Adriana Araujo by unanimous decision to win the vacant WBC super-lightweight title
- October 17 – Teófimo López defeats Vasiliy Lomachenko to unify the WBA, IBF, WBO and The Ring lightweight titles
- October 31 – Oleksandr Usyk defeats Derek Chisora by unanimous decision in a WBO world title eliminator
- October 31 – Savannah Marshall defeats Hannah Rankin by 7th-round TKO to win the vacant WBO middleweight title
- October 31 – George Kambosos Jr. defeats Lee Selby by split decision in a final eliminator for the IBF lightweight title
- October 31 – Gervonta Davis knocked out Léo Santa Cruz in the sixth round to win the WBA super featherweight title.
- October 31 – Mario Barrios remained unbeaten and retained his WBA super lightweight title knocking out Ryan Karl in the sixth round.

==== November ====
- November 7 – Devin Haney defeats Yuriorkis Gamboa by unanimous decision to retain the WBC lightweight title
- November 14 – Terence Crawford defeats Kell Brook by 4th-round TKO to retain the WBO welterweight title
- November 28 – Joe Joyce defeats Daniel Dubois by 10th-round KO to win the British, Commonwealth and vacant European heavyweight titles. Following the fight it was revealed that Dubois had suffered a broken left orbital bone and nerve damage around the eye.
- November 28 - Mike Tyson and Roy Jones Jr. fought a 8 Round exhibition ending in a draw.

==== December ====
- December 5 – Lyndon Arthur defeats Anthony Yarde by split decision to retain the Commonwealth light-heavyweight title
- December 5 – Errol Spence Jr. defeats Danny Garcia by unanimous decision, in his first bout since his car crash in October 2019
- December 12 – Anthony Joshua defeats Kubrat Pulev by 9th-round knock out to retain his unified heavyweight championship
- December 19 – Canelo Álvarez defeats Callum Smith by unanimous decision to win the WBA and The Ring super middleweight titles and become a 4 division world champion.

=== 2021 ===
==== January ====
- January 2 - Ryan Garcia defeats Luke Campbell by 7th-round TKO in a WBC lightweight title eliminator
- January 30 - Caleb Plant defeats Caleb Truax by unanimous decision to retain the IBF super middleweight title

==== February ====
- February 13 - Mauricio Lara upset former featherweight champion Josh Warrington by 9th-round TKO
- February 20 - At Las Vegas, Nevada. In a major upset, Oscar Valdez knocks out Miguel Berchelt in the 10th round to win the WBC Junior Lightweight title.
- February 27 - Canelo Álvarez defeats Avni Yıldırım by 4th round corner retirement

==== March ====
- March 13 - Jessica McCaskill defeats Cecilia Braekhus by unanimous decision in their rematch
- March 20 - Lawrence Okolie defeats Krzysztof Głowacki by 6th-round TKO to win the vacant WBO cruiserweight title
- March 27 - Dillian Whyte defeats Alexander Povetkin by 4th-round knock out in their rematch to reclaim the WBC interim heavyweight championship

==== April ====
- April 3 - Jamel Herring defeats Carl Frampton by 6th-round TKO to retain the WBO super-featherweight title. Frampton retired immediately after the bout.
- April 10 - Conor Benn defeats Samuel Vargas by 1st-round KO
- April 10 - Savannah Marshall defeats Maria Lindberg by 3rd-round KO to retain WBO middleweight title
- April 10 - Shannon Courtenay defeats Ebanie Bridges by unanimous decision to win the vacant WBA bantamweight title
- April 17 - Demetrius Andrade defeats Liam Williams by unanimous decision to retain the WBO middleweight title

==== May ====
- May 1 - Joseph Parker defeats Derek Chisora by split decision
- May 1 - Dmitry Bivol defeats Craig Richards by unanimous decision to retain the WBA light-heavyweight title
- May 1 - Katie Taylor defeats Natasha Jonas by unanimous decision
- May 1 - Andy Ruiz Jr. defeats Chris Arreola by unanimous decision
- May 8 - Canelo Álvarez defeats Billy Joe Saunders by 8th round corner retirement to unify WBA, WBC, WBO, and The Ring super middleweight titles
- May 22 - Josh Taylor defeats José Ramírez by unanimous decision to become the undisputed light welterweight champion

==== June ====
- June 19 - Naoya Inoue beat Michael Dasmariñas by 3rd-round KO to retain the WBA & IBF bantamweight titles

==== July ====
- July 17 - Jermell Charlo and Brian Castaño drew in their bout for the undisputed light middleweight championship
- July 24 - Joe Joyce beat Carlos Takam by 6th-round TKO

==== August ====
- August 7 - Kid Galahad defeats Jazza Dickens by 11th-round TKO to win the vacant IBF featherweight title
- August 14 - John Riel Casimero defeats Guillermo Rigondeaux by split decision to retain the WBO bantamweight title. Both fighters set a CompuBox record by landing only a combined 91 punches, the lowest ever recorded for a 12-round fight.
- August 21 - Yordenis Ugás defeats Manny Pacquiao by unanimous decision to retain the WBA welterweight title

==== September ====
- September 4 - The rematch between Mauricio Lara and former featherweight champion Josh Warrington ends in a technical draw after Lara suffered a cut above his left eye following a clash of heads in the 2nd round.
- September 4 - Katie Taylor defeats Jennifer Han by unanimous decision
- September 25 - Oleksandr Usyk defeats Anthony Joshua by unanimous decision to win the WBA, IBF & WBO heavyweight titles, becoming only the third man to win world titles at both cruiserweight and heavyweight, after Evander Holyfield and David Haye.
- September 25 - Lawrence Okolie defeats Dilan Prašović by 3rd-round KO to retain WBO cruiserweight title
- September 29 - Manny Pacquiao officially announced his retirement from boxing in a post on social media.

==== October ====
- October 9 - Jamie Mitchell defeats Shannon Courtenay by majority decision to win WBA bantamweight title
- October 9 - In the final part of their trilogy, Tyson Fury knocks out Deontay Wilder in the 11th round to retain his WBC, Lineal and Ring magazine Heavyweight titles. This bout was The Ring magazine Fight of the Year for 2021.
- October 16 - Savannah Marshall defeats Lolita Muzeya by 2nd-round TKO
- October 23 - Shakur Stevenson defeats Jamel Herring by 10th-round TKO to win the WBO junior lightweight title, becoming a 2 division champion.
- October 30 - Chantelle Cameron defeats Mary McGee by unanimous decision to unify the WBC & IBF super-lightweight championship

==== November ====
- November 5 - Hannah Rankin defeats Maria Lindberg by unanimous decision to win the vacant WBA light middleweight title
- November 6 - Canelo Álvarez defeats Caleb Plant by 11th-round TKO to become the first ever undisputed super middleweight championship
- November 13 - Kiko Martínez defeats Kid Galahad by 6th-round KO to the win IBF featherweight title
- November 13 - Alycia Baumgardner defeats Terri Harper by 4th-round TKO victory to win the WBC super-featherweight title
- November 20 - Terence Crawford defeats Shawn Porter by 10th-round stoppage to defend his WBO welterweight title. Porter retired immediately after the bout.
- November 27 - George Kambosos Jr. defeats Teófimo López by split decision to win the WBA, IBF and WBO lightweight titles

==== December ====
- December 4 - Anthony Yarde defeats Lyndon Arthur by 4th-round KO to regain the Commonwealth light-heavyweight title in their rematch
- December 4 - Devin Haney defeats Joseph Diaz by unanimous decision to retain the WBC lightweight title
- December 4 - Jessica McCaskill defeats Kandi Wyatt by 7th-round TKO
- December 11 - At New York's Madison Square Garden, Vasiliy Lomachenko beat Richard Commey by unanimous decision.
- December 17 - Artur Beterbiev beats Marcus Browne by 9th-round KO

=== 2022 ===
==== January ====
- January 15 – Joe Smith Jr. retained his WBO light heavyweight title with a 9th-round TKO over Steve Geffrard.
- January 22 – Mark Magsayo defeats Gary Russell Jr by split decision to win the WBC featherweight title
- January 30 – Ilunga Makabu defeats Thabiso Mchunu by split decision to retain the WBC cruiserweight title

==== February ====
- February 5 - Chris Eubank Jr. defeats Liam Williams by unanimous decision.
- February 5 - Claressa Shields defeats Ema Kozin by unanimous decision.
- February 12 – John Ryder defeats Daniel Jacobs by split decision
- February 19 – In their long-awaited bout, Kell Brook stopped Amir Khan by 6th-round TKO, both men would end up retiring after the fight.
- February 19 – Natasha Jonas defeats Chris Namús by 2nd-round TKO to win the vacant WBO light-middleweight title
- February 26 – Josh Taylor defeats Jack Catterall by controversial split decision to retain the undisputed light-welterweight titles
- February 27 – Lawrence Okolie defeats Michal Cieslak by unanimous decision to retain WBO cruiserweight title

==== March ====
- March 5 - Román González defeated late replacement Julio Cesar Martínez by unanimous decision
- March 12 - Leigh Wood came from behind to knock out Michael Conlin in the 12th round to retain his WBA Regular featherweight title. This bout was The Ring magazine Fight of the Year for 2022.
- March 26 - Josh Warrington defeats Kiko Martínez in seventh round to reclaim IBF featherweight title in their rematch
- March 26 - Gustavo Daniel Lemos defeats Lee Selby by 5th-round TKO. Just over a week later, Selby retired from boxing.

==== April ====
- April 2 - Savannah Marshall defeats Femke Hermans by third-round KO
- April 9 - Gennady Golovkin defeats Ryōta Murata by ninth-round TKO to unify WBA and IBF middleweight titles
- April 9 - Mikaela Mayer defeats Jennifer Han by unanimous decision to retain the WBO, IBF and The Ring super featherweight titles
- April 16 - Errol Spence Jr. defeats Yordenis Ugás by 10th-round TKO to unify the WBC, WBA and IBF welterweight titles
- April 22 - Paul Butler defeats Jonas Sultan by unanimous decision to win vacant WBO interim bantamweight title
- April 23 - Tyson Fury defeats Dillian Whyte by 6th-round TKO to retain the WBC, Ring magazine and lineal heavyweight titles
- April 30 - Katie Taylor defeats Amanda Serrano by split decision to retain the undisputed lightweight title
- April 30 - Liam Smith defeats Jessie Vargas by 10th-round TKO to win vacant WBO Inter-Continental light middleweight title

==== May ====
- May 7 - Dmitry Bivol defeats Canelo Álvarez by unanimous decision to retain the WBA light heavyweight title
- May 21 - Joshua Buatsi defeats Craig Richards by unanimous decision
- May 28 - Gervonta Davis defeats Rolando Romero by 6th-round TKO

==== June ====
- June 4 - Devin Haney becomes the first undisputed lightweight champion in 32 years by defeating George Kambosos Jr. by unanimous decision
- June 4 - Joe Cordina defeats Kenichi Ogawa by second-round KO to win the IBF super featherweight title
- June 7 - Naoya Inoue defeats Nonito Donaire by second-round knockout in their rematch to unify the WBA (Super), WBC, IBF and The Ring bantamweight titles
- June 11 - Richard Riakporhe defeats Fabio Turchi by second-round TKO in an IBF cruiserweight eliminator
- June 11 - Daniel Dubois defeats Trevor Bryan by fourth-round KO
- June 18 - Artur Beterbiev defeats Joe Smith Jr. by second-round TKO to unify the WBC, IBF, WBO heavyweight titles

==== July ====
- July 2 - Joe Joyce defeats Christian Hammer by 4th-round TKO
- July 2 - Zolani Tete defeats Jason Cunningham by 4th-round knockout to retain the Commonwealth super bantamweight title. The result was later changed to a no contest due to a failed drug test.
- July 9 - Derek Chisora defeats Kubrat Pulev by split decision in their rematch to win the vacant WBA International heavyweight title
- July 16 - Hamzah Sheeraz defeats Francisco Torres by 5th-round TKO to win the vacant WBC Silver middleweight title
- July 30 - Chris Billam-Smith defeats Isaac Chamberlain by unanimous decision to retain the European and Commonwealth cruiserweight titles
- July 30 - Benjamin Whittaker beats Greg O'Neill by 2nd-round KO

==== August ====
- August 20 - Oleksandr Usyk defeats Anthony Joshua by split decision to retain the WBA, IBF, WBO and The Ring heavyweight titles.
- August 27 - Influencer KSI fought 2 "crossover" bouts, against rapper Swarmz and replacement opponent Luis Alcaraz Pineda at a sold out O2 Arena.

==== September ====
- September 3 - Liam Smith defeats Hassan Mwakinyo by 4th-round TKO
- September 3 - Natasha Jonas defeats Patricia Berghult by unanimous decision to unify the WBC and WBO light-middleweight titles
- September 3 - In Mexico, Sivenathi Nontshinga earned a unanimous decision over Hector Flores to take the vacant IBF flyweight championship
- September 17 - Canelo Álvarez defeats Gennady Golovkin by unanimous decision in their third bout, to retain the undisputed super middleweight title
- September 24 - Joe Joyce defeats Joseph Parker by 11th-round TKO
- September 24 - Amanda Serrano defeats Sarah Mahfoud to unify the WBC, IBF, WBO and The Ring featherweight titles
- September 24 - Terri Harper defeats Hannah Rankin to win the WBA light middleweight title

==== October ====
- October 15 - Devin Haney defeats George Kambosos Jr. by unanimous decision in their rematch to retain the undisputed lightweight title
- October 15 - Claressa Shields defeats Savannah Marshall by unanimous decision to become the undisputed middleweight champion
- October 15 - Alycia Baumgardner defeats Mikaela Mayer by split decision to unify the WBC, IBF and WBO super-featherweight titles
- October 15 - Deontay Wilder defeats Robert Helenius by first-round KO
- October 22 - Conor Benn tests positive for the banned substance clomifene in two separate Voluntary Anti-Doping Association tests and his 8 October bout against Chris Eubank Jr was postponed indefinitely the next day.
- October 29 - Katie Taylor defeats Karen Carabajal by unanimous decision

==== November ====
- November 5 - Dmitry Bivol defeats Gilberto Ramírez to retain the WBA light heavyweight title
- November 5 - Chantelle Cameron defeats Jessica McCaskill to become the undisputed light-welterweight champion
- November 5 - Shavkat Rakhimov defeats Zelfa Barrett in round nine by TKO to win the vacant IBF super-featherweight title
- November 12 - Natasha Jonas defeats Marie-Eve Dicaire by unanimous decision to unify WBC, WBO, IBF and The Ring light-middleweight titles
- November 12 - Janibek Alimkhanuly defeats Denzel Bentley by unanimous decision to retain WBO middleweight title
- November 19 - Anthony Yarde defeats Stefani Koykov by 3rd third-round KO
- November 26 - Nina Hughes upsets Jamie Mitchell to win the WBA bantamweight title
- November 26 - Dillian Whyte defeats Jermaine Franklin by a somewhat controversial majority decision
- November 26 - John Ryder defeats Zach Parker by 5th round retirement.

==== December ====
- December 3 - Tyson Fury stops Derek Chisora in the 10th round to retain the WBC and lineal heavyweight titles in their third bout
- December 3 - Daniel Dubois defeats Kevin Lerena by 3rd-round TKO
- December 10 - Luis Alberto Lopez defeats Josh Warrington to win the IBF featherweight title
- December 10 - Ebanie Bridges retained her IBF bantamweight title with an eighth-round stoppage of Shannon O'Connell
- December 13 - Naoya Inoue defeats Paul Butler by 11th-round KO to become first undisputed bantamweight champion in 50 years.
- December 17 - Chris Billam-Smith defeats Armend Xhoxhaj by 5th-round KO
- December 17 - Dan Azeez defeats Rocky Fielding by 8th-round TKO to retain the British and win the vacant Commonwealth light-heavyweight titles

=== 2023 ===
==== January ====
- January 7 - Gervonta Davis stops Héctor García in 8 rounds to retain his WBA (Regular) Lightweight title.
- January 21 - Liam Smith upsets Chris Eubank Jr by 4th-round TKO at the Manchester Arena.
- January 28 - Artur Beterbiev stops Anthony Yarde to retain the WBC, WBO and IBF light-heavyweight titles

==== February ====
- February 4 - Amanda Serrano beats Erika Cruz by decision to become the Undisputed Featherweight Champion at The Theater at Madison Square Garden.
- February 4 - Alycia Baumgardner defeats Elhem Mekhaled to win undisputed super-featherweight championship
- February 18 - Luis Nery knocks out Azat Hovhannisyan in the 11th round. This bout was The Ring magazine Fight of the Year for 2023.
- February 18 - Mauricio Lara stops Leigh Wood in 7 rounds to win the WBA Featherweight title.
- February 26 - Badou Jack defeats Ilunga Makabu by 12th-round TKO to win the WBC cruiserweight title
- February 26 - Tommy Fury beats Jake Paul by split decision

==== March ====
- March 11 - Carlos Takam defeats Tony Yoka by split decision
- March 11 - Dan Azeez defeats Thomas Faure by 12th-round TKO to win the vacant EBU European light-heavyweight title
- March 11 - Lauren Price beats Naomi Mannes by unanimous decision
- March 25 - Lawrence Okolie defeats David Light by unanimous decision to retain the WBO cruiserweight title
- March 25 - David Benavidez defeats Caleb Plant in unanimous decision
- March 25 - José Ramírez defeats Richard Commey by 11th-round knockout

==== April ====
- April 1 - Anthony Joshua defeats Jermaine Franklin by unanimous decision
- April 8 - Jesse Rodriguez overcomes a broken jaw to defeat Cristian Gonzalez by unanimous decision and win the vacant WBO flyweight title
- April 15 - Zhilei Zhang beats Joy Joyce in The Copper Box Arena to win the WBO Interim heavyweight title.
- April 22 - Joe Cordina reclaims his IBF super-featherweight title against Shavkatdzhon Rakhimov by split decision
- April 22 - Gervonta Davis stops Ryan Garcia in 7 Rounds

==== May ====
- May 6 - Undisputed super-middleweight champion Canelo Álvarez returned to his hometown to fight in front of a 93,000 capacity crowd against John Ryder, defeating him by unanimous decision.
- May 13 - KSI knocks out businessman and boxer Joe Fournier. The result was later overturned to a No Contest due to an accidental elbow strike.
- May 13 - Janibek Alimkhanuly retains the WBO middleweight title by knocking out Steven Butler in two rounds
- May 13 - Rolando Romero defeats Ismael Barroso by 9th-round TKO to win the vacant WBA Super Lightweight title
- May 20 - Chantelle Cameron causes an upset by defeating Katie Taylor in her hometown by to win the undisputed light-welterweight championship
- May 20 - Devin Haney defeats Vasiliy Lomachenko by unanimous decision to retain the undisputed lightweight championship
- May 27 - Leigh Wood gets his revenge at the Manchester Arena by beating Mauricio Lara by unanimous decision to win the vacant WBA Featherweight title.
- May 27 - Chris Billam-Smith defeats Lawrence Okolie by majority decision to win the WBO cruiserweight title
- May 27 - Luis Alberto Lopez retains his IBF featherweight title by stopping Michael Conlan in five rounds.

==== June ====
- June 3 - Claressa Shields defeats Maricela Cornejo by unanimous decision to retain the undisputedmiddleweight championship.
- June 10 - Sunny Edwards defeats Andrés Campos by unanimous decision to retain the IBF Flyweight title.
- June 10 - Nina Hughes retains her WBA bantamweight title with a unanimous decision win over Katie Healy
- June 10 - Ellie Scotney beats Cherneka Johnson by unanimous decision to win the IBF super-bantamweight title
- June 10 - Teofimo Lopez defeats Josh Taylor by unanimous decision to win the WBO and The Ring light-welterweight titles
- June 16 - Frazer Clarke defeats Mariusz Wach by decision

==== July ====
- July 1 - Savannah Marshall defeats Franchón Crews-Dezurn by a majority decision to retain the undisputed super-middleweight championship
- July 1 - Natasha Jonas becomes a two-weight world champion with eighth-round stoppage win over Kandi Wyatt for the vacant IBF welterweight title
- July 15 - Alycia Baumgardner beats Christina Linardatou by unanimous decision to retain the undisputed super-featherweight championship
- July 22 - George Kambosos Jr. gets a controversial majority decision win over Maxi Hughes to win the IBO lightweight title
- July 25 - Naoya Inoue defeats Stephen Fulton at the Ariake Arena Tokyo to win the WBC and WBO Super Bantamweight titles and become a 4 division champion
- July 29 - Terence Crawford puts on a Masterclass against Errol Spence Jr. stopping him in the 9th round to become the Undisputed Welterweight champion at the T-Mobile Arena.

==== August ====
- August 5 - Jake Paul defeats mixed martial artist and boxing debutant Nate Diaz by unanimous decision
- August 12 - Anthony Joshua knocks out Robert Helenius in the 7th round.
- August 26 - Oleksandr Usyk knocks out Daniel Dubois in 9 rounds to retain the WBA (Super), IBF, WBO, IBO and the Ring Heavyweight championship.

==== September ====
- September 2 - Chris Eubank Jr defeats Liam Smith in their rematch by 10th-round TKO.
- September 23 - Zhilei Zhang and Joy Joyce have their rematch with Zhang knocking Joyce out in the 3rd round.
- September 23 - Jessica McCaskill and Sandy Ryan draw in their WBA, WBC & WBO welterweight unification bout
- September 23 - After 525 days out of the ring following his testing positive for clomifene, Conor Benn returns to defeat Rodolfo Orozco by unanimous decision.
- September 30 - Jai Opetaia stops Jordan Thompson by 4th-round TKO to retain IBF and The Ring cruiserweight title
- September 30 - Ellie Scotney retains her IBF super-bantamweight title with hard-fought win over Laura Soledad Griffa
- September 30 - Canelo Alvarez defeats Jermell Charlo by unanimous decision to retain the WBA (Super), IBF, WBO, IBO and the Ring Super Middleweight title.

==== October ====
- October 7 - Leigh Wood makes an incredible comeback to knock out Josh Warrington in the 7th Round at the Sheffield Arena to retaining the WBA Featherweight title.
- October 7 - Terri Harper and Cecilia Braekhus fight to majority draw in a WBA & WBO light middleweight title bout.
- October 14 - Tommy Fury battles KSI in a 6th round bout at the Manchester Arena with Fury winning by UD.
- October 21 - Jack Catterall defeats Jorge Linares by unanimous decision
- October 21 - Isaac Chamberlain defeats Mikael Lawal to win the British cruiserweight title
- October 27 - Amanda Serrano retains her WBA, WBO and IBF featherweight titles against Danila Ramos. It was the first women's bout since 2007 to feature 3 minute rounds.
- October 28 - Tyson Fury survives a third round knockdown to beat former mixed martial arts champion (and boxing debutant) Francis Ngannou by a controversial split decision win in a 10-round non-title bout.

==== November ====
- November 4 - Joe Cordina defeats Edward Vazquez by majority decision to retain his IBF Super-Featherweight title.
- November 16 - Shakur Stevenson defeats Edwin De Los Santos to win the vacant WBC Lightweight title and become a three weight champion.
- November 18 - Ema Kozin defeats Hannah Rankin by split decision to win vacant WBC light-middleweight title
- November 18 - Nathan Heaney upsets Denzel Bentley on points to win the British and WBA Continental middleweight titles
- November 18 - Nick Ball defeats Isaac Dogboe in a WBC featherweight final eliminator
- November 25 - Katie Taylor gets revenge by defeating Chantelle Cameron by majority decision to regain the Undisputed Light-Welterweight championship.
- November 25 - David Benavidez defeats Demetrius Andrade via 6th round retirement

==== December ====
- December 2 - Jordan Gill defeats Michael Conlan by TKO in the 7th round
- December 10 - Chris Billam-Smith defeats Mateusz Masternak to defend the WBO cruiserweight title
- December 16 - Jesse Rodriguez becomes the unified IBF and WBO flyweight champion by defeating Sunny Edwards by 9th round retirement
- December 23 - The Day of Reckoning card as part of Riyadh Season is held:
  - Jai Opetaia defeats Ellis Zorro by 1st-round KO to retain The Ring cruiserweight title
  - Agit Kabayel defeats Arslanbek Makhmudov by 4th-round TKO
  - Daniel Dubois defeats Jarrell Miller by TKO with only 10 seconds left in the 10th and final round.
  - Dmitry Bivol defeats Lyndon Arthur to retain the WBA Light Heavyweight title
  - Joseph Parker upsets Deontay Wilder by wide unanimous decision
  - Anthony Joshua dominated Otto Wallin defeating him by 5th round retirement
- December 26 - Naoya Inoue defeats Marlon Tapales by 10th-round KO to become the first ever Undisputed super bantamweight champion

=== 2024 ===
==== January ====
- January 13 - Artur Beterbiev beat Callum Smith with a 7th-round TKO to retain the WBC, IBF and WBO Light Heavyweight Championship.
- January 20 – Natasha Jonas beats Mikaela Mayer via split decision to retain the IBF welterweight title.
- January 27 – Jaime Munguia stopped John Ryder by ninth-round TKO.

==== February ====
- February 3 - Joshua Buatsi defeats Dan Azeez by unanimous decision to win the British and Commonwealth light-heavyweight titles
- February 8 - Teofimo Lopez defends his WBO light-welterweight title with a controversial unanimous decision win over Jamaine Ortiz
- February 10 - Hamzah Sheeraz defeats Liam Williams by 1st-round TKO to retain the Commonwealth middleweight titles
- February 10 - Anthony Yarde defeats Marko Nikolic by 3rd-round KO
- February 16:
  - In Mexico, Sivenathi Nontshinga knocks out Adrian Curiel in the 10th round to regain the IBF Light Flyweight Championship.
  - In Madison Square Garden in New York City, O'Shaquie Foster beat Abraham Nova via split decision to retain the WBC Super Featherweight Championship.

==== March ====
- March 3 - Raymond Ford defeats Otabek Kholmatov by 12th-round TKO to win the vacant WBA featherweight title
- March 8 - Rey Vargas and Nick Ball fight to a controversial split draw decision, which meant Vargas retained the WBC featherweight title
  - Despite Suffering Two Knockdown Joseph Parker defeats Zhilei Zhang by majority decision to win the WBO Interim Heavyweight title
  - In Saudi Arabia, Anthony Joshua KOs Francis Ngannou in the 2nd Round in dominating fashion.
- March 17 - Dillian Whyte defeats Christian Hammer in three rounds on his comeback from his positive drug test from a contaminated supplement
- March 23 - Sandy Ryan defeats Terri Harper by fourth round retirement to retain the WBO welterweight title
- March 29 - Seniesa Estrada outpoints Yokasta Valle to become the undisputed minimumweight championship
- March 30 - At the T-Mobile Arena, Sebastian Fundora beats Tim Tszyu via split decision to be the new WBC and WBA Welterweight Champion.
- March 30 - Gilberto Ramírez outpoints Arsen Goulamirian to win the WBA cruiserweight title
- March 31 - At the O2, British and Commonwealth heavyweight champion Fabio Wardley and Frazer Clarke fight to a split decision draw.

==== April ====
- April 13 - Ellie Scotney defeats Ségolène Lefebvre to unify the IBF & WBO and win the vacant The Ring super-bantamweight titles
- April 13 - Rhiannon Dixon drops Karen Elizabeth Carabajal on way to a unanimous decision win to retain WBO lightweight title
- April 13 - Zelfa Barrett stops Jordan Gill by tenth-round TKO
- April 20 - Ryan Garcia defeated Devin Haney by majority decision at the Barclays Center in Brooklyn, New York. However, the result was later ruled a no contest after Garcia tested positive for Ostarine.

==== May ====
- May 4 - Canelo Álvarez And Jaime Munguía battle it out in a 12 round war, with Munguía suffering a knockdown in the 4th round. Canelo won by unanimous decision to retain the Undisputed Super Middleweight championship
- May 4 - Ryosuke Nishida beats Emmanuel Rodríguez by unanimous decision to win the IBF bantamweight title
- May 11 - At the RAC Arena in Perth, Australia Vasiliy Lomachenko defeated George Kambosos Jr. via 11th-round TKO to win the vacant IBF lightweight world title.
- May 11 - Cherneka Johnson defeats Nina Hughes by majority decision to win the WBA bantamweight title
- May 11 - Lauren Price defeats Jessica McCaskill by 9th round technical decision to win the WBA & Ring magazine welterweight titles
- May 11 - Erika Cruz and Nazarena Romero fight to a split draw, with Cruz retaining the WBA super-bantamweight title
- May 18 - In Riyadh, Saudi Arabia, Oleksandr Usyk defeated Tyson Fury by split decision to become the first undisputed heavyweight champion since Lennox Lewis in 1999, and the first of the four-belt era.
  - Jai Opetaia defeats Mairis Briedis by unanimous decision to retain the IBF and The Ring cruiserweight titles
  - Anthony Cacace defeats Joe Cordina by 8th-round TKO to win the IBF super-featherweight title
- May 25 - Jack Catterall defeats Josh Taylor by unanimous decision in their rematch

==== June ====
- June 1 - Boxers from Queensberry Promotions and Matchroom went head-to-head in a 5v5 card. Queensberry completed a clean sweep, with all five of their fighters winning every bout.
  - Willy Hutchinson defeats Craig Richards by unanimous decision
  - Nick Ball defeats Raymond Ford by split decision to win the WBA featherweight title
  - Hamzah Sheeraz defeats Austin Williams by 11th-round TKO
  - Daniel Dubois secures upset 8th-round TKO against Filip Hrgović to win the IBF 'interim' heavyweight title
  - Zhilei Zhang stops Deontay Wilder by fifth-round KO
- June 7 - Adrien Broner suffer defeat to Blair Cobbs by unanimous decision
- June 15 - Chris Billam-Smith avenges his only defeats by earning a unanimous decision victory over Richard Riakporhe to retain the WBO cruiserweight title in their rematch
- June 15 - In his first bout as WBA Lightweight champion (and his first major world title bout in nearly four years), Gervonta Davis knocks out Frank Martin in round 8
- June 15 - Liam Paro causes a massive upset beating Subriel Matías by unanimous decision in his hometown to win the IBF Light-Welterweight belt.
- June 21 - Lyndon Arthur defeats Liam Cameron via split decision for the vacant WBA inter-continental light-heavyweight title
- June 26 - Interim IBF champion Daniel Dubois is elevated to full heavyweight champion after Oleksandr Usyk vacates the belt to have a rematch with Tyson Fury rather than face his mandatory Dubois.
- June 28 - Lamont Roach Jr. stops Feargal McCrory in the eighth round to retain the WBA super-featherweight title
- June 29 - Teofimo Lopez defeats Steve Claggett via unanimous decision to retain the WBO light-welterweight title
- June 29 - Jesse Rodriguez defeats Juan Francisco Estrada by 7th-round TKO to win the WBC and Ring Super-Flyweight titles.

==== July ====
- July 6 - Johnny Fisher stops Alen Babić in 36 seconds
- July 6 - Shakur Stevenson retains his WBC lightweight title with a unanimous decision victory over Artem Harutyunyan
- July 6 - Former mixed martial artists Nate Diaz and Jorge Masvidal have a rematch of their UFC bout in the boxing ring with Diaz winning by 10th round majority decision
- July 13 - Jaron Ennis defends his IBF welterweight title with a fifth-round stoppage win over David Avanesyan
- July 13 - Skye Nicolson defeats Dyana Vargas to retain the WBC featherweight title
- July 20 - Chantelle Cameron defeats Elhem Mekhaled by majority decision
- July 20 - Amanda Serrano defeats Stevie Morgan by 2nd-round TKO
- July 27 - Derek Chisora defeats Joy Joyce in a competitive slugfest by unanimous decision
- July 27 - Claressa Shields defeats Vanessa Lepage-Joanisse to win the WBC heavyweight & WBO light-heavyweight titles to become four-weight world champion

==== August ====
- August 3 - In Las Vegas Terence Crawford moves up to 154 lbs defeat Israil Madrimov by unanimous decision, at the BMO Stadium in front of 17,179 people to win the WBA Super-Welterweight title and become a four-weight world champion
- August 10 - Angelo Leo defeats Luis Alberto Lopez by tenth-round knockout to win the IBF featherweight title

==== September ====
- September 3 - Naoya Inoue defeats TJ Doheny by 7th-round TKO to retain the undisputed super-bantamweight title
- September 3 - Yoshiki Takei survives a knockdown to defeat Daigo Higa on points and retain the WBO bantamweight title
- September 14 - Mexican Superstar Canelo Álvarez beats Edgar Berlanga in the T-Mobile Arena to retain the WBA, WBC, WBO and The Ring Super Middleweight titles.
- September 14 - Erislandy Lara defeats Danny Garcia by ninth round retirement to retain the WBA middleweight title
- September 21 - In British boxing attendance record in front of 98,198 people at Wembley Stadium Daniel Dubois and Anthony Joshua face each other, with Dubois shocking the world by KOing Joshua in the fifth round to retain the IBF Heavyweight Championship.
  - Anthony Cacace defeats Josh Warrington on points to retain IBF super-featherweight title
  - Joshua Buatsi defeats Willy Hutchinson to win the WBO interim light-heavyweight title
  - Hamzah Sheeraz defeats Tyler Denny to win the European and retain the Commonwealth middleweight title
- September 27 - Charlie Edwards outpoints Thomas Essomba to win the European bantamweight title
- September 27 - Mikaela Mayer defeats Sandy Ryan by majority decision to win the WBO welterweight title. This coming after the champion is assaulted by paint on the morning of the bout.
- September 27 - Alycia Baumgardner vs. Delfine Persoon ends in a no-contest after an accidental head clash caused a cut. Baumgardner remains the Undisputed super featherweight champion.
- September 27 - Terri Harper defeats Rhiannon Dixon by unanimous decision to win the WBO lightweight title

==== October ====
- October 4 - Janibek Alimkhanuly knocks out Andrei Mikhailovich in nine rounds to retain the IBF middleweight title
- October 5 - Nick Ball stops Ronny Rios by 10th-round TKO to retain the WBA featherweight title
- October 12 - Masamichi Yabuki defeats Sivenathi Nontshinga in nine rounds to win the IBF light-flyweight title
- October 12 - Artur Beterbiev defeats Dmitry Bivol to become the Undisputed Light heavyweight champion
  - Fabio Wardley knocks out Frazer Clarke in the first round to retain his British heavyweight title in their rematch
  - Jai Opetaia defeats Jack Massey by 6th-round TKO to retain the IBF and The Ring cruiserweight titles
  - Skye Nicolson retains her WBC featherweight title by unanimous decision against Raven Chapman
- October 13 - Seiya Tsutsumi defeats Takuma Inoue to win the WBA bantamweight title
- October 14 - Junto Nakatani defeats Petch Sor Chitpattana in six rounds to retain the WBC bantamweight title
- October 18 - Bakhram Murtazaliev defeats Tim Tszyu inside 3 Rounds to defend his IBF Super-Welterweight Belt.
- October 26 - In Manchester Jack Catterall and Regis Prograis battle it out for 12 Rounds at the Co-op Live, with Catterall winning a unanimous decision.

==== November ====
- November 2 - Shabaz Masoud defeats Liam Davies by split decision to retain the IBO super-bantamweight title
  - Chantelle Cameron defeats Patricia Berghult by unanimous decision
- November 2 - O'Shaquie Foster gets his revenge against Robson Conceição to regain the WBC Featherweight Title.
- November 9 - Jesse Rodriguez KOs Pedro Guevara in the third round to retain the WBC and Ring Super-Flyweight titles.
- November 9 - Jaron Ennis defeats Karen Chukhadzhian by unanimous decision in his hometown of Philadelphia to retain the IBF welterweight title.
- November 15 - Katie Taylor narrowly outpoints Amanda Serrano in their rematch to retain the undisputed light-welterweight title.
  - Jake Paul and hall of fame boxer Mike Tyson had an uneventful 8 round bout with Paul winning by decision.
- November 16 - Gilberto Ramírez defeats Chris Billam-Smith by unanimous decision to unify the WBA and WBO cruiserweight titles

==== December ====
- December 14 - Natasha Jonas defeats Ivana Habazin by unanimous decision to unify the WBC & IBF welterweight titles
  - Lauren Price stops Bexcy Mateus in three rounds to retain the WBA welterweight title
- December 21 - Oleksandr Usyk defeats Tyson Fury by unanimous decision in their rematch to retain WBC, WBA, WBO, Ring & Lineal heavyweight titles
  - Moses Itauma stops Demsey McKean by first-round KO
  - Johnny Fisher defeats Dave Allen by a controversial split decision

=== 2025 ===
==== January ====
- January 8 - IBF and Ring cruiserweight champion Jai Opetaia beats David Nykia by KO in Gold Coast, Australia
- January 11 - WBC lightweight champion Caroline Dubois retains her title with a technical draw with Jessica Camara after a clash of heads.
- January 13 - Former unified heavyweight champion Tyson Fury announces his third retirement from boxing after speculation linked him to a clash with fellow former unified champion Anthony Joshua
- January 24 - Naoya Inoue took on South Korean Ye Joon Kim in Tokyo, Japan with Inoue retaining his undisputed super bantamweight crown by knocking out Kim Ye-joon in round 4.
- January 25 - Ellie Scotney defeats Mea Motu by unanimous decision to retain the IBF & WBO super-bantamweight titles

==== February ====
- February 1 - David Benavidez and David Morrell have a 12-round war with Benavidez coming out as the victor at the T-Mobile Arena in Las Vegas, Nevada
- February 2 - Claressa Shields becomes the first undisputed three weight world champion in the four-belt era by defeating Danielle Perkins by unanimous decision to become the WBA & WBC heavyweight champion.
- February 8 - Derek Chisora has his final fight in the UK at the Co-op Live in Manchester, defeating Otto Wallin by unanimous decision.
- February 14 - Keyshawn Davis defeats Denys Berinchyk by 4th-round KO to win the WBO lightweight title
- February 15 - Arnold Barboza Jr. upsets Jack Catterall by split decision
- February 22 - Dmitry Bivol defeats Artur Beterbiev by majority decision in their rematch to win the undisputed light-heavyweight championship
  - Joseph Parker stops late replacement Martin Bakole in two rounds
  - Carlos Adames defeats Hamzah Sheeraz to retain the WBC middleweight title
  - Shakur Stevenson stops Josh Padley to retain the WBC lightweight title
- February 24 - Junto Nakatani stops David Cuellar Contreras in three rounds to retain the WBC bantamweight title
  - Seiya Tsutsumi retains his WBA bantamweight title after unanimous draw with Daigo Higa

==== March ====
- March 1 - Paddy Donovan and Lewis Crocker fight ends in a DQ after Donovan hits after the bell.
- March 1 - Gervonta Davis retains his WBA lightweight title after a highly controversial majority draw against Lamont Roach Jr.
  - Alberto Puello retains his WBC super-lightweight title with split decision win over Sandor Martin
  - Gary Antuanne Russell defeats José Valenzuela by unanimous decision to win the WBA light-welterweight title
- March 7 - Lauren Price defeats Natasha Jonas by unanimous decision to unify WBC, WBA & IBF welterweight titles
  - Caroline Dubois defeats Bo Mi Re Shin by majority decision to retain WBC lightweight title
  - Karriss Artingstall defeats Raven Chapman by unanimous decision to win the vacant British featherweight title.
- March 15 - Nick Ball defeats TJ Doheny 11th round corner retirement to retain the WBA featherweight title
- March 16 - Callum Walsh KO Dean Sutherland in one round.
- March 22 - Skye Nicolson suffers a shock split decision loss to Tiara Brown and loses her WBC featherweight title
  - Cherneka Johnson stops Nina Hughes in their rematch to retain the WBA bantamweight title
- March 22 - Sebastian Fundora defeats Chordale Booker by 4th-round TKO to retain the WBC and WBO light-middleweight titles
- March 29 - Mikaela Mayer defeats Sandy Ryan by unanimous decision in their rematch to retain the WBO welterweight title
  - Brian Norman Jr. beats Derrieck Cuevas by 3rd-round TKO to retain the WBO welterweight title

==== April ====
- April 5 - Unified IBF & WBO middleweight champion Janibek Alimkhanuly defeats Anauel Ngamissengue by 5th-round TKO in a homecoming bout
- April 5 - Filip Hrgović defeats Joe Joyce by unanimous decision
- April 10 - Mary Spencer defeats Ogleidis Suárez by unanimous decision to retain the WBA light middleweight title
- April 12 - Jaron Ennis defeats Eimantas Stanionis by 6th round retirement to unify the WBA, IBF & The Ring welterweight titles
- April 19 - Gabriela Fundora defeats Marilyn Badillo to retain the undisputed flyweight championship
- April 20 - Ben Whittaker defeats Liam Cameron by 2nd-round TKO
  - Frazer Clarke stops Ebaneezer Tetteh in the 1st round
- April 26 - Chris Eubank Jr defeats Conor Benn by unanimous decision
  - Anthony Yarde beats Lyndon Arthur on points in their trilogy fight

==== May ====
- May 2 - Rolando Romero defeats Ryan Garcia by unanimous decision
  - Devin Haney defeats José Ramírez by unanimous decision
  - Teofimo Lopez defeats Arnold Barboza Jr. by unanimous decision to retain the WBO and The Ring light welterweight titles
- May 3 - Canelo Álvarez defeats William Scull unanimous decision to retain the undisputed super middleweight title
- May 4 - Naoya Inoue stops Ramon Cardenas in the 8th round to retain the undisputed super-bantamweight championship
  - Rafael Espinoza defeats Edward Vazquez by 7th-round TKO to retain the WBO featherweight title
- May 10 - Anthony Cacace stops Leigh Wood in nine rounds
- May 17 - Dave Allen defeats Johnny Fisher by 5th-round TKO in their rematch
- May 23 - Terri Harper defeats Natalie Zimmermann to retain the WBO lightweight title by unanimous decision
- May 24 - Angelo Leo beats Tomoki Kameda by majority decision to retain the IBF featherweight title
- May 24 - Ekow Essuman upsets Josh Taylor by unanimous decision
- May 28 - Yoshiki Takei stops Yuttapong Tongdee in the 1st round to retain WBO bantamweight title
  - Eduardo Núñez outpoints Masanori Rikiishi to claim the vacant IBF super-featherweight title

==== June ====
- June 6 - Franchón Crews-Dezurn defeats Citalli Ortiz by majority decision to retain the WBA & WBC super middleweight titles
- June 7 - Fabio Wardley stops Justis Huni in the 10th round
- June 7 - Beatriz Ferreira defeats Maria Ines Ferreyra by unanimous decision to retain the IBF lightweight title
- June 8 - Jai Opetaia stops Claudio Squeo in the 5th round to retain the IBF and The Ring cruiserweight titles
- June 8 - Junto Nakatani defeats Ryosuke Nishida by 6th round referee stoppage to unify the WBC, IBF & The Ring bantamweight titles
- June 14 - Richardson Hitchins defeats George Kambosos Jr. by 8th-round TKO rounds to retain the IBF light-welterweight title
- June 19 - Brian Norman Jr. defeats Jin Sasaki by 5th-round TKO to retain WBO welterweight title
- June 28 - Gilberto Ramírez defeats Yuniel Dorticos by unanimous decision to retain the WBA and WBO cruiserweight titles

==== July ====
- July 11 - Katie Taylor beats Amanda Serrano in their trilogy fight, winning by unanimous decision.
  - Ellie Scotney defeats Yamileth Mercado by unanimous decision to unify the WBC, IBF, WBO & The Ring super-bantamweight titles
  - Shadasia Green upsets Savannah Marshall by split decision to unify the IBF & WBO super-middleweight titles
  - Alycia Baumgardner defeats Jennifer Miranda by unanimous decision to retain the undisputed super featherweight title
  - Cherneka Johnson stops Shurretta Metcalf by 9th-round TKO to become the undisputed bantamweight champion
- July 12 - Shakur Stevenson defended his WBC Lightweight championship with a unanimous decision over William Zepeda.
  - Hamzah Sheeraz defeats Edgar Berlanga by 5th-round TKO
- July 19 - Oleksandr Usyk and Daniel Dubois have their rematch at Wembley Stadium with Usyk knocking out Dubois in the 5th round to become a 2x undisputed heavyweight champion.
- July 19 - Mario Barrios vs. Manny Pacquiao ends in a majority draw.
- July 26 - Claressa Shields defends her undisputed heavyweight title against Lani Daniels winning by unanimous decision.

==== August ====
- August 16 - Moses Itauma knocks out Dillian Whyte in the 1st round
  - Nick Ball defeats Sam Goodman by unanimous decision to retain the WBA featherweight title
- August 23 - Jack Rafferty fought Mark Chamberlain to a 12-round majority draw. Rafferty retained his Commonwealth Light welterweight belt.

==== September ====
- September 5 - Michael Conlan made his Dublin homecoming and knocked out Jack Bateson in the 4th round.
- September 13 - Lewis Crocker beats Paddy Donovan by split decision in their rematch at Windsor Park to win the IBF welterweight belt.
- September 13 - Terence Crawford defeated Canelo Álvarez by unanimous decision to win the undisputed super middleweight championship.
- September 14 - Naoya Inoue defended his super-bantamweight belts against Murodjon Akhmadaliev and wins by unanimous decision.

==== October ====
- October 4 - Cecilia Braekhus retires after defeating Ema Kozin by unanimous decision to win the WBC & WBO light-middleweight titles
- October 25 - Fabio Wardley defeats Joseph Parker by TKO in round 11 to win the WBO Interim heavyweight title.

==== November ====
- November 1 - Joshua Butasi defeats Zach Parker by majority decision in Manchester.
- November 8 - Virgil Ortiz Jr defeats Erickson Lubin by TKO in round two and defends his WBC interim super-welterweight belt.
- November 15 - Chris Eubank Jr and Conor Benn have their rematch at Tottenham Hotspur Stadium, with Benn picking up a unanimous decision victory
- November 22 - Abdullah Mason makes history by becoming the youngest lightweight champion by beating Sam Noakes by unanimous decision .
- November 22 - Jesse Rodriguez wins the WBA super-flyweight title by KO Fernando Martinez in round 10.
- November 22 - Devin Haney defeats Brian Norman Jr by unanimous decision to win the WBO welterweight title.
- November 22 - David Benavidez TKO Anthony Yarde in Round 7.
- November 29 - Ben Whittaker KO Benjamin Gavazi in one round.

==== December ====
December 6 - Jai Opetaia KO Huysein Cinkara in 8 rounds to defend his IBF and Ring magazine cruiserweight belts.

December 6 - Issac Cruz and Lamont Roach ends in a majority draw.

December 19 - Anthony Joshua KO Jake Paul in round 6 in Miami.

December 27 - Junto Nakatani defeats Sebastian Hernandez by unanimous decision.

December 27 - Naoya Inoue defeats Alan Picasso by unanimous decision in Saudi Arabia to defend his undisputed super-bantamweight belts.
