= Marie-Eve Dicaire =

Canadian boxer (born 1986)

Marie-Ève Dicaire
Personal information
- Born: July 29, 1986 (age 40) Saint-Eustache, Quebec, Canada
- Height: 170 cm (5 ft 7 in)
- Weight: Super-welterweight

Boxing career
- Reach: 180 cm (71 in)
- Stance: Southpaw

Boxing record
- Total fights: 20
- Wins: 18
- Win by KO: 1
- Losses: 2

Marie-Ève Dicaire (born July 29, 1986) is a Canadian former professional boxer who is a two-time IBF female super-welterweight World champion having held the title from December 2018 to March 2021 and from December 2021 to November 2022.

== Biography ==
Dicaire was a standout karate practitioner, winning a Canadian championship at 11 and a world championship at 18, before turning to boxing where she excelled as an amateur claiming Quebec and Canadian championships in 2013 before turning professional in 2015.

She defeated Marisa Gabriela Núñez from Argentina by majority decision to claim the vacant NABF female super-welterweight title at the Montreal Casino in Montreal, Canada on February 15, 2018.

Dicaire beat Uruguayan Chris Namús for the IBF female super-welterweight World title on December 1, 2018, at the Videotron Center in Quebec City, Canada, winning by unanimous decision.

She successfully defended her title three times before facing fellow undefeated boxer and WBC and WBO super-welterweight champion Claressa Shields on March 5, 2021. The vacant WBA belt was also on the line. Shields won the contest in Flint, Michigan, USA, by unanimous decision.

After Shields vacated the IBF title, Dicaire regained it by knocking out the previously unbeaten Cynthia Lozano in the seventh-round at the Bell Centre, Montreal, Canada, on 17 December 2021.

On 12 November 2022, she once again attempted to become a unified World champion by facing WBC and WBO title holder Natasha Jonas in Manchester, England. Jonas won by unanimous decision.

Dicaire announced her retirement from boxing in March 2023.

Dicaire was acclaimed to Terrebonne City Council in the 2025 municipal elections.

== Professional boxing record ==
20 fights	18 wins	2 losses
By knockout	1	0
By decision	17	2

No.	Result	Record	Opponent	Type	Round, time	Date	Location	Notes
20	Loss	18–2	(United Kingdom) Natasha Jonas	UD	10	Nov 12, 2022	(United Kingdom) AO Arena, Manchester, England	Lost IBF female light middleweight title; For WBC, WBO female light middleweight titles
19	Win	18–1	(Mexico) Cynthia Lozano	KO	7 (10), 1:03	Dec 17, 2021	Bell Centre, Montreal, Canada	Won vacant IBF female light middleweight title
18	Loss	17–1	(United States) Claressa Shields	UD	10	Mar 5, 2021	(United States) Dort Financial Center, Flint, Michigan, U.S.	Lost IBF female light middleweight title; For WBC, WBO, vacant WBA (Super), and inaugural The Ring female light middleweight titles
17	Win	17–0	(Venezuela) Ogleidis Suárez	UD	10	Nov 23, 2019	Videotron Centre, Quebec City, Canada	Retained IBF female light middleweight title
16	Win	16–0	(Sweden) Maria Lindberg	UD	10	Jun 28, 2019	Montreal Casino, Montreal, Canada	Retained IBF female light middleweight title
15	Win	15–0	(Sweden) Mikaela Laurén	UD	10	Apr 13, 2019	Montreal Casino, Montreal, Canada	Retained IBF female light middleweight title
14	Win	14–0	(Uruguay) Chris Namús	UD	10	Dec 1, 2018	Videotron Centre, Quebec City, Canada	Won IBF female light middleweight title
13	Win	13–0	(Mexico) Alejandra Ayala	UD	10	July 20, 2018	Place Bell de Laval, Laval, Canada	
12	Win	12–0	(Argentina) Yamila Belen Abellaneda	UD	10	June 9, 2018	Montreal Casino, Montreal, Canada	
11	Win	11–0	(Argentina) Marisa Gabriela Núñez	UD	10	Feb 15, 2018	Montreal Casino, Montreal, Canada	Won vacant WBC-NABF female light middleweight title
10	Win	10–0	(Mexico) Paty Ramirez	UD	8	Dec 7, 2017	Montreal Casino, Montreal, Canada	
9	Win	9–0	(Argentina) Yamila Esther Reynoso	UD	10	Oct 25, 2017	Casino du Lac Leamy, Gatineau, Canada	
8	Win	8–0	(Mexico) Alejandra Ayala	UD	8	Jun 15, 2017	Montreal Casino, Montreal, Canada	
7	Win	7–0	(United States) Lisa Noel Garland	UD	8	Feb 9, 2017	Montreal Casino, Montreal, Canada	
6	Win	6–0	(Mexico) Paty Ramirez	UD	6	Dec 12, 2016	Montreal Casino, Montreal, Canada	
5	Win	5–0	(Mexico) Karla Zamora	UD	6	Nov 20, 2016	Montreal Casino, Montreal, Canada	
4	Win	4–0	(United States) Ashleigh Curry	UD	6	May 24, 2016	Montreal Casino, Montreal, Canada	
3	Win	3–0	(Mexico) Martha Patricia Lara Gaytan	UD	4	Mar 17, 2016	Montreal Casino, Montreal, Canada	
2	Win	2–0	(Canada) Christina Barry	UD	4	Jan 21, 2016	Montreal Casino, Montreal, Canada	
1	Win	1–0	(Canada) Christina Barry	UD	4	Nov 20, 2015	Colisée Cardin, Sorel-Tracy, Canada	
