= Samuel Vargas =

Canadian-Colombian boxer (born 1989)

Personal information
- Nationality: Colombian; Canadian
- Born: Samuel Andres Vargas Ariza; 12 April 1989 (age 37) Bogotá, Colombia
- Height: 5 ft 9 in (175 cm)
- Weight: Welterweight; Light middleweight

Boxing career
- Reach: 72 in (183 cm)

Boxing record
- Total fights: 41
- Wins: 31
- Win by KO: 14
- Losses: 8
- Draws: 2

Samuel Andrés Vargas Ariza (born 12 April 1989) is a Canadian-Colombian professional boxer.

== Professional career ==
Vargas turned professional in 2010 at the age of 20, scoring a technical knockout (TKO) victory against Todd Furler in Montreal, Quebec.

He won the NCC Welterweight championship by defeating Manolis Plaitis in 2012.

In 2013 he received NABA Canada super welterweight title after a TKO victory against Julius Bunda in Toronto, Ontario

On 13 October 2016, it was announced that Vargas would face off against WBC welterweight champion Danny García at the Liacouras Center on 12 November. It was said that the fight would be a non-title ten-round fight. Vargas lost via TKO in the seventh round.

On 25 July 2020, Vargas was the first boxer to go more than six rounds with undefeated prospect Vergil Ortiz Jr, losing by TKO in the seventh round.

Vargas' next fight would be against undefeated Conor Benn in the Copper Box Arena in London on 10 April 2021. The fight lasted just 80 seconds, as Benn landed two right-left combinations which rocked Vargas, followed by a barrage of punches and a hard uppercut on the ropes that saw the bout stopped, resulting in Vargas' seventh professional loss. On March 13, 2022, Vargas announced his retirement from boxing.

== Personal life ==
Vargas currently resides in Toronto, Ontario.

== Championships and accomplishments ==
- National Championship of Canada
  - NCC Welterweight Championship (One time)
- World Boxing Association/North American Boxing Association
  - WBA-NABA Welterweight Championship (One time)
  - Interim WBA-NABA Welterweight Championship (One time)
  - WBA-NABA Canada Super Welterweight Championship (One time)

== Professional boxing record ==
| 41 fights | 31 wins | 8 losses |
|---|---|---|
| By knockout | 14 | 4 |
| By decision | 17 | 4 |
| Draws | 2 | |

| No. | Result | Record | Opponent | Type | Round, time | Date | Location | Notes |
|---|---|---|---|---|---|---|---|---|
| 41 | Loss | 31–8–2 | (Poland) Przemyslaw Runowski | UD | 10 | 13 Mar 2022 | Rebel Entertainment Complex, Toronto, Ontario, Canada | For vacant IBO International welterweight title. |
| 40 | Loss | 31–7–2 | (United Kingdom) Conor Benn | TKO | 1 (12), 1:20 | 10 Apr 2021 | (United Kingdom) Copper Box Arena, London, England | For WBA Continental welterweight title. |
| 39 | Loss | 31–6–2 | (United States) Vergil Ortiz Jr. | TKO | 7 (12), 2:58 | 24 Jul 2020 | (United States) Fantasy Springs Resort Casino, Indio, California, U.S. | For WBA Gold welterweight title |
| 38 | Win | 31–5–2 | (Mexico) Silverio Ortiz | UD | 8 | 29 Jun 2019 | Scotiabank Convention Centre, Niagara Falls, Ontario, Canada | |
| 37 | Loss | 30–5–2 | (United States) Luis Collazo | SD | 10 | 17 Mar 2019 | (United States) Hulu Theater, New York City, New York, U.S. | |
| 36 | Win | 30–4–2 | (Argentina) Gabriel Adrian Pereiro | UD | 10 | 15 Dec 2018 | Coca-Cola Coliseum, Toronto, Ontario, Canada | |
| 35 | Loss | 29–4–2 | (United Kingdom) Amir Khan | UD | 12 | 8 Sep 2018 | (United Kingdom) Arena Birmingham, Birmingham, England | |
| 34 | Draw | 29–3–2 | (Argentina) Mauro Maximiliano Godoy | MD | 10 | 2 Jun 2018 | Scotiabank Convention Centre, Niagara Falls, Ontario, Canada | Retained WBA-NABA welterweight title |
| 33 | Win | 29–3–1 | (Finland) Jussi Koivula | SD | 10 | 11 Nov 2017 | Powerade Centre, Brampton, Ontario, Canada | Retained WBA-NABA welterweight title |
| 32 | Win | 28–3–1 | (South Africa) Ali Funeka | MD | 10 | 19 Aug 2017 | Powerade Centre, Brampton, Ontario, Canada | Retained WBA-NABA welterweight title |
| 31 | Win | 27–3–1 | (Venezuela) Marco Antonio Avendano | KO | 5 (10), 0:10 | 20 May 2017 | Coliseo Carlos Mauro Hoyo, Medellín, Colombia | |
| 30 | Win | 26–3–1 | (Mexico) Armando Robles | UD | 10 | 18 Mar 2017 | Powerade Centre, Brampton, Ontario, Canada | Retained WBA-NABA welterweight title |
| 29 | Loss | 25–3–1 | (United States) Danny García | TKO | 7 (10), 2:27 | 12 Nov 2016 | (United States) Liacouras Center, Philadelphia, Pennsylvania, U.S. | |
| 28 | Win | 25–2–1 | (Mexico) Juan Armando Garcia | UD | 10 | 14 May 2016 | Aitken Centre, Fredericton, New Brunswick, Canada | Won WBA-NABA welterweight title |
| 27 | Win | 24–2–1 | (Mexico) Edgar Ortega | UD | 8 | 27 Feb 2016 | Hershey Centre, Mississauga, Ontario, Canada | |
| 26 | Win | 23–2–1 | (Brazil) Robson Assis | TKO | 6 (10), 1:26 | 11 Dec 2015 | The Mattamy Events Center, Toronto, Ontario, Canada | Won WBA-NABA interim welterweight title |
| 25 | Win | 22–2–1 | (Mexico) Ulises Jimenez | TKO | 2 (8), 2:16 | 11 Aug 2015 | Woodbine Convention Hall, Toronto, Ontario, Canada | |
| 24 | Win | 21–2–1 | (Mexico) Cesar Chavez | TKO | 3 (8), 1:26 | 12 Jun 2015 | Shaw Conference Centre, Edmonton, Alberta, Canada | |
| 23 | Loss | 20–2–1 | (United States) Errol Spence Jr. | TKO | 4 (10), 1:45 | 11 Apr 2015 | (United States) Barclays Center, New York City, New York, U.S. | |
| 22 | Win | 20–1–1 | (Switzerland) Flavio Turelli | TKO | 5 (10), 1:48 | 13 Dec 2014 | Club de boxe de l'est, Montreal, Quebec, Canada | |
| 21 | Win | 19–1–1 | (United States) Bruce Runkle | TKO | 2 (8), 2:50 | 27 Sep 2014 | (United States) Nathan Goff Armory, Clarksburg, West Virginia, U.S. | |
| 20 | Win | 18–1–1 | (Mexico) Juan Jesus Rivera | UD | 8 | 6 Jul 2014 | The Roadhouse, Calgary, Alberta, Canada | |
| 19 | Win | 17–1–1 | (Canada) Tebor Brosch | UD | 8 | 8 Apr 2014 | Royal York Hotel, Toronto, Ontario, Canada | |
| 18 | Win | 16–1–1 | (France) Lyes Chaibi | UD | 8 | 15 Feb 2014 | Hershey Centre, Mississauga, Ontario, Canada | |
| 17 | Loss | 15–1–1 | (Mexico) Pablo Munguia | UD | 10 | 21 Dec 2013 | Foro Polanco, Mexico City, Mexico | |
| 16 | Win | 15–0–1 | (Mexico) Cruz Antonio Flores | KO | 7 (8), 0:48 | 5 Oct 2013 | Sindicato de Taxistas, Cancún, Mexico | |
| 15 | Win | 14–0–1 | (Italy) Giuseppe Lauri | UD | 8 | 21 Jun 2013 | Chapiteau CCSE Maisonneuve, Montreal, Quebec, Canada | |
| 14 | Win | 13–0–1 | (Hungary) Lajos Munkacsi | TKO | 5 (6), 1:11 | 25 May 2013 | Bowness Sports Plex, Calgary, Alberta, Canada | |
| 13 | Win | 12–0–1 | (Canada) Julius Bunda | TKO | 7 (10) 1:43 | 9 Apr 2013 | Royal York Hotel, Toronto, Ontario, Canada | Won Vacant WBA-NABA Canada super welterweight title |
| 12 | Win | 11–0–1 | (Lithuania) Arvydas Trizno | TKO | 3 (6), 1:11 | 12 May 2012 | Hershey Centre, Mississauga, Ontario, Canada | |
| 11 | Win | 10–0–1 | (Hungary) Ferenc Zold | TKO | 5 (10), 1:40 | 6 Mar 2012 | Hilton Hotel, Toronto, Ontario, Canada | |
| 10 | Win | 9–0–1 | (Canada) Manolis Plaitis | TKO | 1 (10), 2:49 | 11 Feb 2012 | Hershey Centre, Mississauga, Ontario, Canada | Won vacant NCC welterweight title |
| 9 | Win | 8–0–1 | (Lebanon) Ahmad Cheikho | RTD | 5 (10), 3:00 | 22 Oct 2011 | Hershey Centre, Mississauga, Ontario, Canada | |
| 8 | Draw | 7–0–1 | (Canada) Tebor Brosch | MD | 10 | 19 Feb 2011 | Hershey Centre, Mississauga, Ontario, Canada | For Vacant WBA-NABA Canada welterweight title |
| 7 | Win | 7–0 | (Mexico) Johnny Navarrete | UD | 8 | 22 Oct 2010 | Moncton Lions Club, Moncton, New Brunswick, Canada | |
| 6 | Win | 6–0 | (Canada) Ryan Wagner | UD | 6 | 25 Sep 2010 | Hershey Centre, Mississauga, Ontario, Canada | |
| 5 | Win | 5–0 | (Trinidad and Tobago) Michael Springer | SD | 4 | 28 Aug 2010 | Metropolis, Montreal, Quebec, Canada | |
| 4 | Win | 4–0 | (Canada) Frank Abbiw | UD | 6 | 29 May 2010 | Festival Arena, Shediac, New Brunswick, Canada | |
| 3 | Win | 3–0 | (Mexico) Jose Leonardo Corona | UD | 6 | 3 Apr 2010 | Montreal Casino, Montreal, Quebec, Canada | |
| 2 | Win | 2–0 | (Canada) Pascal Leonard | UD | 6 | 26 Mar 2010 | Montreal Casino, Montreal, Quebec, Canada | |
| 1 | Win | 1–0 | (Canada) Todd Furler | TKO | 2 (4), 1:15 | 6 Feb 2010 | Montreal Casino, Montreal, Quebec, Canada | |
