= Ema Kozin =

Slovenian boxer (born 1998)

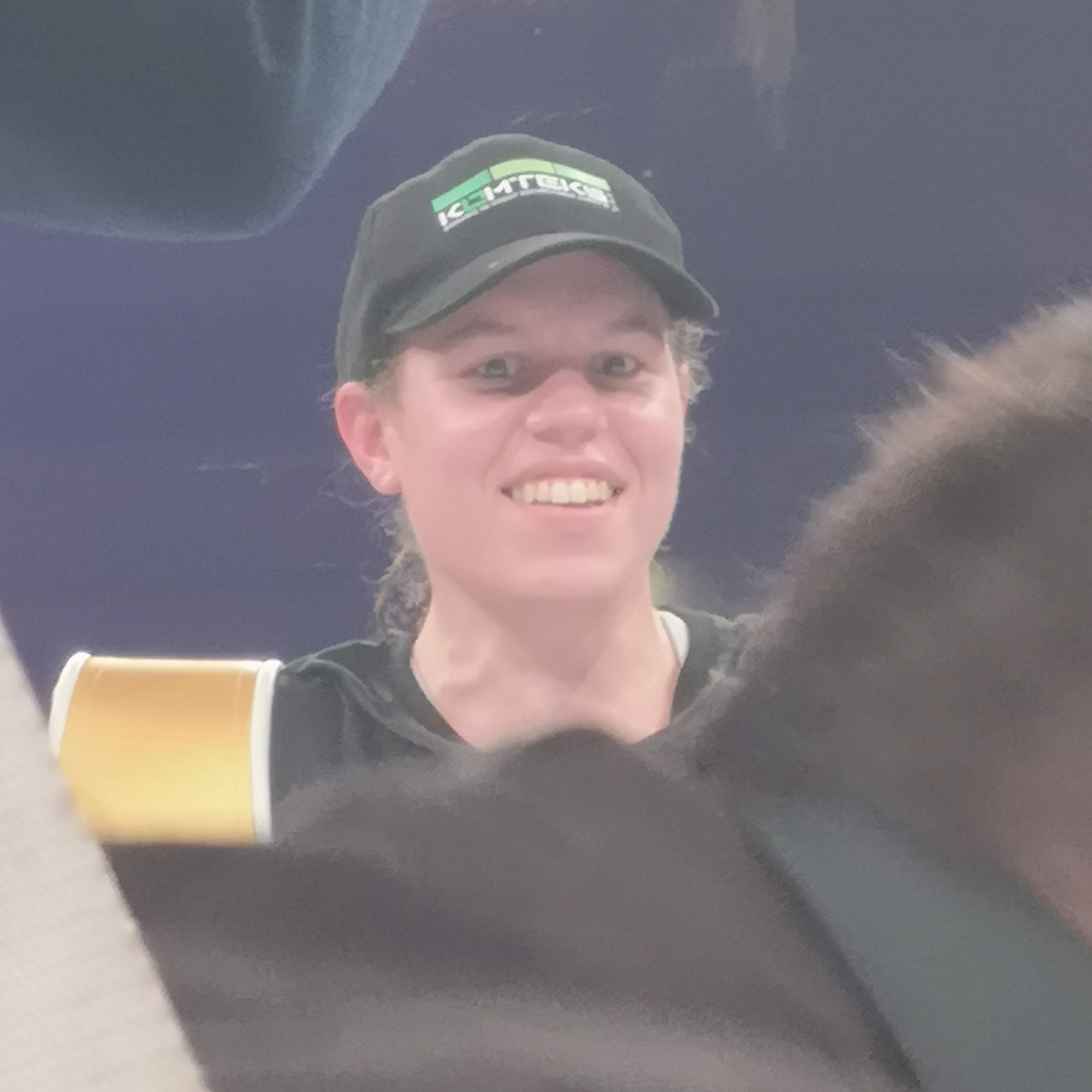
- Kozin in 2019

Personal information
- Nickname: The Princess
- Born: 2 December 1998 (age 27) Ljubljana, Slovenia
- Height: 5 ft 8 1/2 in (174 cm)
- Weight: Light middleweight; Middleweight; Super middleweight

Boxing career
- Stance: Southpaw

Boxing record
- Total fights: 27
- Wins: 24
- Win by KO: 12
- Losses: 2
- Draws: 1

Ema Kozin (born 2 December 1998) is a Slovenian professional boxer who is a former WBC and WBO female super-welterweight champion. She has also held the WBC interim female middleweight title.

== Professional career ==
Kozin made her professional debut on 24 September 2016, scoring a four-round unanimous decision (UD) victory over Ina Milohanic at the Tabor Arena in Maribor, Slovenia.

After compiling a record of 9–0 (6 KOs) she fought for her first professional title, the WBU (German) female middleweight title, facing Elene Sikmashvili on 16 September 2017 at the Sound Factory in Gersthofen, Germany. Kozin defeated Sikmashvili by UD to capture the WBU (German) title, with one judge scoring the bout 99–91 and the other two scoring it 96–93.

She collected two more titles in her next outing, defeating Florence Muthoni by UD on 14 October at the Tivoli Arena in Ljubljana, Slovenia, capturing the vacant WBC International and WBF female middleweight titles with the judges' scorecards reading 99–91, 97–93, and 96–94.

In her next fight she captured her first major world title in the women's ranks – the WIBA middleweight title – by defeating Dora Tollar via third-round technical knockout (TKO) on 15 December in Banja Luka, Bosnia and Herzegovina. At the time of the stoppage she was ahead on all three judges' scorecards at 20–18.

She successfully defended her WBF female and WIBA titles by defeating former welterweight world champion Eva Bajic via fifth-round knockout (KO) on 16 March 2018 at Remington Park in Oklahoma City, capturing the vacant GBC title in the process. She defeated Bajic in a rematch in July, winning by split decision (SD) to retain her WBF female and WIBA titles. Two judges scored the bout 97–93 and 97–94 in favour of Kozin while the third scored it 100–90 for Bajic. For both fights Kozin was originally scheduled to face Mapule Ngubane, but after the latter failed to secure a visa Bajic was brought in as a late replacement.

She moved up to super-middleweight for her next bout, fighting to a split draw against Irais Hernandez with the vacant WBC Silver and WBF female titles up for grabs on 8 September 2018 at Arena Zagreb in Croatia. One judge scored the bout 96–95 in favour of Kozin, another scored it 97–93 to Hernandez while the third judge scored it even at 95–95. The pair had an immediate rematch the following month, this time for the vacant WIBA super-middleweight title on 14 October at Technikum in Munich, Germany. Kozin settled the score with a UD victory to become a two-weight world champion. Two judges scored the bout 99–91 and the third scored it 98–92.

Five months later she made a defence of her WIBA title against Sanna Turunen, with the vacant WBF female super-middleweight title also on the line. The bout took place on 23 March 2019 at the MHPArena in Ludwigsburg, Germany. Kozin defeated Turunen via UD to become the WBF female and WIBA champion in two weight classes, simultaneously, with the judges' scorecards reading 99–91, 98–92, and 97–93.

After scoring a TKO victory against Edita Karabeg in a non-title fight in June, Kozin made a defence of her WBF female and WIBA titles against Maria Lindberg with the vacant IBA female, GBU female, and WIBF super-middleweight titles also on the line. The bout took place on 6 October 2019 at Arena Stožice in Ljubljana. Kozin added the vacant titles to her collection with a UD victory, with all three judges scoring the bout 96–94.

On 24 June 2023, Ema Kozin successfully defended her title of the world champion in the WBF super welterweight category by defeating Timea Belik from Hungary in ten 2-minute rounds in Altdorf, Germany.

Kozin defeated Scotland's Hannah Rankin for the vacant WBC and WBO female super-welterweight World titles in Manchester on 18 November 2023 winning the contest by split decision.

In her first defense, she lost the titles to Cecilia Braekhus by unanimous decision at Nova Spektrum in Lillestrøm, Norway, on 4 October 2025.

== Professional boxing record ==
27 fights	24 wins	2 losses
By knockout	12	0
By decision	12	2
Draws	1	

No.	Result	Record	Opponent	Type	Round, time	Date	Location	Notes
27	Loss	24–2–1	Cecilia Braekhus	UD	10	4 Oct 2025	Nova Spektrum, Lillestrøm, Norway	Lost WBC and WBO female light middleweight titles
26	Win	24–1–1	Hannah Rankin	SD	10	18 Nov 2023	AO Arena, Manchester, England	Won vacant WBC and WBO female light middleweight titles
25	Win	23–1–1	Timea Belik	UD	10	24 Jun 2023	Sporthalle, Alfdorf, Germany	Retained WBF female light middleweight title
24	Win	22–1–1	Szilvia Szabados	TKO	7 (10)	4 Jun 2022	Ulrich-Pfeiffer-Halle, Aalen, Germany	Won vacant WBF female light middleweight title
23	Loss	21–1–1	Claressa Shields	UD	10	5 Feb 2022	Motorpoint Arena Cardiff, Cardiff, Wales	Lost WBF female middleweight title; For WBA, WBC, IBF, and The Ring female middleweight titles
22	Win	21–0–1	Radana Knezevic	TKO	2 (6), 1:12	22 May 2021	Campus Sava, Ptuj, Slovenia	
21	Win	20–0–1	Chris Namús	UD	10	17 Oct 2020	CPI Box Club, Donauwörth, Germany	Retained WBF female and WIBA middleweight titles; Won vacant WBC interim female middleweight title
20	Win	19–0–1	Radana Knezevic	KO	1 (6), 1:40	15 Feb 2020	CPI Box Club, Donauwörth, Germany	
19	Win	18–0–1	Maria Lindberg	UD	10	6 Oct 2019	Arena Stožice, Ljubljana, Slovenia	Retained WBF female and WIBA and super-middleweight titles; Won vacant WIBF, IBA female, and GBU female super-middleweight titles
18	Win	17–0–1	Edita Karabeg	TKO	3 (8), 0:15	23 Jun 2019	Kaštel Kambelovac, Croatia	
17	Win	16–0–1	Sanna Turunen	UD	10	23 Mar 2019	MHPArena, Ludwigsburg, Germany	Retained WIBA super-middleweight title; Won vacant WBF female super-middleweight title
16	Win	15–0–1	Irais Hernandez	UD	10	14 Oct 2018	Technikum, Munich, Germany	Won vacant WIBA super-middleweight title
15	Draw	14–0–1	Irais Hernandez	SD	10	8 Sep 2018	Arena Zagreb, Zagreb, Croatia	For vacant WBC Silver and WBF female super-middleweight titles
14	Win	14–0	Eva Bajic	SD	10	8 Jul 2018	Morrison's Pub, Budapest, Hungary	Retained WBF female and WIBA middleweight titles
13	Win	13–0	Eva Bajic	KO	5 (10), 2:00	16 Mar 2018	Remington Park, Oklahoma City, Oklahoma, US	Retained WBF female and WIBA middleweight titles; Won vacant GBC female middleweight title
12	Win	12–0	Dora Tollar	TKO	3 (10)	15 Dec 2017	Banja Luka, Boshia and Herzegovina	Won vacant WIBA middleweight title
11	Win	11–0	Florence Muthoni	UD	10	14 Oct 2017	Tivoli Hall, Ljubljana, Slovenia	Won vacant WBC International and WBF female middleweight titles
10	Win	10–0	Elene Sikmashvili	UD	10	16 Sep 2017	Sound Factory, Gersthofen, Germany	Won vacant WBU (German) female middleweight title
9	Win	9–0	Divna Vujanovic	PTS	8	12 Aug 2017	Mala Buna, Croatia	
8	Win	8–0	Jelena Drakulic	TKO	4 (6)	11 Jun 2017	Rákoscsaba Művelődési Központ, Budapest, Hungary	
7	Win	7–0	Divna Vujanovic	PTS	6	13 May 2017	Kampfsportcenter, St. Gallen, Switzerland	
6	Win	6–0	Ivana Mirkov	TKO	4 (6), 0:20	1 Apr 2017	Markthalle, Burgdorf, Switzerland	
5	Win	5–0	Dalia Vasarhelyi	TKO	1 (4), 1:59	12 Mar 2017	Community Hall, Kistarcsa, Hungary	
4	Win	4–0	Klaudia Vigh	KO	3 (4), 0:39	4 Mar 2017	ASV Halle, Dachau, Germany	
3	Win	3–0	Jelena Drakulic	KO	2 (4)	11 Feb 2017	Community Hall, Kistarcsa, Hungary	
2	Win	2–0	Sanja Ristic	KO	1 (4), 1:35	22 Jan 2017	Diadal úti ált. iskola, Budapest, Hungary	
1	Win	1–0	Ina Milohanic	UD	4	24 Sep 2016	Tabor Hall, Maribor, Slovenia	

== See also ==
- List of female boxers
- List of southpaw stance boxers

Sporting positions
Major World boxing titles
New title	WBC female middleweight champion Interim title 17 October 2020 – 5 February 2022; Lost bid for full title	Vacant
Vacant Title last held by Natasha Jonas	WBC female light-middleweight champion 18 November 2023 – present	Incumbent
Vacant Title last held by Natasha Jonas	WBO female light-middleweight champion 18 November 2023 – present	Incumbent
