= Patricia Berghult =

Swedish boxer (born 1994)

Personal information
- Born: Patricia Berghult Svensson; 2 May 1994 (age 32) Malmö, Sweden
- Height: 5 ft 8 1/2 in (174 cm)
- Weight: Light welterweight; Light middleweight

Boxing career
- Stance: Orthodox

Boxing record
- Total fights: 19
- Wins: 17
- Win by KO: 4
- Losses: 2

Patricia Berghult Svensson (born 2 May 1994) is a Swedish professional boxer who is a former WBC and IBO female super-welterweight World champion.

== Professional career ==
Berghult made her professional debut on 18 December 2015, scoring a four round unanimous decision victory over Sara Marjanovic at the Rosvalla Arena in Nyköping, Sweden.

After compiling a record of 13–0 (3 KO), Berghult challenged IBO super-welterweight champion Hannah Rankin on 27 November 2019 at the Hotel Intercontinental in St. Julian's, Malta, with the vacant WBC interim title also on the line. In a fight that saw Rankin suffer a knockdown from a left hook in the first-round, Berghult won via unanimous decision over ten rounds, with the judges scoring the bout 96–93, 95–94 and 94–93.

She defeated Olivia Belkacem by unanimous decision to win the vacant WBC female super-welterweight title at SPIRA Kulturcentrum in Jönköping, Sweden, on 27 November 2021.

In her next fight, Berghult lost her title and unbeaten record to WBO female super-welterweight champion Natasha Jonas via unanimous decision at the Echo Arena in Liverpool, England, on 3 September 2022.

She challenged interim WBC female super-lightweight champion Chantelle Cameron at Resorts World Arena in Birmingham, England, on 2 November 2024, losing by unanimous decision with the three ringside judges scoring the fight 99-91, 100-90 and 98-92 for her opponent.

== Professional boxing record ==
19 fights	17 wins	2 losses
By knockout	4	0
By decision	13	2

No.	Result	Record	Opponent	Type	Round, time	Date	Location	Notes
19	Loss	17–2	Chantelle Cameron	UD	10	2 Nov 2024	Resorts World Arena, Birmingham, England	For interim WBC light-welterweight title
18	Win	17–1	Vaida Masiokaite	UD	6	7 Sep 2024	Safiren Konferenscenter, Katrineholm, Sweden	
17	Win	16–1	Maria Elena Maderna	RTD	3 (6)	4 Mar 2023	Tegelbruket, Orebro, Sweden	
16	Loss	15–1	Natasha Jonas	UD	10	3 Sep 2022	Echo Arena, Liverpool, England	Lost WBC light-middleweight title; For WBO light-middleweight title
15	Win	15–0	Olivia Belkacem	UD	10	27 Nov 2021	Spira Cultural Center, Jönköping, Sweden	Won vacant WBC light-middleweight title
14	Win	14–0	Hannah Rankin	UD	10	27 Nov 2019	Hotel Intercontinental, St. Julian's, Malta	Won IBO and WBC interim light-middleweight titles
13	Win	13–0	Borislava Goranova	UD	6	21 Sep 2019	Qazim Dervishi Sports Palace, Shkodër, Albania	
12	Win	12–0	Mariam Tatunashvili	UD	6	16 Mar 2019	Tegelbruket, Örebro, Sweden	
11	Win	11–0	Yamila Belen Abellaneda	UD	8	10 Nov 2018	Tegelbruket, Örebro, Sweden	
10	Win	10–0	Dora Tollar	TKO	1 (6)	7 Apr 2018	Arbisteatern, Norrköping, Sweden	
9	Win	9–0	Sylwia Maksym	UD	6	25 Nov 2017	Tegelbruket, Örebro, Sweden	
8	Win	8–0	Aleksandra Vujovic	UD	6	10 Jun 2017	Nattklubb Harry's, Jönköping, Sweden	
7	Win	7–0	Mirjana Vujic	TKO	1 (6)	22 Apr 2017	Sporthallen, Sundsvall, Sweden	
6	Win	6–0	Karina Kopinska	SD	6	18 Mar 2017	Baltiska Hallen, Malmö, Sweden	
5	Win	5–0	Monika Antonik	UD	6	9 Dec 2016	Rosvalla Arena, Nyköping, Sweden	
4	Win	4–0	Lela Terashvili	UD	6	15 Oct 2016	Arena Nord, Frederikshavn, Denmark	
3	Win	3–0	Kinga Magyar	TKO	1 (4)	10 Sep 2016	Hovet, Stockholm, Sweden	
2	Win	2–0	Katarina Vistica	UD	4	23 Apr 2016	Stockholm, Sweden	
1	Win	1–0	Sara Marjanovic	UD	4	19 Dec 2015	Rosvalla Arena, Nyköping, Sweden	

== See also ==
- List of female boxers

Sporting positions
Minor world boxing titles
Preceded by Hannah Rankin	IBO light-middleweight champion 27 November 2019 – 2021; Vacated	Vacant Title next held by Hannah Rankin
Major world boxing titles
Vacant Title last held by Inna Sagaydakovskaya	WBC light-middleweight champion Interim title 27 November 2019 – 2021; Vacated	Vacant Title next held by Cecilia Brækhus
Vacant Title last held by Claressa Shields	WBC light-middleweight champion 27 November 2021 –3 September 2022	Succeeded by Natasha Jonas
