= Hannah Rankin =

British boxer (born 1990)

Personal information
- Nickname: The Classical Warrior
- Born: 21 July 1990 (age 36) Luss, Argyll and Bute, Scotland
- Height: 5 ft 8 in (173 cm)
- Weight: Light-middleweight; Middleweight; Super-middleweight; Super-welterweight

Boxing career
- Stance: Orthodox

Boxing record
- Total fights: 21
- Wins: 13
- Win by KO: 3
- Losses: 8

Hannah Rankin (born 21 July 1990) is a Scottish professional boxer and bare-knuckle boxer. In boxing she has held the WBA and IBO female super-welterweight World titles.

== Early life ==
Hannah Rankin was born on 21 July 1990 and grew up on her family's Edentaggart farm in Luss, Argyll and Bute. As a child, she attended Hermitage Academy in Helensburgh, Dunbartonshire, and gained an interest in contact sports at aged nine after enrolling in taekwondo classes with her younger sister. Aside from sports she also had an interest in music, learning to play the flute at school and eventually switching to the bassoon. As an accomplished bassoonist, she attended the Royal Conservatoire of Scotland in Glasgow, and later the Royal Academy of Music in London, where she earned a master's degree in 2016. She continues her musical career alongside boxing, teaching music to children and performing in her quintet "Coriolis" at care homes and schools.

== Professional boxing career ==
Rankin made her professional debut on 21 May 2017, against Ester Konecna at the SkyLark Hotel in Essex, England, winning via points decision (PTS) over six rounds. She fought a further three times in 2017; a points decision win over Borislava Goranova in September; a split decision (SD) loss to Joanna Ekedahl in October; and a points decision win in a rematch with Ester Konecna in November.

She started 2018 with a first-round technical knockout (TKO) win over Klaudia Vigh in January, before facing Sarah Turunen for her first professional title on 16 June 2018, at the Lagoon Leisure Centre in Paisley, Scotland. Rankin won via unanimous decision (100–90, 100–91, 99–91) over ten rounds to capture the vacant WBC Silver female middleweight title.

Two months later, she made her first attempt at a world title on 4 August 2018, challenging reigning world champion Alicia Napoleon for the WBA female super-middleweight title at the Nassau Coliseum in Uniondale, New York. Rankin lost by unanimous decision with one judge scoring the bout 99–91, and the other two scoring it 98–92, all in favour of Napoleon.

In her next fight, Rankin made a second attempt at world honours on 17 November 2018, against two-time Olympic gold medalist and reigning unified WBA and IBF female middleweight champion, Claressa Shields, with the vacant WBC title also up for grabs. The bout took place at the Kansas Star Arena in Mulvane, Kansas. Shields was originally scheduled to face undefeated WBO middleweight champion Christina Hammer, who pulled out due to illness. Rankin suffered the third loss of her professional career via unanimous decision, with all three judges scoring the bout 100–90 in a contest that many outlets described as a dominant performance by Shields.

Following a points decision win over Eva Bajic in January 2019, Rankin made a third attempt for a world title against Sarah Curran on 15 June 2019, for the vacant IBO super-welterweight title. The bout took place at the Lagoon Leisure Centre in Paisley, Scotland. Rankin scored a ten-round unanimous decision victory, with all three judges scoring the bout 96–94, to become Scotland's first female world champion. After a six-round unanimous decision win over Erin Toughill in a non-title bout in October, Rankin made the first defence of her title against undefeated WBC interim champion Patricia Berghult on 27 November 2019, at the Hotel Intercontinental in St. Julian's, Malta. In a fight that saw Rankin dropped in the first-round by a left hook, she lost her IBO title by unanimous decision over ten rounds. Two judges scored the bout 96–93 while the third scored it 95–94, all in favour of Berghult.

Rankin regained the vacant IBO title and claimed the vacant WBA female super-welterweight World belt with a unanimous decision win over Maria Lindberg in London on 5 November 2021.

In her second defense of the titles, Rankin suffered a unanimous decision loss to England's Terri Harper in Nottingham on 24 September 2022.

Rankin attempted to become a three-time world champion when she took on Slovenia's Ema Kozin for the vacant WBC and WBO female super-welterweight titles in Manchester on 18 November 2023 but lost by split decision.

== Bare-knuckle boxing career ==
In October 2024, it was announced that Rankin had signed for the Conor McGregor supported Bare Knuckle Fighting Championship (BKFC). She made her debut for the promotion at BKFC on DAZN: Tenaglia vs. Soto in Marbella, Spain, on 12 October 2024, with a five-round split decision win over Deborah Melhorn. Two ringside judges gave Rankin the fight 49-46 while the third scored it for Melhorn 48-47.

Rankin faced Jessica Borga for the inaugural BKFC Women's Featherweight Championship at BKFC 72 Dubai: Day 2 on April 5, 2025 at the Dubai Tennis Stadium in Dubai, UAE. She lost the fight by knockout in the first round.

== Professional boxing record ==
| 21 fights | 13 wins | 8 losses |
|---|---|---|
| By knockout | 3 | 1 |
| By decision | 10 | 7 |

| No. | Result | Record | Opponent | Type | Round, time | Date | Location | Notes |
|---|---|---|---|---|---|---|---|---|
| 21 | Loss | 13–8 | Naomi Mannes | SD | 8 | 26 April 2024 | Knowsley Leisure and Culture Park, Huyton, England | |
| 20 | Loss | 13–7 | Ema Kozin | SD | 10 | 18 November 2023 | Manchester Arena, Manchester, England | Lost challenge for the vacant WBC and WBO female super-welterweight titles |
| 19 | Win | 13–6 | Logan Holler | PTS | 10 | 10 March 2023 | The Hangar Events Venue, Wolverhampton, England | |
| 18 | Loss | 12–6 | Terri Harper | UD | 10 | 25 Sept 2022 | Nottingham Arena, Nottingham, England | Lost WBA and IBO super-welterweight titles |
| 17 | Win | 12–5 | Alejandra Ayala | TKO | 10 (10) 1:15 | 13 May 2022 | The SSE Hydro, Glasgow, Scotland | Retained WBA and IBO super-welterweight titles |
| 16 | Win | 11–5 | Maria Lindberg | UD | 10 | 5 Nov 2021 | Tottenham Hotspur Stadium, London, England | Won vacant WBA and IBO super-welterweight titles |
| 15 | Win | 10–5 | Kholosa Ndobayini | PTS | 8 | 12 Mar 2021 | Pollsmoor Prison Hall, Cape Town, South Africa | |
| 14 | Loss | 9–5 | Savannah Marshall | TKO | 7 (10), 1:59 | 31 Oct 2020 | The SSE Arena, London, England | For vacant WBO female middleweight title |
| 13 | Win | 9–4 | Eva Bajic | TKO | 3 (8), 1:51 | 8 Feb 2020 | Lagoon Leisure Center, Paisley, Scotland | |
| 12 | Loss | 8–4 | Patricia Berghult | UD | 10 | 27 Nov 2019 | Hotel Intercontinental, St. Julian's, Malta | Lost IBO female super-welterweight title; For WBC interim female super-welterweight title |
| 11 | Win | 8–3 | Erin Toughill | UD | 6 | 5 Oct 2019 | Dort Federal Event Center, Flint, Michigan, US | |
| 10 | Win | 7–3 | Sarah Curran | UD | 10 | 15 Jun 2019 | Lagoon Leisure Centre, Paisley, Scotland | Won vacant IBO female super-welterweight title |
| 9 | Win | 6–3 | Eva Bajic | PTS | 8 | 25 Jan 2019 | Crowne Plaza Hotel, Glasgow, Scotland | |
| 8 | Loss | 5–3 | Claressa Shields | UD | 10 | 17 Nov 2018 | Kansas Star Arena, Mulvane, Kansas, US | For WBA, IBF, and vacant WBC female middleweight titles |
| 7 | Loss | 5–2 | Alicia Napoleon | UD | 10 | 4 Aug 2018 | Nassau Coliseum, Uniondale, New York, US | For WBA female super-middleweight title |
| 6 | Win | 5–1 | Sanna Turunen | UD | 10 | 16 Jun 2018 | Lagoon Leisure Centre, Paisley, Scotland | Won vacant WBC Silver female middleweight title |
| 5 | Win | 4–1 | Klaudia Vigh | TKO | 1 (8), 0:59 | 26 Jan 2018 | Crowne Plaza Hotel, Glasgow, Scotland | |
| 4 | Win | 3–1 | Ester Konecna | PTS | 8 | 10 Nov 2017 | York Hall, London, England | |
| 3 | Loss | 2–1 | Joanna Ekedahl | SD | 4 | 21 Oct 2017 | Oslofjord Convention Center, Stokke, Norway | |
| 2 | Win | 2–0 | Borislava Goranova | PTS | 6 | 22 Sep 2017 | Westcroft Leisure Centre, London, England | |
| 1 | Win | 1–0 | Ester Konecna | PTS | 6 | 21 May 2017 | SkyLark Hotel, Southend, England | |

== Bare-knuckle boxing record ==
Professional record breakdown
| 2 matches | 1 win | 1 loss |
| By knockout | 0 | 1 |
| By decision | 1 | 0 |

| Res. | Record | Opponent | Method | Event | Date | Round | Time | Location | Notes |
|---|---|---|---|---|---|---|---|---|---|
| Loss | 1–1 | Jessica Borga | KO | BKFC 72 Dubai: Day 2 | April 5, 2025 | 1 | 0:32 | Dubai, United Arab Emirates | For the inaugural BKFC Women's Featherweight Championship. |
| Win | 1–0 | Deborah Melhorn | Decision (split) | BKFC on DAZN: Tenaglia vs. Soto | October 12, 2024 | 5 | 2:00 | Marbella, Spain | |

Sporting positions
Minor world boxing titles
| Vacant Title last held by Kelly Morgan | WBC Silver female middleweight champion 16 June 2018 – November 2018; Fought for full title | Vacant |
| Vacant Title last held by Mikaela Laurén | IBO female super-welterweight champion 15 June 2019 – 27 November 2019 | Succeeded by Patricia Berghult |
