= Natasha Jonas =

British boxer (born 1984)

Natasha Jonas MBE
Personal information
- Born: Natasha Jonas; 18 June 1984 (age 42) Liverpool, England
- Height: 5 ft 8 in (173 cm)
- Weight: Super featherweight; Lightweight; Welterweight; Super welterweight
- Website: natashajonas.co.uk

Boxing career
- Stance: Southpaw

Boxing record
- Total fights: 20
- Wins: 16
- Win by KO: 9
- Losses: 3
- Draws: 1
Medal record
Women's amateur boxing
Representing Great Britain
World Championships
Bronze medal – third place	2012 Qinhuangdao	Lightweight
European Championships
Silver medal – second place	2014 Bucharest	Light-welterweight
Bronze medal – third place	2011 Rotterdam	Light-welterweight

Natasha Jonas (born 18 June 1984) is a British professional boxer is a two weight world champion who held the unified WBC, and WBO female light-middleweight titles between 2022 and 2025. As an amateur, she won a bronze medal in the light-welterweight division at the 2011 European Championships; bronze in the lightweight division at the 2012 AIBA World Championships; and silver in the light-welterweight division at the 2014 European Championships.

== Amateur career ==
Jonas took up boxing in 2005 and by 2010 she had won five ABA Championships in the 64 kg Division for Liverpool club Rotunda ABC. In 2009 she became the first female boxer to compete for GB Boxing. In the same year she claimed gold in the 64 kg division at the 2009 Women's European Union Amateur Boxing Championships in Pazardzhik, Bulgaria, after she overcame Csilla Csejtei of Hungary in the final. Jonas another gold medal in the inaugural GB Amateur Boxing Championships in 2010, when she pipped rival Amanda Coulson by one point in an exciting bout in front of her home fans at Liverpool's Echo Arena.

=== 2012 AIBA Women's World Amateur Boxing Championships ===
Jonas made history in Qinhuangdao, China in May 2012, when she reached the semi-finals of the 2012 AIBA Women's World Boxing Championships to become the first ever female British boxer to qualify for an Olympic Games, she then went on to take the bronze medal and a place in the 2012 London Olympics back to Liverpool with her.

=== 2012 Olympic Games ===
Jonas became the first ever British female boxer to compete at an Olympic Games. Jonas faced Quanitta Underwood of the United States in the round of 16, Jonas emphatically beat Underwood, 21:13 winning three of the four rounds boxed. Her wins set up a quarter-final bout with four-time World Champion, and Ireland's flag-bearer at the Opening Ceremony, Katie Taylor. Jonas lost heavily to Taylor 26:15.

== Professional career ==
Jonas made her professional boxing debut against Monika Antonik at the Walker Activity Dome in Newcastle, England, on 23 June 2017, winning by stoppage just 92 seconds into the first round.

In her 11th pro-fight, she challenged WBC and IBO female super-featherweight champion Terri Harper at Matchroom Headquarters in Brentwood, England, on 7 August 2020, with the bout ending in a split draw. One ringside judge scored the contest 96-94 for Harper, one had it 96-95 for Jonas and the third gave it as a 95-95 tie.

Switching weights, Jonas took on unified female lightweight champion Katie Taylor in her next outing at the AO Arena in Manchester, England, on 1 May 2021, losing by unanimous decision with two of the ringside judges giving the fight to her opponent 96-95 and the third seeing the contest as 96-94.

Again changing weight divisions, she won her first professional world title at her third attempt by stopping Chris Namús in round two of their fight for the vacant WBO female super-welterweight championship at Echo Arena in Liverpool, England, on 19 February 2022.

In her next bout, and at the same venue, Jonas became a unified world champion by defeating WBC female super-welterweight title holder Patricia Berghult via unanimous decision on 3 September 2022.

She added the IBF and The Ring female super-welterweight titles to her collection with a unanimous decision win over Marie-Eve Dicaire at the AO Arena in Manchester on 12 November 2022.

Jonas was named the British Boxing Board of Control's British Boxer of the Year for 2022, becoming the first woman to win the accolade.

She became a two-weight world champion on 1 July 2023, when she stopped Kandi Wyatt in round eight of their fight at the AO Arena in Manchester, England, to claim the vacant IBF female welterweight belt.

Back at Liverpool's Echo Arena, Jonas retained her title with a split decision win over Mikaela Mayer on 20 January 2024. Two of the ringside judges gave her the bout 96-94, 96-95 respectively, with the other scoring it 97-93 to her opponent.

She became a unified world champion for a second time by defeating WBC female welterweight title holder Ivana Habazin via unanimous decision at the Exhibition Centre, Liverpool, England, on 14 December 2024.

Jonas was scheduled to face WBA, IBO and The Ring female welterweight champion Lauren Price at the Royal Albert Hall in London, England, on 7 March 2025. Jonas lost the fight by unanimous decision.

== Professional boxing record ==
20 fights	16 wins	3 losses
By knockout	9	1
By decision	7	2
By disqualification	0	0
Draws	1	

No.	Result	Record	Opponent	Type	Round, time	Date	Location	Notes
20	Loss	16–3–1	Lauren Price	UD	10	7 Mar 2025	Royal Albert Hall, London, England	Lost IBF and WBC female welterweight titles; For WBA female welterweight title
19	Win	16–2–1	Ivana Habazin	UD	10	14 Dec 2024	Exhibition Centre, Liverpool, England	Retained IBF female welterweight title; Won WBC female welterweight title
18	Win	15–2–1	Mikaela Mayer	SD	10	20 Jan 2024	Echo Arena, Liverpool, England	Retained IBF female welterweight title
17	Win	14–2–1	Kandi Wyatt	TKO	8 (10)	1 Jul 2023	AO Arena, Manchester, England	Won vacant IBF female welterweight title
16	Win	13–2–1	Marie-Eve Dicaire	UD	10	12 Nov 2022	AO Arena, Manchester, England	Retained WBC and WBO female light-middleweight titles Won IBF, and The Ring female light-middleweight titles
15	Win	12–2–1	Patricia Berghult	UD	10	3 Sep 2022	Echo Arena, Liverpool, England	Retained WBO female light-middleweight title; Won WBC female light-middleweight title
14	Win	11–2–1	Chris Namús	TKO	2 (10), 0:28	19 Feb 2022	AO Arena, Manchester, England	Won vacant WBO female light-middleweight title
13	Win	10–2–1	Vaida Masiokaite	UD	6	20 Nov 2021	Wembley Arena, Wembley, England	
12	Loss	9–2–1	Katie Taylor	UD	10	1 May 2021	AO Arena, Manchester, England	For WBA, WBC, IBF, WBO, and The Ring female lightweight titles
11	Draw	9–1–1	Terri Harper	SD	10	7 Aug 2020	Matchroom Headquarters, Brentwood, England	For WBC and IBO female super-featherweight titles
10	Win	9–1	Bianka Majlath	TKO	2 (6), 0:30	15 Nov 2019	Liverpool Olympia, Liverpool, England	
9	Win	8–1	Bec Connolly	TKO	4 (6), 1:07	12 Jul 2019	Liverpool Olympia, Liverpool, England	
8	Win	7–1	Feriche Mashauri	PTS	6	30 Mar 2019	Echo Arena, Liverpool, England	
7	Loss	6–1	Viviane Obenauf	TKO	4 (10), 1:42	4 Aug 2018	Ice Arena Wales, Cardiff, Wales	Lost WBA International female super-featherweight title
6	Win	6–0	Taoussy L'Hadji	TKO	7 (10), 1:44	21 Apr 2018	Echo Arena, Liverpool, England	Won vacant WBA International female super-featherweight title
5	Win	5–0	Karina Kopinska	PTS	6	25 Feb 2018	Victoria Warehouse Hotel, Manchester, England	
4	Win	4–0	Katarina Vistica	TKO	2 (6), 1:21	16 Dec 2017	Leisure Centre, Oldham, England	
3	Win	3–0	Marianna Gulyas	TKO	3 (6), 1:23	13 Oct 2017	York Hall, London, England	
2	Win	2–0	Bojana Libiszewska	TKO	4 (4), 1:17	30 Sep 2017	Echo Arena, Liverpool, England	
1	Win	1–0	Monika Antonik	TKO	1 (4), 1:32	23 Jun 2017	Walker Activity Dome, Newcastle, England	

== Manager ==
In 2023, Jonas became the first black woman to receive a manager's license from the British Boxing Board of Control.

== Personal life ==
Initially intending to be a footballer, Jonas spent eighteen months at St. Peter's College in the United States on a football scholarship. After suffering an injury that ended her football career, she returned to the United Kingdom and studied media studies at Edge Hill University, Lancashire. She was employed for five years by Liverpool City Council and was a mentor for the Youth Sport Trust for four years, helping to promote sport and healthy lifestyles to school-age children.

Jonas is an older sister of footballer Nikita Parris.

Jonas was appointed Member of the Order of the British Empire (MBE) in the 2025 Birthday Honours for services to boxing to the community in Liverpool.

== In the media ==
In July 2012, Jonas appeared alongside Tom Stalker and Jazza Dickens in Channel 4 documentary, Knockout Scousers, which followed her to Czech Republic and China on her pursuit for Olympic qualification, a production which she also narrated. In August 2023, Jonas during her tour in Tanzania she appeared in Azam TV, where she shared her experience and motivated female local amateur boxers to encounter challenges they face in their careers towards substantial achievements in the sport.

A mural of her is in Liverpool, on Elwy Street off High Park Street, near the home she lived in as a child.

== See also ==
- List of female boxers
- List of southpaw stance boxers

Sporting positions
World boxing titles
Vacant Title last held by Claressa Shields	WBO female light-middleweight champion 19 February 2022 – 2023; Vacated	Vacant Title next held by Ema Kozin
Preceded by Patricia Berghult	WBC female light-middleweight champion 3 September 2022 – 2023; Vacated	Vacant Title next held by Ema Kozin
Preceded by Marie-Eve Dicaire	IBF female light-middleweight champion 12 November 2022 – 2023; Vacated	Vacant Title next held by Femke Hermans
Vacant Title last held by Claressa Shields	The Ring female light-middleweight champion 12 November 2022 – present	Incumbent
Vacant Title last held by Jessica McCaskill	IBF female welterweight champion 1 July 2023 – present	Incumbent
