= Maria Lindberg =

Swedish boxer (born 1977)

Personal information
- Nationality: Swedish
- Born: 30 March 1977 (age 49) Malmö, Sweden
- Height: 5 ft 6 in (168 cm)
- Weight: Light-middleweight; Middleweight; Super-middleweight

Boxing career
- Stance: Orthodox

Boxing record
- Total fights: 32
- Wins: 20
- Win by KO: 10
- Losses: 9
- Draws: 2
- No contests: 1

Maria Camilla Lindberg (born 30 March 1977) is a Swedish professional boxer who has held the WIBF light-middleweight title since 2009. She previously held the WIBA light-middleweight title from 2010 to 2014 and has challenged for multiple world titles, including the WBO female middleweight title in 2011 and April 2021; the unified WBC and WBO female middleweight titles in 2017; and the WBC and IBF female light-middleweight titles in 2018 and 2019, respectively.

== Professional career ==
After suffering a brain hemorrhage in an amateur bout in 1999, Lindberg received a life-time ban from boxing by the Swedish Boxing Federation. Unable to acquire a boxing license in Sweden, she moved to the US and began training at the Gleason's Gym in New York City. Lindberg made her professional debut on 1 July 2003, scoring a four-round unanimous decision (UD) victory against Katherin Pugh at the Omni New Daisy Theater in Memphis, Tennessee. Following her second fight–a draw against Ann Saccurato in May 2004–Lindberg was suspended by the American Association of Boxing Commissions and the European Boxing Union due to the brain injury she suffered in 1999. After four years out of the ring, she passed medical tests for the Bund Deutscher Berufsboxer (BDB) and received a license to box in Germany, making her return to the ring on 28 November 2008, scoring a majority decision (MD) victory against Pia Porter at the Maritim Hotel in Magdeburg.

In her next fight she fought for her first world title, facing Conjestina Achieng for the vacant WIBF middleweight title on 8 May 2009, at the Royal Event Center in Berlin. The bout ended in a split draw, with one judge scoring the bout 97–96 in favour of Lindberg, the second judge scoring it 97–95 for Achieng, while the third judge scored it even at 95–95, leaving the WIBF title vacant.

Lindberg moved down a weight class for her next fight, defeating Sara Davis via ten-round UD to capture the vacant WIBF light-middleweight on 19 September, at the Dampfnudel Arena in Rülzheim, Germany, with the judges scorecards reading 100–92, 99–91 and 98–92.

After successfully defending her title with a technical knockout (TKO) victory against Michaela Dragan in July 2010, Lindberg defeated Diane Schwachhofer via UD on 20 November, capturing the vacant WIBA light-middleweight title in Aachen, Germany.

She moved up in weight for her next fight, challenging WBO and WBF female middleweight champion Christina Hammer on 27 May 2011, at the Zlatopramen Arena in Ústí nad Labem, Czech Republic. Lindberg suffered the first defeat of her career, losing via UD.

Following three victories in non-title fights, she successfully defended her WIBA and WIBF titles with a third-round TKO against Edita Karabeg in May 2014, before making a defence against Mirjana Vujic on 1 November at the Aktionshalle Offerta in Karlsruhe, with the vacant GBU female title also on the line. The fight was initially ruled a no contest after the referee determined that Vujic was knocked out by an accidental clash of heads. However, upon review, the BDB changed the result to a TKO, awarding Lindberg her third world title. The pair had an immediate rematch on 13 December, with Lindberg emerging victorious with a fourth-round TKO.

After five more fights, with four wins and one no contest, she faced Christina Hammer in a rematch of their 2011 contest. The bout took place on 1 April 2017, at the Westfalenhallen in Dortmund, Germany, with Hammer's unified WBC and WBO female middleweight titles on the line. Lindberg suffered the second defeat of her career, losing via UD with all three judges scoring the bout 100–90.

She suffered another defeat in her next fight, losing via UD against Inna Sagaydakovskaya for the vacant WBC Silver female light-middleweight title on 29 September, at the Pabellón Municipal de Deportes La Casilla in Bilbao, Spain. The judges scorecards read 97–92, 97–92, and 96–93.

Her next fight was a successful defence of her WIBF and GBU female titles in March 2018, scoring a third-round stoppage against Lela Terashvili, before challenging Ewa Piątkowska for the WBC female light-middleweight title. The bout took place on 25 May at the Stadion Narodowy in Warsaw, Poland. Lindberg was unsuccessful in her third attempt at a major world title, losing via MD. Two judges scored the bout 96–94 while the third judge scored it 95–95.

After a UD victory against Mariam Tatunashvili in a non-title fight in April 2019, Lindberg challenged Marie-Eve Dicaire for the IBF female light-middleweight title on 28 June at the Montreal Casino in Canada. Lindberg suffered the fifth defeat of her career, losing via UD with the judges' scorecards reading 99–91, 99–91, and 98–92.

Following a TKO victory in a rematch against Edita Karabeg in August, Lindberg moved up to the super-middleweight division to challenge WIBA and WBF female champion Ema Kozin, with the vacant WIBF, GBU, and IBA female titles also on the line. The bout took place on 6 October at the Arena Stožice in Ljubljana, Slovenia. In what some media outlets viewed as a controversial decision, Lindberg suffered her sixth career defeat, losing via UD with the judges' scorecards reading 98–94, 96–94, and 96–94.

On 8 April 2021, it was announced that Lindberg would face WBO female middleweight champion Savannah Marshall on 10 April, at the Copper Box Arena in London, England. Lindberg was brought in as a late replacement after Marshall's original opponent, Femke Hermans, was forced to withdraw after a member of her team tested positive for COVID-19. On the night, Lindberg was knocked to the canvas in the second round after Marshall landed a right hand. She managed to make it back to her feet before the referee's count of ten to see out the remainder of the round. She was knocked down for a second time in the third round, again by a right hand, but failed to beat the count. It was Lindberg's only ever knockout (KO) defeat.

== Professional boxing record ==
32 fights	20 wins	9 losses
By knockout	10	2
By decision	10	7
Draws	2	
No contests	1	

No.	Result	Record	Opponent	Type	Round, time	Date	Location	Notes
32	Loss	20–9–2 (1)	(Belgium) Femke Hermans	RTD	1 (10), 3:00	17 Jun 2023	Alfasun Indoor Arena, Roosdaal, Belgium	For IBO female super welterweight title
31	Win	20–8–2 (1)	(Croatia) Katarina Vistica	UD	6	17 Sep 2022	Sporthalle, Dorf Mecklenburg, Germany	
30	Loss	19–8–2 (1)	(United Kingdom) Hannah Rankin	UD	10	5 Nov 2021	(United Kingdom) Tottenham Hotspur Stadium, London, England	For vacant WBA and IBO super welterweight titles
29	Loss	19–7–2 (1)	(United Kingdom) Savannah Marshall	KO	3 (10), 1:11	10 Apr 2021	(United Kingdom) Copper Box Arena, London, England	For WBO female middleweight title
28	Win	19–6–2 (1)	(Georgia (country)) Mariam Tatunashvili	UD	10	18 Apr 2020	Congress Centrum, Oberhausen, Germany	
27	Loss	18–6–2 (1)	(Slovenia) Ema Kozin	UD	10	6 Oct 2019	Arena Stožice, Ljubljana, Slovenia	For WIBA, WBF female, and vacant WIBF and GBU female super-middleweight titles
26	Win	18–5–2 (1)	(Bosnia and Herzegovina) Edita Karabeg	TKO	2 (6), 0:45	10 Aug 2019	Marina Frapa Resort, Rogoznica, Czech Republic	
25	Loss	17–5–2 (1)	(Canada) Marie-Eve Dicaire	UD	10	28 Jun 2019	Montreal Casino, Montreal, Quebec, Canada	For IBF female light-middleweight title
24	Win	17–4–2 (1)	(Georgia (country)) Mariam Tatunashvili	UD	6	13 Apr 2019	Hansehalle, Lübeck, Germany	
23	Loss	16–4–2 (1)	(Poland) Ewa Piątkowska	MD	10	25 May 2018	PGE Narodowy, Warsaw, Poland	For WBC female light-middleweight title
22	Win	16–3–2 (1)	(Georgia (country)) Lela Terashvili	RTD	3 (10), 2:00	3 Mar 2018	Ufgauhalle, Karlsruhe, Germany	Retained WIBF and GBU female light-middleweight titles
21	Loss	15–3–2 (1)	(Russia) Inna Sagaydakovskaya	UD	10	29 Sep 2017	Pabellón Municipal de Deportes La Casilla, Bilbao, Spain	For vacant WBC Silver female light-middleweight title
20	Loss	15–2–2 (1)	(Germany) Christina Hammer	UD	10	1 Apr 2017	Westfalenhalle, Dortmund, Germany	For WBC and WBO female middleweight titles
19	Win	15–1–2 (1)	(Bosnia and Herzegovina) Selma Music	KO	2 (6), 1:03	4 Dec 2016	Große Freiheit 36, Hamburg, Germany	
18	Win	14–1–2 (1)	(Hungary) Timea Belik	TKO	3 (6), 0:58	20 Mar 2016	Delphi Showpalast, Hamburg, Germany	
17	Win	13–1–2 (1)	(Hungary) Melinda Lázár	UD	6	26 Feb 2016	Ceres Arena, Aarhus, Denmark	
16	NC	12–1–2 (1)	(Hungary) Melinda Lázár	NC	3 (6), 2:09	25 Jul 2015	Boxsporthalle Braamkamp, Hamburg, Germany	Fight stopped after Lázár was cut from an accidental head clash
15	Win	12–1–2	(Georgia (country)) Elene Sikmashvili	TKO	2 (6), 1:20	30 May 2015	Boxsporthalle Braamkamp, Hamburg, Germany	
14	Win	11–1–2	(Serbia) Mirjana Vujic	TKO	4 (10), 1:59	13 Dec 2014	Zirkuszelt Messplatz, Karlsruhe, Germany	Retained WIBA, WIBF, and GBU female light-middleweight titles
13	Win	10–1–2	(Serbia) Mirjana Vujic	TKO	1 (10), 1:16	1 Nov 2014	Aktionshalle Offerta, Karlsruhe, Germany	Retained WIBA and WIBF light-middleweight titles; Won vacant GBU female light-middleweight title; Originally ruled a NC, result later changed after incorrect referee decision
12	Win	9–1–2	(Bosnia and Herzegovina) Edita Karabeg	TKO	3 (10), 1:43	10 May 2014	Europahalle, Karlsruhe, Germany	Retained WIBA and WIBF light-middleweight titles
11	Win	8–1–2	(Romania) Floarea Lihet	UD	6	12 Oct 2012	Sporthalle, Hamburg, Germany	
10	Win	7–1–2	(Bulgaria) Borislava Goranova	TKO	2 (6), 1:55	7 Sep 2012	Universal Hall, Berlin, Germany	
9	Win	6–1–2	(Hungary) Diana Kiss	UD	6	11 Feb 2012	Boxsporthalle Braamkamp, Hamburg, Germany	
8	Loss	5–1–2	(Germany) Christina Hammer	UD	10	27 May 2011	Zlatopramen Arena, Ústí nad Labem, Czech Republic	For WBO and WBF female middleweight titles
7	Win	5–0–2	(Belgium) Diane Schwachhofer	UD	10	20 Nov 2010	Aachen, Germany	Won vacant WIBA light-middleweight title
6	Win	4–0–2	(Romania) Michaela Dragan	TKO	3 (10), 1:50	17 Jul 2010	Rheintalhalle, Waghäusel, Germany	Retained WIBF light-middleweight title
5	Win	3–0–2	(United Kingdom) Sara Davis	UD	10	19 Sep 2009	Dampfnudel Arena, Rülzheim, Germany	Won vacant WIBF light-middleweight title
4	Draw	2–0–2	(Kenya) Conjestina Achieng	SD	10	8 May 2009	Royal Event Center, Berlin, Germany	For vacant WIBF middleweight title
3	Win	2–0–1	(Germany) Pia Porter	MD	6	28 Nov 2008	Maritim Hotel, Magdeburg, Germany	
2	Draw	1–0–1	(United States) Ann Saccurato	PTS	4	30 May 2004	(United States) DC Tunnel, Washington, DC, US	
1	Win	1–0	(United States) Katherin Pugh	UD	4	1 Jul 2003	(United States) Omni New Daisy Theater, Memphis, Tennessee, US	

Sporting positions
Minor world boxing titles
Vacant Title last held by Giselle Salandy	GBU female light-middleweight champion 1 November 2014 – present	Incumbent
Major world boxing titles
Vacant Title last held by Giselle Salandy	WIBF light-middleweight champion 19 September 2009 – present	Incumbent
Vacant Title last held by Giselle Salandy	WIBA light-middleweight champion 20 November 2010 – 2015	Vacant
