= Vergil Ortiz Jr. vs. Samuel Vargas =

Boxing competition

- Date: 24 July 2020
- Venue: Fantasy Springs Resort Casino, Indio, California, U.S.
- Title(s) on the line: WBA Gold welterweight title

Tale of the tape
Boxer	(United States) Vergil Ortiz Jr.	(Canada) / (Colombia) Samuel Vargas
Hometown	Grand Prairie, Texas, U.S.	Toronto, Ontario, Canada
Pre-fight record	15–0 (15 KO)	31–5–2 (14 KO)
Age	22 years, 3 months	31 years, 3 months
Height	5 ft 10 in (178 cm)	5 ft 9 in (175 cm)
Weight	147 lb (67 kg)	146 3/5 lb (66 kg)
Style	Orthodox	Orthodox
Recognition	WBO; No. 3 Ranked Welterweight; WBC; No. 7 Ranked Welterweight; WBA Gold welterweight champion	Former NABA welterweight champion

Result
- Ortiz Jr. wins via 7th-round technical knockout

Vergil Ortiz Jr. vs. Samuel Vargas was a professional boxing match contested on 24 July 2020.

== Background ==
The event originally scheduled for Ortiz Jr. vs Vargas on 28 March 2020 at The Forum, Inglewood, California and the unified super middleweight world titles between the current four-division champion, the Mexican Canelo Álvarez vs. the WBO champion, the British Billy Joe Saunders on 2 May 2020 at the T-Mobile Arena in Las Vegas, Nevada. But the Canelo vs. Saunders fight has been cancelled and replaced by the Ortiz Jr. vs Vargas fight in 24 July at the Fantasy Springs Resort Casino, Indio, California due to the COVID-19 pandemic.

== The fight ==
Ortiz dominated the bout behind his left jab, hurting Vargas with a series of quick right hands over the top in third, which prompted referee Jack Reiss to call the ringside physician to look him over at the end of the round. In the seventh round, a barrage of punches from Ortiz led the referee to wave the bout off. Ortiz would land 46% of his punches compared to just 15% of Vargas'.

== Aftermath ==
Canelo Álvarez and Billy Joe Saunders would face off 10 months later in Texas.

== Fight card ==
Confirmed bouts:

Weight Class	Weight		vs.		Method	Round	Time	Note
Welterweight	147 lbs.	(United States) Vergil Ortiz Jr. (c)	def.	(Colombia) Samuel Vargas	TKO	7/12		^{Note 1}
Middleweight	154 lbs.	(United States) Shane Mosley Jr.	def.	(United States) Jeremy Ramos	UD	8/8
Light Flyweight	108 lbs.	(United States) Seniesa Estrada	def.	(United States) Miranda Adkins	KO	1/8	0:07	^{Note 2}
Super bantamweight	122 lbs.	(United States) Hector Valdez	def.	(United States) Josue Morales	UD	8/8
Welterweight	147 lbs.	(United States) Evan Anthony Sanchez	def.	(Burkina Faso) Issouf Kinda	UD	6/6

^Note 1 For WBA Gold welterweight title ^Note 2 For WBC Silver female light flyweight title

== Broadcasting ==
The event will mark the OTT Streaming service DAZN launch globally in Latin America (after previously been launched in Brazil a year ago), UK, and other 189 countries after previously been launched in nine countries.

Country	Broadcaster
New Zealand	Spark Sports

Preceded by vs. Brad Solomon	Vergil Ortiz Jr.'s bouts 24 July 2020	Succeeded by vs. Maurice Hooker
Preceded by vs. Silverio Ortiz	Samuel Vargas's bouts 24 July 2020	Succeeded by vs. Conor Benn
