= Chris Namús =

Uruguayan boxer (born 1987)

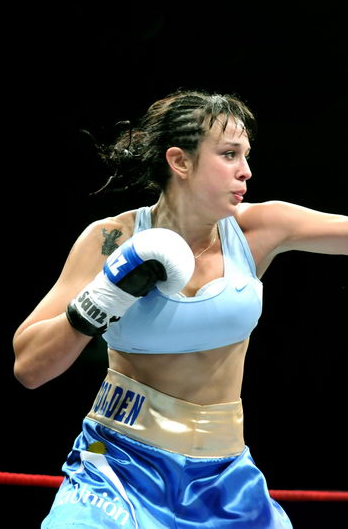
- Chris Namús

Personal information
- Nickname: El Bombon Asesino
- Born: 3 October 1987 (age 38) Montevideo, Uruguay
- Height: 5 ft 8 1/2 in (174 cm)
- Weight: Light welterweight; Welterweight; Light middleweight

Boxing career
- Stance: Orthodox

Boxing record
- Total fights: 32
- Wins: 25
- Win by KO: 8
- Losses: 6
- No contests: 1

Christian Adriana Namús Corrales (born 3 October 1987) is a Uruguayan professional boxer who held the IBF female junior middleweight title from 2017 to 2018. She also challenged for the WBC interim female light welterweight title in 2009; the WBO female light-welterweight title twice in 2011 and 2012; and the undisputed female welterweight title in 2016. As of September 2020, she is ranked as the world's fifth best active female junior middleweight by The Ring and BoxRec.

== Career ==
Namús made her professional debut on 18 May 2007, scoring a four-round unanimous decision (UD) victory against Maria Eugenia Lopez at the Palacio Peñarol in Montevideo, Uruguay.

After compiling a record of 9–0 (2 KOs) she faced Lely Luz Flórez for the WBC interim female light welterweight title on 8 August 2009 at the Palacio Peñarol. Namús suffered her first professional defeat, losing via first-round technical knockout (TKO).

Two years later, after nine fights with eight wins (five by stoppage) and one no contest, she fought for her first full world title—the WBO female light welterweight title—against reigning champion Fernanda Soledad Alegre on 17 December 2011 at the Parque Municipal Eva Perón in Lomas de Zamora, Argentina. After struggling to gain a foothold in the first half of the fight, Namús began to take control in the latter half. The judges deemed the effort too little, too late, with two scoring the bout 97–93 and the third scoring it 98–92, all in favour of Alegre, handing Namús the second defeat of her career.

The pair had an immediate rematch four months later in April 2012. Alegre again won by UD, a result that was criticised by the commentary team for the Argentine broadcasters, TyC Sports. The three judges scored the bout 97–92, 96–93, and 95–94.

Following the consecutive defeats to Alegre, Namús scored five wins, one by knockout (KO), before facing the reigning undisputed welterweight champion Cecilia Brækhus for the WBA, WBC, IBF, WBO, and vacant IBO female titles. The bout took place on 27 February 2016 at the Gerry Weber Stadion in Halle, Germany. Namús suffered the fourth defeat of her career, losing by a shutout UD with all three judges scoring the bout 100–90.

After a six-round UD victory against Marisa Nuñez in April 2017, Namús faced Yamila Reynoso for the vacant IBF female junior middleweight title on 12 August at the Palacio Peñarol. In a fight which saw Reynosa receive a point deduction for use of her head, Namús captured the vacant IBF title with a wide UD victory, with the three judges' scorecards reading 100–89, 99–90, and 98–91.

She retained her title with a UD victory against Katia Alvariño in October 2017 before facing Marie-Eve Dicaire on 1 December 2018 at the Videotron Centre in Quebec City, Canada. After the ten rounds were complete Namús lost her title via UD in her second defence, with two judges scoring the bout 97–93 and the third scoring it 96–94.

Namús lost her title to Marie-Eve Dicaire on 1 December 2018, at the Videotron Center in Quebec City, Canada, going down to a unanimous decision defeat.

She fought Natasha Jonas for the vacant WBO female super-welterweight championship at Echo Arena in Liverpool, England, on 19 February 2022, losing by stoppage in the second round.

== Professional record ==
33 fights	25 wins	7 losses
By knockout	8	2
By decision	17	5
No contests	1	

No.	Result loss	Record	Opponent	Type	Round, time	Date	Location	Notes
33	Loss	25–7 (1)	(United Kingdom) Natasha Jonas	TKO	2 (10), 0:28	19 Feb 2022	(United Kingdom) AO Arena, Manchester, England	For vacant WBO female junior middleweight title
32	Loss	25–6 (1)	(Slovenia) Ema Kozin	UD	10	17 Oct 2020	CPI Box Club, Donauwörth, Germany	For WIBA, WBF female, and vacant WBC interim female middleweight titles
31	Win	25–5 (1)	(Argentina) Yamila Esther Reynoso	UD	6	26 Apr 2019	Club Salto Uruguayo, Salto, Uruguay	
30	Loss	24–5 (1)	(Canada) Marie-Eve Dicaire	UD	10	1 Dec 2018	Videotron Centre, Quebec City, Quebec, Canada	Lost IBF female junior middleweight title
29	Win	24–4 (1)	(Uruguay) Katia Alvariño	UD	10	21 Oct 2017	Palacio Peñarol, Montevideo, Uruguay	Retained IBF female junior middleweight title
28	Win	23–4 (1)	(Argentina) Yamila Esther Reynoso	UD	10	12 Aug 2017	Palacio Peñarol, Montevideo, Uruguay	Won vacant IBF female junior middleweight title
27	Win	22–4 (1)	(Argentina) Marisa Gabriela Núñez	UD	6	13 Apr 2017	Club Plaza Colonia, Colonia del Sacramento, Uruguay	
26	Loss	21–4 (1)	(Norway) Cecilia Brækhus	UD	10	27 Feb 2016	Gerry Weber Stadion, Halle, Germany	For WBA, WBC, IBF, WBO, and vacant IBO female welterweight titles
25	Win	21–3 (1)	(Brazil) Silvana Lima de Silva	UD	8	19 Dec 2015	Club Plaza Colonia, Colonia del Sacramento, Uruguay	
24	Win	20–3 (1)	(Argentina) Roxana Beatriz Laborde	UD	6	17 Apr 2015	Club Plaza Colonia, Colonia del Sacramento, Uruguay	
23	Win	19–3 (1)	(Argentina) Roxana Beatriz Laborde	KO	4 (6), 0:53	30 Nov 2013	Club Social y Cultural el Cruce, Malvinas Argentinas, Argentina	
22	Win	18–3 (1)	(Colombia) Lely Luz Flórez	UD	10	15 Dec 2012	Estadio Centenario, Montevideo, Uruguay	
21	Win	17–3 (1)	(Brazil) Adriana Salles	UD	10	23 Jun 2012	Palacio Peñarol, Montevideo, Uruguay	
20	Loss	16–3 (1)	(Argentina) Fernanda Soledad Alegre	UD	10	7 Apr 2012	Club Atlético y Social Villa Calzada, Rafael Calzada, Argentina	For WBO female light welterweight title
19	Loss	16–2 (1)	(Argentina) Fernanda Soledad Alegre	UD	10	17 Dec 2011	Parque Municipal Eva Perón, Lomas de Zamora, Argentina	For vacant WBO female light welterweight title
18	Win	16–1 (1)	(Paraguay) Victorina Britez	TKO	1 (8), 1:33	26 Nov 2011	Club Atletico Irajá, Santana do Livramento, Brazil	
17	Win	15–1 (1)	(Spain) Loli Muñoz	SD	10	11 Jun 2011	Palacio Peñarol, Montevideo, Uruguay	
16	NC	14–1 (1)	(Spain) Loli Muñoz	NC	10	19 Mar 2011	Palacio Peñarol, Montevideo, Uruguay	Originally a MD win for Namús, later ruled a NC after the final round was noticed to be only 1 minute 28 seconds long
15	Win	14–1	(Colombia) Darys Esther Pardo	TKO	4 (8), 1:41	15 Jan 2011	Palacio Peñarol, Montevideo, Uruguay	
14	Win	13–1	(Colombia) Nerys Rincón	TKO	2 (8), 1:19	15 May 2010	Estadio Luna Park, Buenos Aires, Argentina	
13	Win	12–1	(Brazil) Adriana Salles	TKO	7 (10), 1:23	13 Feb 2010	Hotel & Casino Conrad, Punta del Este, Uruguay	
12	Win	11–1	(Brazil) Juliana De Aguiar	KO	1 (6), 1:34	4 Dec 2009	Palacio Peñarol, Montevideo, Uruguay	
11	Win	10–1	(Argentina) Maria Eugenia Quiroga	UD	6	30 Oct 2009	Palacio Peñarol, Montevideo, Uruguay	
10	Loss	9–1	(Colombia) Lely Luz Flórez	TKO	1 (10), 1:44	8 Aug 2009	Palacio Peñarol, Montevideo, Uruguay	For WBC interim female light welterweight title
9	Win	9–0	(United States) Nicole Woods	UD	10	12 Feb 2009	Palacio Peñarol, Montevideo, Uruguay	
8	Win	8–0	(Argentina) Maria Elena Maderna	UD	6	23 Jan 2009	Hotel & Casino Conrad, Punta del Este, Uruguay	
7	Win	7–0	(Brazil) Leticia Rojo	KO	6 (8), 0:48	13 Sep 2008	Palacio Peñarol, Montevideo, Uruguay	
6	Win	6–0	(Mexico) Perla Hernández	TKO	1 (8), 1:50	19 Jul 2008	Palacio Peñarol, Montevideo, Uruguay	
5	Win	5–0	(Argentina) Maria Elena Maderna	UD	6	17 May 2008	Palacio Peñarol, Montevideo, Uruguay	
4	Win	4–0	(Argentina) Guillermina Fernandez	UD	4	4 Feb 2008	Hotel & Casino Conrad, Punta del Este, Uruguay	
3	Win	3–0	(Brazil) Juliana De Aguiar	UD	4	19 Jan 2008	Hotel & Casino Conrad, Punta del Este, Uruguay	
2	Win	2–0	(Argentina) Silvia Fernanda Zacarias	UD	4	11 Aug 2007	Hotel & Casino Conrad, Punta del Este, Uruguay	
1	Win	1–0	(Argentina) Maria Eugenia Lopez	UD	4	18 May 2007	Palacio Peñarol, Montevideo, Uruguay	

Sporting positions
World boxing titles
Vacant Title last held by Paola Gabriela Casalinuovo	IBF female junior middleweight champion 12 August 2017 – 1 December 2018	Succeeded by Marie-Eve Dicaire
