= Vergil Ortiz Jr. =

American boxer (born 1998)

Personal information
- Nickname: The Texas Machine
- Born: March 25, 1998 (age 28) Grand Prairie, Texas, U.S.
- Height: 5 ft 10 in (178 cm)
- Weight: Light welterweight; Welterweight; Light middleweight

Boxing career
- Reach: 70 in (178 cm)
- Stance: Orthodox

Boxing record
- Total fights: 24
- Wins: 24
- Win by KO: 22
Medal record
Men's Amateur boxing
Representing United States
Golden Gloves
Silver medal – second place	2016 Salt Lake City	Light welterweight
Silver Gloves
Gold medal – first place	2012 Missouri	Strawweight
Gold medal – first place	2013 Missouri	Light flyweight
Gold medal – first place	2014 Missouri	Bantamweight
Junior Olympic National Championships
Gold medal – first place	2013 Mobile	Flyweight
Junior National Championships
Silver medal – second place	2014 Reno	Bantamweight

Vergil Ortiz Jr. (born March 25, 1998) is an American professional boxer. He has held the World Boxing Council (WBC) interim super welterweight title since 2024.

As an amateur, he was a seven-time national champion and won the 110 pounds category at the USA's Junior Olympic National Championships in 2013. He was named the 2019 Prospect of the Year by The Ring magazine. Ortiz is known for his exceptional punching power, having scored all but two of his wins by knockout.

== Professional career ==
=== Early career ===
Ortiz was victorious in his first six fights, winning all six by stoppage and only going past the first round in one of the six fights.

==== Ortiz Jr vs. Valenzuela ====
His seventh bout came on September 16, 2017, on the undercard of Canelo Álvarez vs. Gennady Golovkin I against Cesar Valenzuela, which he won by second-round technical knockout.

==== Ortiz Jr vs. Ortiz ====
After improving to 11-0, Ortiz appeared a year later on the undercard of Canelo Álvarez vs. Gennady Golovkin II to face Roberto Ortiz. Vergil Ortiz knocked down his opponent with a right hand early in the second round. Roberto got up, but he was still hurt. Vergil attacked him immediately and knocked him down again with a right hand that sent his opponent to one knee. Roberto Ortiz reached his feet again, but the referee deemed him unfit to continue, calling off the fight.

=== Rise up the ranks ===
==== Ortiz Jr vs. Orozco ====
Ortiz, who now had an unblemished record of 13-0, defeated Antonio Orozco by sixth-round technical knockout to win the vacant WBA Gold welterweight title on August 10, 2019, at The Theatre at Grand Prairie, Texas. He defended the title in his next fight against Brad Solomon on December 13, 2019, in Indio, California, winning by fifth-round knockout.

==== Ortiz Jr vs. Vargas ====
Ortiz was originally scheduled to face Samuel Vargas on March 28, 2020, at The Forum, Inglewood, California on the undercard of Canelo Álvarez vs. Billy Joe Saunders. However, following the postponement of the fight between Álvarez and Saunders due to the COVID-19 pandemic, the fight took place on July 24, 2020, at the same venue as Ortiz's previous fight against Brad Solomon. Ortiz won the fight by seventh-round technical knockout and retained his WBA Gold welterweight title.

==== Ortiz Jr vs. Hooker ====
Ortiz returned to the ring on March 20, 2021, beating Maurice Hooker with another seventh-round technical knockout in Fort Worth, Texas to win the vacant WBO International welterweight title. Hooker was ranked #8 by the WBO, #13 by the WBC and #15 by the IBF at welterweight.

==== Ortiz Jr vs. Kavaliauskas ====
On August 14, 2021, Ortiz defended the title against Egidijus Kavaliauskas. Kavaliauskas was ranked #5 by the WBO and #10 by the WBC at welterweight. Kavaliauskas, who became Ortiz's first opponent to last longer than seven rounds, suffered five knockdowns as Ortiz won by eighth-round technical knockout.

==== Ortiz Jr vs. McKinson ====
On August 6, 2022, Ortiz Jr fought Michael McKinson in an eliminator for the WBA world welterweight title. McKinson was ranked #5 by the WBO and #10 by the WBA at welterweight. Ortiz Jr beat McKinson by technical knockout in the 9th round.

==== Ortiz Jr vs. Dulorme ====
On April 27, 2024 in Fresno, CA, Ortiz Jr was scheduled to face Thomas Dulorme. He won the fight by knockout with liver shot in the first round.

==== Ortiz Jr vs. Tszyu ====
Ortiz Jr was scheduled to face Tim Tszyu on August 3, 2024 at BMO Stadium in Los Angeles. On May 30, 2024 it was announced that the fight was canceled with medical advice. Tszyu required more time to heal from the injury sustained in his previous bout against Sebastian Fundora in March.

=== Interim WBC super welterweight champion ===
==== Ortiz Jr vs. Bohachuk ====
On June 24, 2024 it was announced that Ortiz Jr would face Serhii Bohachuk in Las Vegas on August 10, 2024. Ortiz was knocked down twice in the bout, but went on to win via majority decision (114–112, 114–112, 113–113) after twelve competitive rounds; this being the first time Ortiz had gone the full distance in a fight.

==== Ortiz Jr vs. Madrimov ====
On February 22, 2025 in Riyadh, Saudi Arabia, Ortiz Jr defeated Israil Madrimov by unanimous decision to retain his interim WBC super welterweight title, with two scores reading 115–113 and one reading 117–111. This was the second time in Ortiz's career that he went the distance, as well as the second time in a row.

==== Ortiz Jr vs. Lubin ====
On November 8, 2025, Ortiz Jr defended his interim WBC super welterweight title via 2nd round TKO victory over Erickson Lubin in Fort Worth, TX.

==== Ortiz Jr vs. Ennis Negotiations ====
As one of the biggest fights in boxing, a bout between Vergil Ortiz Jr and Jaron Ennis has been in talks for a while, with Ennis previously rejecting proposals to fight Ortiz Jr on undercard fights in Saudi Arabia, not wanting to move up to Super Welterweight while trying to unify the World Titles at Welterweight. After Ortiz Jr's bout with Lubin, Ortiz Jr and Ennis officially entered negotiations for a proposed bout at the MGM Grand in March 2026, with Ortiz Jr's promotion Golden Boy Promotions, pulling out of negotiations as both Oscar De La Hoya and Ortiz Jr's manager Rick Mirigian could not reach an agreement with Ennis's team and Promotion after wanting a 60/40 split in favor of Ortiz Jr.

== Professional boxing record ==
24 fights	24 wins	0 losses
By knockout	22	0
By decision	2	0

No.	Result	Record	Opponent	Type	Round, time	Date	Location	Notes
24	Win	24–0	Erickson Lubin	TKO	2 (12), 1:30	Nov 8, 2025	Dickies Arena, Fort Worth, Texas, USA	Retained WBC interim super welterweight title
23	Win	23–0	Israil Madrimov	UD	12	Feb 22, 2025	The Venue Riyadh Season, Riyadh, Saudi Arabia	Retained WBC interim super welterweight title
22	Win	22–0	Serhii Bohachuk	MD	12	Aug 10, 2024	Michelob Ultra Arena, Paradise, Nevada, U.S.	Won WBC interim super welterweight title
21	Win	21–0	Thomas Dulorme	KO	1 (12), 2:39	Apr 27, 2024	Save Mart Center, Fresno, California, U.S.	
20	Win	20–0	Fredrick Lawson	TKO	1 (12), 2:33	Jan 6, 2024	Virgin Hotels Las Vegas, Paradise, Nevada, U.S	
19	Win	19–0	Michael McKinson	TKO	9 (12), 0:27	Aug 6, 2022	Dickies Arena, Fort Worth, Texas, U.S.	Retained WBO International welterweight title
18	Win	18–0	Egidijus Kavaliauskas	TKO	8 (12), 2:59	Aug 14, 2021	Ford Center at The Star, Frisco, Texas, U.S.	Retained WBO International welterweight title
17	Win	17–0	Maurice Hooker	TKO	7 (12), 0:36	Mar 20, 2021	Dickies Arena, Fort Worth, Texas, U.S.	Won vacant WBO International welterweight title
16	Win	16–0	Samuel Vargas	TKO	7 (12), 2:58	Jul 24, 2020	Fantasy Springs Resort Casino, Indio, California, U.S.	Retained WBA Gold welterweight title
15	Win	15–0	Brad Solomon	KO	5 (12), 2:22	Dec 13, 2019	Fantasy Springs Resort Casino, Indio, California, U.S.	Retained WBA Gold welterweight title
14	Win	14–0	Antonio Orozco	KO	6 (12), 2:16	Aug 10, 2019	The Theatre at Grand Prairie, Grand Prairie, Texas, U.S.	Won vacant WBA Gold welterweight title
13	Win	13–0	Mauricio Herrera	KO	3 (10), 0:29	May 4, 2019	T-Mobile Arena, Paradise, Nevada, U.S.	
12	Win	12–0	Jesus A Valdez Barrayan	RTD	5 (10), 3:00	Jan 26, 2019	Toyota Center, Houston, Texas, U.S.	
11	Win	11–0	Roberto Ortiz	TKO	2 (10), 1:03	Sep 15, 2018	T-Mobile Arena, Paradise, Nevada, U.S.	
10	Win	10–0	Juan Carlos Salgado	KO	3 (10), 1:52	Jun 23, 2018	Belasco Theater, Los Angeles, California, U.S.	
9	Win	9–0	Jesus Alvarez Rodriguez	TKO	3 (8), 2:23	Feb 22, 2018	Fantasy Springs Resort Casino, Indio, California, U.S.	Won vacant NABF Junior super lightweight title
8	Win	8–0	Evandro Cavalheiro	TKO	1 (8), 0:21	Nov 16, 2017	Polifórum Benito Juárez, Cancún, Mexico	
7	Win	7–0	Cesar Valenzuela	TKO	2 (6), 1:22	Sep 16, 2017	T-Mobile Arena, Paradise, Nevada, U.S.	
6	Win	6–0	Ricardo Alan Fernandez	TKO	1 (6), 2:09	Jun 17, 2017	Tostitos Championship Plaza, Frisco, Texas, U.S.	
5	Win	5–0	Angel Sarinana	TKO	3 (4), 1:44	May 5, 2017	MGM Grand Garden Arena, Paradise, Nevada, U.S.	
4	Win	4–0	Israel Villela	KO	1 (4), 1:26	Jan 28, 2017	Fantasy Springs Resort Casino, Indio, California, U.S.	
3	Win	3–0	Nestor Garcia	KO	1 (4), 3:00	Dec 16, 2016	Fantasy Springs Resort Casino, Indio, California, U.S.	
2	Win	2–0	Ernesto Hernandez	KO	1 (4), 0:40	Sep 17, 2016	AT&T Stadium, Arlington, Texas, U.S.	
1	Win	1–0	Julio Rodas	KO	1 (4), 1:37	Jul 30, 2016	Fantasy Springs Resort Casino, Indio, California, U.S.	

== See also ==
- List of male boxers

Sporting positions
Regional boxing titles
Vacant Title last held by Yves Ulysse Jr.	NABF Junior light-welterweight champion February 22, 2018 – December 2018; Vacated	Vacant Title next held by Arnold Barboza Jr.
New title	WBA Gold welterweight champion August 10, 2019 – March 2021; Vacated	Vacant
Vacant Title last held by Custio Clayton	WBO International welterweight champion March 20, 2021 – November 2023; Vacated	Vacant Title next held by Brian Norman Jr.
World boxing titles
Preceded by Serhii Bohachuk	WBC light-middleweight champion Interim title August 10, 2024 – present	Incumbent
Awards
Previous: Teofimo Lopez	The Ring Prospect of the Year; 2019	Next: Jaron Ennis
