= Mónica Núñez =

Dominican Republic boxer

Personal information
- Nickname: La Flecha
- Nationality: Dominican
- Born: 12 October 1976 (age 49) Santo Domingo, Dominican Republic
- Height: 5 ft 8 in (173 cm)
- Weight: Middleweight; Super-middleweight

Boxing career
- Reach: 69 in (175 cm)
- Stance: Orthodox

Boxing record
- Total fights: 13
- Wins: 9
- Win by KO: 4
- Losses: 4

Mónica Núñez (born 12 October 1976) is a Dominican former professional boxer who competed from 2000 to 2005. She challenged once for the IWBF super-middleweight title in 2004 and once for the WIBA middleweight title in 2005.

== Professional boxing record ==
| 13 fights | 9 wins | 4 losses |
|---|---|---|
| By knockout | 4 | 3 |
| By decision | 5 | 1 |

| No. | Result | Record | Opponent | Type | Round, time | Date | Location | Notes |
|---|---|---|---|---|---|---|---|---|
| 13 | Loss | 9–4 | (United States) Ann Wolfe | RTD | 7 (8), 3:00 | 19 Jul 2005 | (United States) Isle of Capri Hotel & Casino, Lula, Mississippi, US | |
| 12 | Loss | 9–3 | (United States) Leatitia Robinson | KO | 1 (10) | 11 Feb 2005 | (United States) Philips Arena, Atlanta, Georgia, US | For WIBA middleweight title |
| 11 | Loss | 9–2 | (United States) Laila Ali | TKO | 9 (10), 0:42 | 30 Jul 2004 | (United States) Freedom Hall State Fairground, Louisville, Kentucky, US | For IWBF super-middleweight title |
| 10 | Win | 9–1 | (United States) Shelley Burton | MD | 6 | 26 Jun 2004 | (United States) Silverton Hotel, Las Vegas, Nevada, US | |
| 9 | Win | 8–1 | (Bermuda) Teresa Perozzi | UD | 4 | 12 Jun 2004 | Cedarbridge Academy, Devonshire Parish, Bermuda | |
| 8 | Win | 7–1 | (United States) Shadina Pennybaker | TKO | 2 (6) | 4 Dec 2003 | (United States) Days Inn, Allentown, Pennsylvania, US | |
| 7 | Loss | 6–1 | (United States) Roselin Morales | SD | 4 | 23 Oct 2003 | (United States) Days Inn, Allentown, Pennsylvania, US | |
| 6 | Win | 6–0 | (Dominican Republic) Diana Carolina Garcia Dominguez | UD | 4 | 19 Dec 2002 | Coliseo Carlos 'Teo' Cruz, Santo Domingo, Dominican Republic | |
| 5 | Win | 5–0 | (Dominican Republic) Damaris Vizcaino | TKO | 3 (4) | 20 Sep 2002 | Coliseo Carlos 'Teo' Cruz, Santo Domingo, Dominican Republic | |
| 4 | Win | 4–0 | (Dominican Republic) Angela Garcia | TKO | 4 (4) | 29 Aug 2001 | Santo Domingo, Dominican Republic | |
| 3 | Win | 3–0 | (Dominican Republic) Liliana Martinez | PTS | 4 | 29 Nov 2000 | Santo Domingo, Dominican Republic | |
| 2 | Win | 2–0 | (Dominican Republic) Marilyn Hernandez | PTS | 4 | 13 Sep 2000 | Santo Domingo, Dominican Republic | |
| 1 | Win | 1–0 | (Dominican Republic) Claribel Ferreras | TKO | 3 (4) | 29 Jun 2000 | Santo Domingo, Dominican Republic | |
