= Claire Hafner =

Canadian boxer (born 1977)

Personal information
- Nationality: American; Canadian
- Born: April 23, 1977 (age 49) Cortland, New York, U.S.
- Height: 5 ft 4 in (163 cm)
- Weight: Light heavyweight; Heavyweight

Boxing career
- Reach: 64 in (163 cm)
- Stance: Orthodox

Boxing record
- Total fights: 7
- Wins: 4
- Win by KO: 0
- Losses: 3

Claire Hafner (born April 23, 1977) is a Canadian professional boxer and opera singer. She challenged once for the WBO light heavyweight title in October 2019.

== Boxing career ==
She began her career as an amateur boxer in 2013. She won multiple tournaments in her amateur days including the Ringside World Championships, and was the silver medalist in the 2016 Canadian Championships. She made her professional boxing debut in May 2017 against Annie Mazerolle. After a majority decision win over Mazerolle, they had a rematch in August 2017. Mazerolle won the rematch by split decision. Hafner ended her 2017 with a win over Mexican boxer Claudia Ramirez. Hafner did not fight for nine months, but she returned to fight a top ranked American boxer Sonja Fox for the American Boxing Organisation (ABO) American female heavyweight title. Hafner won the tough bout by majority decision. At this time negotiations started for the potential world title fight against Geovana Peres. Hafner took nine months away from the ring but returned in June 2019. This time she took on former World title contender Carlette Ewell for the Universal National Boxing Council (UNBC) American female heavyweight title. Hafner won the bout with ease almost winning every round. After winning this fight she received multiple world ranking spots including second in the WBA, fourth in the WBC, and first on Boxrec.

=== World title shot ===
On the 5 May 2019, Bruce Glozier announced that he was in negotiations for Geovana Peres' first world title defence against Claire Hafner. It was announced on 30 July that the fight was made official and will happen on 4 October at Sky City Convention Centre in Auckland, New Zealand. Hafner arrived in Auckland on the 30 September and met Geovana Peres on 1 October at Cheltenham Beach for a photo shoot. The two met again at the weigh-in on 3 October at Sammy's on the Gaming floor at the SKy City Casino. Before the event fight started, Hafner performed the Canadian national anthem before competing against Geovana Peres. The referee stopped the fight between the eighth and ninth round of the fight.

== Professional titles ==
- American Boxing Organisation (ABO) American female heavyweight title (184 Ibs)
- Universal National Boxing Council (UNBC) American female heavyweight title (190 1/4 Ibs)

== Professional boxing record ==
7 fights	4 wins	3 losses
By knockout	0	1
By decision	4	2

No.	Result	Record	Opponent	Type	Round, time	Date	Location	Notes
7	Loss	4–3	(United States) Leatitia Robinson	UD	6	Feb 8, 2020	(United States) Civic Center, Hammond, Indiana, U.S.	
6	Loss	4–2	(New Zealand) Geovana Peres	TKO	8 (10), 3:00	Oct 4, 2019	Skycity Auckland, Auckland, New Zealand	For WBO light heavyweight title
5	Win	4–1	(United States) Carlette Ewell	UD	8	Jun 15, 2019	(United States) Benton Convention Center, Winston-Salem, North Carolina, U.S.	Won UNBC American female heavyweight title
4	Win	3–1	(United States) Sonja Fox	MD	6	Sep 29, 2018	(United States) 4 Bears Casino & Lodge, New Town, North Dakota, U.S.	Won ABO American female heavyweight title
3	Win	2–1	(Mexico) Claudia Ramirez	UD	4	Oct 25, 2017	Lac Leamy Casino, Gatineau, Quebec, Canada	
2	Loss	1–1	(Canada) Annie Mazerolle	SD	6	Aug 19, 2017	Festival Arena, Shediac, New Brunswick, Canada	
1	Win	1–0	(Canada) Annie Mazerolle	MD	4	May 27, 2017	Aitken Centre, Fredericton, New Brunswick, Canada	
