= Kisha =

Kisha can refer to:

- Kisha clubs, journalists' cartels in Japan
- Kisha Ford, former WNBA player
- Kisha Snow, U.S. boxer
- Kisha (river), in Adygea, Russia
- Kisha (musician), Swiss singer
- Kisha Seizo, a former Japanese rolling stock company
