= Leatitia Robinson =

American boxer

Personal information
- Nickname: Baby Girl
- Born: September 30, 1980 (age 45) Chicago, Illinois, U.S.
- Height: 5 ft 7 in (170 cm)
- Weight: Middleweight; Super middleweight

Boxing career
- Stance: Orthodox

Boxing record
- Total fights: 17
- Wins: 16
- Win by KO: 9
- Losses: 1

Leatitia Robinson (born September 30, 1980) an American professional boxer who held the IWBF middleweight title from 2002 to 2004 and the WIBA middleweight title from 2004 to 2006.

== Amateur career ==
Robinson was born in Chicago, Illinois, in 1980. She began boxing at age 14 to survive in Cabrini–Green public housing projects. She was involved with numerous street fights growing up, and would often beat up large men in these encounters.

Robinson won her first Golden Gloves competition in 1995. She repeated the performance in 1996, 1997 and 1998, also winning the 1996 Citywide Tournament in Chicago.

On May 31, 1998, in the 156-lb final of the USA Boxing/Everlast National Senior Championships in Anaheim, California, Robinson lost to Evelyn Rodriquez of New York by a 10-2 score. This would be Robinson's only defeat as an amateur boxer.

On April 15, 2000, in the 165-lb final of the USA Boxing/Everlast National Championships in Midland, Texas, Robinson stopped her opponent at 0:51 in the opening round.

On May 7, 2000, in the 75-kg final of the prestigious Feenix Box Cup international tournament in Turku, Finland, Robinson defeated Canadian champion Jennyfer Grenon by a 5-4 margin.

On August 12, 2000, in the 165-lb Open Division Final of the 2000 US National/International Golden Gloves in Augusta, Georgia, Robinson won by a 5-0 decision over Angela Josipovic of Toronto, Canada.

Robinson's amateur boxing career ended with a 37-1 record.

== Professional career ==
She made her pro debut on March 23, 2001 in Rosemont, Illinois, winning by a first-round TKO over Aicheria Bell in a scheduled 4 rounder. Bell's pro record fell to 1-4.

On December 14, 2002 in Dorchester, Massachusetts, in a battle of former US amateur champions, Robinson TKO'd Dakota Stone in the sixth round to win the vacant IWBF Middleweight title.

On February 28, 2004 at Veterans Memorial Field House in Huntington, West Virginia, in a battle between two undefeated and top-ranked fighters, Robinson won the WIBA Middleweight title with a ten-round unanimous (98-92 97-94 99-91) decision over Nikki Eplion. Former Toughwoman champion Eplion was the favorite of the crowd, estimated at 1,000, and had predicted a third-round KO at the weigh-in. But the ring skills that Robinson had honed in her 37-1 amateur career were too much for Eplion as Robinson constantly beat her to the punch.

On September 24, 2004 at the Philips Arena in Atlanta, Georgia, Robinson won the IBA Continental Light Heavyweight title with a ten-round unanimous decision over Valerie Mahfood. Robinson outboxed Mahfood while punishing her with fast jabs and right hands. Robinson punctuated this performance by knocking down Mahfood in the 10th round.

On February 11, 2005 at the Philips Arena in Atlanta, Georgia, Robinson knocked out Mónica Núñez with only the second punch she threw in the fight, to earn an easy 36-second win and successfully defend her WIBA Middleweight Title.

== Professional boxing record ==
17 fights	16 wins	1 loss
By knockout	9	0
By decision	7	1

No.	Result	Record	Opponent	Type	Round, time	Date	Location	Notes
17	Win	16–1	Claire Hafner	UD	6	Feb 8, 2020	Civic Center, Hammond, Indiana, U.S.	
16	Loss	15–1	Ijeoma Egbunine	UD	8	Apr 4, 2009	Convention Center, Vicksburg, Mississippi, U.S.	
15	Win	15–0	Yvonne Reis	MD	10	Dec 2, 2006	Moi International Sports Centre, Nairobi, Kenya	Retained WIBA middleweight title
14	Win	14–0	Cassandra Giger	UD	6	Dec 10, 2005	Club O Arena, Harvey, Illinois, U.S.	
13	Win	13–0	Mónica Núñez	KO	1 (10), 0:30	Feb 11, 2005	Philips Arena, Atlanta, Georgia, U.S.	Retained WIBA middleweight title
12	Win	12–0	Valerie Mahfood	UD	10	Sep 24, 2004	Philips Arena, Atlanta, Georgia, U.S.	
11	Win	11–0	Nikki Eplion	UD	10	Feb 28, 2004	Memorial Field House, Huntington, West Virginia. U.S.	Won WIBA middleweight title
10	Win	10–0	Yvonne Reis	UD	10	Jan 30, 2004	National Guard Armory, Worcester, Massachusetts, U.S.	Retained IWBF middleweight title
9	Win	9–0	Dakota Stone	KO	6 (10)	Dec 14, 2002	Dorchester Armory, Dorchester, Boston, Massachusetts, U.S.	Won vacant IWBF middleweight title
8	Win	8–0	Evelyn Holley	TKO	2 (4)	Sep 13, 2002	National Guard Armory, Braintree, Massachusetts, U.S.	
7	Win	7–0	Norma Galloway	TKO	3 (6)	Jun 28, 2002	Roseland Ballroom, Taunton, Massachusetts, U.S.	
6	Win	6–0	Genevia Buckhalter	KO	1 (4), 1:48	Nov 21, 2001	Ramada Inn, Rosemont, Illinois, U.S.	
5	Win	5–0	Jeanine Tracy	TKO	3 (4)	Oct 17, 2001	Ramada Inn, Rosemont, Illinois, U.S.	
4	Win	4–0	Karen Bill	UD	4	Jun 14, 2001	Ramada Inn, Rosemont, Illinois, U.S.	
3	Win	3–0	Marquita Robertson	TKO	1 (4), 0:31	May 17, 2001	Hollywood Casino, Aurora, Illinois, U.S.	
2	Win	2–0	Theresa Oprysk	TKO	1 (4), 0:53	May 10, 2001	Casino Queen, East St. Louis, Illinois, U.S.	
1	Win	1–0	Alcheria Bell	TKO	1 (4), 1:58	Mar 23, 2001	Allstate Arena, Rosemont, Illinois, U.S.	
