= Åsa Sandell =

Swedish journalist and boxer

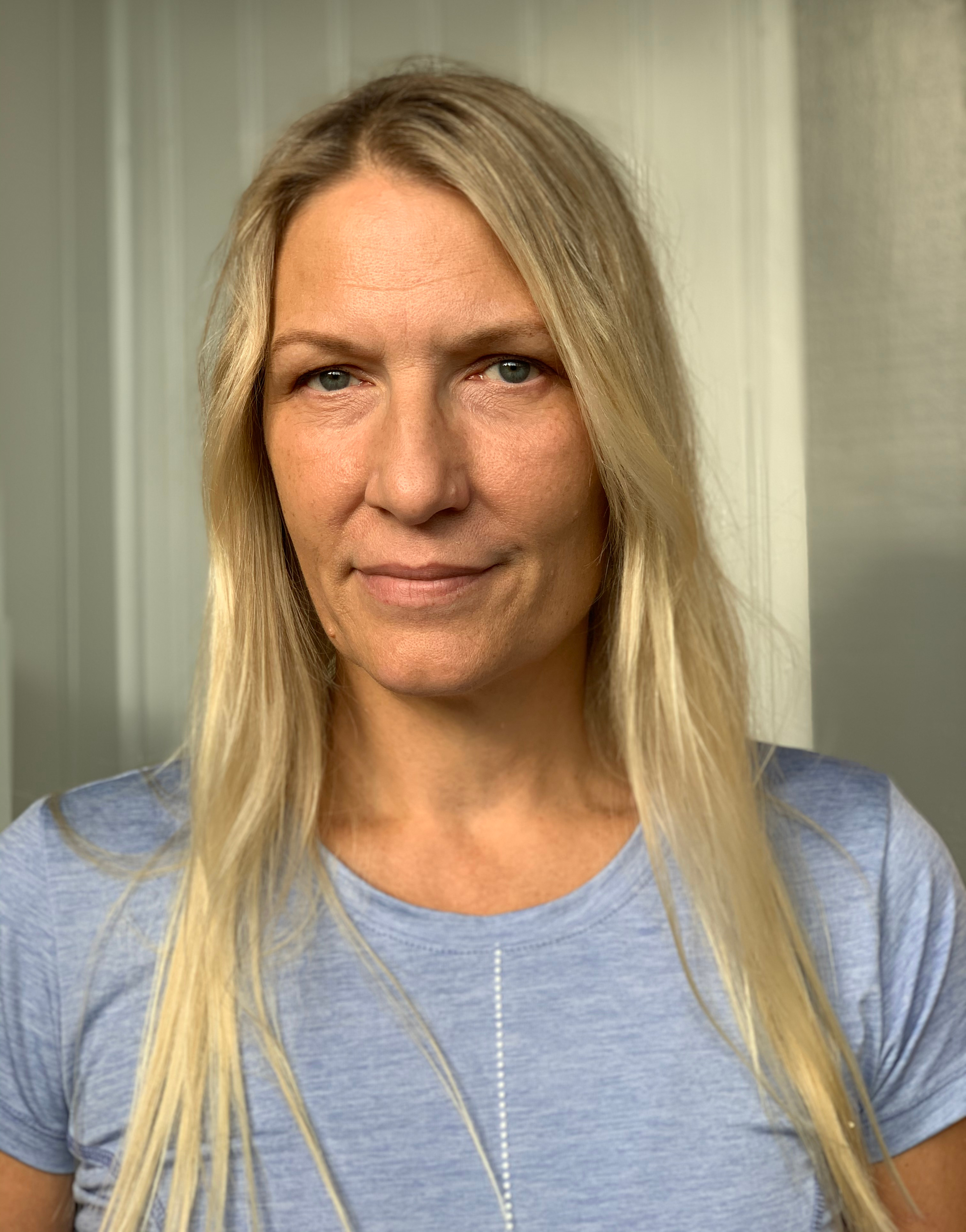
- Sandell in 2020

Personal information
- Born: Åsa Maria Sandell; 24 January 1967 (age 59) Örebro, Sweden
- Weight: Super Middleweight

Boxing career
- Stance: Orthodox

Åsa Maria Sandell (born January 24, 1967) is a Swedish journalist and professional female super middleweight boxer.

== Early life ==
Sandell was born in Hovsta in Örebro County, and has a university degree in journalism and literature.

== Career ==
She was European champion in 2000 and has been Swedish champion a few times. She faced Laila Ali on December 17, 2005, in the Max-Schmeling-Halle, Berlin, and lost by TKO after five rounds.

== Personal life ==
As of 2004, she lives in Malmö and works as editor at the Culture section at the newspaper Helsingborgs Dagblad, based in nearby Helsingborg.

== Professional boxing record ==
11 fights	6 wins	3 losses
By knockout	3	2
By decision	3	1
Draws	2	

No.	Result	Record	Opponent	Type	Round, time	Date	Location	Notes
11	Draw	6–3–2	(Bermuda) Teresa Perozzi	PTS	6	2007-09-15	Löfbergs Arena, Karlstad, Sweden	Retained World Boxing Empire Middleweight title. For vacant WBC International Middleweight title.
10	Win	6–3–1	(United States) Dakota Stone	MD	6	2007-03-31	Lisebergshallen, Gothenburg, Sweden	Won World Boxing Empire Middleweight title.
9	Win	5–3–1	(United States) Tiffany Carter	RTD	4 (4)	2007-01-27	Scandinavium, Gothenburg, Sweden	
8	Win	4–3–1	(United States) Cimberly Harris	UD	6	2006-10-19	(United States) Plattduetsche Restaurant, Franklin Square, New York, USA	
7	Loss	3–3–1	(Nigeria) Ijeoma Egbunine	TKO	2 (8), 1:58	2006-06-17	(United States) LJVM Coliseum, Winston-Salem, North Carolina, USA	
6	Loss	3–2–1	(United States) Laila Ali	TKO	5 (10), 1:51	2005-12-17	Max-Schmeling-Halle, Berlin, Germany	
5	Loss	3–1–1	(United States) Laura Ramsey	SD	6	2005-10-08	(United States) Harrah's Laughlin, Laughlin, Nevada, USA	
4	Win	3–0–1	(Canada) Donna Logue	TKO	2 (4), 2:00	2005-06-18	Shaw Conference Centre, Edmonton, Alberta, Canada	
3	Draw	2–0–1	(United States) Yolanda Swindell	PTS	6	2005-03-26	(United States) Harrah's Laughlin, Laughlin, Nevada, USA	
2	Win	2–0	(United States) Bose Ijoala	UD	4	2005-01-29	(United States) Silverton Hotel and Casino, Las Vegas, Nevada, USA	
1	Win	1–0	(United States) Tabitha Rosario	TKO	3 (4)	2004-05-30	(United States) DC Tunnel, Washington, D.C., USA	Professional debut.
