= Ijeoma Egbunine =

Nigerian boxer

Personal information
- Nickname: The Praise
- Nationality: Nigerian
- Born: 30 December 1980 (age 45) Benin City, Nigeria
- Height: 5 ft 9 in (175 cm)
- Weight: Light-heavyweight

Boxing career
- Stance: Orthodox

Boxing record
- Total fights: 19
- Wins: 17
- Win by KO: 10
- Losses: 2

Ijeoma Egbunine (born 30 December 1980) is a Nigerian former professional boxer who competed from 2004 to 2011. She held the WIBF light-heavyweight title in 2006.

== Professional career ==
Ijeoma Egbunine's first professional match was a win by unanimous decision against Janaya Davis in December 2004. That decision was highly contested by Davis, however, who claimed she was set up to lose by the promoter. Egubine did not take these comments lightly, and promised to be more aggressive during their next fight. In her second match against the Atlanta favorite on 25 February 2005, Egbunine KO'ed Davis in the second round. According to, "In the second round the intensity did not let up as the bad blood began to boil between the two. At the 30 second mark of the 2nd round Egbunine landed a crushing overhand right that sent Davis brutally to the canvas. Davis struggled to get to her feet as she fell for a second time trying. As she stumbled to her feet referee Jim Korb stopped the fight -- Jose Santiago"

Her only loss came on 12 March 2005, to Nikki Eplion (in her first fight since losing to Laila Ali) in a close decision. The bout, only the third for Egbunine, was the main event on the seven-fight "A Punch Of Class" in front of 600 fans in the ballroom at the Radisson Hotel, Huntington, West Virginia.

Since then, Egbunine went on a string of victories (including 7 more KOs) against a number of talented boxers, including Carlette Ewell and Valerie Mahfood.

On Saturday, 17 June 2006, she took on the well known Åsa Sandell of Sweden at the Joel Coliseum Annex, Winston-Salem, North Carolina. Sandell had fought Laila Ali in December 2005 and lost in the 5th round. Egbunine won with a TKO in the second round, taking her one step closer to an inevitable first-time match-up with the popular Ali.
