= Sonya Lamonakis =

American boxer (born 1974)

Personal information
- Nickname: The Scholar
- Nationality: (Greece) Greek (United States) American
- Born: Sonya Lamonakis; October 7, 1974 (age 52) Greece
- Height: 5 ft 7 in (1.70 m)
- Weight: Heavyweight

Boxing career
- Reach: 71.0 in (180 cm)

Boxing record
- Total fights: 14
- Wins: 10
- Win by KO: 1
- Losses: 2
- Draws: 3

Sonya Lamonakis (born October 7, 1974, Greece) is a Greek American boxer and New York City school teacher. Lamonakis is ranked formally no.1 in the women's heavyweight division in the World Boxing Council. Lamonakis is a former IBO World Heavyweight Champion. Lamonakis was inducted into the International Women's Boxing Hall of Fame in 2023.

== Professional Boxing Titles ==
- USA New York State female heavyweight title (229 Ibs)
- IBO World female heavyweight title

== Professional boxing record ==
15 fights	10 wins	2 losses
By knockout	1	0
By decision	9	2
Draws	3	

No.	Result	Record	Opponent	Type	Round, time	Date	Location	Notes
15	Draw	10–2–3	(United States) Laura Ramsey	PTS	10	10 Jun 2017	DCU Center, Worcester, Massachusetts, United States	For vacant UBF World female heavyweight title
14	Lose	10–2–2	(Guyana) Gwendolyn O'Neil	SD	10	4 Jul 2015	L.B. Scott Sports Auditorium, Philipsburg, Sint Maarten	For vacant UBF World female heavyweight title
13	Win	10–1–2	(United States) Carlette Ewell	SD	10	6 Dec 2014	L.B. Scott Sports Auditorium, Philipsburg, Sint Maarten	vacant IBO World female heavyweight title
12	Win	9–1–2	(United States) Tiffany Woodard	UD	8	22 Mar 2014	(United States) Five Star Banquet, Long Island City, Queens, New York, USA	vacant USA New York State female heavyweight title
11	Win	8–1–2	(Trinidad and Tobago) Tanzee Daniel	UD	6	14 Aug 2013	(United States) BB King Blues Club & Grill, New York, New York, USA	
10	Lose	7–1–2	(United States) Martha Salazar	UD	6	13 Apr 2013	(United States) Lions Gate Convention Center, Sacramento, California, USA	
9	Win	7–0–2	(Trinidad and Tobago) Tanzee Daniel	MD	6	29 Sep 2012	(United States) MGM Grand at Foxwoods Resort, Mashantucket, Connecticut, USA	
8	Draw	6–0–2	(United States) Tiffany Woodard	SD	6	14 Jun 2012	(United States) Roseland Ballroom, New York, New York, USA	
7	Draw	6–0–1	(United States) Carlette Ewell	SD	6	21 Jan 2012	(United States) Roseland Ballroom, New York, New York, USA	
6	Win	6–0	(United States) Tiffany Woodard	MD	6	20 Aug 2011	(United States) Mechanics Hall, Worcester, Massachusetts, USA	
5	Win	5–0	(United States) GiGi Jackson	UD	4	16 Apr 2011	(United States) Foxwoods Resort, Mashantucket, Connecticut, USA	
4	Win	4–0	(Trinidad and Tobago) Tanzee Daniel	UD	6	12 Mar 2011	(United States) MGM Grand at Foxwoods Resort, Mashantucket, Connecticut, USA	
3	Win	3–0	(United States) Tiffany Woodard	UD	6	1 Dec 2010	(United States) BB King Blues Club & Grill, New York, New York, USA	
2	Win	2–0	(United States) Alysia Williams-Stevenson	UD	4	6 Oct 2010	(United States) BB King Blues Club & Grill, New York, New York, USA	
1	Win	1–0	(United States) Kasondra Hardnett	TKO	2 (4); 0:42	24 Jun 2010	(United States) Mechanics Hall, Worcester, Massachusetts, USA	Professional debut
