= Tori Nelson =

American boxer (born 1976)

Personal information
- Born: Tori Jovan Nelson; August 26, 1976 (age 50) South Hill, Virginia, U.S.
- Height: 5 ft 6 in (168 cm)
- Weight: Welterweight; Light middleweight; Middleweight; Super middleweight

Boxing career
- Reach: 64 in (163 cm)
- Stance: Orthodox

Boxing record
- Total fights: 25
- Wins: 20
- Win by KO: 4
- Losses: 2
- Draws: 3

Tori Jovan Nelson (born August 26, 1976) is an American professional boxer. She is a former three-weight world champion, having held the WBC female middleweight title in 2011: the WIBA middleweight title in 2012; the WIBA welterweight from 2013 to 2014; and the WIBA super middleweight title in 2016. was inducted into the International Women's Boxing Hall of Fame in 2022.

== Amateur career ==
Nelson is a three time Washington, D.C. Golden Gloves champion.

== Professional career ==
Nelson was the World Boxing Council middleweight champion as well as the Women's International Boxing Association welterweight and super middleweight champion.

Nelson won a bout over Mia St. John.

Nelson lost a title bout by going the distance against 2-time Olympic gold medalist Claressa Shields.

== Personal life ==
Nelson is a grandmother and works as a waitress at IHOP. Nelson works at TITLE Boxing Club Ashburn where she uses her experience and enthusiasm to help members achieve their fitness and boxing goals.

== Professional boxing record ==
25 fights	20 wins	2 losses
By knockout	4	0
By decision	16	2
Draws	3	

No.	Result	Record	Opponent	Type	Round, time	Date	Location	Notes
25	Win	20–2–3	(United States) Latasha Burton	TKO	1 (8), 1:00	14 Sep 2019	(United States) Dulles Sportsplex, Sterling, Virginia, U.S.	
24	Win	19–2–3	(Finland) Sanna Turunen	UD	10	1 Dec 2018	(United States) Entertainment and Sports Arena, Washington, D.C., U.S.	Won vacant UBF World middleweight title
23	Win	18–2–3	(United States) Tiffany Woodard	TKO	6 (10), 1:20	4 Aug 2018	(United States) Dulles Sportsplex, Sterling, Virginia, U.S.	
22	Loss	17–2–3	(Germany) Christina Hammer	UD	10	22 Jun 2018	(United States) Masonic Temple, Detroit, Michigan, U.S.	For WBC and WBO female middleweight titles
21	Loss	17–1–3	(United States) Claressa Shields	UD	10	12 Jan 2018	(United States) Turning Stone Resort & Casino, Verona, New York, U.S.	For IBF and WBC female super-middleweight titles
20	Win	17–0–3	(United States) Latasha Burton	RTD	2 (10), 2:00	4 Nov 2017	(United States) Silver Eagle Gun Arena, Ashburn, Virginia, U.S.	
19	Win	16–0–3	(United States) Alicia Napoleon Espinosa	UD	10	10 Dec 2016	(United States) ABC Sports Complex, Springfield, Virginia, U.S.	Won vacant UBF and WIBA World super-middleweight titles
18	Win	15–0–3	(United States) Kita Watkins	UD	10	20 Jun 2015	(United States) Martin's West, Woodlawn, Maryland, U.S.	Won vacant UBF World middleweight title
17	Win	14–0–3	(United States) Kita Watkins	UD	10	20 Mar 2015	(United States) Martin's West, Woodlawn, Maryland, U.S.	Won vacant UBF World super-welterweight title
16	Win	13–0–3	(United States) Victoria Cisneros	UD	10	15 Nov 2014	(United States) Patriot Center, Fairfax, Virginia, U.S.	Won vacant UBF and WIBA World welterweight titles
15	Win	12–0–3	(United States) Lucretia Meacham	UD	4	6 Nov 2014	(United States) Martin's Valley Mansion, Cockeysville, Maryland, U.S.	
14	Win	11–0–3	(Australia) Arlene Blencowe	SD	10	27 Sep 2014	(United States) ABC Sports Complex, Springfield, Virginia, U.S.	Retained WIBA World welterweight title
13	Win	10–0–3	(United States) Nicole Woods	UD	10	28 Jun 2014	(United States) Du Burns Arena, Baltimore, Maryland, U.S.	Retained WIBA World welterweight title
12	Win	9–0–3	(United States) Mia St. John	TKO	2 (10), 0:42	17 May 2014	(United States) Northern Virginia Community College, Annandale, Virginia, U.S.	Retained WIBA World welterweight title
11	Win	8–0–3	(United States) Kali Reis	UD	10	7 Nov 2013	(United States) Martin's Valley Mansion, Cockeysville, Maryland, U.S.	Retained WIBA World welterweight title
10	Win	7–0–3	(Poland) Aleksandra Magdziak Lopes	UD	10	13 Sep 2013	(United States) Twin River Event Center, Lincoln, Rhode Island, U.S.	Won vacant WIBA World welterweight title
9	Draw	6–0–3	(Bermuda) Teresa Perozzi	SD	10	2 Feb 2013	Berkeley Institute Gym, Pembroke, Bermuda	For vacant WBC female middleweight title
8	Draw	6–0–2	(Bermuda) Teresa Perozzi	MD	10	13 Oct 2012	Fairmont Southampton, Southampton, Bermuda	For vacant WBC female middleweight title
7	Win	6–0–1	(United States) Vashon Living	UD	10	11 Feb 2012	(United States) Patriot Center, Fairfax, Virginia, U.S.	Won vacant WIBA World middleweight title
6	Win	5–0–1	(United States) Michelle Garland	UD	4	10 Sep 2011	(United States) Patriot Center, Fairfax, Virginia, U.S.	
5	Win	4–0–1	(United States) Lorissa Rivas	SD	10	29 Jul 2011	Jean Pierre Sports Complex, Port of Spain, Trinidad and Tobago	Won vacant WBC female middleweight title
4	Win	3–0–1	(United States) Rachel Clark	UD	4	25 Jun 2011	(United States) Field House, Virginia Beach, Virginia, U.S.	
3	Win	2–0–1	(United States) Shelly Seivert	UD	6	11 Dec 2010	(United States) National Guard Armory, Pikesville, Maryland, U.S.	
2	Win	1–0–1	(United States) Rachel Clark	UD	4	6 Nov 2010	(United States) Jaycees Community Center, Waldorf, Maryland, U.S.	
1	Draw	0–0–1	(United States) Shelly Seivert	MD	4	8 May 2010	(United States) Du Burns Arena, Baltimore, Maryland, U.S.	Professional debut
