= Vonda Ward =

American boxer and basketball player (born 1973)

- Born: March 16, 1973 (age 53); Macedonia, Ohio, U.S.
- Height: 6 ft 6 in (198 cm)
- Boxing career
- Nickname: All-American Girl
- Born: Vonda Ward
- Weight: Heavyweight
- Stance: Orthodox

Boxing record
- Total fights: 24
- Wins: 23
- Win by KO: 17
- Losses: 1
- Basketball career

Career information
- High school: Trinity High School (Garfield Heights)
- College: Tennessee (1991–1995)
- Position: Center

Career history
- 1996–1997: Colorado Xplosion
- Stats at Basketball Reference
Medals
Women's basketball
Representing United States
Jones Cup
Bronze medal – third place	1993 Jones Cup Taipei, Taiwan	Team

Vonda Ward (born March 16, 1973) is an American former professional boxer and NCAA basketball player. As a boxer, she competed from 2000 to 2008 and held multiple heavyweight world championships, including the WBC title in 2007. She also challenged Ann Wolfe for the WIBA and IBA female light heavyweight titles in 2004, in which she suffered her only defeat, losing by knockout in the first round.

== Early life and basketball career ==
Ward grew up in a sports-oriented family; her father, Larry Ward, is a famous harness racer.

Ward played basketball at Trinity High School in Garfield Heights and was twice named Ohio's "Ms. Basketball." She made "Parade All American" teams twice. She was recruited by Division I universities across the United States.

In 1991, Ward accepted a basketball scholarship at the University of Tennessee. While a member of Pat Summitt's Lady Vols, Ward played in one NCAA basketball championship game (1995) during her college career at Tennessee, losing to the University of Connecticut. She competed with USA Basketball as a member of the 1993 Jones Cup Team that won the Bronze in Taipei. After her college career ended in 1995, Ward played for a professional basketball club in Germany. She later played for the American Basketball League's Colorado Xplosion. In 2012, she was inducted into the Ohio Basketball Hall of Fame.

== Boxing career ==
After a broken leg cut her professional basketball career short, Ward turned her attention to boxing.

Ward's boxing debut occurred on January 15, 2000, when she knocked out Faye Steffen in round one at LaPorte, Indiana. Her first four fights all ended in first-round knockout wins for Ward. On April 27, 2000, she met Genevia Buckwalter in New York. Buckwalter became the first fighter to make it out of the first round against Ward, but Ward still won on a second-round knockout. Ward's next five rivals did not make it past the second round, with two first-round knockouts and three second round wins. At this point of her career, she had a streak of twelve knockout wins in a row.

On February 2, 2001, she met prospect Kisha Snow as part of the state fair celebrations in Columbus, Ohio. Snow came into the fight undefeated after six bouts, and she and Ward engaged in a four-round war, but Ward made Snow her thirteenth straight knockout victim one minute into the fourth and final round. Ward then faced Carley Pesente, on June 16, at Kansas City, Missouri. Pesente lasted two rounds.

After one more win, Ward challenged for the IBA's world's heavyweight title on August 16, 2002. Ward became the champion, but saw her knockout win streak gone as Monica McGowan lasted ten rounds at Canton, Ohio.

Ward defended her title successfully with an eighth-round knockout of Kathy Rivers on December 6 at the Gund Arena in Cleveland. On March 1, 2003, she and Martha Salazar made their Las Vegas debut, with Ward taking a four-round split decision win in a non-title bout.

After one more win, Ward unified her IBA world Heavyweight title with the WIBA's by defeating Salazar in a rematch, held on July 11 in Canton. Ward won by decision.

On May 8, 2004, Ward fought a nationally televised championship bout with Ann Wolfe in Biloxi, Mississippi. At one minute and one seconds of the first round, Wolfe knocked out Ward with a devastating right to the chin, with Ward inadvertently stepping forward into the punch. Ward was unresponsive on the mat for several minutes. Ward sustained a neck injury due to her impact on the canvas and she was hospitalized. Her first-round knockout defeat cost Ward her title and undefeated status.

On December 12, 2004, Ward returned to the boxing ring, knocking out Marsha Valley in four rounds in Cleveland. On 10 February 2007, Ward won the inaugural WBC female heavyweight title, defeating Martha Salazar for the third and final time by unanimous decision.

Ward announced her retirement on 2010. She was inducted into the International Women's Boxing Hall of Fame in 2018.

== Professional boxing record ==
24 fights	23 wins	1 loss
By knockout	17	1
By decision	6	0

No.	Result	Record	Opponent	Type	Round, time	Date	Location	Notes
24	Win	23–1	(United States) Carlette Ewell	UD	10	Feb 23, 2008	(United States) Chapparells Community Center, Akron, Ohio, U.S.	
23	Win	22–1	(United States) Martha Salazar	UD	10	Feb 10, 2007	(United States) Wolstein Center, Cleveland, Ohio, U.S.	Retained WIBA and IBA female heavyweight titles; Won vacant WBC female heavyweight title
22	Win	21–1	(United States) Cassandra Giger	UD	10	Jul 15, 2005	(United States) Gund Arena, Cleveland, Ohio, U.S.	Won vacant IBA female cruiserweight title
21	Win	20–1	(United States) Elizabeth Kerin	KO	2 (10), 1:33	Apr 29, 2005	(United States) Wolstein Center, Cleveland, Ohio, U.S.	Retained WIBA and IBA female heavyweight titles
20	Win	19–1	(United States) Marsha Valley	TKO	4 (10), 1:47	Dec 10, 2004	(United States) Gund Arena, Cleveland, Ohio, U.S.	
19	Loss	18–1	(United States) Ann Wolfe	KO	1 (10), 1:08	May 8, 2004	(United States) Mississippi Coast Coliseum, Biloxi, Mississippi, U.S.	For vacant WIBA and IBA female light heavyweight titles
18	Win	18–0	(United States) Martha Salazar	UD	10	Jul 11, 2003	(United States) Civic Center, Canton, Ohio, U.S.	Retained WIBA and IBA female heavyweight titles
17	Win	17–0	(United States) Jeanine Tracy	TKO	8 (10), 1:40	Mar 14, 2003	(United States) Avalon Events Center, Cleveland, Ohio, U.S.	
16	Win	16–0	(United States) Martha Salazar	SD	4	Mar 1, 2003	(United States) Thomas & Mack Center, Paradise, Nevada, U.S.	
15	Win	15–0	(United States) Kathy Rivers	TKO	8 (10), 1:40	Dec 6, 2002	(United States) Gund Arena, Cleveland, Ohio, U.S.	Retained WIBA and IBA female heavyweight titles
14	Win	14–0	(United States) Monica McGowan	UD	10	Jul 16, 2002	(United States) Civic Center, Canton, Ohio, U.S.	Won vacant WIBA and IBA female heavyweight titles
13	Win	13–0	(United States) GiGi Jackson	TKO	4 (4), 1:48	Feb 22, 2002	(United States) Schottenstein Center, Columbus, Ohio, U.S.	
12	Win	12–0	(United States) Carley Pesente	TKO	2 (4), 1:28	May 16, 2001	(United States) Ameristar Casino, Kansas City, Missouri, U.S.	
11	Win	11–0	(United States) Kisha Snow	TKO	4 (4), 1:05	Feb 2, 2001	(United States) Celeste Center, Columbus, Ohio, U.S.	
10	Win	10–0	(United States) Katie Courtney	TKO	1 (4)	Dec 28, 2000	(United States) Willoughby, Ohio, U.S.	
9	Win	9–0	(United States) Marjorie Jones	KO	1 (4), 1:02	Oct 19, 2000	(United States) The Cosmopolitan, Wickliffe, Ohio, U.S.	
8	Win	8–0	(United States) Sharon Thomas	TKO	1 (4), 1:24	Sep 23, 2000	(United States) Packard Music Hall, Warren, Ohio, U.S.	
7	Win	7–0	(United States) Jeanine Tracy	TKO	2 (4)	Aug 24, 2000	(United States) Columbus, Ohio, U.S.	
6	Win	6–0	(United States) Lisa Redding	TKO	1 (4), 0:31	Jul 17, 2000	(United States) Station Casino, Saint Charles, Missouri, U.S.	
5	Win	5–0	(United States) Genevia Buckhalter	TKO	2 (4), 1:22	Apr 27, 2000	(United States) Hammerstein Ballroom, New York City, New York, U.S.	
4	Win	4–0	(United States) Lana Jock	KO	1 (4), 0:52	Mar 24, 2000	(United States) UAW Hall, Parma, Ohio, U.S.	
3	Win	3–0	(United States) Nicolyn Armstrong	KO	1 (4), 0:59	Mar 11, 2000	(United States) National Guard Armory, Findlay, Ohio, U.S.	
2	Win	2–0	(United States) Mattie Brumley	TKO	1 (4), 1:20	Feb 29, 2000	(United States) Pepsi Coliseum, Indianapolis, Indiana, U.S.	
1	Win	1–0	(United States) Faye Steffen	KO	1 (4), 1:45	Jan 15, 2000	(United States) Civic Center, La Porte, Indiana, U.S.	

Sporting positions
World boxing titles
New title	WBC female heavyweight champion February 2, 2007 – 2010; Retired	Vacant Title next held by Martha Salazar
Preceded by Flor Maria Delgado (Vacated)	WIBA Heavyweight Champion; 2007-02-10 – present	Succeeded by Current
