= Laila Ali =

American boxer (born 1977)

Laila Ali Conway
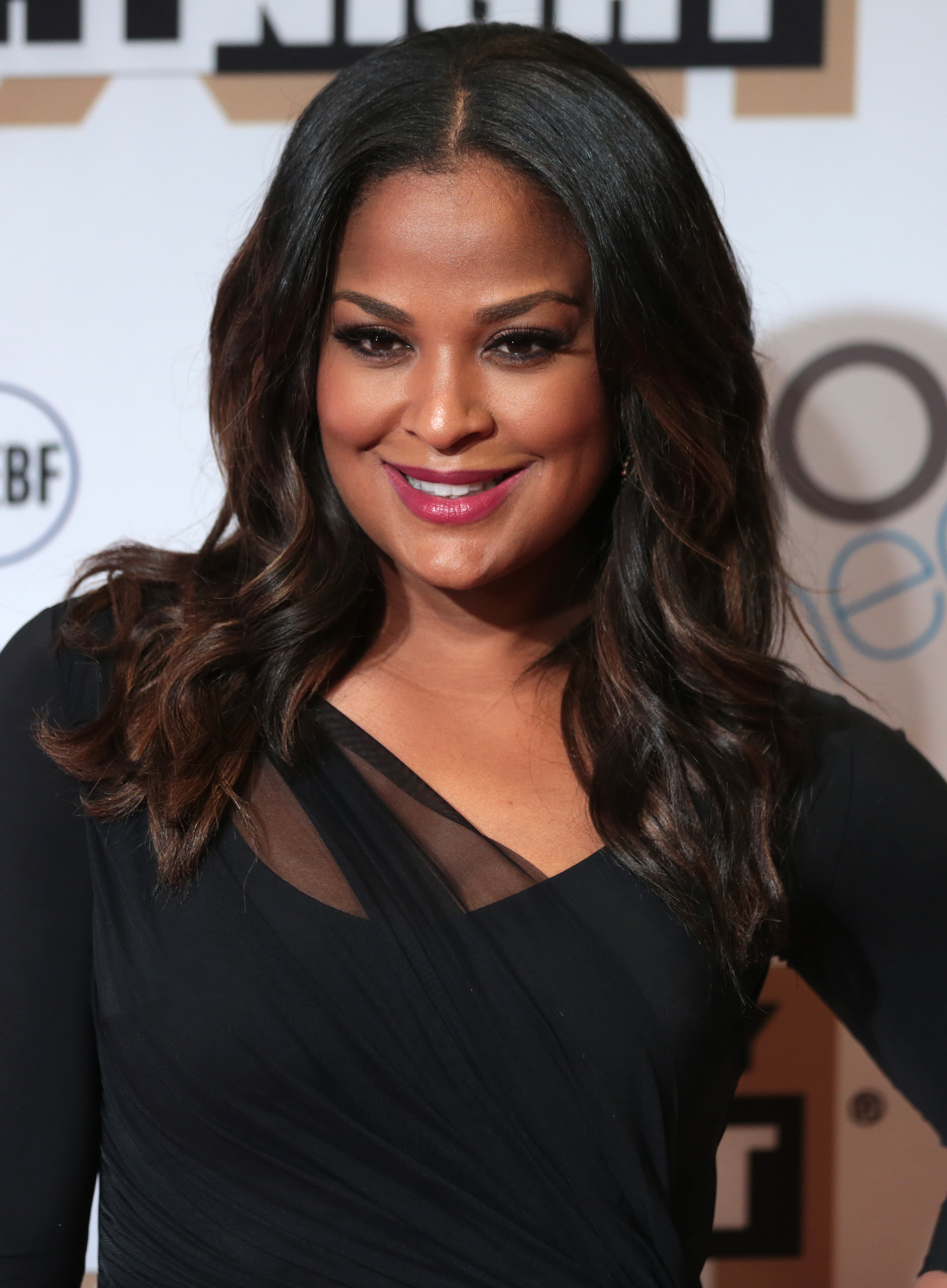
- Ali in 2017
- Born: Laila Amaria Ali; December 30, 1977 (age 48); Miami Beach, Florida, U.S.
- Education: Santa Monica College
- Spouses: Yahya McClain (m. 2000; div. 2005) Curtis Conway (m. 2007)
- Children: 2
- Parents: Muhammad Ali (father); Verónica Porche Ali (mother)
- Relatives: Rahaman Ali (uncle); Nico Ali Walsh (nephew)
- Boxing career
- Nicknames: She Bee Stingin'; Madame Butterfly; Pretty Baby
- Height: 5 ft 9 3/4 in (177.2 cm)
- Weight: Super middleweight Light heavyweight
- Reach: 70 1/2 in (179 cm)
- Stance: Orthodox

Boxing record
- Total fights: 24
- Wins: 24
- Win by KO: 21
- Losses: 0

Laila Amaria Ali Conway (née Ali; born December 30, 1977) is an American television personality and retired professional boxer who competed from 1999 to 2007. During her career, from which she retired undefeated, she held the WBC, WIBA, IWBF and IBA female super middleweight titles, and the IWBF light heavyweight title. Ali is widely regarded by many within the sport as one of the greatest female professional boxers of all time. She is the daughter of boxer Muhammad Ali.

== Early life ==
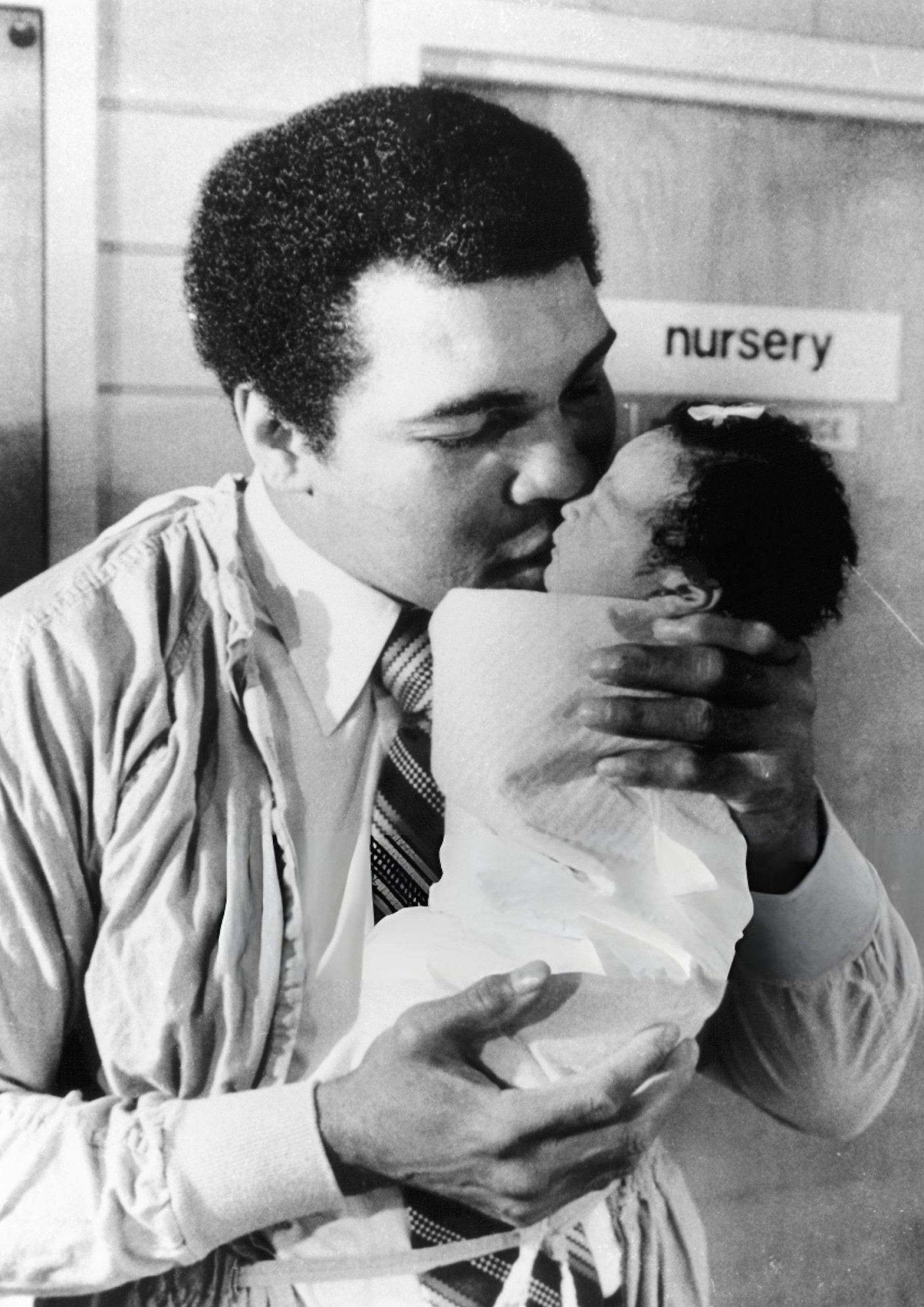
Muhammad Ali holding Laila at her birth in 1977

Laila Amaria Ali was born December 30, 1977, in Miami Beach, Florida, the daughter of boxer Muhammad Ali and his third wife, Veronica Porché. Her parents divorced when she was nine years old. She was raised as a Muslim, but later left Islam despite her father's initial disapproval. Ali was a manicurist at age 16. Her turbulent childhood of arrests and abuse led to her to living in a group home for girls. She graduated from California's Santa Monica College with a business degree. She owned her own nail salon before she began boxing. According to Ali, her father opposed her decision to become a boxer due to his Muslim faith; in an interview she said, "My father first of all, did not believe that women should be boxing. My father was Muslim, I'm not. He was a little bit of a male chauvinist in a way."

== Boxing career ==
Ali began boxing when she was 18 years old, after having first noticed women's boxing when watching a Christy Martin fight. She first publicized her decision to become a professional boxer in a Good Morning America interview with Diane Sawyer. When she first told her father, Muhammad Ali that she was planning to box professionally, he was unhappy about her entering such a dangerous profession. In her first match, on October 8, 1999, the 5-foot-10-inch (1.78 m), 166-pound (75 kg), 21-year-old Ali boxed April Fowler of Michigan City, Indiana. They fought at the Turning Stone Resort & Casino on the Oneida Indian Nation in Verona, New York. Although this was Ali's first match, many journalists and fans attended, largely because she was Muhammad Ali's daughter.

Attention to Ali's ring debut was further boosted because it occurred on the eve of what was supposed to be the first male-female professional bout ever to be sanctioned by a US state boxing commission – later ruled an exhibition. As WomenBoxing.com explains: "The near-alignment of the two events focused more attention on female professional boxing than there had been since Christy Martin's 1996 pay-per-view fight with Deirdre Gogarty." Ali knocked out Fowler – described by WomenBoxing.com as an "out-of-shape novice" – in the first round. Ali also won her second match by a TKO with only 3 seconds left on the clock. In that match her opponent was 5'4" Shadina Pennybaker, from Pittsburgh, who was making a pro debut after earning a 2–1 record as an amateur. They fought at the Mountaineer Casino, Racetrack and Resort in Chester, West Virginia.

Ali captured nine wins in a row and many boxing fans expressed a desire to see her square off in a boxing ring with George Foreman's daughter, Freeda Foreman, or Joe Frazier's daughter, Jacqui Frazier-Lyde. On the evening of June 8, 2001, Ali and Frazier finally met. The fight was nicknamed Ali/Frazier IV in allusion to their fathers' famous fight trilogy. Ali won by a majority judges' decision in eight rounds (79–73, 77–75, 76–76). Frazier-Lyde ended the fight with a swollen eye while Ali had a fractured left collarbone and a bloodied nose. This match by Ali and Frazier was the first main-event pay-per-view match between two women. After a year's hiatus, on June 7, 2002, Ali beat Shirvelle Williams in a six-round decision.

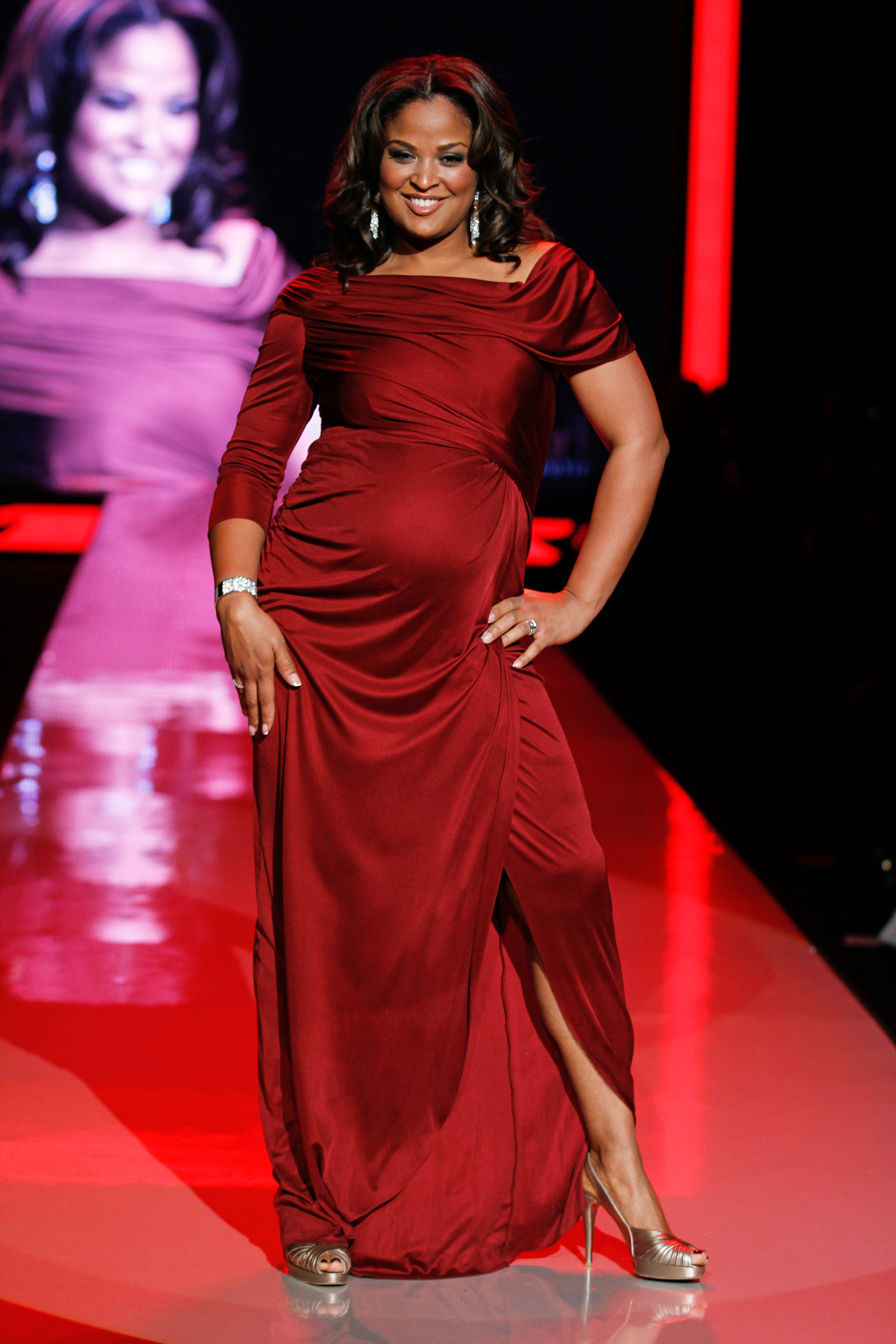
Ali modeling at the 2011 Heart Truth fashion show

She won the IBA title with a second-round knockout of Suzette Taylor on August 17, 2002, in Las Vegas. On November 8, she retained that title and unified the crown by adding the WIBA and IWBF belts with an eight-round TKO win over her division's other world champion, Valerie Mahfood, in Las Vegas. Ali stopped a bloodied Mahfood in eight rounds. On June 21, 2003, Mahfood and Ali fought a rematch, this time in Los Angeles. Once again bloodied by Ali, Mahfood lost by TKO in six rounds while trying to recover her world title. Nevertheless, Ali suffered a bad cut on her right eyelid for the first time in her career, inflicted by Mahfood. Ali also suffered a bloodied nose for the second time in her career during this fight, the first being in Ali's fight with Frazier-Lyde two years previously. On August 23, 2003, Ali fought her original inspiration, Christy Martin, beating Martin by a knockout in four rounds. On July 17, 2004, Ali retained her world title, knocking out Nikki Eplion in four rounds.

On July 30, 2004, she stopped Monica Nunez in nine rounds, in her father's native city of Louisville, Kentucky. This fight was part of the undercard for the fight in which Mike Tyson was surprisingly knocked out by fringe contender Danny Williams. On September 24, 2004, Ali added the IWBF Light Heavyweight title to her resume by beating Gwendolyn O'Neil (whom she had earlier canceled a fight against) by a knockout in three rounds, at Atlanta, Georgia. On February 1, 2005, in Atlanta, Ali scored a commanding and decisive eighth-round technical knockout over Cassandra Geiggar in a ten-round fight.

On June 11, 2005, on the undercard to the Tyson-Kevin McBride fight, Ali defeated Erin Toughill in round three to remain undefeated and won the World Boxing Council title in addition to defending her WIBA crown. She was the second woman to win a WBC title (Jackie Nava was the first). Toughill and Ali disliked each other, and prior to the fight Toughill joked about Ali. Ali promised she would punish Toughill, much like her father did with Ernie Terrell back in 1967. On December 17, 2005, in Berlin, Ali fought and defeated Åsa Sandell by TKO in the fifth round. Following Ali's hard right to Sandell's face with 17 seconds remaining in Round 5, Sandell was struck by numerous undefended shots to her head. The referee stopped the bout with 12 seconds remaining. Muhammad Ali was in attendance and kissed his daughter.

While a guest on Quite Frankly with Stephen A. Smith on June 7, 2006, Ali announced that she would be making a world tour, and said that she was looking forward to fighting Ann Wolfe in October 2006. However, the fight with Wolfe never materialized. Instead, on November 11, 2006, Ali fought and defeated Shelley Burton by TKO in the fourth round. Ali was rescheduled to fight O'Neil in Cape Town, on August 5, 2006, but Ali pulled out amid allegations of fraud. The match eventually took place in South Africa on February 2, 2007. Ali defeated O'Neil in the first-round by technical knockout. It was Ali's last professional fight.

== Professional boxing record ==
24 fights	24 wins	0 losses
By knockout	21	0
By decision	3	0

No.	Result	Record	Opponent	Type	Round, time	Date	Location	Notes
24	Win	24–0	Gwendolyn O'Neil	TKO	1 (10), 0:56	Feb 3, 2007	Kempton Park, South Africa	Retained WBC female and WIBA super middleweight titles
23	Win	23–0	Shelley Burton	TKO	4 (10), 1:58	Nov 11, 2006	New York City, New York, U.S.	Retained WBC female and WIBA super middleweight titles
22	Win	22–0	Åsa Sandell	TKO	5 (10), 1:51	Dec 17, 2005	Berlin, Germany	
21	Win	21–0	Erin Toughill	TKO	3 (10), 1:54	Jun 11, 2005	Washington, D.C., Washington, U.S.	Retained WIBA super middleweight title; Won inaugural WBC female super middleweight title
20	Win	20–0	Cassandra Geiggar	TKO	8 (10), 1:13	Feb 11, 2005	Atlanta, Georgia, U.S.	Retained WIBA super middleweight title
19	Win	19–0	Gwendolyn O'Neil	KO	3 (10), 1:59	Sep 24, 2004	Atlanta, Georgia, U.S.	Won vacant WIBF light heavyweight title
18	Win	18–0	Monica Nunez	TKO	9 (10), 0:42	Jul 30, 2004	Louisville, Kentucky, U.S.	Retained WIBF super middleweight title
17	Win	17–0	Nikki Eplion	TKO	4 (10), 1:30	Jul 17, 2004	Bowie, Maryland, U.S.	Retained IBA female super middleweight title
16	Win	16–0	Christy Martin	KO	4 (10), 0:28	Aug 23, 2003	Biloxi, Mississippi, U.S.	Retained IBA female super middleweight title
15	Win	15–0	Valerie Mahfood	TKO	6 (8), 1:17	June 21, 2003	Los Angeles, California, U.S.	
14	Win	14–0	Mary Ann Almager	TKO	4 (10), 0:55	Feb 14, 2003	Louisville, Kentucky, U.S.	Retained IBA, WIBF, and WIBA super-middleweight titles
13	Win	13–0	Valerie Mahfood	TKO	8 (10), 1:14	Nov 8, 2002	Las Vegas, Nevada, U.S.	Retained IBA female super middleweight title; Won WIBF and WIBA super middleweight titles
12	Win	12–0	Suzette Taylor	TKO	2 (10), 1:11	Aug 17, 2002	Las Vegas, Nevada, U.S.	Won inaugural IBA female super middleweight title
11	Win	11–0	Shirvelle Williams	UD	6	Jun 7, 2002	Southaven, Mississippi, U.S.	
10	Win	10–0	Jacqui Frazier-Lyde	MD	8	Jun 8, 2001	Verona, New York, U.S.	
9	Win	9–0	Christine Robinson	TKO	5 (6), 1:50	Mar 2, 2001	Verona, New York, U.S.	
8	Win	8–0	Kendra Lenhart	UD	6	Oct 20, 2000	Auburn Hills, Michigan, U.S.	
7	Win	7–0	Marjorie Jones	TKO	1 (6), 1:08	Jun 15, 2000	Universal City, California, U.S.	
6	Win	6–0	Kristina King	TKO	4 (4), 0:37	Apr 22, 2000	Guangzhou, China	
5	Win	5–0	Karen Bill	TKO	3 (4), 1:40	Apr 8, 2000	Detroit, Michigan, U.S.	
4	Win	4–0	Crystal Arcand	KO	1 (4), 1:10	Mar 7, 2000	Windsor, Ontario, Canada	
3	Win	3–0	Nicolyn Armstrong	TKO	2 (4), 1:00	Dec 10, 1999	Cobo Center, Detroit, Michigan, U.S.	
2	Win	2–0	Shadina Pennybaker	TKO	4 (4), 1:47	Nov 11, 1999	Mountaineer Casino, Racetrack and Resort, Chester, West Virginia, U.S.	
1	Win	1–0	April Fowler	KO	1 (4), 0:31	Oct 8, 1999	Turning Stone Resort Casino, Verona, New York, U.S.	

== Championships and accomplishments ==
- 2012: AOCA Awakening Outstanding Contribution Award
- 2005/2007: WBC World Super Middleweight title (two defenses)
- 2002/2007: WIBA World Super Middleweight title (five defenses)
- 2004: IWBF Female Light Heavyweight title
- 2002/2004: IWBF Female Super Middleweight title (two defenses)
- 2002/2004: IBA Female Super Middleweight title (four defenses)

== Television work ==
In 2000, Ali played herself in an episode of The Jersey called "Bat Girl" in which Morgan Hudson (played by Courtnee Draper) turns to her in order to get a little more of a perspective as she learns the true meaning of girl power. In 2002, she appeared as herself on the UPN sitcoms One on One and Girlfriends. In early 2002, Ali appeared in a boxing role for the music video "Deny" by Canadian hard rock band Default. The video gained airplay on music channels including MTV2 and MMUSA. In 2004, Ali appeared on the George Lopez show, where she owned a gym, as well as on Real Husbands of Hollywood.

In mid-2007, Ali was a participant in season four of the American version of the television show Dancing with the Stars; she had no previous dancing experience. She and her professional dancing partner, Maksim Chmerkovskiy, were widely praised by the judges, receiving the first "10" from judge Len Goodman for their rumba. They came in third place in the competition, losing to Apolo Anton Ohno (with Julianne Hough) and Joey Fatone (with Kym Johnson).

Dancing with the Stars performances

Week #	Dance / Song	Judges' scores			Result
Week #	Dance / Song	Inaba	Goodman	Tonioli	Result
1	Foxtrot / "How Sweet It Is (To Be Loved by You)"	7	8	8	No Elimination
2	Mambo / "Maracaibo Oriental"	9	9	9	Safe
3	Tango / "Goldfinger"	7	7	7	Safe
4	Paso Doble / "Les Toreadors"	7	7	7	Safe
5	Rumba / "Put Your Records On"	9	10	9	Safe
6	Cha-Cha-Cha / "Hold on, I'm Comin'"	9	9	10	Safe
7	Quickstep / "Part-Time Lover"; Samba / "Brazil"	10; 10	9; 10	10; 10	Safe
8	Waltz / "May Each Day"; Jive / "Bad, Bad Leroy Brown"	9; 9	9; 8	9; 9	Safe
9 Semi-finals	Quickstep / "Walk Like an Egyptian"; Cha-Cha-Cha / "She's a Lady"	10; 10	10; 10	10; 10	Safe
10; Finals	Paso Doble / "España Cani"; Freestyle / "Shake Your Body (Down to the Ground)"; Mambo / "Maracaibo Oriental"	10; 9; 10	9; 8; 10	10; 9; 10	Third Place

Ali hosted the revival of American Gladiators alongside Hulk Hogan. The show premiered in January 2008. Ali and the cast of American Gladiators appeared on the NBC show Celebrity Family Feud (Roker) in an episode that aired on July 8, 2008. Ali joined the CBS team as a contributing correspondent on The Early Show with her first appearance in early January 2008.

She hosted The N's Student Body, a reality show on The N. Ali also appeared in a 2007 episode of Yo Gabba Gabba!, titled "Train", in a brief dance number, and on Love That Girl, episode 3.4, "Fighting Shape".

In 2012, Ali was picked to co-host Everyday Health with Ethan Zohn and Jenna Morasca. The show aired on ABC Saturday mornings and profiled everyday people living with health issues, who aspired to not let their issues keep them from helping others or doing extraordinary things. The show lasted for one season. Also in 2012, Ali appeared in a Kohl's commercial with a tag line, "I box to win; I shop to win.". Ali was a contestant on the NBC celebrity reality competition series called Stars Earn Stripes from August 2012 to September 2012.

On February 4, 2013, Ali appeared on the NBC reality series, The Biggest Loser in the episode "Lead By Example". In the episode, she boxed alongside Dolvett Quince's team, consisting of Jackson Carter, Joe Ostaszewski and Francelina Morillo. In March 2013, Ali started appearing as a co-host on multiple episodes of the E! talk show series Fashion Police filling in for Giuliana Rancic, who was on maternity leave. In May 2013, Ali once again filled in for Rancic, who had other commitments and was unable to attend the show.

In May 2014, Ali participated in an episode of Celebrity Wife Swap. She swapped places with singer Angie Stone and tried to instill healthier habits on the family. In April 2013, Ali participated in two episodes of Chopped: All Stars, making it to the final round, competing for a favorite charity. In September 2013, Ali began hosting All In with Laila Ali, a new show in the CBS Saturday morning lineup "CBS Dream Team". The following year, she began hosting Late Night Chef Fight on the cable network FYI. In 2014, she appeared in the film Falcon Rising. She was a participant of The New Celebrity Apprentice (also known as The Apprentice 15 and The Celebrity Apprentice 8) but terminated after 11th task.

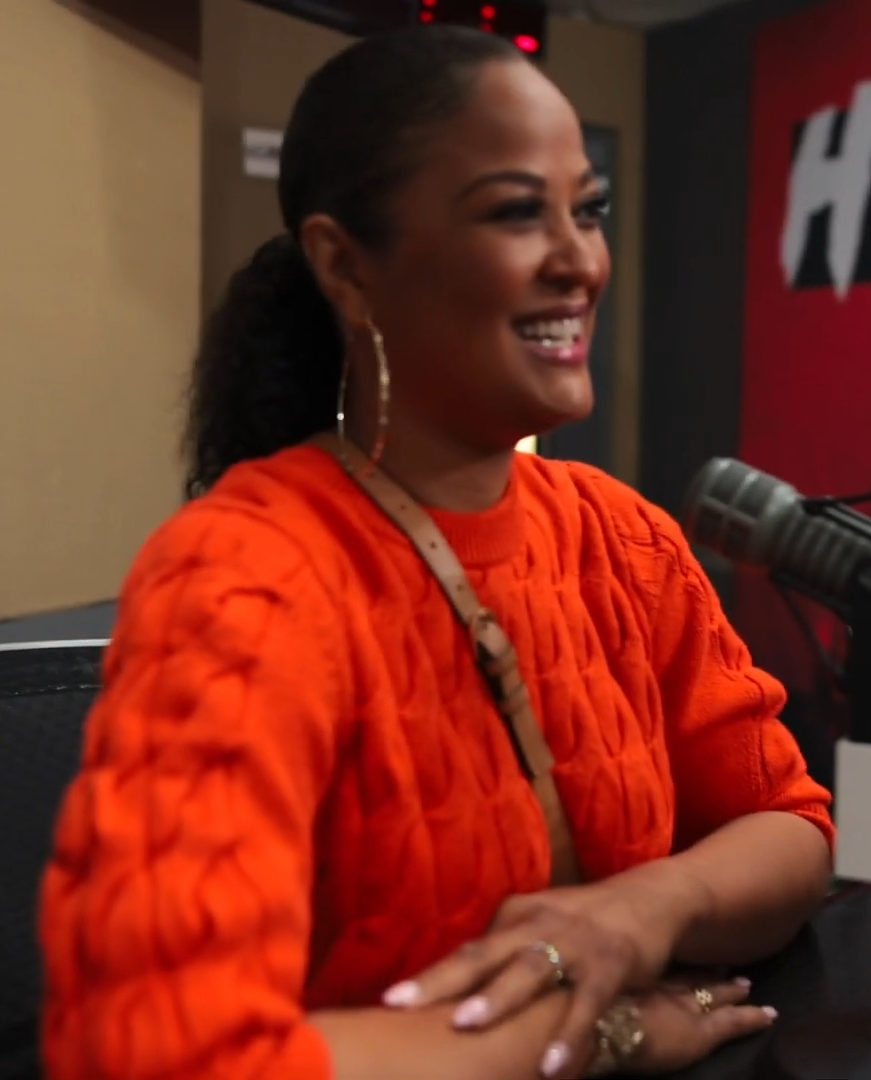
Ali in an interview with WHTA in 2024

Since 2017, Ali has been the host of the DIY series Home Made Simple on the Oprah Winfrey Network.

In 2019, Ali participated in the second season of The Masked Singer as "Panda". She was eliminated at the end of her episode. Before her official unmasking, Panda was jokingly revealed to be Homer Simpson in a promotion for The Simpsons, another primetime FOX series.

In 2020, Ali voiced herself in the Scooby-Doo and Guess Who? episode "The Crown Jewel of Boxing."

Ali has appeared multiple times as a TV analyst for large boxing events, most recently being the events aired on Netflix

== Personal life ==
In 2002, she wrote (with co-author David Ritz) the book Reach! Finding Strength, Spirit, and Personal Power. In this book, she confides that she felt isolated at times because of her father's fame. Ali has also spent some time in jail, and describes her arrests and the physical abuse she experienced in jail. Ali married Johnny "Yahya" McClain on August 27, 2000. McClain became Ali's manager and helped guide her career. In late 2005, Ali and McClain divorced and McClain quit managing Ali.

On July 23, 2007, Ali married former NFL player Curtis Conway in Los Angeles. They have two children together: a son born in August 2008, and a daughter born in April 2011. Ali is the stepmother of Conway's three children. Professional wrestling legend Hulk Hogan credited Ali with saving his life by telephoning him when he was depressed and suicidal. Ali is the sister-in-law of professional mixed martial artist Kevin Casey, who is married to her sister Hana.

== Bibliography ==
- Ali, Laila; Ritz, David (2002). Reach!: Finding Strength, Spirit, and Personal Power. Hyperion. ISBN 0786868554.

== See also ==
- List of female boxers
- List of WBC female world champions

== General sources ==
- NetGlimse.com (2009). Laila Ali – Biography . Retrieved October 8, 2010 from Laila Ali Biography, Bio, Profile, pictures, photos from Netglimse.com
- "Laila Ali follows boxing career of legendary father Muhammad Ali". Jet. 95 (21). 2010. Archived from the original on November 16, 2010 – via FindArticles.
- Andrew Rooney. (2003). Years of Minutes. New York: Essay Productions. Retrieved from NetLibrary database.
- "Boxing". Black Firsts. 2003.
- Lexis Nexis. (2009). Laila Ali. Retrieved from Lexis Nexis database.

Preceded by Valerie Mahfood	2nd IWBF World Super Middleweight Champion; November 8, 2002 – 2007	Current holder
Preceded by Valerie Mahfood	2nd WIBA World Super Middleweight Champion; November 8, 2002 – 2007	Vacant Title next held by Natascha Ragosina
New title	1st WBC Female World Super Middleweight Champion; November 11, 2006 – 2007	Vacant Title next held by Natascha Ragosina
