= Valerie Mahfood =

American boxer (born 1974)

Personal information
- Nickname: The Big Bad Wolfe
- Born: Valerie Rebecca Mahfood; February 2, 1974 (age 52) Tyler, Texas, U.S.
- Height: 1.73 m (5 ft 8 in)
- Weight: Middleweight and light heavyweight

Boxing career
- Reach: 1.70 m (67 in)
- Stance: Orthodox

Boxing record
- Total fights: 37
- Wins: 19
- Win by KO: 9
- Losses: 14
- Draws: 4
- No contests: 0

Valerie Rebecca Mahfood (born February 1, 1974) is a female boxer who is a former world Super Middleweight and Light Heavyweight champion. Known as "The Big Bad Wolfe", Mahfood is known in the boxing world by her brawling style of fighting, and by her traditional trademark purple mohawk. She now resides in Groves, Texas.

== Career ==
Mahfood began boxing professionally on July 27, 1997, knocking out Jeanne Martinez in the first round, in Baton Rouge, Louisiana. On April 23, 1998, she beat Brenda Cooper by a four round decision in Houston, marking her Texas debut.

She lost two of her next three fights, but she rebounded to win five fights in a row, which earned her first title try: on September 17, 1999, she knocked out Kathy Rivers in ten rounds at Panama City, Panama, to conquer the WIBF's world Light Heavyweight title. This was also her first fight abroad.

She won three non-title bouts after that, and then, on August 10, 2000, she went down in weight to the Super Middleweight division, to fight Mary Ann Almager for the vacant IWBF title. She won her second title, with a fifth round knockout of Almager in Houston. On her next fight, she became the first boxer to defeat Ann Wolfe, knocking her out in three rounds. And till this day it stands as Ann Wolfe's only career loss.

On November 16, 2001, she won the WIBA title by outpointing Trina Ortegon over ten rounds at Austin, and, shortly after, she beat Almager again, by an eight round split decision.

Mahfood and Laila Ali met in a long-awaited bout on November 8, 2002 in Las Vegas, Nevada, It was ESPN 2 Friday night fights series most view telecast and it was the first time a female world title fight was the main event on ESPN. A bloodied Mahfood was stopped by Ali in eight rounds, in a fight that unified the IWBF and WIBA world titles. On June 21, 2003, Mahfood and Ali had a rematch, this time in Los Angeles Staple Center on the undercard of the Lennox Lewis vs Vitali Klitschko World heavyweight Title. Mahfood lost by TKO in six while trying to recover her world title. Ali, however, suffered a serious cut (to her right eyelid) for the first (and to date, only) time in her boxing career (along with a bloodied nose). Ali retains a permanent scar from the encounter.

She won four of her next six fights, the lone loss in that span being a unanimous decision in a rematch against Wolfe. She also had a draw (tie) against Kathy Rivers, in a rematch of their Panama bout which Mahfood had won.

On September 24, 2004, Mahfood, sporting her traditional trademark purple Mohawk hairstyle, was dropped twice in the final seconds as she dropped a ten round unanimous decision to Leatitia Robinson in Atlanta, Georgia.

On November 6, 2004, Mahfood TKOd Yolanda Swindell in the second round.

Mahfood then went to Germany, and lost a 10 round unanimous decision to Natasha Ragosina.

On August 20, 2005, Mahfood fought Ann Wolfe, losing a ten round decision to Wolfe. In 2007 Mahfood fought Mary Jo Sanders for a world title.

She was inducted into the International Women's Boxing Hall of Fame in 2020.

== Professional boxing record ==
37 fights	19 wins	14 losses
By knockout	8	5
By decision	11	9
Draws	4	

No.	Result	Record	Opponent	Type	Round, time	Date	Location	Notes
37	Draw	19-14-4	Christy Martin	MD	8	2008-07-18	Reliant Arena, Houston, Texas, US	vacant NABF female middleweight title
36	Loss	19-14-3	Yvonne Reis	UD		2007-11-24	Paragon Casino & Resort, Marksville, Louisiana, US	
35	Loss	19-13-3	Mary Jo Sanders	UD	10	2007-03-30	Cobo Hall, Detroit, Michigan, US	International Boxing Association female middleweight title
34	Loss	19-12-3	Veronica Rucker	UD		2006-11-04	Coushatta Casino Resort, Kinder, Louisiana, US	
33	Draw	19-11-3	Alexandra Maloy	PTS		2006-07-08	Coushatta Casino Resort, Kinder, Louisiana, US	
32	Loss	19-11-2	Ijeoma Egbunine	KO		2006-02-18	Lawrence Joel Veterans Memorial Coliseum, Winston-Salem, North Carolina, US	vacant Women's International Boxing Federation World light heavyweight title
31	Draw	19-10-2	Yolanda Swindell	PTS		2005-09-17	Coushatta Casino Resort, Kinder, Louisiana, US	
30	Loss	19-10-1	Ann Wolfe	UD	10	2005-08-20	Isle of Capri Casino, Biloxi, Mississippi, US	
29	Loss	19-9-1	Natascha Ragosina	UD	10	2005-07-09	Life Sportpark Herrenkrug, Magdeburg, Sachsen-Anhalt, Germany	
28	Win	19-8-1	Borislava Goranova	UD		2005-04-02	Ofen Stadthalle, Velten, Brandenburg, Germany	
27	Win	18-8-1	Yolanda Swindell	TKO		2004-11-06	Grand Casino Coushatta, Kinder, Louisiana, US	
26	Loss	17-8-1	Leatitia Robinson	UD	10	2004-09-24	Philips Arena, Atlanta, Georgia, US	
25	Win	17-7-1	Carlette Ewell	UD	10	2004-08-28	Grand Casino Coushatta, Kinder, Louisiana, US	
24	Draw	16-7-1	Kathy Rivers	PTS		2004-04-16	Stafford Center, Houston, Texas, US	
23	Win	16-7	Carlette Ewell	SD	8	2004-02-20	Civic Center, Beaumont, Texas, US	
22	Win	15-7	Yolanda Swindell	MD		2004-01-15	Arena Theatre, Houston, Texas, US	
21	Win	14-7	Carley Pesente	TKO		2003-10-11	Emerald Queen Casino, Tacoma, Washington, US	
20	Loss	13-7	Ann Wolfe	UD	10	2003-08-23	Mississippi Coast Coliseum, Biloxi, Mississippi, US	vacant WBA-NABA female super middleweight title9-
19	Loss	13-6	Laila Ali	TKO	6 (8), 1:17	2003-06-21	Staples Center, Los Angeles, California, US	
18	Loss	13-5	Laila Ali	TKO	8 (10), 1:14	2002-11-08	Stratosphere Hotel & Casino, Las Vegas, Nevada, US	Women's International Boxing Association World super middleweight title International Women's Boxing Federation World super middleweight title International Boxing Association female super middleweight title
17	Win	13-4	Mary Ann Almager	SD	8	2002-06-14	Civic Center, Beaumont, Texas, US	
16	Win	12-4	Trina Ortegon	UD		2001-11-16	Convention Center, Austin, Texas, US	Women's International Boxing Association World super middleweight title
15	Loss	11-4	Kendra Lenhart	KO		2001-04-19	Civic Center, Beaumont, Texas, US	
14	Win	11-3	Ann Wolfe	TKO	3 (6), 1:17	2000-11-30	Radisson Hotel, Houston, Texas, US	
13	Win	10-3	Mary Ann Almager	TKO	5(10)	2000-08-10	Astro Hall, Houston, Texas, US	vacant International Women's Boxing Federation World super middleweight title
12	Win	9-3	Genevia Buckhalter	UD		2000-06-16	Casino Magic, Bay Saint Louis, Mississippi, US	
11	Win	8-3	Monica McGowan	TKO		2000-04-20	Civic Center, Beaumont, Texas, US	
10	Win	7-3	Genevia Buckhalter	UD		1999-11-18	Radisson Hotel, Houston, Texas, US	
9	Win	6-3	Kathy Rivers	TKO		1999-09-17	Gimnasio Nuevo Panama, Panama City, Panama	International Women's Boxing Federation World light heavyweight title Women's International Boxing Federation World light heavyweight title
8	Win	5-3	Thistle Colleps	UD		1999-07-15	Radisson Hotel, Houston, Texas, US	
7	Loss	4-3	Kathy Rivers	UD		1999-05-27	Gold Strike Casino, Tunica, Mississippi, US	
6	Win	4-2	Genevia Buckhalter	TKO		1999-05-08	Silver Star Casino, Philadelphia, Mississippi, US	
5	Loss	3-2	Kendra Lenhart	KO		1998-12-02	New Orleans, Louisiana, US	
4	Loss	3-1	Mitzi Jeter	UD		1998-07-19	Lake Charles, Louisiana, US	
3	Win	3-0	Thistle Colleps	TKO		1998-06-24	Harvey, Louisiana, US	
2	Win	2-0	Brenda Cooper	UD		1998-04-23	Sheraton Hotel, Houston, Texas, US	
1	Win	1-0	Jeanne Martinez	TKO		1997-07-18	New Orleans, Louisiana, US	
