= Tanzee Daniel =

Trinidad and Tobago boxer (born 1976)

- Born: Tanzee Daniel; 26 December 1976 (age 49); San Fernando, Trinidad
- Other names: Sweet Tea
- Nationality: Trinidadian; American
- Height: 173 cm (5 ft 8 in)
- Weight: 252 lb (114 kg; 18 st 0 lb)
- Division: Heavyweight
- Style: Boxing
- Stance: Southpaw
- Years active: 2006, 2008 - 2009, 2011 - 2014

Professional boxing record
- Total: 9
- Wins: 4
- By knockout: 1
- Losses: 4
- By knockout: 0
- Draws: 1

Other information
- Occupation: Boxer
- Boxing record from BoxRec
- Last updated on: 15 March 2017

Tanzee Daniel (born 26 December 1976, San Fernando, Trinidad) is a retired female professional boxer.

On 8 November 2014, Daniel fought Martha Salazar for the vacant WBC female heavyweight title, losing by unanimous decision.

== Professional boxing record ==
9 fights	4 wins	4 losses
By knockout	1	0
By decision	3	4
Draws	1	

No.	Result	Record	Opponent	Type	Round, time	Date	Location	Notes
9	Lose	4–4–1	(United States) Martha Salazar	UD	10	8 Nov 2014	(United States) Longshoremen's Hall, San Francisco, California, USA	vacant WBC World female heavyweight title
8	Lose	4–3–1	(United States) Sonya Lamonakis	UD	6	14 Aug 2013	(United States) BB King Blues Club & Grill, New York, New York, USA	
7	Lose	4–2–1	(United States) Sonya Lamonakis	MD	6	29 Sep 2012	(United States) MGM Grand at Foxwoods Resort, Mashantucket, Connecticut, USA	
6	Draw	4–1–1	(United States) Tiffany Woodard	SD	6	21 Apr 2012	(United States) Rising Star Casino, Rising Sun, Indiana, USA	
5	Lose	4–1	(United States) Sonya Lamonakis	UD	6	12 Mar 2011	(United States) MGM Grand at Foxwoods Resort, Mashantucket, Connecticut, USA	
4	Win	4–0	(Colombia) Maria Mancilla	TKO	2 (6)	3 May 2009	(Trinidad and Tobago) Queen's Park Oval, Port-of-Spain, Trinidad	
3	Win	3–0	(United States) Tiffany Woodard	UD	4	16 Aug 2008	(United States) Renaissance Portsmouth Hotel, Portsmouth, Virginia, USA	
2	Win	2–0	(United States) Tiffany Woodard	SD	4	11 Jul 2008	(United States) National Guard Armory, Philadelphia, Pennsylvania, USA	
1	Win	1–0	(United States) Angela Brooks	UD	4	24 Dec 2006	(United States) The Roxy, Boston, Massachusetts, USA	Professional debut
