= Pamela London =

Guyanese boxer (born 1973)

Personal information
- Nickname: Grenade
- Nationality: Guyanese
- Born: 13 September 1973 (age 52) Guyana
- Weight: Heavyweight

Boxing career
- Stance: Orthodox

Boxing record
- Total fights: 12
- Wins: 6
- Win by KO: 1
- Losses: 5
- Draws: 1

Pamela London (born 13 September 1973) is a Guyanese former professional boxer who competed from 2003 to 2010. She challenged twice for the WIBF heavyweight title in 2004 and 2009.

== Career ==
On 29 August 2003, London made her professional debut, drawing (tying) in four rounds with Geraldine Cox, another promising Guyanese fighter who would later turn into a common opponent for London.

She faced Cox again on her second professional fight, losing a four round unanimous decision on her second fight, held on 1 November.

On 26 December London had her first win, defeating Shelly Gibson by a four round decision in Georgetown.

London began 2004 on 1 February by defeating Shondell Parks by an eight round unanimous decision, once again in Georgetown. After this win, London was ranked among the top-10 contenders by the IWBF in the women's heavyweight category.

On 16 April she beat Krystal Lessey by a unanimous decision, further enhancing her condition as a championship challenger.

Her third bout with Cox came on 21 May, and London earned a title shot by beating Cox, once again by decision.

Her first world title try came on 28 November when she met Martha Salazar for the IWBF's world Heavyweight title. Once again fighting in front of her home-crowd, London lost when she was knocked out in seven rounds by Salazar.

London lost by knockout to Natascha Ragosina in 2009 while contesting for the WIBF world heavyweight title.

== Professional boxing record ==
12 fights	6 wins	5 losses
By knockout	1	2
By decision	5	3
Draws	1	

No.	Result	Record	Opponent	Type	Round, time	Date	Location	Notes
12	Loss	6–5–1	(Guyana) Gwendolyn O'Neil	UD	6	6 Nov 2010	Princess Hotel and Casino, Providence, Guyana	
11	Loss	6–4–1	(Russia) Natalya Ragozina	KO	8 (10)	19 Dec 2009	DIVS, Ekaterinburg, Russia	For vacant WIBF, and WBF female heavyweight titles
10	Win	6–3–1	(Guyana) Veronica Blackman	MD	8	5 Jul 2008	Cliff Anderson Sports Hall, Georgetown, Guyana	Won vacant WBC International female heavyweight title
9	Win	5–3–1	(Trinidad and Tobago) Kim Quashie	TKO	7 (10)	23 Sep 2005	Jean Pierre Sports Complex, Port-of-Spain, Trinidad and Tobago	
8	Loss	4–3–1	(Guyana) Gwendolyn O'Neil	PTS	8	9 Jul 2005	Georgetown, Guyana	
7	Loss	4–2–1	(United States) Martha Salazar	TKO	9 (10)	28 Nov 2004	Splashmins Fun Park, Georgetown, Guyana	For vacant WIBF heavyweight title
6	Win	4–1–1	(Guyana) Geraldine Cox	UD	6	29 May 2004	National Park, Georgetown, Guyana	
5	Win	3–1–1	(Trinidad and Tobago) Krystal Lessey	PTS	6	16 Apr 2004	Cliff Anderson Sports Hall, Georgetown, Guyana	
4	Win	2–1–1	(Guyana) Shondell Parks	UD	8	21 Feb 2004	Mackenzie Sports Club, Linden, Guyana	
3	Win	1–1–1	(Guyana) Shelly Gibson	PTS	4	26 Dec 2003	Cliff Anderson Sports Hall, Georgetown, Guyana	
2	Loss	0–1–1	(Guyana) Geraldine Cox	UD	4	1 Nov 2003	Mackenzie Sports Club, Linden, Guyana	
1	Draw	0–0–1	(Guyana) Geraldine Cox	PTS	4	29 Aug 2003	Mackenzie Sports Club, Linden, Guyana	
