= Teresa Perozzi =

American-Bermudan boxer (born 1973)

Personal information
- Nationality: Bermudian
- Born: Teresa Maria Perozzi; 31 December 1973 (age 52) New Hampshire, United States
- Height: 5 ft 6 1/2 in (169 cm)
- Weight: Middleweight; Super-middleweight

Boxing career
- Reach: 68 in (173 cm)
- Stance: Southpaw

Boxing record
- Total fights: 17
- Wins: 9
- Win by KO: 1
- Losses: 5
- Draws: 3

Teresa Perozzi (born 31 December 1974) is an American-born Bermudian former professional boxer who competed from 2003 to 2014. She held the WBA female middleweight title from 2011 to 2012 and also challenged for multiple world titles throughout her career; the WBA, WBC, WIBF, and WIBA super-middleweight titles in 2008; the WBO female middleweight title in 2010; and the WBC female middleweight title twice in 2012 and 2013.

She has fought in her career Natascha Ragosina and Aasa Sandell among others.

On November 21, 2014, in her first fight in almost two years, Perozzi was beaten - due to referee stoppage - in the third round at the Fairmont, Southampton by Kali Reis in a match for the vacant International Boxing Association women's middleweight title. She retired after this loss.

== Championship titles ==
- WBA Female Middleweight title
  - Two title defenses
- WBO Female Middleweight title
- WBC International Middleweight title
- NABC Middleweight title
- WIBC Middleweight title

== Professional boxing record ==
17 fights	9 wins	5 losses
By knockout	1	1
By decision	8	4
Draws	3	

Boxing record
No.	Result	Record	Opponent	Type	Round, time	Date	Location	Notes
17	Loss	9–5–3	(United States) Kali Reis	TKO	3 (10), 0:51	21 Nov 2014	Fairmont Southampton Resort, Southampton Parish, Bermuda	For vacant IBA female middleweight title
16	Draw	9–4–3	(United States) Tori Nelson	SD	10	2 Feb 2013	Berkeley Institute Gym, Pembroke Parish, Bermuda	For vacant WBC female middleweight title
15	Draw	9–4–2	(United States) Tori Nelson	MD	10	13 Oct 2012	Southampton Parish, Bermuda	Retained WBA Female middleweight title. For vacant WBC female middleweight title
14	Win	9–4–1	(United States) April Ward	UD	10	10 Mar 2012	Berkeley Institute Gym, Pembroke Parish, Bermuda	Retained WBA female middleweight title
13	Win	8–4–1	(United States) Lorissa Rivas	SD	10	30 Dec 2011	Woodebook Youth Centre, Port of Spain, Trinidad and Tobago	Won vacant WBA and WBC International female middleweight titles
12	Loss	7–4–1	(Germany) Christina Hammer	UD	10	23 Oct 2010	Erdgas Arena, Riesa, Germany	For vacant WBO Female middleweight title
11	Win	7–3–1	(United States) Cimberly Harris	UD	6	24 Jul 2010	Berkeley Institute Gym, Pembroke Parish, Bermuda	
10	Loss	6–3–1	(Russia) Natascha Ragosina	UD	10	15 Mar 2008	Maritim Hotel, Magdeburg, Germany	For WBA, WBC, WIBF, WIBA, GBU, and vacant IWBF, and WIBC super-middleweight titles
9	Draw	6–2–1	(Sweden) Åsa Sandell	PTS	6	15 Sep 2007	Löfbergs Arena, Karlstad, Sweden	For WBE and vacant WBC International middleweight titles
8	Win	6–2	(United States) Yvonne Reis	UD	6	23 Jun 2007	Berkeley Institute Gym, Pembroke Parish, Bermuda	
7	Win	5–2	(United States) Roselin Morales	UD	10	22 Jul 2006	Clearwater Beach, St. David's Island, Bermuda	Won NABC female middleweight title
6	Win	4–2	(United States) Martha Deitchman	UD	8	18 Feb 2006	Cedarbridge Academy, Devonshire Parish, Bermuda	
5	Win	3–2	(Trinidad and Tobago) Scroller Carrington	TKO	6 (10)	23 Sep 2005	Jean Pierre Sports Complex, Mucurapo, Port of Spain, Trinidad and Tobago	Won WIBC middleweight title
4	Loss	2–2	(United States) Laura Ramsey	UD	4	9 Apr 2005	Number One Shed, Hamilton, Bermuda	
3	Win	2–1	(United States) Elizabeth Kerin	UD	4	5 Mar 2005	Number One Shed, Hamilton, Bermuda	
2	Loss	1–1	(Dominican Republic) Monica Nunez	UD	4	12 Jun 2004	Cedarbridge Academy, Devonshire Parish, Bermuda	
1	Win	1–0	(United States) Nicole Conant	SD	4	21 Mar 2003	(United States) The Alladin, Las Vegas, Nevada, US	
