= Alejandra Jiménez =

Mexican boxer (born 1987)

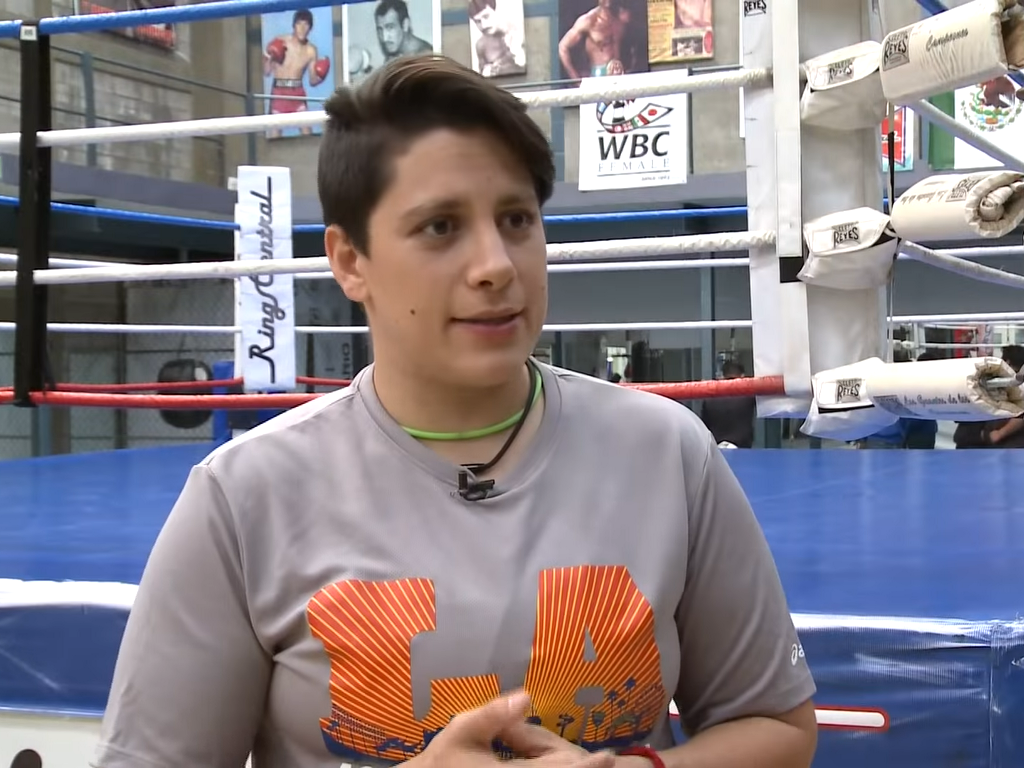

Personal information
- Nickname: La Tigre
- Born: Alejandra Jiménez Ayala; 29 August 1987 (age 38) Mexico City, Mexico
- Height: 5 ft 11 in (180 cm)
- Weight: Super middleweight; Heavyweight

Boxing career
- Reach: 67 1/2 in (171 cm)
- Stance: Orthodox

Boxing record
- Total fights: 14
- Wins: 12
- Win by KO: 9
- Losses: 0
- Draws: 1
- No contests: 1

Alejandra Jiménez Ayala (born 29 August 1987) is a Mexican former professional boxer who held the World Boxing Council (WBC) heavyweight title from 2016 to 2018. She also won the WBC and World Boxing Organization (WBO) super middleweight titles in 2020 but was stripped a short time later after failing a drug test.

== Career ==
Jiménez took up boxing at the age of 23 in order to lose weight and went on to become a world champion less than four years later. Before turning pro Jiménez won 10 amateur bouts, half of them coming against male boxers. Jiménez is the former WBC female heavyweight champion and the second Mexican-born boxer to hold a world heavyweight title, first being Martha Salazar who Jiménez won the title from on 18 March 2016.

She defeated Franchón Crews-Dezurn by split decision to win the WBC and WBO female super middleweight titles on 11 January 2020. However, in February 2020, the result of the fight was changed to a "no decision," due to Jimenez having failed a pre-fight drug test and she was subsequently suspended for nine months and stripped of the titles.

In December 2022, Jiménez retired from professional boxing amid allegations that she was born male. In response to the allegations, Jiménez stated that she has hypothyroidism.

== Professional boxing record ==
14 fights	12 wins	0 losses
By knockout	9	0
By decision	3	0
Draws	1	
No contests	1	

No.	Result	Record	Opponent	Type	Round, time	Date	Location	Notes
14	NC	12–0–1 (1)	(United States) Franchón Crews-Dezurn	NC	10	11 Jan 2020	(United States) Alamodome, San Antonio, U.S.	WBC and WBO female super middleweight titles were at stake; Originally SD win for Jiménez, later ruled NC after she failed a drug test
13	Win	12–0–1	(Mexico) Irais Hernandez	UD	8	16 Feb 2019	Oasis Hotel Complex, Cancún, Mexico	
12	Win	11–0–1	(Mexico) Katerin Vindiola	TKO	3 (8)	2 Sep 2018	Grand Oasis Arena, Cancún, Mexico	
11	Draw	10–0–1	(Mexico) Irais Hernandez	MD	8	14 Apr 2018	Grand Oasis Arena, Cancún, Mexico	
10	Win	10–0	(Mexico) Maria Jose Velis	TKO	1 (8)	25 Nov 2017	Palenque de Deportes, Chetumal, Mexico	
9	Win	9–0	(Canada) Vanessa Lepage Joanisse	TKO	3 (10)	12 Aug 2017	Arena Oasis, Cancún, Mexico	Retained WBC female heavyweight title
8	Win	8–0	(Mexico) Martha Patricia Lara Gaytan	KO	2 (8)	17 Jun 2017	Explanada Delegacion Cuauhtemoc, Mexico City, Mexico	
7	Win	7–0	(United States) Carlette Ewell	TKO	1 (10)	1 Apr 2017	Zócalo, Mexico City, Mexico	Retained WBC female heavyweight title
6	Win	6–0	(Mexico) Martha Salazar	MD	10	18 Mar 2016	Oasis Hotel Complex, Cancún, Mexico	Won WBC female heavyweight title
5	Win	5–0	(Mexico) Carmen Garcia Toscano	TKO	2 (6), 1:31	27 Nov 2015	Sindicato de Taxistas, Cancún, Mexico	
4	Win	4–0	(Mexico) Alejandra Soledad Dominguez	TKO	4 (4), 1:48	21 Aug 2015	Plaza 28 de Julio, Playa del Carmen, Mexico	
3	Win	3–0	(Mexico) Irasema Rayas	TKO	1 (4), 0:27	28 Mar 2015	Domo Deportivo, Tulum, Mexico	
2	Win	2–0	(Mexico) Mitzy Zuniga	UD	4	20 Dec 2014	Arena Quequi, Cancún, Mexico	
1	Win	1–0	(Mexico) Claudia Ramirez	TKO	3 (4); 0:19	11 Oct 2014	Oasis Hotel Complex, Cancún, Mexico	

Sporting positions
World boxing titles
Preceded by Martha Salazar	WBC female heavyweight champion March 18, 2016 – September 2018; Vacated	Vacant
Preceded by Franchón Crews-Dezurn	WBC female super middleweight champion 11 January 2020 – present Suspended	Incumbent
Preceded by Franchó Crews-Dezurn	WBO female super middleweight champion 11 January 2020 – 17 March 2020; Stripped	Vacant Reinstated Title next held by Franchón Crews-Dezurn
