= Martha Salazar =

Mexican boxer (born 1970)

- Born: February 2, 1970 (age 56); Ocotlán, Jalisco, Mexico
- Nationality: Mexican; American
- Height: 5 ft 9 in (1.75 m)
- Weight: 235 lb (107 kg; 16.8 st)
- Division: Heavyweight
- Reach: 70.0 in (178 cm)
- Style: Boxing; MMA

Professional boxing record
- Total: 18
- Wins: 13
- By knockout: 3
- Losses: 5

Mixed martial arts record
- Total: 1
- Wins: 0
- Losses: 1
- By submission: 1

Other information
- Boxing record from BoxRec
- Mixed martial arts record from Sherdog

Martha Salazar (born February 2, 1970, Ocotlán, Jalisco, Mexico) is a Mexican retired female boxer. Salazar, fought as a Heavyweight. She is former WBC world Heavyweight champion. Her nickname is "The Shadow". She hails from San Francisco, California. She was born in Ocotlan, Jalisco, Mexico (view the ESPN note at November 11;).

Salazar became the third Hispanic to become world Heavyweight champion in all of boxing's history, and the second one in women's boxing history. The first Hispanic to win a world Heavyweight championship in boxing was male boxer John Ruiz of Puerto Rico.

== Career ==
Salazar debuted as a professional boxer on March 25, 2001, defeating Denise Callahan by a four round decision in Hayward, California. She followed that victory with two back to back wins over Carley Pesente, defeating Pesente twice by four round unanimous decisions, both times in Tacoma, Washington.

Salazar won two more fights, including a six round decision win on November 16, 2002, over Kisha Snow, who had six wins and only one loss coming into their fight.

On March 1, 2003, Salazar made her Las Vegas debut. She suffered her first career defeat that night, being beaten on points over four rounds by former NCAA basketball star Vonda Ward, who ran her record to 16 victories and no losses after beating Salazar.

Salazar rebounded with her first knockout win, however, when she beat Pesente in their third bout, held on May 24, in Vallejo, California. Salazar beat Pesente in the first round.

Salazar received her first world title shot after that win, attempting to win the IBA world Heavyweight title on June 11, 2003, when she lost by a ten round decision to Ward in their rematch, held at Canton, Ohio.

On March 18, 2004, Salazar met Marsha Valley in California and she lost for the second time in a row, this time by a split six round decision.

On October 16, she and Valley met in a rematch, fighting in Oakland, for the World Boxing Empire's world super heavyweight title. The Super Heavyweight division is a division that is only recognized in amateur boxing and by a couple of women's boxing organizations. It is not recognized at all in men's boxing. Salazar avenged her earlier loss to Valley and, nevertheless, became a world champion for the first time, when she defeated Valley by an eight round unanimous decision.

Salazar went down in weight to compete for the world Heavyweight championship for the second time, when she was offered a chance to meet Pamela London for the WIBF's vacant world Heavyweight title.

On November 28, 2004, Salazar had her first fight abroad when she and London met in Guyana. With a weight of 240 pounds (109 kg) for that fight, Salazar became the WIBF world Heavyweight champion, by knocking London out in nine rounds.

On 10 February 2007, she fought Vonda Ward for the inaugural WBC female heavyweight title, losing by unanimous decision.

More than seven years later, on 8 November 2014, Salazar won the biggest title in her career, winning the WBC female heavyweight championship, defeating Tanzee Daniel by unanimous decision. She lost the title in March 2016 against Alejandra Jiménez in Mexico.

On March 14, 2017, Salazar announced her retirement from all combat fighting. She was inducted into the International Women's Boxing Hall of Fame in 2019.

== Professional boxing titles ==
- WBE female super heavyweight title (237 Ibs)
- WIBF heavyweight title (240 Ibs)
- WBE female heavyweight title (236½ Ibs)
- WBC female heavyweight title (235 Ibs)

== Combat record ==
=== Boxing ===
18 fights	13 wins	5 losses
By knockout	3	0
By decision	10	5
Draws	0	

No.	Result	Record	Opponent	Type	Round, time	Date	Location	Notes
18	Lose	13–5	(Mexico) Alejandra Jimenez	MD	10	18 Mar 2016	Oasis Hotel Complex, Cancun, Quintana Roo, Mexico	Lost WBC World female heavyweight title
17	Win	13–4	(Trinidad and Tobago) Tanzee Daniel	UD	10	8 Nov 2014	(United States) Longshoremen's Hall, San Francisco, California, USA	Won vacant WBC World female heavyweight title
16	Win	12–4	(United States) Sonya Lamonakis	UD	6	13 Apr 2013	(United States) Lions Gate Convention Center, Sacramento, California, USA	
15	Lose	11–4	(United States) Vonda Ward	MD	10	10 Feb 2007	(United States) Wolstein Center, Cleveland, Ohio, USA	vacant WIBA, vacant WBC World female & IBA female heavyweight titles
14	Win	11–3	(Canada) Marsha Valley	UD	6	17 Nov 2005	(United States) Arco Arena, Sacramento, California, USA	
13	Win	10–3	(Canada) Marsha Valley	TKO	4 (6); 1:49	21 Jul 2005	(United States) Arco Arena, Sacramento, California, USA	
12	Win	9–3	(United States) Kathy Rivers	UD	8	2 Apr 2005	(United States) Oakland Arena, Oakland, California, USA	WBE women's Heavyweight Title
11	Win	8–3	(Guyana) Pamela London	TKO	9 (10); 1:19	28 Nov 2004	Splashmins Fun Park & Resort, Georgetown, Guyana	vacant WIBF World heavyweight title
10	Win	7–3	(Canada) Marsha Valley	UD	8	16 Oct 2004	(United States) Oakland Arena, Oakland, California, USA	Vacant WBE Women's Super Heavyweight Title
9	Lose	6–3	(Canada) Marsha Valley	SD	6	18 Mar 2004	(United States) Chumash Casino, Santa Ynez, California, USA	
8	Lose	6–2	(United States) Vonda Ward	UD	10	11 Jul 2003	(United States) Civic Center, Canton, Ohio, USA	IBA female & WIBA World heavyweight titles
7	Win	6–1	(United States) Carley Pesente	TKO	1 (4); 3:00	24 May 2003	(United States) Solano County Fairgrounds, Vallejo, California, USA	
6	Lose	5–1	(United States) Vonda Ward	SD	4	1 Mar 2003	(United States) Thomas & Mack Center, Las Vegas, Nevada, USA	
5	Win	5–0	(United States) Kisha Snow	UD	4	16 Nov 2002	(United States) Mare Island Sports Arena, Vallejo, California, USA	
4	Win	4–0	(United States) Tanisha Dunn	UD	4	20 Oct 2002	(United States) Emerald Queen Casino, Tacoma, Washington, USA	
3	Win	3–0	(United States) Carley Pesente	UD	4	21 Sep 2002	(United States) Emerald Queen Casino, Tacoma, Washington, USA	
2	Win	2–0	(United States) Carley Pesente	UD	4	22 Jun 2002	(United States) Emerald Queen Casino, Tacoma, Washington, USA	
1	Win	1–0	(United States) Denise Callahan	UD	4	25 Mar 2001	(United States) Centennial Hall, Hayward, California, USA	Professional debut

=== Mixed martial arts record ===
Professional record breakdown
1 match	0 wins	1 loss
By submission	0	1

Res.	Record	Opponent	Method	Event	Date	Round	Time	Location	Notes
Lose	0–1	(United States) Lana Stefanac	Submission (Guillotine Choke)	Extreme Wars 3 - Bay Area Brawl	June 3, 2006	1	2:09	Oakland, California, United States	
