= The N's Student Body =

2008 American television series

- Presented by: Laila Ali
- Country of origin: United States
- Original language: English
- No. of seasons: 1
- No. of episodes: 8

Production
- Running time: 43 minutes
- Production companies: Reveille Productions; The N Original

Original release
- Network: The N
- Release: July 11 – August 24, 2008

Related
- Queen Bees

The N's Student Body is an eight-episode competition series that first aired on The N on July 11, 2008. The contestants were twelve students from two high schools in Illinois: MacArthur and Eisenhower. The series was first announced on November 6, 2007.

Tagline: Competition is tough. Change is tougher.

== Overview ==
Host Laila Ali challenges twelve out-of-shape and overweight students from rival high schools to change their bodies, their nutrition, and their attitudes. The winning school takes home $25,000. Whoever loses the most weight wins $25,000 for themselves. The rules changed at the end of the competition, as the grand prize was awarded for "biggest overall transformation". The solo win went to Mike Walker for his overall change in attitude and self-esteem The Team Win was MacArthur.

Every week, the two schools compete in some sort of challenge. The school that wins the challenge gets a reward, such as a yacht ride or being served dinner by the other team. The losing team gets "punishment", like husking corn or cleaning the bleachers after a high school football game. The two trainers for the teen students were Eric Carlson and Sam Upton.

== Weigh-Ins and evaluations ==
After the challenge and reward/punishment, the schools go to the weigh in to find out what their current weight is, therefore evaluating how much weight has been lost that week. Later, the teams go to an evaluation where they are given 1 of 3 different rankings:

Green: the student is making good progress.

Yellow: the student is not making progress (3 yellows equal a Red)

Red: the student isn't invested in the competition and is asked to leave.

== Results ==
Week #	Week 1	Week 2	Week 3	Week 4	Week 5	Week 6	Week 7	Finale
Contestant	Results							
Haylee	Safe	Safe	Safe	Safe	Safe	Safe	Safe	TEAM WIN
Julian	MVP	Safe	Safe	Safe	Warn	Safe	Safe	TEAM WIN
Kevin	Safe	Safe	Safe	Warn	Warn	Safe	Safe	TEAM WIN
Rebecca	Warn	Safe	MVP	Warn	Safe	Safe	Safe	TEAM WIN
Temisan	Safe	Safe	Warn	Safe	Safe	Safe	Safe	TEAM WIN
Wayne**	Safe	Safe	Warn	Warn	Safe	Safe	Safe	TEAM WIN
Andrea	Safe	Safe	Safe	Warn	Safe	Safe	Safe	Safe
Bronson***	Safe	Safe	Safe	Warn	MVP	Safe	Safe	Most Weight Loss
Chaz	Safe	Warn	Safe	Safe	Safe	Safe	Safe	Safe
Jilashli	Safe	Safe	Safe	Safe	Warn	Safe	Warn	Safe
Mike	Safe	Safe	Safe	Safe	Safe	Safe	Safe	SOLO WIN
Josh*	on hiatus		Warn	Safe	Warn	Warn (Elim)		
Tana	Warn	Elim						

The student was from MacArthur.
The student was from Eisenhower
(SOLO WIN) The Student made the biggest overall transformation.
(TEAM WIN) The team won the game.
(MVP) In the event of a tie a student was chosen as an MVP and won for the team.
(Safe) The student got a green card and was improving.
(Warn) The student received a yellow card and a warning.
(Elim) The student was asked to leave because of their lack of being in the game.
The student was not in the competition that week.

* In week 3, Josh joined Eisenhower in the competition to even out the teams.

** In week 7, Wayne's evaluation did not count to even out the teams.

*** In week 8, Bronson won the bet with his mother by losing 74 pounds, reaching a final weight of 206 pounds. Although Bronson lost the most weight and became the most fit, Mike won the grand prize for his change in attitude and self-esteem.
