= Kisha Snow =

American boxer

Personal information
- Nationality: American
- Born: 25 February 1969 (age 57) New york, United States
- Height: 5 ft 7 in (1.70 m)
- Weight: Heavyweight

Boxing career
- Stance: Orthodox

Boxing record
- Total fights: 8
- Wins: 6
- Win by KO: 3
- Losses: 2

Kisha Snow (born February 25, 1969) is a female boxer from the United States.

In 1999, Snow won the amateur women's boxing American Heavyweight title. She has gone on to have a successful career as a professional boxer, fighting and beating some of the top female fighters.

== Professional boxing record ==
8 fights	6 wins	2 losses
By knockout	3	1
By decision	3	1

No.	Result	Record	Opponent	Type	Round, time	Date	Location	Notes
8	Loss	6-2	(United States) Martha Salazar	UD	6	16 Nov 2002	(United States) Mare Island Sports Arena, Vallejo	
7	Loss	6-1	(United States) Vonda Ward	TKO	4 (4), 1:05	2 Feb 2001	(United States) Celeste Center, Columbus	
6	Win	6-0	(United States) Carley Pesente	TKO	1 (?)	14 Jul 2000	(United States) Celeste Center, Columbus	
5	Win	5-0	(United States) Jeanine Tracy	DQ	1 (4)	17 May 2000	(United States) Hammerstein Ballroom, New York	
4	Win	4-0	(United States) Bridgett Robinson	TKO	1 (4)	27 Jan 2000	(United States) Hammerstein Ballroom, New York	
3	Win	3-0	(United States) Karen Bill	TKO	3 (4), 0:27	2 Sep 1999	(United States) Gold Strike Tunica	
2	Win	2-0	(United States) Tiffany Logan	MD	4	3 Jun 1999	(United States) Soaring Eagle Casino, Mount Pleasant	
1	Win	1-0	(United States) Mary Barnes	UD	4	8 Dec 1998	(United States) Roseland Ballroom, New York	
