= Ann Wolfe =

American professional boxer

Personal information
- Nickname: Brown Sugar
- Born: January 17, 1971 (age 55) Austin, Texas, U.S.
- Height: 5 ft 10 in (178 cm)
- Weight: Light middleweight; Middleweight; Super middleweight; Light heavyweight

Boxing career
- Reach: 72 in (183 cm)
- Stance: Orthodox

Boxing record
- Total fights: 26
- Wins: 24
- Win by KO: 16
- Losses: 1
- No contests: 1

Ann Wolfe (born January 17, 1971) is an American retired professional boxer, trainer and actress. Wolfe held world titles in three different weight classes simultaneously and is regarded as one of the greatest female boxers of all time. She is a member of the International Women's Boxing Hall of Fame.

== Personal life ==
Wolfe was born in Oberlin, Louisiana and moved to Austin, Texas where she spent most of her childhood. She moved back to Austin in 1996 with her two daughters and one son. After being homeless and working construction, she met her original trainer 'Pops' Billingsley. She fought her amateur fights under Billingsley's tutelage and started fighting as a professional for RPM Promotions.

== Amateur career ==
Wolfe had a record of 3–1 as an amateur boxer and fought at the 1998 U.S. National Championships. She won a decision over Tami Hendrickson of Seattle in the quarter-final by 50–39, then went on to stop Shanie Keelean of Chicago within 46 seconds of the first round. In the semifinal Wolfe lost to La'Kiea Coffen by a disqualification at 1:23 of the third round.

== Professional career ==
Wolfe made her professional debut by beating Brenda Lee Bell by a four-round decision. Her first and only career loss came four fights later, when she was knocked out in three rounds by veteran and future world champion Valerie Mahfood.

Wolfe beat Vienna Williams by a ten-round decision to win her first world title, the IFBA Jr. Middleweight title. She beat Gina Nicholas by knockout in three to win the vacant WIBA Light Middleweight title. She then proceeded to beat Shirvelle Williams by knockout in one round on a non-title bout.

Next was the vacant IFBA world Super Middleweight title, which she picked up by knocking out Marsha Valley in six rounds. She and Valley fought again, this time with the vacant WIBC's version of the title, and Wolfe won by knockout in round ten.

Wolfe avenged her defeat against Mahfood by taking the NABA World Super Middleweight Championship from her with a ten-round decision.

=== Wolfe vs. Ward ===
On May 8, 2004, in Biloxi, Mississippi, Wolfe matched Henry Armstrong's record of three world titles at the same time in different weight classes, by gaining the IBA world Light Heavyweight championship, knocking out undefeated champion and former NCAA basketball star Vonda Ward at one minute and eight seconds of Round One. Ward had a neck concussion because she hit the canvas with her neck when she fell. She was taken to the hospital in serious condition due to damage to her neck and head. The bout was nationally televised, with television commentators called it "the best knockout punch in a women's boxing history".

=== Later career ===
Wolfe retained her title in a rematch with Valley by a sixth-round knockout.

On July 19, 2005, Wolfe defeated Monica Nunez by a seventh-round knockout in Lula, Mississippi.

On August 20, 2005, she fought and defeated Valerie Mahfood for the second time, by a ten-round decision.

=== Retirement ===
Wolfe last fought in 2006, knocking out Cassandra Giger and decisioning Lisa Ested. She has since worked as a boxing trainer.

In 2015, Wolfe was inducted into the International Women's Boxing Hall of Fame.

== Training career ==
Wolfe has trained many amateur and professional boxers, including her oldest daughter, Jennifer Fenn, and light-middleweight James Kirkland.

== Film career ==
Wolfe was cast by director Patty Jenkins in the role of Amazon warrior Artemis in the 2017 film Wonder Woman.

== Professional boxing record ==
26 fights	24 wins	1 loss
By knockout	16	1
By decision	8	0
No contests	1	

No.	Result	Record	Opponent	Type	Round, time	Date	Location	Notes
26	Win	24–1 (1)	Lisa Ested	UD	6	Jun 4, 2006	FedEx Forum, Memphis, Tennessee, U.S.	
25	Win	23–1 (1)	Cassandra Giger	KO	2 (4), 0:53	Apr 29, 2006	Coushatta Casino Resort, Kinder, Louisiana, U.S.	
24	Win	22–1 (1)	Valerie Mahfood	UD	10	Aug 20, 2005	Mississippi Coast Coliseum, Biloxi, Mississippi, U.S.	Retained WIBA and IBA female light heavyweight titles
23	Win	21–1 (1)	Mónica Núñez	TKO	7 (8), 3:00	Jul 19, 2005	Isle of Capri Hotel & Casino, Lula, Mississippi, U.S.	
22	Win	20–1 (1)	Marsha Valley	TKO	6 (10), 1:17	Jun 18, 2005	FedEx Forum, Memphis, Tennessee, U.S.	Retained IBA female light heavyweight title
21	Win	19–1 (1)	Genevia Buckhalter	TKO	1 (6), 1:09	Mar 5, 2005	Isle of Capri Casino, Biloxi, Mississippi, U.S.	
20	Win	18–1 (1)	Cassandra Giger	UD	6	Nov 5, 2004	Fitzgerald's Casino & Hotel, Tunica, Mississippi, U.S.	
19	Win	17–1 (1)	Vonda Ward	KO	1 (10), 1:08	May 8, 2004	Mississippi Coast Coliseum, Biloxi, Mississippi, U.S.	Won WIBA and vacant IBA female light heavyweight titles
18	Win	16–1 (1)	Deborah Fettkether	UD	8	Oct 11, 2003	Grand Casino Coushatta, Kinder, Louisiana, U.S.	
17	Win	15–1 (1)	Valerie Mahfood	UD	10	Aug 23, 2003	Mississippi Coast Coliseum, Biloxi, Mississippi, U.S.	Won vacant WBA-NABA super middleweight title
16	Win	14–1 (1)	Marsha Valley	TKO	10 (10), 0:48	Dec 21, 2002	Memorial Auditorium, Fort Lauderdale, Florida, U.S.	Won vacant WIBC super middleweight title
15	Win	13–1 (1)	Genevia Buckhalter	TKO	2 (4), 0:39	Sep 25, 2002	Radisson Hotel, Houston, Texas, U.S.	
14	Win	12–1 (1)	Marsha Valley	TKO	6 (10), 1:06	Jun 21, 2002	Convention Center, Waco, Texas, U.S.	Won vacant IFBA super middleweight title
13	Win	11–1 (1)	Shirvelle Williams	TKO	1 (4), 1:40	Apr 25, 2002	Civic Center, Laredo, Texas, U.S.	
12	Win	10–1 (1)	Gina Nicholas	TKO	3 (10), 0:47	Nov 16, 2001	Convention Center, Austin, Texas, U.S.	Retained IFBA light middleweight title; Won WIBA light middleweight title
11	Win	9–1 (1)	Diane Clarke	RTD	4 (6), 2:00	Jul 14, 2001	Pepsi Center, Denver, Colorado, U.S.	
10	Win	8–1 (1)	Vienna Williams	UD	10	May 15, 2001	Convention Center, Honolulu, Hawaii, U.S.	Won vacant IFBA light middleweight title
9	Win	7–1 (1)	Patricia Linton	TKO	1 (6), 0:36	Apr 19, 2001	Radisson Hotel, Houston, Texas, U.S.	
8	Win	6–1 (1)	Kelly Whaley	TKO	5 (6), 1:19	Feb 2, 2001	Hilton Hotel, Reno, Nevada, U.S.	
7	Loss	5–1 (1)	Valerie Mahfood	TKO	3 (6), 1:17	Nov 30, 2000	Radisson Hotel, Houston, Texas, U.S.	
6	NC	5–0 (1)	Christine Robinson	NC	1 (6)	May 24, 2000	Kenner, Louisiana, U.S.	Fight stopped after Robinson was cut from an accidental head clash
5	Win	5–0	Gina Nicholas	KO	2 (6), 0:17	Apr 26, 2000	New Orleans, Louisiana, U.S.	
4	Win	4–0	Mary Ann Almager	TKO	1 (6), 0:41	Feb 11, 2000	Kenner, Louisiana, U.S.	
3	Win	3–0	Demetra Jones	TKO	1 (4)	Jan 20, 2000	Radisson Hotel, Houston, Texas, U.S.	
2	Win	2–0	Dakota Stone	UD	4	Oct 9, 1999	Mercer Arena, Seattle, Washington, U.S.	
1	Win	1–0	Brenda Drexel	SD	4	Oct 17, 1998	Seven Feathers Hotel & Casino Resort, Canyonville, Oregon, U.S.	

== See also ==
- List of boxing quadruple champions
- List of boxing triple champions
- List of light middleweight boxing champions
- List of middleweight boxing champions
- List of super middleweight boxing champions
- List of light heavyweight boxing champions

Preceded by Inaugural Champion	WIBA Light Middleweight Champion; 16 November 2001–1 March 2002; Vacated	Succeeded by Mary Jo Sanders
Preceded by Trina Ortegon	IFBA Middleweight Champion; 21 February 2002–21 December 2002; Vacated	Succeeded by Vacated
Preceded by Jacqui Frazier-Lyde	WIBA Light Heavyweight Champion; 8 May 2004–29 May 2004; Vacated	Succeeded by Gwendolyn O'Neil
