= Carlette Ewell =

American boxer (born 1971)

- Born: Carlette Virginia Ewell; August 20, 1971 (age 55); Winston-Salem, North Carolina, United States
- Other names: The Truth
- Height: 173 cm (5 ft 8 in)
- Weight: 224.75 lb (102 kg; 16 st 1 lb)
- Division: Heavyweight
- Style: Boxing
- Years active: 2002 - 2008, 2010 - 2012, 2015, 2017

Professional boxing record
- Total: 27
- Wins: 16
- By knockout: 9
- Losses: 10
- By knockout: 4
- Draws: 1

Other information
- Boxing record from BoxRec
- Last updated on: 2 April 2017

Carlette Ewell (born 20 August 1971, Winston-Salem, North Carolina, United States) is an American former professional boxer.

Ewell won five professional boxing titles in her career, including the WIBA World light heavyweight title against Gwendolyn O'Neil. The biggest fight of her career was against Alejandra Jimenez for the WBC World female heavyweight title in Mexico. Ewell lost the bout in the first round by technical knockout with the occurrence of a crushed right ankle Fibula bone per her fall before being grazed with a punch. She was inducted into the International Women's Boxing Hall of Fame in 2025.

== Professional Boxing Titles ==
- WBE female light heavyweight title (180½ Ibs)
- Universal Boxing Council
  - UBC America's female cruiserweight title (188½ Ibs)
- Women's International Boxing Council
  - WIBC light heavyweight title (174 Ibs)
- Women's International Boxing Association
  - WIBA World light heavyweight title (174 Ibs)
- UNBC female heavyweight title (215 Ibs)

== Boxing Record ==
27 fights	17 wins	9 losses
By knockout	9	4
By decision	8	5
Draws	1	

No.	Result	Record	Opponent	Type	Round, time	Date	Location	Notes
26	Lose	16–10–1	(Canada) Claire Hafner	UD	8	15 Jun 2019	(United States) Benton Convention Center, Winston-Salem, North Carolina, USA	
26	Lose	16–9–1	(Mexico) Alejandra Jimenez	TKO	1 (10); 0:57	1 Apr 2017	Zócalo, Mexico City, Distrito Federal, Mexico	WBC World female heavyweight title
25	Win	16–8–1	(United States) Laura Ramsey	UD	10	23 May 2015	(United States) Southside Recreation Center, High Point, North Carolina, USA	
24	Lose	15–8–1	(Greece) Sonya Lamonakis	SD	10	6 Dec 2014	L.B. Scott Sports Auditorium, Philipsburg, Sint Maarten	vacant IBO World female heavyweight title
23	Draw	15–7–1	(Greece) Sonya Lamonakis	SD	6	21 Jan 2012	(United States) Roseland Ballroom, New York, New York, USA	
22	Win	15–7	(United States) Tiffany Woodard	UD	10	1 Oct 2011	(United States) Coliseum, Greensboro, North Carolina, USA	
21	Win	14–7	(United States) Tiffany Woodard	UD	8	18 Jun 2010	(United States) Benton Convention Center, Winston-Salem, North Carolina, USA	vacant UNBC female heavyweight title
20	Win	13–7	(Guyana) Gwendolyn O'Neil	UD	10	1 Nov 2008	Sint Maarten	WIBC & WIBA World light heavyweight title
19	Lose	12–7	(Guyana) Gwendolyn O'Neil	SD	10	6 Jun 2008	Sint Maarten	vacant WIBA World light heavyweight title
18	Lose	12–6	(United States) Vonda Ward	UD	10	23 Feb 2008	(United States) Chapparells Community Center, Akron, Ohio, USA	
17	Win	12–5	(United States) Kelly Young	RTD	1 (6); 3:00	23 Jun 2007	(United States) Lawrence Joel Veterans Memorial Coliseum, Winston-Salem, North Carolina, USA	
16	Win	11–5	(United States) Alexandra Maloy	UD	8	14 Apr 2007	(United States) Lawrence Joel Veterans Memorial Coliseum, Winston-Salem, North Carolina, USA	UBC America's female cruiserweight title
15	Lose	10–5	(Kazakhstan) Natascha Ragosina	TKO	5 (10); 1:23	15 Apr 2006	Maritim Hotel, Magdeburg, Sachsen-Anhalt, Germany	WIBF World & vacant GBU Female World super middleweight titles
14	Lose	10–4	(United States) Ijeoma Egbunine	TKO	2 (10); 1:15	5 Nov 2005	(United States) Lawrence Joel Veterans Memorial Coliseum, Winston-Salem, North Carolina, USA	WBE female light heavyweight & WBE female super middleweight titles
13	Win	10–3	(United States) Tristen Jones	TKO	1 (4); 0:37	13 Aug 2005	(United States) Lawrence Joel Veterans Memorial Coliseum, Winston-Salem, North Carolina, USA	
12	Win	9–3	(United States) Ramona Crim	TKO	4 (8); 0:22	16 Apr 2005	(United States) M.C. Benton Jr. Convention Center, Winston-Salem, North Carolina, USA	WBE female light heavyweight title
11	Win	8–3	(United States) Leanna Owens	UD	4	15 Jan 2005	(United States) M.C. Benton Jr. Convention Center, Winston-Salem, North Carolina, USA	
10	Win	7–3	(United States) Ramona Crim	TKO	4 (4); 0:39	16 Oct 2004	(United States) M.C. Benton Jr. Convention Center, Winston-Salem, North Carolina, USA	
9	Lose	6–3	(United States) Valerie Mahfood	UD	10	28 Aug 2004	(United States) Grand Casino Coushatta, Kinder, Louisiana, USA	IBA continental female light heavyweight title
8	Win	6–2	(United States) Gwen Wood	TKO	2 (4); 3:00	5 Jun 2004	(United States) Events Center, Greensboro, North Carolina, USA	
7	Lose	5–2	(United States) Valerie Mahfood	SD	8	20 Feb 2004	(United States) Civic Center, Beaumont, Texas, USA	Vacant Texas State Light Heavyeight Title
6	Win	5–1	(United States) Ebony Teague	TKO	1 (4); 1:39	19 Aug 2003	(United States) Trap Nightclub, Nashville, Tennessee, USA	
5	Win	4–1	(United States) Kathy Goins	TKO	1 (4); 1:55	9 Aug 2003	(United States) Lawrence Joel Veterans Memorial Coliseum, Winston-Salem, North Carolina, USA	
4	Win	3–1	(United States) Kimberly Massey	TKO	3 (4)	18 Jan 2003	(United States) Joel Coliseum, Winston-Salem, North Carolina, USA	
3	Lose	2–1	(United States) Nikki Eplion	KO	2 (4)	18 Jan 2003	(United States) Huntington, West Virginia, USA	
2	Win	2–0	(United States) Xinthia Nevels Jones	UD	4	20 Jul 2002	(United States) Joel Coliseum, Winston-Salem, North Carolina, USA	
1	Win	1–0	(United States) Denise Grant	TKO	2 (4)	20 Apr 2002	(United States) Greensboro, North Carolina, USA	Professional debut
