= CedarBridge Academy =

Cedarbridge Academy

Location
- 1 Cedarbridge Lane; Devonshire Parish; Bermuda
- 32.3026°N 64.7672°W

Information
- School type: Senior School
- Website: www.moed.bm/CBA/

CedarBridge Academy is a senior high school in Devonshire Parish, Bermuda. It is one of Bermuda's two public senior schools, having opened in 1997. It was constructed within the former military base Prospect Camp in the 1990s in place of the old army barracks that had previously housed Prospect Secondary School on the same site, as the result of the decision of the Government of Bermuda to split the Secondary School level of education into middle school and senior High school levels, in emulation of the United States school system, with all of the former public and aided secondary schools converted into middle schools, with a single senior high school: CedarBridge Academy. This plan was deeply unpopular, but the government pressed ahead with it. As a result, the aided secondary school Warwick Academy exited the public education system, reverting to being a private school, and many parents who had been satisfied with the public school system beforehand transferred their children to one of the four private schools (Warwick Academy, Saltus Grammar School, the Bermuda High School for Girls, Mount St. Agnes Academy and Montessori Academy) or sending them to private schools abroad, leading to 40% of Bermuda's children attending private schools and the perception that only those parents who cannot afford private schools send their children to public schools. The government did amend its plans by retaining secondary school Berkeley Institute as a senior high school, supplementary to CedarBridge Academy.

The CedarBridge Academy Gymnasium serves as the Emergency Measures Organization's official pre-hurricane shelter, typically opening before the arrival of severe storms.
