= Skye Nicolson =

Australian boxer (born 1995)

Personal information
- Born: Skye Brittany Nicolson; 27 August 1995 (age 31) Meadowbrook, Queensland, Australia
- Height: 5 ft 5 1/2 in (166 cm)
- Weight: Featherweight, Super-bantamweight

Boxing career
- Reach: 68 1/2 in (174 cm)
- Stance: Southpaw

Boxing record
- Total fights: 18
- Wins: 17
- Win by KO: 3
- Losses: 1
Medal record
Women's Boxing
Representing Australia
World Championships
Bronze medal – third place	2016 Astana	Light welterweight
Commonwealth Games
Gold medal – first place	2018 Gold Coast	Featherweight

Skye Brittany Nicolson (born 27 August 1995) is an Australian professional boxer. She is a two-weight world champion having held the WBC female super-bantamweight title since May 2026 and previously been WBC female featherweight champion from April 2024 to March 2025. As an amateur, Nicolson won the gold medal in the featherweight event at the 2018 Commonwealth Games and represented Australia at the delayed 2020 Tokyo Olympics.

== Early life ==
Nicolson was born at Logan Hospital in Meadowbrook, Queensland. Her father is Scottish-born Allan, originally from Glasgow, and her mother is English-born Pat from London. Nicolson grew up on the Gold Coast and attended Our Lady's College. She started boxing training at 12 years of age in the Gold Coast suburb of Yatala at the Jamie Nicolson Memorial Gym, which is named after her late brother. Notable students she grew up training alongside in the same Yatala gym include future world champions Cherneka Johnson and Che Kenneally. Her brothers, Jamie and Gavin, were killed in a car crash a year before she was born. Jamie competed at the 1992 Olympic Games and won a bronze medal at the 1990 Commonwealth Games.

== Amateur career ==
In 2016, Nicolson won bronze at the World Championships in the Welterweight division. She missed out on the Rio 2016 Olympics and moved down 4 weight classes to the featherweight division. She then competed at the 2018 Gold Coast Commonwealth Games and won gold. Nicolson defeated Michaela Walsh from Northern Ireland in the final bout in a split decision.

The Queensland athlete claimed her spot on the Tokyo 2020 Australian Olympic Team at the 2020 Asia and Oceana Qualification event held in Amman, Jordan after defeating Mongolia's Bolortuul Tumurkhuyag.

Nicolson reached the quarter-final of the delayed 2020 Tokyo Olympics, before suffering a 3–2 defeat to Great Britain’s Karriss Artingstall. She retired from amateur competition with a record of 107–32.

== Professional career ==
Nicolson made her professional debut on 3 March 2022, at the Pechanga Resort & Casino in San Diego, US, against the American fighter Jessica Juarez. Nicolson won by unanimous decision.

On 15 October 2022, Nicolson defeated Krystina Jacobs by unanimous decision to win her first professional belt, inaugural Commonwealth female featherweight championship in Brisbane, Australia. The outing was her first pro-fight on home soil.

On 4 February 2023, Nicolson defeated Tania Alvarez by unanimous decision to win WBC female Silver featherweight championship at the Hulu Theater in New York, US.

On 15 September 2023, Nicolson challenged Sabrina Maribel Perez for the interim WBC featherweight championship at Auditorio Fausto Gutierrez Moreno in Tijuana, Mexico. She won the fight by unanimous decision.

On 25 November 2023 at 3Arena in Dublin, Ireland, Nicolson retained her interim WBC featherweight championship via ninth-round technical knockout against Lucy Wildheart.

=== WBC women's featherweight champion ===
==== Nicolson vs. Mahfoud ====
In January 2024, it was announced that Nicolson would face Sarah Mahfoud for the vacant WBC female featherweight title in Australia. Early March 2024, the fight was scheduled for 6 April 2024 at Fontainebleau Las Vegas in Winchester, Nevada, USA Nicolson defeated Mahfoud via unanimous decision (100-90, 100-90, 99-91) and took the vacant title.

==== Nicolson vs. Vargas ====
Nicolson made the first defence of her WBC featherweight title against Dyana Vargas at Wells Fargo Center in Philadelphia, Pennsylvania, US on 13 July 2024, winning the fight by unanimous decision with all three ringside judges scoring the contest 100-90.

==== Nicolson vs. Chapman ====
Nicolson made the second defence of her title against the previously unbeaten Raven Chapman at Kingdom Arena in Riyadh, Saudi Arabia, on 12 October 2024, in what was the first women's world title boxing fight held in the country and the first women’s bout to feature on a Riyadh Season show. She won the fight by unanimous decision, with scorecards of 98-92 and 99-91.

==== Nicolson vs. Brown ====
Nicolson made the third defence of her WBC featherweight title against Tiara Brown at Qudos Bank Arena in Sydney, Australia on 22 March 2025. She lost by split decision.

=== Super-bantamweight ===
Dropping down to campaign at super-bantamweight, Nicolson returned to the ring against Carla Camila Campos Gonzales at Manchester Arena, Manchester, England, on 5 July 2025, stopping her opponent in the second of their scheduled eight-round contest.

On 23 August 2025, she stopped Urvashi Singh in the second round at Fortitude Music Hall in Fortitude Valley, Queensland, Australia, to win the vacant IBF Intercontinental female super-bantamweight title.

=== Interim WBC super bantamweight champion ===
==== Nicolson vs. Luna ====
Nicolson beat Yulihan Luna by unanimous decision at Adventist Health Arena in Stockton, California, USA, on 13 December 2025, to win the interim WBC female super-bantamweight.

==== Nicolson vs. Turner ====
Nicolson successfully defended her interim WBC super-bantamweight title by unanimous decision against Mariah Turner at The Melbourne Pavilion in Flemington, Victoria, Australia on 29 April 2026.

=== Two-weight world champion ===
On 27 May 2026, Nicolson became a two-weight world champion when she was elevated to full WBC female super-bantamweight title holder after Ellie Scotney vacated the championship.

She made the first defense of her title against Miyo Yoshida at College Park Center in Arlington, Texas, United States, on 8 November 2026. Nicolson won via unanimous decision.

== Professional boxing record ==
18 fights	17 wins	1 loss
By knockout	3	0
By decision	14	1

No.	Result	Record	Opponent	Type	Round, time	Date	Location	Notes
18	Win	17–1	Miyo Yoshida	UD	10	8 Nov 2026	College Park Center, Arlington, Texas, U.S.	Retained WBC female super-bantamweight title
17	Win	16–1	Mariah Turner	UD	10	29 Apr 2026	The Melbourne Pavilion, Flemington, Victoria, Australia	Retained WBC interim female super-bantamweight title
16	Win	15–1	Yulihan Luna	UD	10	13 Dec 2025	Adventist Health Arena, Stockton, California, US	Won vacant WBC interim female super-bantamweight title
15	Win	14–1	Urvashi Singh	TKO	2 (10), 1:23	23 Aug 2025	Fortitude Music Hall, Fortitude Valley, Australia	Won vacant IBF Intercontinental female super-bantamweight title
14	Win	13–1	Carla Camila Campos Gonzales	TKO	2 (8), 1:21	5 Jul 2025	Manchester Arena, Manchester, England	
13	Loss	12–1	Tiara Brown	SD	10	22 Mar 2025	Qudos Bank Arena, Sydney Olympic Park, Australia	Lost WBC female featherweight title
12	Win	12–0	Raven Chapman	UD	10	12 Oct 2024	Kingdom Arena, Riyadh, Saudi Arabia	Retained WBC female featherweight title
11	Win	11–0	Dyana Vargas	UD	10	13 Jul 2024	Wells Fargo Center, Philadelphia, Pennsylvania, US	Retained WBC female featherweight title
10	Win	10–0	Sarah Mahfoud	UD	10	6 Apr 2024	Fontainebleau Las Vegas, Winchester, Nevada, US	Won vacant WBC female featherweight title
9	Win	9–0	Lucy Wildheart	TKO	9 (10), 1:11	25 Nov 2023	3Arena, Dublin, Ireland	Retained WBC interim featherweight title
8	Win	8–0	Sabrina Maribel Pérez	UD	10	15 Sep 2023	Auditorio Fausto Gutierrez Moreno, Tijuana, Mexico	Won WBC interim featherweight title
7	Win	7–0	Linda Laura Lecca	PTS	8	22 Apr 2023	Motorpoint Arena, Cardiff, Wales	
6	Win	6–0	Tania Alvarez	UD	10	4 Feb 2023	Hulu Theater, New York City, New York, US	Won vacant WBC Silver featherweight title
5	Win	5–0	Krystina Jacobs	UD	10	15 Oct 2022	South Bank Piazza, South Brisbane, Queensland, Australia	Won inaugural Commonwealth female featherweight title
4	Win	4–0	Gabriela Bouvier	PTS	8	4 Jun 2022	Motorpoint Arena, Cardiff, Wales	
3	Win	3–0	Shanecqua Paisley Davis	UD	6	30 Apr 2022	Madison Square Garden, New York City, New York, US	
2	Win	2–0	Bec Connolly	PTS	6	26 Mar 2022	First Direct Arena, Leeds, England	
1	Win	1–0	Jessica Juarez	UD	6	3 Mar 2022	Pechanga Arena, San Diego, California, US	

== See also ==
- List of female boxers
- List of southpaw stance boxers

Sporting positions
Regional boxing titles
New title	Commonwealth female featherweight title October 15, 2022 – September 15, 2023; Won interim title	Vacant
Vacant Title last held by Erika Cruz	WBC Silver female featherweight champion February 4, 2023 – September 15, 2023; Won interim title	Vacant Title next held by Sarah Mahfoud
World boxing titles
Preceded by Sabrina Maribel Pérez	WBC female featherweight champion Interim title September 15, 2023 – April 7, 2024; Won full title	Vacant
Vacant Title last held by Amanda Serrano	WBC female featherweight champion April 7, 2024 – March 22, 2025	Succeeded by Tiara Brown
Vacant Title last held by Ellie Scotney	WBC female super-bantamweight champion May 27, 2026 – present	Incumbent
