= Susie Ramadan =

Australian boxer (born 1979)

Personal information
- Nickname: Susie Q
- Nationality: Australian
- Born: Sunduz Ramadan; 10 April 1979 (age 47)
- Height: 5 ft 3 in (160 cm)
- Weight: Bantamweight; Super-bantamweight

Boxing career
- Stance: Orthodox

Boxing record
- Total fights: 31
- Wins: 28
- Win by KO: 12
- Losses: 3

Sunduz "Susie" Ramadan (born 10 April 1979) is an Australian professional boxer. She held the IBF female bantamweight title in 2011 and the WBC female bantamweight title from 2012 to 2014.

== Biography ==
Ramadan was raised in the Western suburbs of Melbourne with her sister, Julia. She is Muslim and comes from an Albanian and Turkish background.

== Professional boxing record ==
31 fights	28 wins	3 losses
By knockout	12	0
By decision	16	3

No.	Result	Record	Opponent	Type	Round, time	Date	Location	Notes
33	Loss	29–4	(Australia) Cherneka Johnson	UD	10	15 Oct 2022	Rod Laver Arena, Melbourne, Australia	For IBF female super bantamweight title
32	Win	29–3	(Japan) Tomoko Okuda	UD	8	20 Aug 2022	The Melbourne Pavilion, Flemington, Australia	
31	Win	28–3	(Philippines) Gretel de Paz	UD	8	15 Feb 2020	Grand Star Reception and Convention Centre, Melbourne, Australia	Won vacant IBA female super-flyweight title
30	Loss	27–3	(Mexico) Mariana Juárez	UD	10	27 Oct 2018	Auditorio Miguel Barragan, San Luis Potosi, Mexico	For WBC female bantamweight title
29	Win	27–2	(Thailand) Sumalee Tongpootorn	TKO	2 (6), 1:55	13 Oct 2017	The Melbourne Pavilion, Flemington, Australia	
28	Win	26–2	(Thailand) Rungnapa Keawkrachang	TKO	3 (6), 1:51	3 Mar 2017	The Melbourne Pavilion, Flemington, Australia	
27	Win	25–2	(Thailand) Khwunchit Khunya	TKO	6 (6), 1:52	19 Nov 2016	The Melbourne Pavilion, Flemington, Australia	
26	Win	24–2	(Thailand) Vacharaporn Prachumchai	TKO	3 (8), 1:59	9 Apr 2016	Warrnambool Stadium, Warrnambool, Australia	
25	Loss	23–2	(Mexico) Yazmín Rivas	UD	10	14 Oct 2014	Auditorio Centenario, Gómez Palacio, Mexico	For WBC female bantamweight title
24	Win	23–1	(Thailand) Usanakorn Kokietgym	UD	10	13 Jul 2012	The Melbourne Pavilion, Flemington, Australia	Won WBC female bantamweight title
23	Win	22–1	(Germany) Alesia Graf	SD	10	24 Feb 2012	The Melbourne Pavilion, Flemington, Australia	Won vacant WBC International female bantamweight title
22	Loss	21–1	(Mexico) Yazmín Rivas	SD	10	15 Oct 2011	Centro Internacional de Convenciones, Chetumal, Mexico	For vacant IBF female bantamweight title
21	Win	21–0	(Australia) Sara George	UD	10	1 May 2011	Reggio Calabria Club, Melbourne, Australia	
20	Win	20–0	(United States) Terri Lynn Cruz	UD	10	20 Feb 2011	Reggio Calabria Club, Melbourne, Australia	Won vacant IBF female bantamweight title
19	Win	19–0	(New Zealand) Michelle Preston	UD	6	8 Dec 2010	Acer Arena, Sydney, Australia	
18	Win	18–0	(Ghana) Yarkor Chavez Annan	TKO	3 (8), 1:40	21 Nov 2010	Reggio Calabria Club, Melbourne, Australia	
17	Win	17–0	(Thailand) Satreelek Paradorn Gym	KO	2 (8), 0:58	1 Oct 2010	Town Hall, Melbourne, Australia	
16	Win	16–0	(Thailand) Chuthaporn Pradissan	UD	8	13 Aug 2010	Reggio Calabria Club, Melbourne, Australia	
15	Win	15–0	(Kenya) Jane Kavulani	UD	10	9 Jul 2010	Reggio Calabria Club, Melbourne, Australia	Won vacant WBF female bantamweight title
14	Win	14–0	(Thailand) Snamark Naterugsa	TKO	4 (8), 0:42	14 May 2010	Knox Netball Centre, Melbourne, Australia	
13	Win	13–0	(Paraguay) Maria Jose Nunez	UD	8	19 Mar 2010	Knox Netball Centre, Melbourne, Australia	
12	Win	12–0	(Thailand) Jubjang Lookmakarmwan	TKO	9 (10), 1:44	27 Nov 2009	Knox Netball Centre, Melbourne, Australia	Won vacant WBF female super-bantamweight title
11	Win	11–0	(Australia) Leighann Banham	UD	8	11 Oct 2009	Reggio Calabria Club, Melbourne, Australia	
10	Win	10–0	(New Zealand) Christina Tai	UD	8	21 Aug 2009	Knox Netball Centre, Melbourne, Australia	
9	Win	9–0	(Australia) Leighann Banham	UD	8	22 May 2009	Knox Netball Centre, Melbourne, Australia	
8	Win	8–0	(New Zealand) Michelle Preston	UD	10	20 Mar 2009	Knox Netball Centre, Melbourne, Australia	Retained OPBF female super-bantamweight title
7	Win	7–0	(New Zealand) Michelle Preston	UD	10	28 Nov 2008	Knox Netball Centre, Melbourne, Australia	Won vacant OPBF female super-bantamweight title
6	Win	6–0	(Thailand) Kwanpirom Muangroi-ed	TKO	1 (6), 1:58	17 Oct 2008	Reggio Calabria Club, Melbourne, Australia	
5	Win	5–0	(Thailand) Satreelek Paradorn Gym	TKO	4 (8), 1:08	22 Aug 2008	Knox Netball Centre, Melbourne, Australia	
4	Win	4–0	(Australia) Edith Smith	UD	8	11 Jul 2008	Knox Netball Centre, Melbourne, Australia	Won vacant Australian female super-bantamweight title
3	Win	3–0	(Thailand) Nongbow Lookhauybong	TKO	4 (6), 1:30	2 May 2008	Knox Netball Centre, Melbourne, Australia	
2	Win	2–0	(Thailand) Nong Tak Sakrungruang	TKO	3 (4), 1:07	29 Feb 2008	Knox Netball Centre, Melbourne, Australia	
1	Win	1–0	(Thailand) Chuthaporn Pradissan	UD	4	7 Dec 2007	Knox Netball Centre, Melbourne, Australia	
