= Mayelli Flores =

Mexican boxer (born 1992)

Personal information
- Born: Mayelli Flores Rosquero; 27 May 1992 (age 34) Mexico
- Height: 4 ft 11 in (150 cm)
- Weight: Bantamweight; Super bantamweight

Boxing career
- Stance: Orthodox

Boxing record
- Total fights: 17
- Wins: 13
- Win by KO: 4
- Losses: 3
- Draws: 1

Mayelli Flores Rosquero (born May 27, 1992) is a Mexican professional boxer. She held the WBA female super-bantamweight title from May 2025 to April 2026.

== Professional career ==
Flores turned professional in 2014 and compiled a record of 8–0–1 before facing Yulihan Luna for the WBC female bantamweight title at Gimnasio Miguel Hidalgo in Puebla, Mexico, on 2 April 2022, losing via unanimous decision.

She would get a second opportunity at a world championship three years later, beating Nazarena Romero by split decision to win the WBA female super-bantamweight title at Silver Spurs Arena in Kissimmee, Florida, USA, on 10 May 2025.

Holding the WBA super bantamweight title, Flores was scheduled to face unified IBF, WBC, and WBO champion Ellie Scotney for the undisputed title on 14 November 2025, in Miami, Florida, on the undercard of Jake Paul vs. Gervonta Davis. However, the fight was cancelled when Scotney suffered an injury during training camp. On 4 February 2026, it was announced that the bout had been rearranged to take place at Olympia London in England on 5 April 2026. Flores lost by unanimous decision.

Flores faced Melissa Mortensen for the vacant WBA female super-bantamweight title at the Pechanga Resort Casino on 21 August 2026. After 10 rounds, she lost the bout by split decision with the scorecards reading 95–94, 94–95, 94–95. Following the fight, it was revealed that Flores had suffered a broken jaw in the fourth round.

== Professional boxing record ==
17 fights	13 wins	3 losses
By knockout	4	0
By decision	9	3
Draws	1	

No.	Result	Record	Opponent	Type	Round, time	Date	Location	Notes
17	Loss	13–3–1	Melissa Mortensen	SD	10	21 Aug 2026	Pechanga Resort Casino, Temecula, California, U.S.	For WBA female super-bantamweight title
16	Loss	13–2–1	Ellie Scotney	UD	10	Apr 5, 2026	Olympia, London, England	Lost WBA female super-bantamweight title; For WBC, IBF, WBO & The Ring female super-bantamweight titles
15	Win	13–1–1	Nazarena Romero	SD	10	Oct 5, 2025	Silver Spurs Arena, Kissimmee, Florida, U.S.	Won WBA female super-bantamweight title
14	Win	12–1–1	Maricruz Gomez Soto	TKO	5 (8)	Nov 30, 2024	Morelos, Mexico	
13	Win	11–1–1	Alexia Dimas Duenas	UD	8	Oct 5, 2024	Pachuca, Mexico	
12	Win	10–1–1	Mariana Juárez	UD	8	Jun 10, 2023	Toyota Arena, Ontario, California, U.S.	
11	Win	9–1–1	Guadalupe Martínez Guzmán	MD	6	Sep 23, 2022	Grand Oasis Arena, Cancún, Mexico	
10	Loss	8–1–1	Yulihan Luna	UD	10	Apr 2, 2022	Gimnasio Miguel Hidalgo, Puebla, Mexico	For WBC female bantamweight title
9	Win	8–0–1	Susy Kandy Sandoval	TKO	4 (8)	Oct 4, 2019	Domo Sindicato de Trabajadores IMSS, Tlalpan, Mexico	
8	Win	7–0–1	Zulina Muñoz	KO	5 (10)	Apr 27, 2019	La Feria de San Marcos, Aguascalientes, Mexico	
7	Win	6–0–1	Jessica Martinez Castillo	SD	6	Jun 17, 2016	Deportivo Leandro Valle, Mexico City, Mexico	
6	Win	5–0–1	Fabiola Benitez	RTD	1 (6)	Feb 27, 2016	Deportivo Leandro Valle, Mexico City, Mexico	
5	Draw	4–0–1	Diana Laura Fernandez	SD	6	Sep 26, 2015	Olympic Swimming Facilities, Mexico City, Mexico	
4	Win	4–0	Yesenia Tovar	SD	6	May 30, 2015	Gimnasio Sportyka, Colonia Nápoles, Mexico	
3	Win	3–0	Jessica Martinez Castillo	MD	4	Aug 21, 2014	Jose Cuervo Salon, Polanco, Mexico	
2	Win	2–0	Nadia Alvarez	SD	4	Jul 3, 2014	Jose Cuervo Salon, Polanco, Mexico	
1	Win	1–0	Perla Perez	PTS	4	Jun 5, 2014	Jose Cuervo Salon, Polanco, Mexico	

== See also ==
- List of female boxers

Sporting positions
World boxing titles
Preceded by Nazarena Romero	WBA super-bantamweight champion 10 May 2025 – 5 April 2026	Succeeded by Ellie Scotney
