= Yazmín Rivas =

Mexican boxer born 1988

Personal information
- Nickname: La Rusita
- Born: Yazmín Rusita Rivas Hernandez; 17 January 1988 (age 38) Torreón, Coahuila de Zaragoza, Mexico
- Height: 5 ft 4 in (163 cm)
- Weight: Flyweight; Super flyweight; Bantamweight; Super bantamweight

Boxing career
- Reach: 65 in (165 cm)
- Stance: Orthodox

Boxing record
- Total fights: 58
- Wins: 40
- Win by KO: 11
- Losses: 13
- Draws: 1
- No contests: 4

Yazmín Rusita Rivas Hernandez (born 17 January 1988) is a Mexican professional boxer. She has held world championships in three weight classes, including the World Boxing Association (WBA) female super flyweight title in 2005; the International Boxing Federation (IBF) female bantamweight title from 2011 to 2013; the World Boxing Council (WBC) female bantamweight title from 2014 to 2016; and the WBA female super bantamweight title in 2018.

== Professional career ==
Aged just 13, Rivas made her professional debut on 9 November 2001, scoring a first-round technical knockout (TKO) victory against Angeles Mosso in Mexico.

After compiling a record of 7–2 (4 KOs), she defeated Martha Leticia Arevalo via ten-round unanimous decision (UD) to capture the vacant Mexican interim female bantamweight title on 21 August 2004, at the Palenque de la Expo in Ciudad Obregón, Mexico. Two judges scored the bout 100–93 and the third scored it 99–91.

In her next fight she faced Lucia Avalos for the inaugural WBA female super flyweight title on 28 February 2005, at the Palenque del Hipódromo de Agua Caliente in Tijuana, Mexico. Rivas captured her first world title via UD, with the judges' scorecards reading 99–91, 99–91 and 97–93.

Four fights later she moved up in weight to challenge for a second world championship, the WBC female bantamweight title, against reigning champion Kwang Ok Kim on 21 October 2005, at the Jungjuyoung Gymnasium in Pyongyang, North Korea. Rivas suffered the third defeat of her career, losing by UD over ten rounds.

Following the defeat she went on a five-fight winning streak before moving up another weight class to challenge Marcela Acuña for the WBC female super bantamweight title. The bout took place on 20 April 2007, at the Andes Talleres Sport Club in Godoy Cruz, Argentina. Rivas lost by UD, with one judge scoring the bout 100–88 and the other two scoring it 99–90.

Two fights later she suffered another defeat after moving up another weight class, losing by UD against WIBF featherweight champion Ina Menzer on 28 July 2007, at the Burg-Waechter Castello in Düsseldorf, Germany. The judges' scorecards read 100–90, 99–91 and 99–92.

Following two wins she faced Jackie Nava for the WBC interim female super bantamweight title, losing via UD on 17 May 2008, at the Plaza Monumental in Aguascalientes City, Mexico.

After two years out of the ring, Rivas returned to action in January 2010 to score a UD victory against Magdalena Leija before facing Zulina Muñoz for the vacant WBC Youth female bantamweight title. The bout took place on 27 March 2010 at the Deportivo Trabajadores del Metro in Mexico City, Mexico. Rivas suffered the seventh defeat of her career, losing by UD with the judges' scorecards reading 97–93, 97–93 and 96–94.

In 2011 she participated in the reality TV show Champions Challenge. Out of four bouts on the show, she scored three wins and a draw, all of which are listed by BoxRec as no contests as the events were not sanctioned by the Mexican boxing commission.

Following her appearance on Champions Challenge, Rivas defeated Gabriela Gonzalez via ninth-round corner retirement (RTD) on 14 July 2011, capturing the vacant NABF female flyweight title at Jose Cuervo Salon in Mexico City.

She next faced former world champion Susie Ramadan for the vacant IBF female bantamweight title on 15 October 2011, at the Centro Internacional de Convenciones in Chetumal, Mexico. Rivas defeated Ramadan via ten-round split decision (SD) to become a two-weight world champion. Two judges scoring the bout 97–93 in favour of Rivas while the third scored it 96–94 for Ramadan.

Following four successful defences of her title, she faced Jessica Gonzalez for the WBC interim bantamweight title on 2 November 2013, at the Auditorio General Arteaga in Querétaro, Mexico. Rivas suffered the eighth defeat of her career, losing via SD over ten rounds. Rivas' IBF title was not up for grabs.

She bounced back from this defeat with a UD victory against Calista Silgado on 18 January 2014, capturing the vacant WBC Silver female super bantamweight title at the Complejo Panamericano de Voleibol in Guadalajara, Mexico, before facing former world champion Alesia Graf for the vacant WBC female bantamweight title. The bout took place on 28 June 2014 at the Centro de Espectáculos in Epazoyucan, Mexico, with Rivas emerging the victor via ten-round UD. One judge scored the bout 99–91 and the other two scored it 98–90.

She successfully defended her title four times–including a rematch against Ramadan–before facing Catherine Phiri on 30 January 2016, at the Centro de Convenciones in Rosarito Beach, Mexico. The fight was stopped at the end of the sixth round, on advice from the ringside doctor, after Rivas suffered a cut from an accidental clash of heads, with the result relying in the judges' scorecards. Rivas was handed her ninth defeat, losing via technical decision (TD), with two judges scoring the six completed rounds 59–55 and 58–55 in favour of Phiri, while the third judge scored the bout even at 57–57.

She next fought Ana María Lozana for the vacant WBC interim female bantamweight title on 14 May 2016, at the Autonomous University of Tamaulipas, Mexico. The bout ended in a third-round technical draw after Rivas was again cut from an accidental clash of heads, leaving the WBC interim title vacant.

She next had a rematch against Jessica Gonzalez on 27 August 2016, at the Palenque de la Feria in Gómez Palacio, Mexico, with the vacant WBC International female super bantamweight title on the line. Rivas evened the score with her former foe, winning via SD with two judges scoring the bout 96–94 and 96–94 in favour of Rivas while the third judge scored it 96–97 for Gonzalez.

Following the win, she challenged four-weight world champion (now seven-weight champion) Amanda Serrano for Serrano's WBO female super bantamweight title. The bout took place on 14 January 2017 at the Barclays Center in New York City. In a fight which was the first English-language women's world title contest to be aired on national television in the U.S., Rivas suffered the tenth defeat of her career, losing via ten-round UD with the judges' scorecards reading 99–91, 98–92 and 97–93. According to CompuBox, Rivas landed 97 out of 332 power punches (29 percent) while Serrano landed 177 out of 431 (44 percent).

After a UD victory against Nazly Maldonado in March 2017, Rivas won the WBC International title for a second time with a SD victory against Yareli Larios on 21 October at the Estadio Centenario in Cuernavaca, Mexico.

In her next fight she challenged WBA female super bantamweight champion Liliana Palmera on 19 May 2018, at the Coliseo Miguel "Happy" Lora in Montería, Columbia. Rivas knocked the champion to the canvas in the fifth round. Palmera was able to make it back to her feet before the referee's count of ten only to be on the receiving end of a sustained attack, prompting the referee to call a halt to the contest, handing Rivas a fifth-round TKO victory to become a three-weight world champion.

== Professional boxing record ==
58 fights	40 wins	13 losses
By knockout	11	0
By decision	29	13
Draws	1	
No contests	4	

No.	Result	Record	Opponent	Type	Round, time	Date	Location	Notes
58	Loss	40–13–1 (4)	Magali Rodriguez	UD	8	29 Mar 2024	Ciudad Acuna, Coahuila de Zaragoza, Mexico	
57	Loss	40–12–1 (4)	Samantha Worthington	UD	10	20 Jan 2024	Muhammad Ali Center, Louisville, Kentucky, USA	For the vacant UBO super lightweight title
56	Loss	40–11–1 (4)	Miranda Reyes	UD	6	8 Sep 2023	Volcan, Houston, Texas, USA	
55	Win	40–10–1 (4)	Ana María Lozano	UD	10	22 Jun 2019	Ahualulco de Mercado, Mexico	
54	Win	39–10–1 (4)	Cristina Del Valle Pacheco	UD	10	10 Nov 2018	Auditorio Municipal, Tijuana, Mexico	Retained WBA female super bantamweight title
53	Win	38–10–1 (4)	Liliana Palmera	TKO	5 (10), 1:45	19 May 2018	Coliseo Miguel "Happy" Lora, Montería, Columbia	Won WBA female super bantamweight title
52	Win	37–10–1 (4)	Yareli Larios	SD	10	21 Oct 2017	Estadio Centenario, Cuernavaca, Mexico	Won vacant WBC International female super bantamweight title
51	Win	36–10–1 (4)	Nazly Maldonado	UD	10	4 Mar 2017	Restaurante Arroyo, Mexico City, Mexico	
50	Loss	35–10–1 (4)	Amanda Serrano	UD	10	14 Jan 2017	Barclays Center, New York City, New York, U.S.	For WBO female super bantamweight title
49	Win	35–9–1 (4)	Jessica Gonzalez	SD	10	27 Aug 2016	Palenque de la Feria, Gómez Palacio, Mexico	Won vacant WBC International female super bantamweight title
48	Draw	34–9–1 (4)	Ana María Lozano	TD	3 (10)	14 May 2016	Gimnasio UAT, Reynosa, Mexico	For vacant WBC interim female bantamweight title; Fight stopped after Rivas was cut from an accidental head clash
47	Loss	34–9 (4)	Catherine Phiri	TD	6 (10), 3:00	30 Jan 2016	Centro de Convenciones, Rosarito Beach, Mexico	Lost WBC female bantamweight title; Fight stopped after Rivas was cut from an accidental head clash, Phiri declared winner by MD
46	Win	34–8 (4)	Kandy Sandoval	UD	10	29 Aug 2015	El Domo, San Luis Potosí City, Mexico	Retained WBC female bantamweight title
45	Win	33–8 (4)	Simone Aparecida da Silva	TKO	6 (10), 1:37	23 May 2015	Polideportivo Centenario, Los Mochis, Mexico	Retained WBC female bantamweight title
44	Win	32–8 (4)	Celina Salazar	UD	10	14 Mar 2015	Auditorio Municipal Fausto Gutiérrez Moreno, Tijuana, Mexico	Retained WBC female bantamweight title
43	Win	31–8 (4)	Susie Ramadan	UD	10	25 Oct 2014	Auditorio Centenario, Gómez Palacio, Mexico	Retained WBC female bantamweight title
42	Win	30–8 (4)	Alesia Graf	UD	10	28 Jun 2014	Centro Espectáculos, Epazoyucan, Mexico	Won vacant WBC female bantamweight title
41	Win	29–8 (4)	Calista Silgado	UD	10	18 Jan 2014	Complejo Panamericano de Voleibol, Guadalajara, Mexico	Won vacant WBC Silver female super bantamweight title
40	Loss	28–8 (4)	Jessica Gonzalez	SD	10	2 Nov 2013	Auditorio General Arteaga, Querétaro, Mexico	For vacant WBC interim female bantamweight title
39	Win	28–7 (4)	Kimika Miyoshi	UD	10	29 Jun 2013	Unidad Deportiva López Mateos, Apatzingán, Mexico	Retained IBF female bantamweight title
38	Win	27–7 (4)	Maria Elena Villalobos	SD	10	2 Feb 2013	Auditorio General Arteaga, Querétaro, Mexico	Retained IBF female bantamweight title
37	Win	26–7 (4)	Mayerlin Rivas	UD	10	3 Nov 2012	Unidad Deportiva El Chamizal, Zamora, Mexico	Retained IBF female bantamweight title
36	Win	25–7 (4)	Nydia Feliciano	UD	10	23 Jun 2012	Gimnasio Miguel Hidalgo, Puebla, Mexico	Retained IBF female bantamweight title
35	Win	24–7 (4)	Edith Soledad Matthysse	UD	10	4 Feb 2012	Gimnasio de las Liebres, Río Bravo, Mexico	Retained IBF female bantamweight title
34	Win	23–7 (4)	Susie Ramadan	SD	10	15 Oct 2011	Centro Internacional de Convenciones, Chetumal, Mexico	Won vacant IBF female bantamweight title
33	Win	22–7 (4)	Gabriela Gonzalez	RTD	9 (10), 2:00	14 Jul 2011	Jose Cuervo Salon, Mexico City, Mexico	Won vacant WBC-NABF female flyweight title
32	NC	21–7 (4)	Linda Laura Lecca	UD	6	9 Apr 2011	Poliforum Mezoamericano, Tuxtla Gutiérrez, Mexico	Unsanctioned bout on Champions Challenge reality TV show; Rivas declared winner by UD
31	NC	21–7 (3)	Irma Garcia	PTS	6	9 Apr 2011	Poliforum Mezoamericano, Tuxtla Gutiérrez, Mexico	Unsanctioned bout on Champions Challenge reality TV show; Result was announced as a draw
30	NC	21–7 (2)	Jennifer Santiago	UD	6	2 Apr 2011	Poliforum Mezoamericano, Tuxtla Gutiérrez, Mexico	Unsanctioned bout on Champions Challenge reality TV show; Rivas declared winner by UD
29	NC	21–7 (1)	Crystal Hoy	UD	6	26 Mar 2011	Poliforum Mezoamericano, Tuxtla Gutiérrez, Mexico	Unsanctioned bout on Champions Challenge reality TV show; Rivas declared winner by UD
28	Loss	21–7	Zulina Muñoz	UD	10	27 Mar 2010	Deportivo Trabajadores del Metro, Iztacalco, Mexico	For vacant WBC Youth female bantamweight title
27	Win	21–6	Magdalena Leija	UD	6	1 Jan 2010	Gimnasio Municipal, Gómez Palacio, Mexico	
26	Win	20–6	Jackie Nava	UD	10	17 May 2008	Plaza Monumental, Aguascalientes City, Mexico	For WBC interim female super bantamweight title
25	Win	20–5	Lina Ramirez	UD	10	29 Feb 2008	Auditorio Centenario, Gómez Palacio, Mexico	
24	Win	19–5	Alicia Reyes	UD	8	1 Jan 2008	Auditorio Centenario, Gómez Palacio, Mexico	
23	Loss	18–5	Ina Menzer	UD	10	28 Jul 2007	Burg-Waechter Castello, Düsseldorf, Germany	For WIBF featherweight title
22	Win	18–4	Diana Diaz	TKO	2 (8)	7 Jul 2007	Arena Kid Azteca, Ciudad Altamirano, Mexico	
21	Loss	17–4	Marcela Acuña	UD	10	20 Apr 2007	Andes Talleres Sport Club, Godoy Cruz, Argentina	For WBA female super bantamweight title
20	Win	17–3	Elizabeth Aguillon	KO	1 (6), 2:45	2 Feb 2007	Arena Coliseo, Monterrey, Mexico	
19	Win	16–3	Rocio Vazquez	UD	10	3 Nov 2006	Camino Real Hotel, El Paso, Texas, U.S.	
18	Win	15–3	Silvia Zúñiga	PTS	8	1 Apr 2006	Plaza Los Tres Presidentes, Guaymas, Mexico	
17	Win	14–3	Silvia Zúñiga	UD	8	31 Mar 2006	Palenque Vicente Fernandez, Gómez Palacio, Mexico	
16	Win	13–3	Lina Ramirez	SD	8	1 Jan 2006	Palenque Vicente Fernandez, Gómez Palacio, Mexico	
15	Loss	12–3	Kwang Ok Kim	UD	10	21 Oct 2005	Jungjuyoung Gymnasium, Pyongyang, North Korea	For WBC female bantamweight title
14	Win	12–2	Martha Leticia Arevalo	TKO	6 (6)	2 Sep 2005	Centro de Espectáculos Modelo, Ciudad Obregón, Mexico	
13	Win	11–2	Susana Morales	UD	8	24 Jun 2005	Plaza de Toros Calafia, Mexicali, Mexico	
12	Win	10–2	Adriana Moreno	TKO	1 (10)	3 Jun 2005	Auditorio Municipal, Torreón, Mexico	
11	Win	9–2	Lucia Avalos	UD	10	28 Feb 2005	Palenque del Hipódromo de Agua Caliente, Tijuana, Mexico	Won vacant WBA female super flyweight title
10	Win	8–2	Martha Leticia Arevalo	UD	10	21 Aug 2004	Palenque de la Expo, Ciudad Obregón, Mexico	Won vacant Mexican interim female bantamweight title
9	Win	7–2	Martha Leticia Arevalo	UD	6	16 Jul 2004	Auditorio General Arteaga, Querétaro City, Mexico	
8	Loss	6–2	Jackie Nava	UD	6	24 Apr 2004	Palenque de Gallos, Tuxtla Gutiérrez, Mexico	
7	Win	6–1	Guadalupe Marroquin	TKO	1 (6), 1:54	12 Mar 2004	Palenque Vicente Fernandez, Gómez Palacio, Mexico	
6	Win	5–1	Lina Ramirez	SD	6	28 Nov 2003	Gómez Palacio, Mexico	
5	Win	4–1	Maria del Refugio Sanchez	KO	1 (6)	1 Jan 2003	Mexico	
4	Loss	3–1	Lorena Roque	UD	6	2 Aug 2002	Arena Olimpíco Laguna, Gómez Palacio, Mexico	
3	Win	3–0	Soraya Paniagua	PTS	6	17 May 2002	Guadalajara, Mexico	
2	Win	2–0	Marisol Dominguez	TKO	2 (4)	15 Dec 2001	Mexico	
1	Win	1–0	Angeles Mosso	TKO	1 (4)	9 Nov 2001	Mexico	

Sporting positions
Regional boxing titles
New title	Mexican female bantamweight champion Interim title 21 August 2004 – February 2005	Vacant Title next held by Esmeralda Moreno
Vacant Title last held by Irma Sánchez	WBC–NABF female flyweight champion 14 July – October 2011	Vacant Title next held by Joselyn Arroyo Ruiz
Vacant Title last held by Marcela Acuña	WBC female super bantamweight champion Silver title 18 January – May 2014	Vacant Title next held by Sabrina Maribel Perez
Vacant Title last held by Heather Hardy	WBC International female super bantamweight champion 27 August 2016 – January 2017	Vacant Title next held by Jackie Nava
Vacant Title last held by Jackie Nava	WBC International female super bantamweight champion 21 October 2017 – May 2018	Vacant Title next held by Yamileth Mercado
World boxing titles
Inaugural champion	WBA female super flyweight champion 28 February – June 2005	Vacant Title next held by Ha-Na Kim
Vacant Title last held by Susie Ramadan	IBF female bantamweight champion 15 October 2011 – November 2013	Vacant Title next held by Janeth Pérez
Vacant Title last held by Susie Ramadan	WBC female bantamweight champion 28 June 2014 – 30 January 2016	Succeeded by Catherine Phiri
Preceded by Liliana Palmera	WBA female super bantamweight champion 19 May 2018 – 2019	Vacant Title next held by Mayerlin Rivas
