= List of WBA female world champions =

The following is a list of WBA female world champions certificated by the World Boxing Association (WBA).

Stand: October 11, 2026.

| Current champion |
| Most consecutive title defenses |

^{r} – Champion relinquished title.
^{s} – Champion stripped of title.

During the 2009 WBA convention in Colombia, Susi Kentikian was named the first ever WBA female Super Champion. It was announced that this belt would be called "Susi Kentikian belt" for all other future Super Champions.

== Light minimumweight ==
| No. | Name | Duration of reign | Defences |
|---|---|---|---|
| 1 | (Japan) Mari Ando | Sep 22, 2011 — Sep 16, 2012 | 1 |
| 2 | (Japan) Ayaka Miyao | Sep 16, 2012 — Oct 22, 2015 | 5 |
| 3 | (Japan) Momo Koseki | Oct 22, 2015 — 2016^{r} | 0 |
| 4 | (Japan) Yunoka Furukawa | Aug 13, 2016 — 2017^{s} | 1 |
| 5 | (Venezuela) María Milano – Interim champion promoted | Mar 9, 2018 — 2018^{s} | 0 |
| 6 | (Mexico) Monserrat Alarcón | Aug 31, 2018 — Aug 5, 2023 | 4 |
| 7 | (Japan) Yuko Kuroki | Aug 5, 2023 — Jan 12, 2024 | 0 |
| 8 | (Japan) Eri Matsuda | Jan 12, 2024 — Nov 23, 2024 | 0 |
| 9 | (Germany) Tina Rupprecht | Nov 23, 2024 — Oct 2025^{r} | 1 |
| 10 | (Spain) Isabel Rivero | Nov 21, 2025 - present | 0 |

== Minimumweight ==
| No. | Name | Duration of reign | Defences |
|---|---|---|---|
| 1 | (Canada) Vaia Zaganas | Apr 8, 2004 — 2005^{r} | 0 |
| 2 | (South Korea) Cho Rong Son | Dec 9, 2006 — Apr 11, 2009 | 2 |
| 3 | (Japan) Etsuko Tada | Apr 11, 2009 — Jul 23, 2013 | 9 |
| 4 | (Mexico) Anabel Ortiz | Jul 23, 2013 — Mar 20, 2021 | 12 |
| 5 | (United States) Seniesa Estrada | Mar 20, 2021 — Oct 23, 2024^{r} | 6 |
| 6 | (Japan) Yuko Kuroki | Jan 21, 2025 — Oct 18, 2025 | 2 |
| 7 | (Germany) Sarah Bormann | Oct 18, 2025 — present | 0 |

== Light flyweight ==
| No. | Name | Duration of reign | Defences |
|---|---|---|---|
| 1 | (South Korea) Ju Hee Kim | Aug 24, 2007 — 2009^{s} | 0 |
| 2 | (Argentina) Yésica Bopp – Super champion (Promoted from Regular champion November 2020) | Jun 20, 2009 — Mar 11, 2022 | 20 |
| 3 | (Mexico) Jessica Nery Plata – Super champion | Mar 11, 2022 — Nov 2024^{r} | 2 |
| 4 | (Mexico) Guadalupe Bautista – Regular champion | Dec 12, 2020 — Apr 27, 2024 | 3 |
| 5 | (Canada) Sara Bailey – (Promoted from Regular champion November 2024) | Apr 27, 2024 — Sep 20, 2025 | 2 |
| 6 | (Argentina) Evelyn Nazarena Bermúdez | Sep 20, 2025 - Jun 13, 2026 | 1 |
| 7 | (Mexico) Estefany Alegria | Jun 13, 2026 — present | 0 |

== Flyweight ==
| No. | Name | Duration of reign | Defences |
|---|---|---|---|
| 1 | (Germany) Susi Kentikian (Super Champion from Nov 18, 2009 - May 16, 2012) | Feb 16, 2007 — Dec 1, 2012 | 14 |
| 2 | (United States) Carina Moreno | Dec 1, 2012 — Jul 6, 2013 | 0 |
| 3 | (Germany) Susi Kentikian (2) | Jul 6, 2013 — 2016^{s} | 4 |
| 4 | (Japan) Naoko Fujioka | Mar 13, 2017 — Apr 9, 2022 | 3 |
| 5 | (United States) Marlen Esparza | April 9, 2022 - Apr 26, 2024^{s} | 2 |
| 6 | (Argentina) Gabriela Celeste Alaniz | Apr 27, 2024 - Nov 2, 2024 | 0 |
| 7 | (United States) Gabriela Fundora | Nov 2, 2024 - present | 3 |

== Super flyweight ==
| No. | Name | Duration of reign | Defences |
|---|---|---|---|
| 1 | (Mexico) Yazmín Rivas | Feb 28, 2005 — 2006^{r} | 0 |
| 2 | (South Korea) Ha-Na Kim | Oct 7, 2006 — Oct 9, 2007 | 2 |
| 3 | (China) Zhang Xiyan | Oct 9, 2007 — Feb 26, 2009 | 0 |
| 4 | (Japan) Tenkai Tsunami | Feb 26, 2009 — Jul 9, 2012 | 4 |
| 5 | (Japan) Naoko Yamaguchi | Jul 9, 2012 — Nov 13, 2013 | 2 |
| 6 | (Japan) Naoko Fujioka | Nov 13, 2013 — 2015^{r} | 2 |
| 7 | (Peru) Linda Laura Lecca – Interim champion promoted | Apr 15, 2016 — May 19, 2018 | 2 |
| 8 | (Mexico) Maribel Ramírez | May 19, 2018 — June 24, 2022 | 2 |
| 9 | (Argentina) Clara Lescurat | June 24, 2022 — Nov 2024^{r} | 4 |
| 10 | (United States) Jasmine Artiga | Mar 22, 2025 — Jun 13, 2026 | 3 |
| 11 | (Panama) Nataly Delgado | Jun 23, 2026 — present | 3 |

== Bantamweight ==
| No. | Name | Duration of reign | Defences |
|---|---|---|---|
| 1 | (Mexico) Jackie Nava | Feb 28, 2005 — 2005^{r} | 0 |
| 2 | (Denmark) Anita Christensen | Oct 14, 2006 — Jun 21, 2008 | 1 |
| 3 | (Bulgaria) Galina Ivanova | Jun 21, 2008 — 2008^{s} | 0 |
| 4 | (Italy) Emanuela Pantani | Dec 19, 2008 — 2010^{s} | 0 |
| 5 | (Mexico) Janeth Pérez | Jul 16, 2011 — Jan 5, 2013 | 3 |
| 6 | (Mexico) Irma García | Jan 5, 2013 — 2015^{s} | 2 |
| 7 | (Venezuela) Mayerlin Rivas – Interim champion promoted | Mar 8, 2015 — Feb 29, 2020^{r} | 4 |
| 8 | (United Kingdom) Shannon Courtenay – (def. Ebanie Bridges) | Apr 10, 2021 — Oct 8, 2021^{s} | 0 |
| 9 | (United States) Jamie Mitchell | Oct 9, 2021— Nov 26, 2022 | 1 |
| 10 | (United Kingdom) Nina Hughes | Nov 26, 2022 — May 12, 2023 | 2 |
| 11 | (New Zealand) Cherneka Johnson | May 12, 2024 — present | 3 |

== Super bantamweight ==
| No. | Name | Duration of reign | Defences |
|---|---|---|---|
| 1 | (Argentina) Marcela Eliana Acuña | Aug 12, 2006 — Jan 20, 2010^{s} | 5 |
| 2 | (Trinidad and Tobago) Lisa Brown | Mar 27, 2010 — Apr 2, 2011 | 0 |
| 3 | (Panama) Chanttall Martínez | Apr 2, 2011 — Jan 28, 2012 | 2 |
| 4 | (Argentina) Yésica Marcos | Oct 6, 2012 — 2016^{s} | 3 |
| 5 | (Mexico) Jackie Nava | Jan 28, 2012 — May 24, 2014 | 2 |
| 6 | (Mexico) Jackie Nava (2) – Interim, elevated to Super champion on October 15, 2014 | May 24, 2014 — 2016^{s} | 3 |
| 7 | (Colombia) Liliana Palmera – Interim champion promoted | Apr 15, 2016 — Aug 5, 2017 | 1 |
| 8 | (Venezuela) Alys Sánchez | Aug 5, 2017 — Nov 18, 2017 | 0 |
| 9 | (Colombia) Liliana Palmera (2) | Nov 18, 2017 — May 19, 2018 | 0 |
| 10 | (Mexico) Yazmín Rivas | May 19, 2018 — Dec 31, 2019^{r} | 1 |
| 11 | (Venezuela) Mayerlin Rivas | Feb 7, 2020 — Nov 18, 2023 | 2 |
| 12 | (Mexico) Erika Cruz | Nov 18, 2023 — Aug 2024^{r} | 1 |
| 13 | (Argentina) Nazarena Romero | Aug 24, 2024 — May 10, 2025 | 0 |
| 14 | (Mexico) Mayelli Flores | May 10, 2025 — Apr 5, 2026 | 0 |
| 15 | (United Kingdom) Ellie Scotney | Apr 5, 2025 — May 12, 2026^{r} | 0 |

== Featherweight ==
| No. | Name | Duration of reign | Defences |
|---|---|---|---|
| 1 | (China) Gao Li Jun | Mar 25, 2006 — 2006^{r} | 0 |
| 2 | (South Korea) Hwa-Won Lee | Apr 30, 2007 — 2008^{r} | 0 |
| 3 | (South Korea) Hyun Mi Choi | Oct 11, 2008 — 2013^{r} | 7 |
| 4 | (Venezuela) Ogleidis Suárez – Interim champion promoted | May 10, 2013 — Dec 13, 2013 | 1 |
| 5 | (Argentina) Edith Soledad Matthysse | Dec 13, 2013 — Mar 11, 2016 | 1 |
| 6 | (Canada) Jelena Mrdjenovich Super champion from Apr 30, 2018 - Sep 30, 2018 | Mar 11, 2016 — Apr 22, 2021 | 5 |
| 7 | (Mexico) Erika Cruz | Apr 22, 2021 — Feb 4, 2023 | 2 |
| 8 | (Puerto Rico) Amanda Serrano | Feb 4, 2023 — present | 3 |

== Super featherweight ==
| No. | Name | Duration of reign | Defences |
|---|---|---|---|
| 1 | (Peru) Kina Malpartida | Feb 21, 2009 — 2013^{s} | 6 |
| 2 | (South Korea) Hyun Mi Choi – Interim champion promoted | Oct 30, 2013 — Dec 2022^{s} | 10 |
| 3 | (United States) Alycia Baumgardner (def. Elhem Mekhaled) | Feb 4, 2023 — Nov 18, 2026^{r} | 5 |
| 4 | (Canada) Leila Beaudoin – Interim champion promoted | Nov 18, 2026 — present | 0 |

== Lightweight ==
| No. | Name | Duration of reign | Defences |
|---|---|---|---|
| 1 | (United States) Layla McCarter | Dec 2, 2006 — 2011^{s} | 2 |
| 2 | (Argentina) Alejandra Oliveras | Aug 12, 2011 — 2012^{r} | 0 |
| 3 | (Uruguay) Cecilia Comunales | Mar 30, 2012 — 2015^{s} | 2 |
| 4 | (Uruguay) Cecilia Comunales (2) | Jun 4, 2016 — 2017^{s} | 0 |
| 5 | (Argentina) Anahí Ester Sánchez | Sep 9, 2017 — Oct 27, 2017^{s} | 0 |
| 6 | (Republic of Ireland) Katie Taylor – Super champion from Apr 30, 2018 - Sep 30, 2018 | Oct 28, 2017 — Dec 2024^{r} | 14 |
| 7 | (United States) Stephanie Han | Feb 22, 2025 — present | 2 |

== Super lightweight ==
| No. | Name | Duration of reign | Defences |
|---|---|---|---|
| 1 | (France) Myriam Lamare | Nov 8, 2004 — Dec 2, 2006 | 5 |
| 2 | (France) Anne Sophie Mathis | Dec 2, 2006 — 2010^{s} | 3 |
| 3 | (Argentina) Mónica Acosta | Feb 18, 2011 — Jan 18, 2014 | 3 |
| 4 | (Argentina) Ana Esteche | Jan 18, 2014 — 2018^{s} | 4 |
| 5 | (Argentina) Anahí Ester Sánchez – Interim champion promoted | Feb 28, 2019 — May 25, 2019 | 0 |
| 6 | (United States) Jessica McCaskill | May 25, 2019 — Aug 2020^{r} | 1 |
| 7 | (United States) Kali Reis | Nov 6, 2020 — Nov 2022^{r} | 2 |
| 8 | (United Kingdom) Chantelle Cameron | Nov 5, 2022 — Nov 25, 2023 | 1 |
| 9 | (Republic of Ireland) Katie Taylor | Nov 25, 2023 — Oct 7, 2026^{r} | 3 |

== Welterweight ==
| No. | Name | Duration of reign | Defences |
|---|---|---|---|
| 1 | (United States) Holly Holm | Jun 10, 2006 — 2007^{r} | 1 |
| 2 | (Norway) Cecilia Braekhus – Super champion from Jul 10, 2014 to Jun 10, 2015, from Aug 29, 2015 to Feb 20, 2016 and again from Apr 30, 2018 to Sep 30, 2018 | Mar 14, 2009 — Aug 15, 2020 | 24 |
| 3 | (United States) Jessica McCaskill | Aug 15, 2020 — May 11, 2024 | 4 |
| 4 | (United Kingdom) Lauren Price | May 11, 2024 - present | 2 |

== Super welterweight ==
| No. | Name | Duration of reign | Defences |
|---|---|---|---|
| 1 | (Trinidad and Tobago) Giselle Salandy | Sep 15, 2006 — Jan 4, 2009 (died in a vehicular accident) | 5 |
| 2 | (United States) Layla McCarter | Sep 30, 2012 — 2014^{s} | 0 |
| 3 | (Costa Rica) Hanna Gabriels – Super champion from Apr 30, 2018 - Sep 30, 2018 | Jun 18, 2016 — 2021 | 4 |
| 4 | (United States) Claressa Shields - Super champion | Mar 5, 2021 - 2021^{r} | 0 |
| 5 | (United Kingdom) Hannah Rankin - Regular champion | Nov 5, 2021 - Sep 24, 2022 | 1 |
| 6 | (United Kingdom) Terri Harper | Sep 24, 2022 - Sep 2024^{r} | 2 |
| 7 | (Canada) Mary Spencer | Sep 5, 2024 — Oct 30, 2025 | 1 |
| 8 | (United States) Mikaela Mayer | Oct 30, 2025 - present | 0 |

== Middleweight ==
| No. | Name | Duration of reign | Defences |
|---|---|---|---|
| 1 | (Bermuda) Teresa Perozzi | Dec 30, 2011 — 2014^{s} | 2 |
| 2 | (United States) Claressa Shields | Jun 22, 2018 — 2025^{r} | 6 |
| 3 | (Australia) Kaye Scott | Dec 20, 2025 — present | 0 |

== Super middleweight ==
| No. | Name | Duration of reign | Defences |
|---|---|---|---|
| 1 | (Russia) Natalya Ragozina | Feb 17, 2007 — 2012^{s} | 6 |
| 2 | (United States) Alicia Napoleon Espinosa | Mar 3, 2018 — Jan 10, 2020 | 2 |
| 3 | (Sweden) Elin Cederroos | Jan 10, 2020 — Apr 30, 2022 | 0 |
| 4 | (United States) Franchón Crews-Dezurn | Apr 30, 2022 — Jul 1, 2023 | 0 |
| 5 | (United Kingdom) Savannah Marshall | Jul 1, 2023 – Mar 2024^{r} | 0 |
| 6 | (United States) Franchón Crews-Dezurn (2) – Interim champion promoted | Mar 24, 2024 — present | 1 |

== Light heavyweight ==
| No. | Name | Duration of reign | Defences |
|---|---|---|---|
| 1 | (Costa Rica) Hanna Gabriels | Apr 17, 2021 — May 2023^{r} | 0 |
| 2 | (Australia) Che Kenneally | Jul 20, 2024 — Feb 22, 2026 | 0 |
| 3 | (United States) Danielle Perkins | Feb 22, 2026 — present | 0 |

== Heavyweight ==
| No. | Name | Duration of reign | Defences |
|---|---|---|---|
| 1 | (United States) Claressa Shields | Feb 2, 2025 — present | 2 |

== See also ==
- List of current female world boxing champions
- List of female undisputed world boxing champions
- List of WBC female world champions
- List of IBF female world champions
- List of WBO female world champions
- List of WIBO world champions
