= Yamileth Mercado =

Mexican boxer (born 1998)

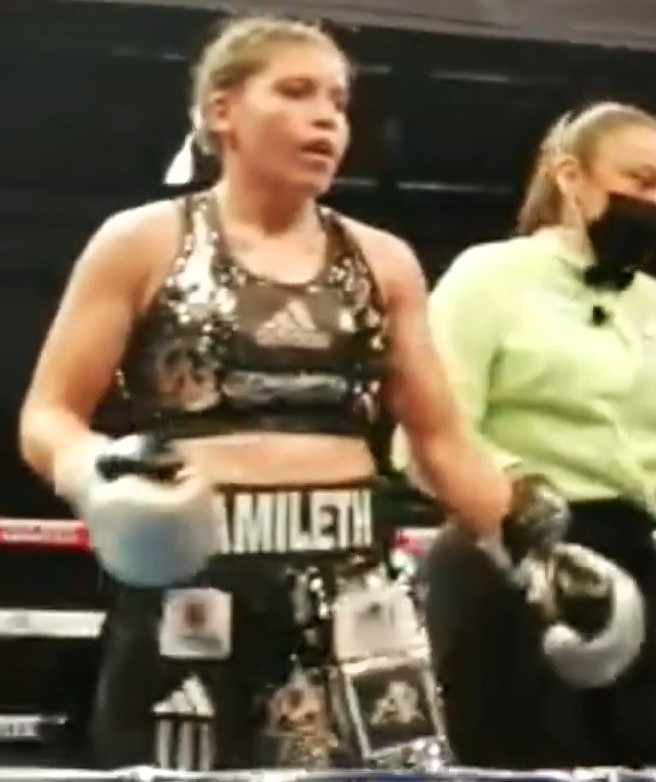
- Mercado during 2021 match

Personal information
- Nickname: Yeimi
- Born: Almendra Yamileth Mercado Duarte; 16 March 1998 (age 28) Ciudad Cuauhtémoc, Mexico
- Height: 5 ft 4 in (163 cm)
- Weight: Super bantamweight

Boxing career
- Stance: Orthodox

Boxing record
- Total fights: 28
- Wins: 24
- Win by KO: 5
- Losses: 4

Almendra Yamileth Mercado Duarte (born 16 March 1998) is a Mexican professional boxer who is a former WBC female super-bantamweight champion.

== Professional career ==
Mercado made her professional debut on 19 July 2014, scoring a first-round unanimous decision (UD) victory over Yoatzin Meraz at the Gimnasio Municipal in Nuevo Casas Grandes, Mexico. She had one more fight in 2014–a UD win against Susana Uribe in December–before securing three more wins in 2015; technical knockout (TKO) wins over Karla Valenzuela in March and Estefania Talamantes in August; followed by an eight-round UD win over Lesly Morales in November.

She had two wins over Diana Gutierrez in 2016–a third-round TKO in March and a six-round UD in an August rematch–before going on to fight Jessica Munoz for the vacant WBC FECOMBOX female super bantamweight title. The bout took place on 3 March 2017 at the Gimnasio Municipal in Nuevo Casas Grandes. Mercado suffered her first professional defeat via UD over ten rounds, with the three judges scoring the bout 100–90, 99–91 and 98–92 in favour of Munoz. Mercado bounced back with two more wins at the end of 2017; a UD against Milagros Diaz in November and a corner retirement (RTD) victory over Juana Felix in December.

She competed four times in 2018, securing UD wins over Marisol Corona in January; Debani Balderas in March; and Beatriz Arangure in June. Her final fight of the year was a world title shot against reigning WBC female super bantamweight champion Fatuma Zarika. The bout took place on 8 September at the Kenyatta International Convention Centre in Nairobi, Kenya. Mercado lost in her first attempt at world honours via split decision (SD), with two judges scoring the bout 99–91 and 97–93 in favour of Zarika, while the third scored it 96–94 to Mercado.

Her first fight of 2019 was on 16 February at the Poliforum in Ciudad Cuauhtémoc, Mexico. Mercado defeated Alys Sanchez via UD over ten rounds with the three judges scoring the bout 100–90, 99–91 and 96–93, awarding Mercado the vacant WBC International title. She successfully defended her title by UD against Karina Fernandez on 28 June, with all three judges scoring the bout 97–91. Her final fight of 2019 was a rematch against WBC world champion Fatuma Zarika. The bout took place on 16 November at the Poliforum in Ciudad Cuauhtémoc. Mercado captured the WBC super bantamweight title via UD over ten rounds. Two judges scored the bout 98–92 while the third scored it 99–91.

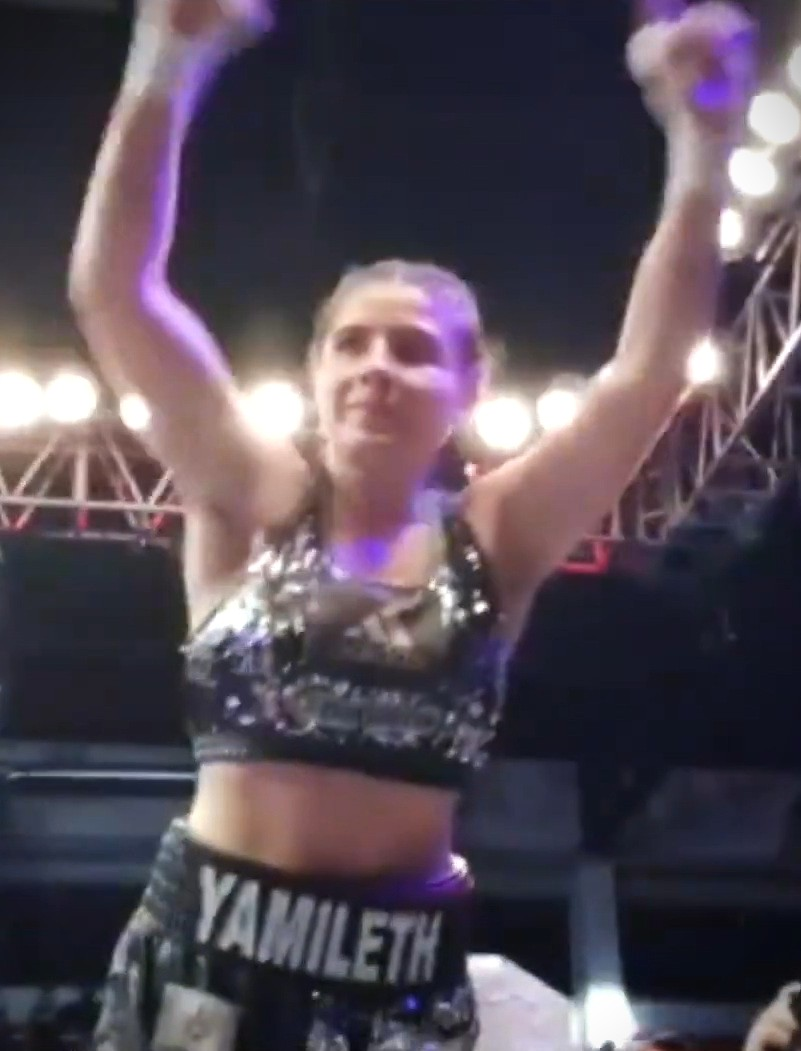
Mercado after defenging her title against Angelica Rascón in 2021

In 2020 Yamileth defeated Irasema Rayas by TKO on the round number 4. Then she defended her super bantamweight title against Alejandra Guzmán and Angelica Rascón winning both fight via unanimous decision.

In 2021 Yamileth went up to featherweight to face the champion Amanda Serrano for both of her titles on the Jake Paul vs. Tyrone Woodley undercard, however after a close match Amanda took the victory via unanimous decision.

Mercado made a successful seventh defense of her WBC super bantamweight title against Ramla Ali at Footprint Center in Phoenix, Arizona on June 29, 2024, winning by unanimous decision.

She faced IBF and WBO female super-bantamweight champion Ellie Scotney in a championship unification at Madison Square Garden in New York City, New York on 11 July 2025, losing by unanimous decision.

== Professional boxing record ==
28 fights	24 wins	4 losses
By knockout	5	0
By decision	19	4

No.	Result	Record	Opponent	Type	Round, time	Date	Location	Notes
28	Lost	24–4	Ellie Scotney	UD	10	11 Jul 2025	Madison Square Garden, New York City, New York, U.S.	Lost WBC super-bantamweight title; For IBF, WBO & The Ring super-bantamweight titles
27	Win	24–3	Ramla Ali	UD	10	29 Jun 2024	Footprint Center, Phoenix, Arizona, U.S.	Retained WBC super-bantamweight title
26	Win	23–3	Linda Laura Lecca	UD	10	27 Apr 2024	Tijuana, Mexico	Retained WBC super-bantamweight title
25	Win	22–3	Paulette Cuesta	UD	10	26 Aug 2023	Cuernavaca, Mexico	
24	Win	21–3	Kudakwashe Chiwandire	UD	10	18 Mar 2023	Chihuahua City, Mexico	Retained WBC super-bantamweight title
23	Win	20–3	Mariana Juárez	UD	10	29 Oct 2022	Mexico City, Mexico	Retained WBC super-bantamweight title
22	Win	19–3	Isis Vargas	UD	10	2 Apr 2022	Gimnasio Rodrigo M. Quevedo, Chihuahua City, Mexico	Retained WBC super-bantamweight title
21	Loss	18–3	Amanda Serrano	UD	10	29 Aug 2021	Rocket Mortgage FieldHouse, Cleveland, Ohio, U.S.	For WBC, WBO, and IBO Featherweight titles
20	Win	18–2	Angelica Rascon	UD	10	26 Jun 2021	Gimnasio Rodrigo M. Quevedo, Chihuahua City, Mexico	Retained WBC super-bantamweight title
19	Win	17–2	Alejandra Guzmán	UD	10	6 Feb 2021	Jardines del Pedregal, Hermosillo, Mexico	Retained WBC super-bantamweight title
18	Win	16–2	Irasema Rayas	TKO	4 (8), 1:36	25 Sep 2020	Grand Hotel, Tijuana, Mexico	
17	Win	15–2	Fatuma Zarika	UD	10	16 Nov 2019	Poliforum, Ciudad Cuauhtémoc, Mexico	Won WBC super-bantamweight title
16	Win	14–2	Karina Fernandez	UD	10	28 Jun 2019	Gimnasio Rodrigo M. Quevedo, Chihuahua City, Mexico	Retained WBC International super-bantamweight title
15	Win	13–2	Alys Sanchez	UD	10	16 Feb 2019	Poliforum, Ciudad Cuauhtémoc, Mexico	Won vacant WBC International super-bantamweight title
14	Loss	12–2	Fatuma Zarika	SD	10	8 Sep 2018	Kenyatta International Convention Centre, Nairobi, Kenya	For WBC super bantamweight title
13	Win	12–1	Beatriz Arangure	UD	6	1 Jun 2018	Gimnasio Solidaridad, Hermosillo, Mexico	
12	Win	11–1	Debani Balderas	UD	6	10 Mar 2018	Gimnasio Rodrigo M. Quevedo, Chihuahua City, Mexico	
11	Win	10–1	Marisol Corona	UD	6	27 Jan 2018	Auditorio Municipal, Tijuana, Mexico	
10	Win	9–1	Juana Felix	RTD	1 (6), 2:00	29 Dec 2017	Gimnasio Municipal Luis Estrada Medina, Guasave, Mexico	
9	Win	8–1	Milagros Diaz	UD	6	11 Nov 2017	Gimnasio Rodrigo M. Quevedo, Chihuahua City, Mexico	
8	Loss	7–1	Jessica Munoz	UD	10	3 Mar 2017	Gimnasio Municipal, Nuevo Casas Grandes, Mexico	For vacant WBC FECOMBOX super-bantamweight title
7	Win	7–0	Diana Gutierrez	UD	6	13 Aug 2016	Gimnasio Municipal, Nuevo Casas Grandes, Mexico	
6	Win	6–0	Diana Gutierrez	TKO	3 (6)	5 Mar 2016	Centro Civico, Ascensión, Mexico	
5	Win	5–0	Lesly Morales	UD	8	14 Nov 2015	Gimnasio Municipal, Nuevo Casas Grandes, Mexico	
4	Win	4–0	Estefania Talamantes	TKO	4 (6), 2:10	15 Aug 2015	Arena Coliseo, Nuevo Casas Grandes, Mexico	
3	Win	3–0	Karla Valenzuela	TKO	1 (6)	21 Mar 2015	Gimnasio Municipal, Nuevo Casas Grandes, Mexico	
2	Win	2–0	Susana Uribe	UD	4	20 Dec 2014	Gimnasio Municipal, Nuevo Casas Geandes, Mexico	
1	Win	1–0	Yoatzin Meraz	UD	4	19 Jul 2014	Gimnasio Municipal, Nuevo Casas Grandes, Mexico	

== See also ==
- List of female boxers

Sporting positions
Regional boxing titles
Vacant Title last held by Yazmín Rivas	WBC International super bantamweight champion 16 February 2019 – 16 November 2019; Won world title	Vacant Title next held by Carly Skelly
World boxing titles
Preceded by Fatuma Zarika	WBC super bantamweight champion 16 November 2019 – 11 July 2025	Succeeded by Ellie Scotney
