= Yulihan Luna =

Mexican boxer (born 1994)

Yuliahn Luna
Personal information
- Nickname: La Cobrita ("The Little Cobra")
- Born: Yuliahn Alejandra Luna Ávila; 21 February 1994 (age 32) Gómez Palacio, Durango, Mexico
- Height: 5 ft 4 in (163 cm)
- Weight: Bantamweight; Super bantamweight

Boxing career
- Reach: 71 in (180 cm)
- Stance: Orthodox

Boxing record
- Total fights: 34
- Wins: 28
- Win by KO: 4
- Losses: 5
- Draws: 1

Yulihan Alejandra Luna Ávila (born 21 February 1994) is a Mexican professional boxer. She is a two-weight world champion, having held the WBC female bantamweight title and the IBF female junior-featherweight title.

== Professional career ==
Luna made her professional debut on 28 October 2011, scoring a four-round unanimous decision victory against Sandra Paulido at the Gimnasio Hermanos Rojas in Gómez Palacio, Mexico. She suffered the first defeat of her career in her next fight, losing by UD over four rounds against Araceli Palacios in May 2012.

After a nine-fight winning streak, she challenged Jéssica Gónzalez for the WBC female interim bantamweight title on 28 June 2014, at the Centro de Espectaculos in Epazoyucan, Mexico. Luna suffered her second defeat, losing by 10-round unanimous decision.

Following a unanimous decision victory against Samantha Estrada in August, Luna faced former WBA female interim super-flyweight champion Carolina Marcela Gutiérrez for the vacant IBF female junior featherweight title on 15 November at the Quorum Hotel in Córdoba, Argentina. All three judges scored the bout 99–91 in favour of Luna, awarding her the IBF title via UD. In her next fight she faced International Female Boxers Association junior-featherweight champion Maureen Shea on 29 August 2015, at The Forum in Inglewood, California. Luna used her height advantage and elected to fight at a distance, using movement and picking her moments to engage while Shea was the aggressor, pressing the action to fight on the inside. After the 10 rounds were complete, one judge scored the bout 97–93 in favour of Luna, the second judge scored it 98–92 to Shea, while the third scored it even at 95–95 to see both boxers retain their titles through a split draw.

She spent two years away from boxing after giving birth, making her return in September 2017 with an eight-round unanimous decision victory against Katia De La Parra. Luna followed up with three more wins before suffering her third defeat, losing via unanimous decision in a non-title bout against reigning WBC female super-flyweight champion Guadalupe Martínez Guzmán on 24 November 2018.

She scored three more wins before facing WBC female bantamweight champion Mariana Juárez on 31 October 2020, at the Grand Oasis Arena in Cancún, Mexico. After a one-sided fight in which Juárez took punishment throughout, two judges scored the bout 100–90 and the third scored it 99–91, all in favour of Luna, awarding her the WBC title via UD to become a two-weight world champion. Juárez caused controversy after the final bell rang; walking across the ring to shout at Luna, accusing her of cheating. Juárez also interrupted Luna's post-fight interview to make her accusations known, saying, "I've been in this sport for 21 years, There's something in those gloves and they know it. The WBC will look into it." Luna responded by saying, "The gloves and hand wraps are [at ringside]. We are athletes. We know how to win. We know how to lose. She was saying that the laces were higher than normal, as if that's the part of the glove I hit her with. We won because of the hard work we did. If she wants a rematch, I'll give it to her. We're not afraid. They can inspect the gloves all they want." Luna's hand wraps and gloves were examined by representatives of the WBC and determined to be legal before the result was announced.

Luna made the first defense of her title at Gimnasio Miguel Hidalgo in Puebla, Mexico, on 2 April 2022, defeating Mayelli Flores by unanimous decision.

On 17 June 2022 at Auditorio Municipal in Torreón, Mexico, she retained her title for a second time with a unanimous decision win over Jéssica Gónzalez, who had beaten her in 2014. Following the fight, the WBC suspended referee Jesus Becerra for three months for failing to deduct a point from Luna for repeated rabbit punches and Gonzalez, who never fought again, was diagnosed with oedema in her brain caused by the illegal blows.

In her third defense, Luna faced WBO female bantamweight champion Dina Thorslund in a title unification bout at Gråkjær Arena in Holstebro, Denmark, on 1 September 2023. She lost via unanimous decision.

Switching weight divisions, Luna fought Skye Nicolson for the vacant the WBC interim female super-bantamweight title at Adventist Health Arena in Stockton, California, USA, on 13 December 2025, losing by unanimous decision.

== Professional boxing record ==
| 34 fights | 28 wins | 5 losses |
|---|---|---|
| By knockout | 4 | 0 |
| By decision | 24 | 5 |
| Draws | 1 | |

| No. | Result | Record | Opponent | Type | Round, time | Date | Location | Notes |
|---|---|---|---|---|---|---|---|---|
| 34 | Loss | 28–5–1 | Skye Nicolson | UD | 10 | 13 Dec 2025 | Adventist Health Arena, Stockton, California, U.S. | For interim WBC super-bantamweight title |
| 33 | Win | 28–4–1 | Dafne Paulina Torres Lopez | UD | 6 | 29 Mar 2025 | Chihuahua City, Mexico | |
| 32 | Win | 27–4–1 | Elizabeth Chavez Espinoza | UD | 8 | 13 Jul 2024 | Gómez Palacio, Mexico | |
| 31 | Win | 26–4–1 | Joana Chavarria Lopez | UD | 8 | 19 Apr 2024 | Los Mochis, Mexico | |
| 30 | Loss | 25–4–1 | Dina Thorslund | UD | 10 | 1 Sep 2023 | Gråkjær Arena, Holstebro, Denmark | Lost WBC bantamweight title; For WBO and inaugural The Ring bantamweight titles |
| 29 | Win | 25–3–1 | Vanesa Lorena Taborda | UD | 10 | 17 Mar 2023 | Fresnillo, Zacatecas, Mexico | |
| 28 | Win | 24–3–1 | Jéssica Gónzalez | UD | 10 | 17 Jun 2022 | Auditorio Municipal, Torreon, Mexico | Retained WBC bantamweight title |
| 27 | Win | 23–3–1 | Mayelli Flores | UD | 10 | 2 Apr 2022 | Gimnasio Miguel Hidalgo, Puebla, Mexico | Retained WBC bantamweight title |
| 26 | Win | 22–3–1 | Karla Valenzuela Garcia | TKO | 8 | 10 Sep 2021 | Arena Olímpico Laguna, Gómez Palacio, Mexico | |
| 25 | Win | 21–3–1 | Barbara Martinez Munoz | UD | 4 (8) | 30 Apr 2021 | Auditorio Municipal, Torreon, Mexico | |
| 24 | Win | 20–3–1 | Mariana Juárez | UD | 10 | 31 Oct 2020 | Grand Oasis Arena, Cancún, Mexico | Won WBC bantamweight title |
| 23 | Win | 19–3–1 | Kathia Rodriguez | RTD | 6 (8), 2:00 | 25 Sep 2020 | Palenque de Gómez Palacio, Gómez Palacio, Mexico | |
| 22 | Win | 18–3–1 | Judith Rodríguez | UD | 8 | 12 Jul 2019 | Unidad Deportiva "Luis Camarena", Ocoyoacac, Mexico | |
| 21 | Win | 17–3–1 | Maria Esperanza Resendiz | UD | 8 | 4 May 2019 | Auditorio Deportiva, Lerdo, Mexico | |
| 20 | Loss | 16–3–1 | Guadalupe Martínez Guzmán | UD | 10 | 24 Nov 2018 | Oasis Hotel Complex, Cancún, Mexico | |
| 19 | Win | 16–2–1 | Arely Valente | SD | 6 | 4 Aug 2018 | Domo del Parque San Rafael, Guadalajara, Mexico | |
| 18 | Win | 15–2–1 | Kandy Sandoval | SD | 10 | 19 May 2018 | Domo del Parque San Rafael, Guadalajara, Mexico | |
| 17 | Win | 14–2–1 | Aholibama Álvarez | TKO | 2 (6) | 7 Apr 2018 | Domo del Parque San Rafael, Guadalajara, Mexico | |
| 16 | Win | 13–2–1 | Katia De La Parra | UD | 8 | 22 Sep 2017 | Gimnasio Unidad Deportivo, Torreón, Mexico | |
| 15 | Draw | 12–2–1 | Maureen Shea | SD | 10 | 29 Aug 2015 | The Forum, Inglewood, California, U.S. | Retained IBF super-bantamweight title; For IFBA super-bantamweight title |
| 14 | Win | 12–2 | Carolina Gutiérrez | UD | 10 | 15 Nov 2014 | Quorum Hotel, Córdoba, Argentina | Won vacant IBF super-bantamweight title |
| 13 | Win | 11–2 | Samantha Estrada | UD | 4 | 20 Aug 2014 | Arena El Jefe, Monterrey, Mexico | |
| 12 | Loss | 10–2 | Jéssica Gónzalez | UD | 10 | 28 Jun 2014 | Centro de Espectaculos, Epazoyucan, Mexico | For interim WBC bantamweight title |
| 11 | Win | 10–1 | Teresa Cuevas | TKO | 1 (6), 0:28 | 15 Mar 2014 | Poliforum, Camargo, Mexico | |
| 10 | Win | 9–1 | Araceli Palacios | SD | 6 | 5 Dec 2013 | Gimnasio Nuevo León, Monterrey, Mexico | |
| 9 | Win | 8–1 | Ivett Valenzuela | UD | 4 | 23 Aug 2013 | Plaza de Toros, Torreón, Mexico | |
| 8 | Win | 7–1 | Margarita Morales | SD | 4 | 18 May 2013 | Chihuahua University, Chihuahua, Mexico | |
| 7 | Win | 6–1 | Estefania Talamantes | UD | 6 | 1 Mar 2013 | Ciudad Juárez, Mexico | |
| 6 | Win | 5–1 | Estefania Talamantes | UD | 4 | 12 Jan 2013 | Gimnasio Municipal, Delicias, Mexico | |
| 5 | Win | 4–1 | Margarita Sanauda | UD | 4 | 17 Nov 2012 | Gimnasio Municipal, Parral, Mexico | |
| 4 | Win | 3–1 | Lesly Morales | SD | 4 | 20 Oct 2012 | Gimnasio Manuel Bernardo Aguirre, Chihuahua City, Mexico | |
| 3 | Win | 2–1 | Jennifer Gutierrez | SD | 4 | 15 Jun 2013 | Arena Vicente Mijares, Gómez Palacio, Mexico | |
| 2 | Loss | 1–1 | Araceli Palacios | UD | 4 | 4 May 2012 | Auditorio del Pueblo, Victoria de Durango, Mexico | |
| 1 | Win | 1–0 | Sandra Pulido | UD | 4 | 28 Oct 2011 | Gimnasio Hermanos Rojas, Gómez Palacio, Mexico | |

== See also ==
- List of female boxers

Sporting positions
World boxing titles
| Vacant Title last held by Katy Wilson Castillo | IBF super-bantamweight champion 15 November 2014 – 2016; Vacated | Vacant Title next held by Marcela Acuña |
| Preceded by Mariana Juárez | WBC bantamweight champion 31 October 2020 – 1 September 2023 | Succeeded by Dina Thorslund |
