= Jake Paul vs. Gervonta Davis =

2025 exhibition boxing match

- Date: November 14, 2025 (cancelled)
- Venue: Kaseya Center, Miami, Florida. U.S.

Tale of the tape
Boxer	Jake Paul	Gervonta Davis
Nickname	El Gallo ("The Rooster")	Tank
Hometown	Cleveland, Ohio, U.S.	Baltimore, Maryland, U.S.
Pre-fight record	12–1 (7 KOs)	30–0–1 (28 KOs)
Age	28 years, 9 months	31 years
Height	6 ft 1 in (1.85 m)	5 ft 5 in (1.65 m)
Style	Orthodox	Southpaw
Recognition		WBA lightweight champion

Jake Paul vs. Gervonta Davis was a scheduled exhibition boxing match between YouTuber Jake Paul and WBA lightweight champion Gervonta Davis. The bout was scheduled to take place on November 14, 2025 at the Kaseya Center in Miami, Florida. The event was to be streamed globally on Netflix. The event was cancelled in light of allegations being brought up against Gervonta Davis.

== Background and build-up ==
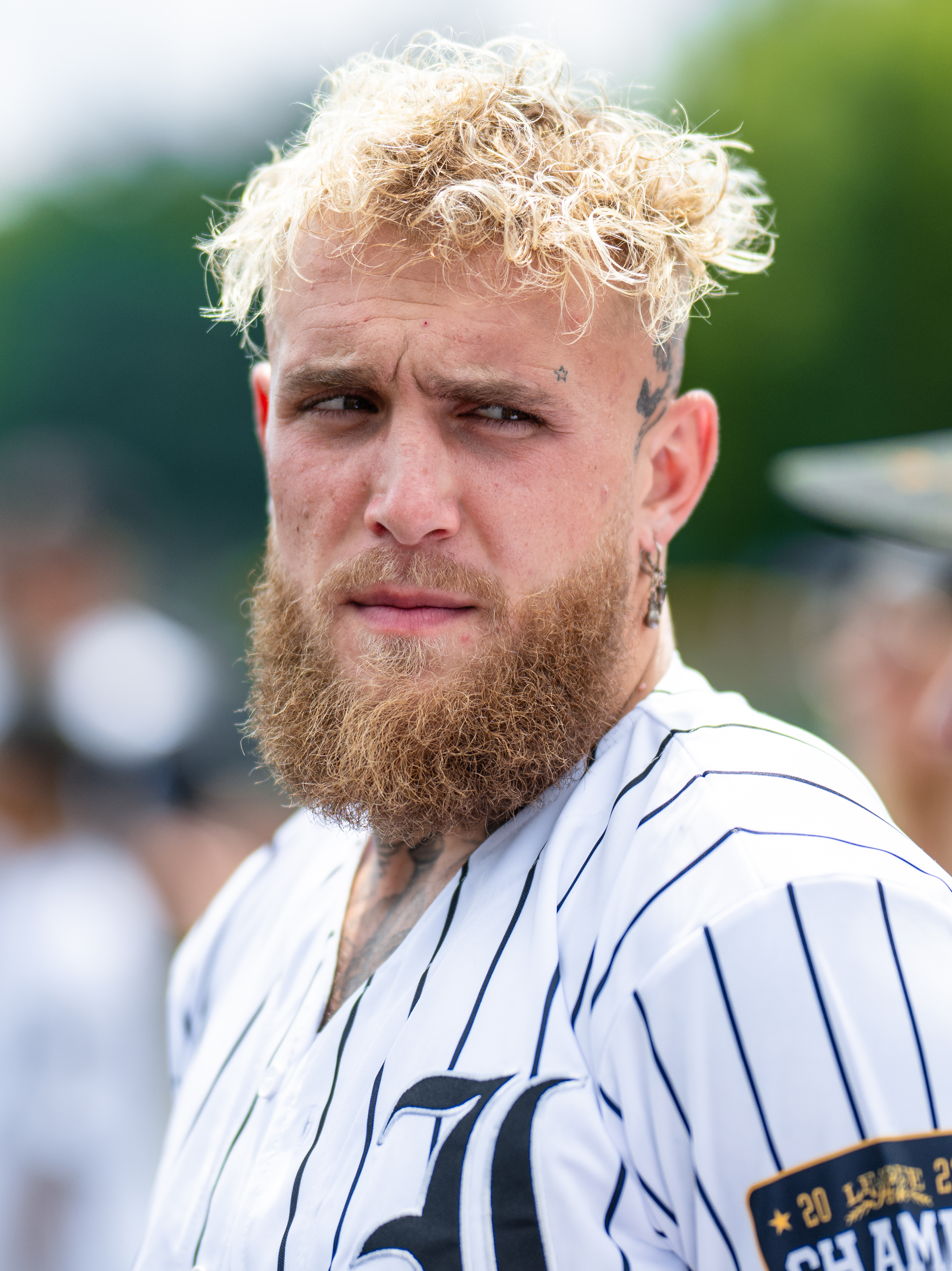
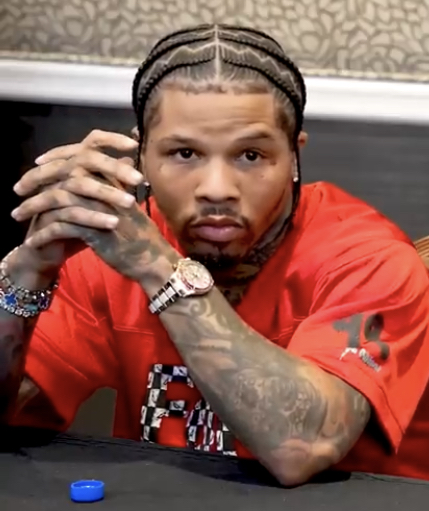
Jake Paul (left) and Gervonta Davis (right).

In early 2025, negotiations for a Canelo Álvarez vs Jake Paul professional boxing match on Cinco de Mayo to be streamed on Netflix were near finalization, with a formal announcement expected soon. However, Canelo instead signed a four-fight deal with Saudi Arabia's Riyadh Season, which lead to Paul having to find another opponent for a bout on Netflix.

Following the Canelo fallout, discussions began speculating around a potential exhibition match with Paul and Gervonta Davis. On March 1, Davis and Lamont Roach Jr.'s bout ended via majority draw, which caused speculation that the bout between Paul and Davis would not take place following the agreed rematch. Davis alluded to the fact that he and Paul were set to announce their bout that night.

On August 20, the Turkish Netflix X/Twitter account accidentally leaked that Paul vs Davis was set to take place on November 15, 2025. Later that day, an official announcement was made, confirming the bout, but the date was actually November 14, because of it taking place in the United States.

On September 17, the event was moved from the State Farm Arena in Atlanta, Georgia to the Kaseya Center in Miami, Florida after both Paul and Davis withdrew their request for event permits in Atlanta. Rick Thompson, chairman of the Georgia Athletic and Entertainment Commission stated that the bout "is the dumbest (expletive) I've ever heard," and "it's a money grabber, and I'm not OK with that."

The launch press conference took place on September 22, 2025. Brian Custer, as the host, faced challenges in creating an engaging atmosphere for the matchup.

Davis arrived on time, a notable exception for him, yet exhibited a deficiency in enthusiasm and overlooked significant details regarding the fight. Paul made a remark regarding Davis's reading abilities, referencing previous challenges he faced in that area, which contributed to awkwardness. Davis refuted the characterization of himself as the face of boxing, whereas Paul asserted that his statistical performance substantiates his position. The exchanges of banter between the fighters lacked vigor, with Davis labeling Paul a "clown" and Paul alluding to Davis's legal issues. Davis expressed indifference towards boxing fans' opinions regarding his upcoming fight with Paul instead of a rematch with Lamont Roach. Davis emphasized that he does not feel obligated to cater to fan expectations, suggesting that their preferences can change frequently. He encouraged fans to focus on enjoying the sport rather than critiquing fighters' personal choices and match decisions. Davis's comments highlight a growing trend among athletes to prioritize their own career paths over public sentiment. it was established that the fight would take place at a catchweight of 195 pounds. Davis showed growing disengagement from boxing. He perceived the exhibition as a standard financial opportunity for fighters approaching retirement. He indicated plans to retire from boxing after the exhibition, remarking that "boxing is dead" and criticizing the sport's absence of loyalty. During the press tour, Davis distanced himself from the designation of "face of boxing" but did not publicly affirm his retirement plans.

Paul recognized Davis as a strong competitor, classifying him as a Top 10 pound-for-pound fighter. He stated that the upcoming bout would be his most challenging to date, underscoring the importance of competing against a skilled opponent such as Davis. Paul aimed to gain respect within the boxing community, which he felt had eluded him despite prior wins against seasoned veterans like Mike Tyson and Julio César Chávez Jr.

=== Cancellation ===
Two weeks prior to the fight, Davis was mentioned in a civil lawsuit that accused him of violent behavior, battery, and kidnapping. There were concerns that this situation could affect the scheduled fight. Promoters and stakeholders expressed serious apprehensions, prompting discussions about potential changes to the event. One consideration was that Netflix might withdraw as the broadcaster in light of the allegations. Alternatives included either postponing the event or securing a substitute opponent. On November 4, Most Valuable Promotions and Netflix announced the cancellation of the card. The statement read:

“Our team has worked closely with all parties to navigate this situation responsibly. While we will not be moving forward with this event, our plan still remains for Jake Paul to headline an event on Netflix in 2025. Details regarding a new date, location, Jake’s opponent, and additional bouts will be shared as soon as they are finalized.”

— Nakisa Bidarian, CEO of Most Valuable Promotions

Paul publicly criticized Davis on the X platform, calling him unprofessional. Ticket refunds were being processed automatically.

On November 17, MVP announced that Paul would instead fight Anthony Joshua on December 19 in Miami at the Kaseya Center, in an eight-round professional heavyweight boxing match with 10oz gloves. Three of the scheduled contestants from this card were rescheduled for Paul vs Joshua. Ellie Scotney vs. Mayelli Flores was rescheduled for April 5, 2026, because of an unrelated injury to Scotney, which led to this contest being removed from the card a month prior. Paul lost via TKO in the sixth round.

== Fight card ==
Weight Class		vs.		Rescheduled Date	Round	Time	Notes
Main Card (Netflix)
Catchweight	Jake Paul	vs.	Gervonta Davis		– (10)		^{Note 1}
Super featherweight	Alycia Baumgardner (c)	vs.	Leila Beaudoin	December 19, 2025	– (12)		^{Note 2}
Super lightweight	Gary Russell (c)	vs.	Andy Hiraoka	February 21, 2026	– (12)		^{Note 3}
Super bantamweight	Ellie Scotney (c)	vs.	Mayelli Flores	April 5, 2026	– (12)		^{Note 4}
Strawweight	Yokasta Valle (c)	vs.	Yadria Bustillos	December 19, 2025	– (12)		^{Note 5}
Welterweight	Avious Griffin	vs.	Justin Cardona	December 19, 2025	– (8)		^{Note 6}
Heavyweight	Anderson Silva	vs.	Chris Weidman		– (6)

^Note 1 Exhibition bout
^Note 2 For IBF and WBO women's super featherweight titles
^Note 3 For WBA super lightweight title
^Note 4 For WBA (Super), WBC, IBF and WBO undisputed super lightweight titles. The contest was postponed in October 2025 because of Scotney's injury in training.
^Note 5 For WBC strawweight title
^Note 6 Griffin's originally scheduled opponent was Cesar Francis, who withdrew because of an injury in training. This contest was also rescheduled.
