= Shane Mosley vs. Ricardo Mayorga II =

Boxing match

Grudge Match
- Date: August 29, 2015
- Venue: The Forum, Inglewood, California, U.S.

Tale of the tape
Boxer	Shane Mosley	Ricardo Mayorga
Nickname	Sugar	El Matador ("The Killer")
Hometown	Pomona, California, U.S.	Masaya, Nicaragua
Purse	$500,000	$250,000
Pre-fight record	47–9–1 (1) (39 KO)	31–8–1 (1) (25 KO)
Age	43 years, 11 months	41 years, 10 months
Height	5 ft 9 in (175 cm)	5 ft 9 in (175 cm)
Weight	159 3/4 lb (72 kg)	165 1/2 lb (75 kg)
Style	Orthodox	Orthodox
Recognition	3-division world champion	2-division world champion

Result
- Mosley wins via 6th-round knockout

Shane Mosley vs. Ricardo Mayorga II, billed as Grudge Match, was a professional boxing match contested on August 29, 2015.

== Background ==
On July 11, 2015, it was announced that 3-division world champion Shane Mosley and Ricardo Mayorga, a world champion in two weight classes, had agreed to face one another the following month in what was a belated rematch to their 2008 contest seven years prior. Mosley, whom had been feuding with Mayorga on Twitter, claimed that fight was made after he had "ran into (Mayorga) in Vegas. Things escalated and, boom, rematch." Both fighters were in their early 40s at the time the rematch was announced and neither had been in a big fight in years; the 43-year old Mosley was ending a two-year retirement which followed a one-year retirement following his 2012 loss to Canelo Alvarez while the 41-year old Mayorga had ended a three-retirement that followed a 2011 loss to Miguel Cotto the year prior.

The fight was put in jeopardy just weeks before it was set to take place when promoter Don King, who had previously promoted Mayorga, filed a lawsuit claiming that Mayorga was violating a promotional agreement King claimed was still in place between the two by working with Mosley's promotional firm GoBox Promotions, which was serving as the sole promoter of the fight. Though Mosley promised that the event would go on with or without Mayorga's involvement, the bout was officially put back on just days before it was to take place when a judge denied King's request to stop the fight and allowed Mayorga to continue on with the fight.

== Fight Details ==
Just as in their first fight, Mosley scored a last second knockout victory over Mayorga, albeit six rounds earlier. Just prior to the sixth round ending, Mosley caught Mayorga with a shot to his liver that sent Mayorga down to his knees in pain. Mayorga protested to Raul Caiz Jr. that he had been hit with a low blow but made no attempt to get to his feet as Caiz reached the count of 10 resulting in the fight being stopped and Mosley being named the winner at 2:59 of the round.

== Fight card ==
Confirmed bouts:

Weight Class	Weight		vs.		Method	Round	Notes
Super Middleweight	168 lbs.	Shane Mosley	def.	Ricardo Mayorga	KO	6/12
Super Bantamweight	122 lbs.	Yulihan Luna (c)	vs.	Maureen Shea	D	10/10x2	^{note 1}
Lightweight	135 lbs.	Joel Díaz Jr.	def.	Luis Arceo	TKO	4/10
Cruiserweight	200 lbs.	Dimar Ortuz	vs.	Victor Barragan	D	8/8
Light Heavyweight	175 lbs.	Ronald Ellis	def.	Jas Phipps	TKO	2/6

^Note 1 For IBF and IBA female super bantamweight titles

== Broadcasting ==
Country	Broadcaster
United Kingdom	BoxNation
United States	Integrated Sports PPV

Preceded by vs. Anthony Mundine	Shane Mosley's bouts 29 August 2015	Succeeded by vs. Patrick López
Preceded by vs. Andrik Saralegui	Ricardo Mayorga's bouts 29 August 2015	Succeeded by vs. Jeudiel Zepeda
