= Mariana Juárez =

Mexican boxer (born 1980)

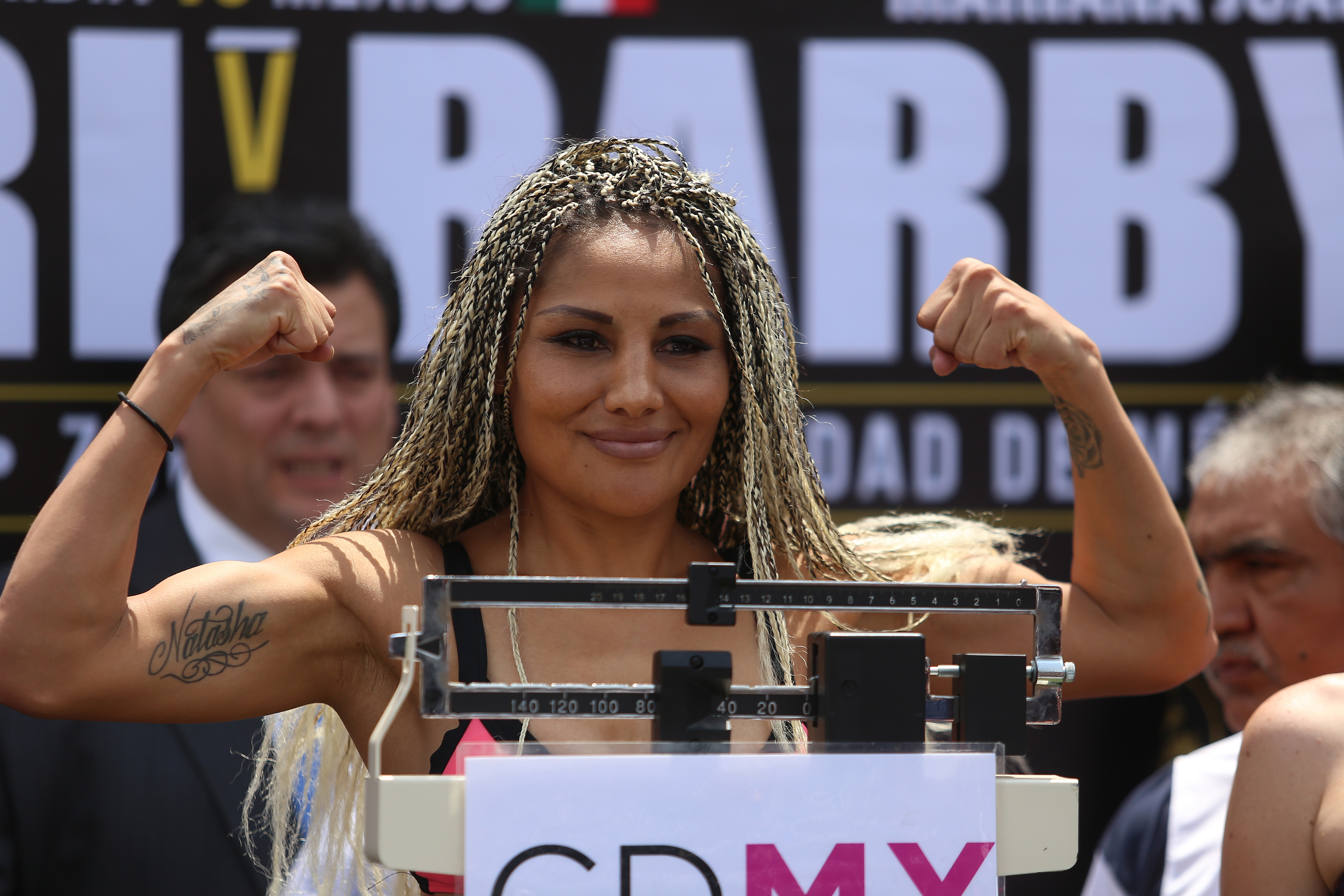
- Juárez in 2017

Personal information
- Nickname: Barbie
- Born: María Anastasia Juárez Trejo; 29 January 1980 (age 46) Santa Urusula, Tlaxcala, Mexico
- Height: 5 ft 5 1/2 in (166 cm)
- Weight: Flyweight; Super flyweight; Bantamweight

Boxing career
- Stance: Orthodox

Boxing record
- Total fights: 73
- Wins: 56
- Win by KO: 20
- Losses: 13
- Draws: 4

María Anastasia Juárez Trejo (born 29 January 1980), better known as Mariana Juárez, is a Mexican professional boxer. She is a former two-division world champion, having held the WBC female flyweight title from March 2011 to October 2012 and the WBC female bantamweight title from April 2017 to October 2020.She is the older sister of boxer Lourdes Juárez, also a former world champion.

== Professional career ==
Juárez made her professional debut on 22 May 1998, scoring a second-round knockout victory over Virginia Esparza in Mexico City, Mexico.

Already the interim title holder for almost two years, Juárez became full WBC female flyweight World champion when she defeated the previously unbeaten Italian Simona Galassi on 11 March 2011, at Jose Cuervo Salon, Polanco, Mexico.

She successfully defended her title seven times before relinquishing it when she lost to Ava Knight via unanimous decision on 13 October 2012, at Palacio de los Deportes, Mexico City, Mexico.

Juárez became a two-weight World champion on 1 April 2017, by securing a unanimous decision victory against Zambia's WBC bantamweight title holder Catherine Phiri at Zócalo, Mexico City, Mexico.

She would hold the belt for more than two years, making nine successful defences before dropping the title via unanimous decision to compatriot Yulihan Luna at the Grand Oasis Arena, Cancun, Mexico on 31 October 2020. The contest was marred by controversy as Juarez, who suffered a broken nose in the opening round, interrupted Luna's post-fight interview to accuse the new champion of using doctored gloves. Officials examined the gloves and ruled them fully legal with Juarez later apologising for her outburst.

Juárez attempted to become a three-weight World champion on 10 June 2023, challenging WBC super-bantamweight title holder Yamileth Mercado at the Toyota Arena, Ontario, California, USA, but lost by unanimous decision.

Back on home soil at Domo Corona del Hipodromo de las Americas, Mexico City, Mexico, Juárez captured the WBC female super-bantamweight Silver title on 26 April 2024, beating South Africa's Matshidiso Mokebisi by technical knockout in round nine.

== Professional boxing record ==
73 fights	56 wins	13 losses
By knockout	20	3
By decision	36	10
Draws	4	

No.	Result	Record	Opponent	Type	Round, time	Date	Location	Notes
73	Win	56–13–4	(South Africa) Matshidiso Mokebisi	TKO	9 (10), 0:50	24 April 2024	Domo Corona del Hipodromo de las Americas, Mexico	For the vacant WBC female super-bantamweight Silver title
72	Loss	55–13–4	(Mexico) Mayeli Flores	UD	8	10 Jun 2023	(Mexico) Toyota Arena, Ontario, California, U.S.	
71	Loss	55–12–4	(Mexico) Yamileth Mercado	UD	10	29 Oct 2022	Mexico City, Mexico	For WBC female super bantamweight title
70	Loss	55–11–4	(Mexico) Jackie Nava	UD	10	30 Oct 2021	Auditorio Fausto Gutierrez Moreno, Tijuana, Mexico	For vacant WBC Diamond female super bantamweight title
69	Win	55–10–4	(Mexico) Alejandra Soto Martinez	RTD	4 (8), 2:00	21 May 2021	Arena Adolfo López Mateos, Tlalnepantla de Baz, Mexico	
68	Loss	54–10–4	(Mexico) Yulihan Luna	UD	10	31 Oct 2020	Grand Oasis Arena, Cancún, Mexico	Lost WBC female bantamweight title
67	Win	54–9–4	(Argentina) Carolina Duer	UD	10	12 Oct 2019	Centro de Convenciones, Fresnillo, Mexico	Retained WBC female bantamweight title
66	Win	53–9–4	(Mexico) Diana Fernandez	UD	10	15 Jun 2019	Plaza de la Mexicanidad, Ciudad Juárez, Mexico	Retained WBC female bantamweight title
65	Win	52–9–4	(Spain) Eva Naranjo	UD	10	2 Mar 2019	Gimnasio Solidaridad, Fresnillo, Mexico	Retained WBC female bantamweight title
64	Win	51–9–4	(Australia) Susie Ramadan	UD	10	27 Oct 2018	Auditorio Miguel Barragan, San Luis Potosí City, Mexico	Retained WBC female bantamweight title
63	Win	50–9–4	(Japan) Terumi Nuki	UD	10	11 Aug 2018	Arena Ciudad de Mexico, Mexico City, Mexico	Retained WBC female bantamweight title
62	Win	49–9–4	(Costa Rica) Carolina Arias	UD	10	28 Apr 2018	Gimnasio Miguel Hidalgo, Puebla, Mexico	Retained WBC female bantamweight title
61	Win	48–9–4	(Uruguay) Gabriela Bouvier	UD	10	17 Feb 2018	Arena Coliseo, Mexico City, Mexico	Retained WBC female bantamweight title
60	Win	47–9–4	(Germany) Alesia Graf	TKO	6 (10), 0:24	11 Nov 2017	Palenque INFORUM, Irapuato, Mexico	Retained WBC female bantamweight title
59	Win	46–9–4	(Japan) Terum Nuki	UD	10	8 Jul 2017	Auditorio Benito Juárez, Zapopan, Mexico	Retained WBC female bantamweight title
58	Win	45–9–4	(Zambia) Catherine Phiri	UD	10	1 Apr 2017	Zócalo, Mexico City, Mexico	Won WBC female bantamweight title
57	Win	44–9–4	(United Kingdom) Irma Garcia	MD	10	17 Dec 2016	Grand Oasis Arena, Cancún, Mexico	Retained WBC International female super flyweight title
56	Loss	43–9–4	(Argentina) Daniela Romina Bermúdez	UD	10	27 Aug 2016	Arena Coliseo, Mexico City, Mexico	
55	Win	43–8–4	(Japan) Tamao Ozawa	UD	10	14 May 2016	Arena Coliseo, Mexico City, Mexico	Retained WBC International female super flyweight title
54	Win	42–8–4	(United States) Noemi Bosques	UD	10	6 Feb 2016	Arena Coliseo, Mexico City, Mexico	Retained WBC International female super flyweight title
53	Draw	41–8–4	(Argentina) Vanesa Taborda	SD	10	10 Oct 2015	Auditorio Municipal de Cabo San Lucas, Los Cabos, Mexico	Retained WBC International female super flyweight title
52	Win	41–8–3	(Argentina) Vanesa Taborda	SD	10	11 Jul 2015	Centro Internacional Acapulco, Acapulco, Mexico	Retained WBC International female super flyweight title
51	Loss	40–8–3	(Japan) Naoko Fujioka	SD	10	14 Mar 2015	Auditorio Municipal, Naulcalpan, Mexico	
50	Win	40–7–3	(Argentina) Carla Romina Weiss	RTD	3 (10), 2:00	6 Sep 2014	Gimnasio Miguel Hidalgo, Puebla, Mexico	Retained WBC International female super flyweight title
49	Win	39–7–3	(United States) Melissa McMorrow	UD	10	22 Feb 2014	Gimnasio Miguel Hidalgo, Puebla, Mexico	Retained WBC International female super flyweight title
48	Win	38–7–3	(Thailand) Nimaphon Musika	UD	10	12 Oct 2013	Hard Rock Hotel, Puerto Vallarta, Mexico	Retained WBC International female super flyweight title
47	Win	37–7–3	(Japan) Riyo Togo	UD	10	13 Jul 2013	Centro de Espectáculos de la Feria de León, León, Mexico	Won vacant WBC International female super flyweight title
46	Loss	36–7–3	(Japan) Riyo Togo	TKO	1 (10), 1:58	27 Apr 2013	Arena México, Mexico City, Mexico	For vacant WBC International female super flyweight title
45	Win	36–6–3	(Japan) Tenkai Tsunami	UD	10	15 Dec 2012	Arena Coliseo, Guadalajara, Mexico	
44	Loss	35–6–3	(United States) Ava Knight	UD	10	13 Oct 2012	Palacio de los Deportes, Mexico City, Mexico	Lost WBC female flyweight title
43	Win	35–5–3	(Japan) Shindo Go	SD	10	14 Jul 2012	(United States) Citizens Business Bank Arena, Ontario, California, U.S.	Retained WBC female flyweight title
42	Win	34–5–3	(Mexico) Arely Muciño	SD	10	12 May 2012	Hotel Presidente Intercontinental, Mexico City, Mexico	Retained WBC female flyweight title
41	Win	33–5–3	(Russia) Anastasia Toktaulova	RTD	4 (10), 2:00	25 Feb 2012	Arena México, Mexico City, Mexico	Retained WBC female flyweight title
40	Win	32–5–3	(Mexico) Diana Gonzalez	PTS	10	10 Dec 2011	Gran Tlachco, Playa del Carmen, Mexico	Retained WBC female flyweight title
39	Win	31–5–3	(Uruguay) Daniela Bouvier	TKO	4 (10), 1:12	15 Oct 2011	Gimnasio Revolución, Calpulalpan, Mexico	Retained WBC female flyweight title
38	Win	30–5–3	(Japan) Asami Shikasho	UD	10	27 Aug 2011	Plaza de Toros, Huamantla, Mexico	Retained WBC female flyweight title
37	Win	29–5–3	(Uruguay) Gabriela Bouvier	TKO	7 (10), 1:58	21 May 2011	Centro de Espectáculos, Morelia, Mexico	Retained WBC female flyweight title
36	Win	28–5–3	(Italy) Simona Galassi	UD	10	11 Mar 2011	Jose Quervo Salon, Mexico City, Mexico	Won WBC female flyweight title
35	Win	27–5–3	(Mexico) Maribel Ramirez	KO	8 (10), 0:41	20 Nov 2010	Arena Monterrey, Monterrey, Mexico	Retained WBC interim female flyweight title
34	Win	26–5–3	(Mexico) Diana Gonzalez	KO	5 (10), 2:35	14 Aug 2010	Auditorio Luis Estrada Medina, Guasave, Mexico	Retained WBC interim female flyweight title
33	Win	25–5–3	(Mexico) Susana Vazquez	SD	10	22 May 2010	Auditorio Plaza Condesa, Mexico City, Mexico	
32	Win	24–5–3	(Panama) Abigail Villar	UD	10	6 Mar 2010	Auditorio Ernesto Rufo, Rosarito Beach, Mexico	Retained WBC interim female flyweight title
31	Win	23–5–3	(Mexico) Anahi Torres	UD	10	12 Dec 2009	Gimnasio INDEJ, Tepic, Mexico	Retained WBC interim female flyweight title
30	Win	22–5–3	(Mexico) Susana Vazquez	TKO	7 (10), 1:00	12 Sep 2009	Ensenada, Mexico	Retained WBC interim female flyweight title
29	Win	21–5–3	(Venezuela) Carolina Alvarez	TKO	8 (10)	25 Jul 2009	Avenida Revolución, Tijuana, Mexico	Retained WBC interim female flyweight title
28	Win	20–5–3	(Mexico) Irma Sánchez	UD	8	5 Jun 2009	Palenque Calle 2, Zapopan, Mexico	Won vacant WBC interim female flyweight title
27	Win	19–5–3	(Mexico) Anahi Torres	UD	10	28 Mar 2009	Deportivo Pino Suárez, Mexico City, Mexico	
26	Win	18–5–3	(Mexico) Esmeralda Moreno	UD	10	29 Nov 2008	Arena México, Mexico City, Mexico	Retained WBC International female flyweight title
25	Win	17–5–3	(United Kingdom) Suzannah Warner	UD	10	27 Sep 2008	Arena México, Mexico City, Mexico	Won WBC International female flyweight title
24	Win	16–5–3	(Mexico) Diana Gonzalez	UD	10	23 Aug 2008	El Foro, Tijuana, Mexico	
23	Win	15–5–3	(Mexico) Sandra Hernandez	TKO	10 (10), 1:54	17 Jul 2008	Roots Magic Club, Mexico City, Mexico	Won Mexican female flyweight title
22	Loss	14–5–3	(United States) Monica Lovato	SD	10	28 Jul 2007	(United States) Sky City Casino, Acoma Pueblo, New Mexico, U.S.	For vacant IBA female bantamweight title
21	Loss	14–4–3	(North Korea) Myung Ok Ryu	TKO	10 (10)	30 Mar 2005	Hotel Sunrise International, Shenyang, China	Lost IFBA super flyweight title
20	Win	14–3–3	(United States) Carla Witherspoon	TKO	2 (8), 1:41	25 Feb 2005	(United States) Las Trancas Hall, Maywood, California, U.S.	
19	Win	13–3–3	(South Korea) In Young Lee	SD	10	14 Nov 2004	University Gymnasium, Yongin, South Korea	Won vacant IFBA super flyweight title
18	Win	12–3–3	(United States) Yvonne Chavez	TKO	4 (6), 1:05	30 Apr 2004	(United States) Dodge Arena, Hidalgo, Texas, U.S.	
17	Win	11–3–3	(United States) Yvonne Chavez	UD	5	7 Oct 2003	(United States) Pechanga Resort & Casino, Temecula, Mexico	
16	Win	10–3–3	(United States) Lorri Aguilera	UD	4	18 Sep 2003	(United States) Santa Ana Stadium, Santa Ana, California, U.S.	
15	Draw	9–3–3	(United States) Elena Reid	PTS	6	28 Jun 2003	(United States) Celebrity Theatre, Phoenix, Arizona, U.S.	
14	Loss	9–3–2	(Mexico) Ana Maria Torres	UD	10	26 Jun 2002	Salon 21, Mexico City, Mexico	For vacant Mexican female bantamweight title
13	Win	9–2–2	(Mexico) Miriam Serrano	TKO	1 (4)	10 Apr 2002	Salon 21, Mexico City, Mexico	
12	Win	8–2–2	(United States) Jessica Treat	TKO	4 (4), 0:17	21 Jun 2001	(United States) Quiet Cannon, Montebello, California, U.S.	
11	Win	7–2–2	(United States) Sue Chase	TKO	3 (6), 0:50	11 May 2001	(United States) Quiet Cannon, Montebello, California, U.S.	
10	Win	6–2–2	(Mexico) Ivonne Munoz	PTS	4	21 Oct 2000	Salon 21, Mexico City, Mexico	
9	Win	5–2–2	(Mexico) Gloria Rios	UD	4	29 Jan 2000	Salina Cruz, Mexico	
8	Draw	4–2–2	(Mexico) Ana Maria Torres	SD	4	11 Dec 1999	Arena México, Mexico City, Mexico	
7	Win	4–2–1	(Mexico) Maribel Zamora	TKO	3 (4)	30 Oct 1999	Arena México, Mexico City, Mexico	
6	Draw	3–2–1	(Mexico) Ivonne Munoz	PTS	4	15 Sep 1999	Arena México, Mexico City, Mexico	
5	Win	3–2	(Mexico) Gloria Rios	TKO	3 (4)	21 Aug 1999	Arena México, Mexico City, Mexico	
4	Win	2–2	(Mexico) Maria Duran	PTS	4	31 Jul 1999	Cancún, Mexico	
3	Loss	1–2	(Mexico) Ana Maria Torres	SD	4	3 Jul 1999	Arena México, Mexico City, Mexico	
2	Loss	1–1	(Mexico) Maria Duran	TKO	3 (4)	21 Dec 1998	San Mateo Atenco, Mexico	
1	Win	1–0	(Mexico) Virginia Esparza	TKO	2 (4)	22 May 1998	Mexico City, Mexico	

Sporting positions
Regional boxing titles
Preceded by Sandra Hernandez	Mexican female flyweight champion 17 July 2008 – August 2008; Vacated	Vacant Title next held by Arely Muciño
Preceded by Suzannah Warner	WBC International female flyweight champion 27 September 2008 – December 2008; Vacated	Vacant Title next held by Sanae Jah
Vacant Title last held by Susana Vazquez	WBC International female super flyweight champion 13 July 2013 – August 2016; Vacated	Vacant Title next held by Estrella Valverde
Preceded by Irma Garcia	WBC International female bantamweight champion 17 December 2016 – January 2017; Vacated	Vacant Title next held by Ashley Brace
Minor world boxing titles
Vacant Title last held by Para Draine	IFBA super flyweight champion 14 November 2004 – 30 March 2005	Succeeded by Myung Ok Ryu
Major world boxing titles
New title	WBC female flyweight champion Interim title 5 June 2009 – 11 March 2011; Vacated	Vacant Title next held by Nana Yoshikawa
Vacant Title last held by Simona Galassi	WBC female flyweight champion 11 March 2011 – 13 October 2012	Succeeded by Ava Knight
Preceded by Catherine Phiri	WBC female bantamweight champion 1 April 2017 – 31 October 2020	Succeeded by Yulihan Luna
