= Boxing at the 2011 Pan American Games – Women's light welterweight =

Women's light welterweight at the 2011 Pan American Games
- Venue: Expo Guadalajara Arena
- Dates: October 22 – 29
- Competitors: 7 from 7 nations

Medalists
Gold medal	Kiria Tapia	Puerto Rico
Silver medal	Erika Cruz	Mexico
Bronze medal	Sandra Bizier	Canada
Bronze medal	Adela Peralta	Argentina

The women's light welterweight competition of boxing events at the 2011 Pan American Games in Guadalajara, Mexico, was held between October 22 and 29 at the Expo Guadalajara Arena. Light welterweights were limited to those boxers weighing less than or equal to 60 kilograms. This was the first time that women's boxing took place at the Pan American Games.

Like all Pan American boxing events, the competition was a straight single-elimination tournament. Both semifinal losers were awarded bronze medals, so no boxers competed again after their first loss. Bouts consisted of four rounds of two minutes each, with one-minute breaks. Punches scored only if the white area on the front of the glove made full contact with the front of the head or torso of the opponent. Five judges scored each bout; three of the judges had to signal a scoring punch within one second for the punch to score. The winner of the bout was the boxer who scored the most valid punches by the end of the bout.

== Schedule ==
All times are Central Standard Time (UTC-6).

Date	Time	Round
October 22, 2011	18:00	Quarterfinals
October 26, 2011	19:00	Semifinals
October 29, 2011	19:00	Final

== Results ==
=== Bracket ===
Quarterfinals
Adriana Araujo (BRA)	6
Erika Cruz (MEX)	16
Kiria Tapia (PUR)	+17
Quanitta Underwood (USA)	17
Adela Peralta (ARG)	22
Jhennifer Caceres (COL)	13

Semifinals
Sandra Bizier (CAN)	6
Erika Cruz (MEX)	12
Kiria Tapia (PUR)	RSC
Adela Peralta (ARG)

Finals
Erika Cruz (MEX)	12
Kiria Tapia (PUR)	22
