= Nazarena Romero =

Argentine boxer (born 1994)

Personal information
- Nickname: La Capricho ("The Caprice")
- Born: Natalia Nazarena Del Valle Romero; 23 May 1994 (age 32) Recreo, Catamarca, Argentina
- Height: 5 ft 4 in (163 cm)
- Weight: Bantamweight; Super bantamweight

Boxing career
- Reach: 63 in (160 cm)
- Stance: Orthodox

Boxing record
- Total fights: 18
- Wins: 15
- Win by KO: 8
- Losses: 1
- Draws: 2

Nazarena Romero (born 23 May 1994) is an Argentine professional boxer who has held the WBA interim female super bantamweight title since 2020.

== Professional career ==
Romero made her professional debut on 20 January 2018, scoring a four-round unanimous decision (UD) victory against Paola Farfan in Catamarca, Argentina.

After compiling a record of 6–0 (3 KOs), she defeated Marianela Ramírez via UD on 12 April 2019, capturing the vacant South American female bantamweight title at the Polideportivo Fray Mamerto Esquiú in Catamarca. Two judges scored the bout 98–92 and the third scored it 97–95.

Three fights later she faced Laura Griffa for the vacant FAB and South American female super bantamweight titles on 28 December 2019, at the Club Independiente in Zárate, Argentina. Romero emerged victorious, capturing the vacant titles via UD with the judges' scorecards reading 100–90, 99–91 and 98–92.

Her next fight was scheduled to take place on 20 March 2020, against Julieta Cardoza for the vacant WBA interim female super bantamweight title. However, the event was subsequently postponed due to the COVID-19 pandemic. The bout was eventually rescheduled for 5 December at the Club de Ajedrez in La Calera, Argentina. After Romero unleashed a barrage of punches in the second round, referee Gerardo Poggi stepped in to call a halt to the contest as Cardoza was on her way down to the canvas, awarding Romero her first world title via second-round technical knockout (TKO).

== Professional boxing record ==
18 fights	15 wins	1 loss
By knockout	8	0
By decision	7	1
Draws	2	

No.	Result	Record	Opponent	Type	Round, time	Date	Location	Notes
18	Win	15–1–2	Maria Salinas	UD	8	30 May 2026	County Coliseum, El Paso, Texas, U.S	
17	Loss	14–1–2	Mayelli Flores	SD	10	10 May 2025	Silver Spurs Arena, Kissimmee, Florida, U.S.	Lost WBA super-bantamweight title
16	Win	14–0–2	Paulette Valenzuela Cuesta	TKO	10 (10), 0:30	24 Aug 2024	Casino Buenos Aires, Buenos Aires, Argentina	Won vacant WBA super-bantamweight title
15	Draw	13–0–2	Erika Cruz	SD	10	11 May 2024	Palenque de la Feria, Aguascalientes, Mexico	For WBA super-bantamweight title
14	Draw	13–0–1	Mayerlin Rivas	TD	5 (10), 1:25	10 Jun 2023	Casino Buenos Aires, Buenos Aires, Argentina	For WBA super-bantamweight title
13	Win	13–0	Julieta Cardoza	TKO	3 (10), 1:02	29 Apr 2023	Hotel Quinto Centenario, Córdoba, Argentina	Won vacant WBA Latin American super-bantamweight title
12	Win	12–0	Paola Ibarra	TKO	1 (8), 0:25	19 Nov 2022	Club Albatros, Montevideo, Uruguay	
11	Win	11–0	Julieta Cardoza	TKO	2 (10), 1:38	5 Dec 2020	Club de Ajedrez, La Calera, Argentina	Won interim WBA super-bantamweight title
10	Win	10–0	Laura Soledad Griffa	UD	10	28 Dec 2019	Club Independiente, Zárate, Argentina	Won vacant FAB and South American super-bantamweight titles
9	Win	9–0	Rosa Maria Caraballo	UD	6	11 Oct 2019	Polideportivo Fray Mamerto Esquiú, Catamarca, Argentina	
8	Win	8–0	Valeria Jesica Almirón	TKO	1 (6)	28 Jun 2019	Club Unión Sportiva, Recreo, Argentina	
7	Win	7–0	Marinela Soledad Ramirez	UD	10	12 Apr 2019	Polideportivo Fray Mamerto Esquiú, Catamarca, Argentina	Won vacant South American bantamweight title
6	Win	6–0	Rosa Maria Caraballo	UD	6	29 Mar 2019	Polideportivo Universidad Tecnológica Nacional, Córdoba, Argentina	
5	Win	5–0	Elizabeth Britos	TKO	4 (6)	19 Oct 2018	Club Unión Sportiva, Recreo, Argentina	
4	Win	4–0	Eliana Yamila Cuello	TKO	2 (6)	14 Sep 2018	Club Unión Social y Deportivo, Cruz Alta, Argentina	
3	Win	3–0	Marianela Soledad Ramirez	UD	6	3 Aug 2018	Centro Vecinal Barrio Yofre, Córdoba, Argentina	
2	Win	2–0	Elizabeth Britos	KO	1 (4)	22 Jun 2018	Sociedad General Belgrano, Córdoba, Argentina	
1	Win	1–0	Paola Farfan	UD	4	20 Jan 2018	Polideportivo Fray Mamerto Esquiú, Catamarca, Argentina	

== See also ==
- List of female boxers

Sporting positions
Regional boxing titles
Vacant Title last held by Jorgelina Guanini	South American bantamweight champion 12 April 2019 – June 2019; Vacated	Vacant Title next held by Florencia Ayelen Juarez
Vacant Title last held by Laura Soledad Griffa	FAB super-bantamweight champion 28 December 2019 – December 2020; Won interim title	Vacant Title next held by Juliana Vanesa Basualdo
Vacant Title last held by Laura Soledad Griffa	South American super-bantamweight champion 28 December 2019 – December 2020; Won interim title	Vacant Title next held by Marianela Soledad Ramirez
New title	WBA Latin American super-bantamweight champion 19 November 2022 – 24 August 2024; Won world title	Vacant
World boxing titles
Vacant Title last held by Liliana Palmera	WBA super-bantamweight champion Interim title 5 December 2020 – August 2020; Vacated title due to pregnancy	Vacant
Vacant Title last held by Erika Cruz	WBA super-bantamweight champion 24 August 2024 – 10 May 2025	Succeeded by Mayelli Flores
