= Erika Cruz =

Mexican female boxer

Personal information
- Nickname: Dinamita
- Nationality: Mexican
- Born: Erika Rosalba Cruz Hernández; 3 May 1990 (age 36) Mexico City, Mexico
- Height: 168 cm (5 ft 6 in)
- Weight: Featherweight, Super-bantamweight

Boxing career
- Reach: 163 cm (64 in)
- Stance: Southpaw

Boxing record
- Total fights: 21
- Wins: 18
- Win by KO: 3
- Losses: 2
- Draws: 1
Medal record
Pan American Games
Silver medal – second place	2011 Guadalajara	Light welterweight

Erika Rosalba Cruz Hernández (born 3 May 1990) is a Mexican professional boxer. She won the WBA female super-bantamweight World title with a majority decision success over Mayerlin Rivas on 18 November 2023. Previously Cruz held the WBA female featherweight World title from 22 April 2021 until 4 February 2023.

== Professional boxing record ==
21 fights	18 wins	2 losses
By knockout	4	0
By decision	14	2
Draws	1	

No.	Result	Record	Opponent	Type	Round, time	Date	Location	Notes
22	—N/a	—N/a	(Puerto Rico) Amanda Serrano	—N/a	– (10)	26 Jan 2026	Roberto Clemente Coliseum, San Juan, Puerto Rico	For WBO female featherweight title
21	Win	18–2–1	(Mexico) Maricruz Rodríguez González	TKO	6 (8), 0:23	16 May 2025	Teatro Parque Interlomas, Naucalpan, Mexico	
20	Draw	17–2–1	(Argentina) Nazarena Romero	SD	10	11 May 2024	Palenque de la Feria, Aguascalientes, Mexico	Retained WBA female super bantamweight title
19	Win	17–2	(Venezuela) Mayerlin Rivas	MD	10	18 Nov 2023	(United States) YouTube Theater, Inglewood, California, U.S.	Won WBA female super bantamweight title
18	Win	16–2	(United States) Melissa Oddessa Parker	UD	10	15 Sep 2023	Auditorio Fausto Gutierrez Moreno, Tijuana, Mexico	
17	Loss	15–2	(Puerto Rico) Amanda Serrano	UD	10	4 Feb 2023	(United States) Hulu Theater, New York City, New York, U.S.	Lost WBA female featherweight title; For WBC, IBF, WBO, IBO & The Ring female featherweight titles;
16	Win	15–1	(Canada) Jelena Mrdjenovich	UD	10	3 Sep 2022	Centro de Usos Multiples, Hermosillo, Mexico	Retained WBA female featherweight title
15	Win	14–1	(Mexico) Melissa Esquivel	SD	10	26 Nov 2021	Centro Internacional de Convenciones, Puerto Vallarta, Mexico	Retained WBA female featherweight title
14	Win	13–1	(Canada) Jelena Mrdjenovich	TD	7 (10), 0:25	22 Apr 2021	United States Military Academy, West Point, New York, U.S.	Won WBA female featherweight title; Unanimous TD: Mrdjenovich unable to continue after an accidental head clash
13	Win	12–1	(Mexico) Leticia Uribe	UD	8	20 Feb 2021	Big Punch Arena, Tijuana, Mexico	
12	Win	11–1	(Mexico) Jocelyn Morales Torres	UD	8	21 Sep 2019	Casa de la Cultura Popular, Mexico City, Mexico	
11	Win	10–1	(Italy) Vissia Trovato	UD	10	8 Mar 2019	Superstudio, Milan, Italy	Won vacant WBC Silver female featherweight title
10	Win	9–1	(Mexico) Magaly Rodríguez	MD	6	27 Oct 2018	Domo del Parque San Rafael, Guadalajara, Mexico	
9	Win	8–1	(Mexico) Karina Hernández Boiso	TD	4 (8)	29 Jun 2018	Deportivo Lázaro Cardenas, Mexico City, Mexico	Unanimous TD: Cruz unable to continue after an accidental head clash
8	Win	7–1	(Mexico) Karla Ramos Zamora	UD	8	16 Mar 2018	Deportivo Lázaro Cardenas, Mexico City, Mexico	
7	Win	6–1	(Mexico) Maria Elena Villalobos	TKO	3 (6), 1:42	20 Oct 2017	Salon Fascinacion, Mexico City, Mexico	
6	Win	5–1	(Mexico) Aidé Rodríguez	TKO	2 (4), 1:26	8 Jul 2017	Auditorio Benito Juárez, Zapopan, Mexico	
5	Win	4–1	(Mexico) Virgen Adriana Tapia	UD	6	12 May 2017	Auditorio Municipal, Los Reyes Acaquilpan, Mexico	
4	Win	3–1	(Mexico) Guadalupe Lincer Ortiz	MD	4	8 Oct 2016	Explanada Delegacion Cuauhtemoc, Mexico City, Mexico	
3	Win	2–1	(Mexico) Guadalupe Zi Jaimes	TKO	1 (4), 0:56	26 Aug 2016	Salón Ponsá, Mexico City, Mexico	
2	Loss	1–1	(Mexico) Alondra González Flores	MD	4	25 Jun 2016	Cholula, Mexico	
1	Win	1–0	(Mexico) Diana Gabriela Ojeda Crespo	UD	4	6 Mar 2016	Mercado Agricola Oriental, Mexico City, Mexico	

Sporting positions
World boxing titles
Preceded by Mayerlin Rivas	WBA female light-featherweight champion 18 November 2023 – August 2024	Vacant Title next held by Nazarena Romero
Vacant Title last held by Lucie Sedláčková	WBC female featherweight champion Silver title 8 March 2019 – 2020	Vacant Title next held by Sabrina Maribel Pérez
Preceded by Jelena Mrdjenovich	WBA female featherweight champion 22 April 2021 – 4 February 2023	Succeeded by Amanda Serrano
