= Ellie Scotney =

English boxer (born 1998)

Personal information
- Born: 16 March 1998 (age 28) Lewisham, London, England
- Height: 5 ft 4 in (163 cm)
- Weight: Super-bantamweight, Featherweight

Boxing career
- Stance: Orthodox

Boxing record
- Total fights: 12
- Wins: 12
- Win by KO: 0

Ellie Scotney (born 16 March 1998) is an English professional boxer. She is a former undisputed female super-bantamweight world champion.

== Professional career ==
In February 2020, it was announced that Scotney had signed a long-term promotional contract with Eddie Hearn's Matchroom Sport. Her debut was scheduled for 28 March at The O2 Arena, London, and was to be televised live on Sky Sports in the UK and streamed on DAZN in the US, as part of the undercard for Josh Kelly vs. David Avanesyan. After the event was cancelled due to the COVID-19 pandemic, Scotney made her debut on 17 October against Bec Connolly. Scotney scored a knockdown in the third round en route to a six-round points decision (PTS) victory, with referee Michael Alexander scoring the bout 60–53.

Her second fight was on the undercard of Lawrence Okolie vs. Krzysztof Głowacki at The SSE Arena in London. She defeated Mailys Gangloff PTS over six rounds, with referee Marcus McDonnell scoring the bout 59–55.

=== World titles ===
On June 10, 2023, in London, England, Scotney defeated Cherneka Johnson by unanimous decision to become a new IBF super bantamweight champion.

On September 30, 2023, in London, England, Scotney successfully defended IBF super bantamweight championship by unanimous decision against Laura Soledad Griffa.

On April 13, 2024, in Manchester, England, Scotney secured a unanimous decision win against Ségolène Lefebvre to become unified super-bantamweight champion by retaining her IBF title and adding her French opponent's WBO championship and the vacant Ring Magazine belt to her collection.

She was scheduled to defend her titles against Mea Motu at the Co-op Live Arena in Manchester on 26 October 2024, but withdrew from the fight due to injury. The fight was rearranged for 26 January 2025 at Motorpoint Arena, Nottingham, with Scotney retaining her titles by unanimous decision.

=== Signing with Most Valuable Promotions ===
On 9 April 2025, it was announced that Scotney had signed with Most Valuable Promotions and would be fighting on the undercard of the Amanda Serrano vs. Katie Taylor trilogy bout.

=== IBF, WBC and WBO super bantamweight championship unification ===
Holding the unified IBF and WBO super bantamweight titles, Scotney faced WBC 122-pound champion Yamileth Mercado in a championship unification at Madison Square Garden in New York City, New York on 11 July 2025. She won by unanimous decision.

=== Undisputed super bantamweight championship ===
Holding the IBF, WBC, and WBO female super bantamweight titles, Scotney was scheduled to face WBA female champion Mayelli Flores for the undisputed title on 14 November 2025, in Miami, Florida, USA, on the undercard of Jake Paul vs. Gervonta Davis. However, the fight was cancelled when Scotney suffered an injury during training camp. On 4 February 2026, it was announced that the bout had been rearranged to take place at Olympia London in England on 5 April 2026. Scotney won by unanimous decision.

On 12 May 2026, Scotney vacated all her titles and announced she was moving up in weight divisions to featherweight. She was scheduled to challenge WBC female featherweight champion Tiara Brown at College Park Center in Arlington, Texas, USA, on 8 November 2026. However, the fight was cancelled when Scotney withdrew after suffering an injury just over three weeks before it was due to take place.

== Professional boxing record ==
12 fights	12 wins	0 losses
By decision	12	0

No.	Result	Record	Opponent	Type	Round, time	Date	Location	Notes
12	Win	12–0	Mayelli Flores	UD	10	5 Apr 2026	Olympia, London, England	Retained WBC, IBF, WBO & The Ring female super bantamweight titles; Won WBA female super-bantamweight title
11	Win	11–0	Yamileth Mercado	UD	10	11 Jul 2025	Madison Square Garden, New York City, New York, US	Retained IBF, WBO & The Ring female super bantamweight titles Won WBC female super bantamweight title
10	Win	10–0	Mea Motu	UD	10	26 Jan 2025	Motorpoint Arena, Nottingham, England	Retained IBF, WBO & The Ring female super bantamweight titles
9	Win	9–0	Ségolène Lefebvre	UD	10	13 Apr 2024	Manchester Arena, Manchester, England	Retained IBF female super bantamweight title Won WBO & vacant The Ring female super bantamweight titles
8	Win	8–0	Laura Soledad Griffa	UD	10	30 Sep 2023	Wembley Arena, London, England	Retained IBF female super bantamweight title
7	Win	7–0	Cherneka Johnson	UD	10	10 Jun 2023	Wembley Arena, London, England	Won IBF female super bantamweight title
6	Win	6–0	Mary Romero	UD	10	29 Oct 2022	Wembley Arena, London, England	Won European female super bantamweight title
5	Win	5–0	María Cecilia Román	UD	10	21 May 2022	The O2 Arena, London, England	Retained WBA Inter-Continental super bantamweight title
4	Win	4–0	Jorgelina Guanini	UD	10	12 Feb 2022	Alexandra Palace, Muswell Hill, England	Won vacant WBA Inter-Continental super bantamweight title
3	Win	3–0	Eva Cantos	PTS	8	30 Oct 2021	The O2 Arena, London, England	
2	Win	2–0	Mailys Gangloff	PTS	6	20 Mar 2021	The SSE Arena, London, England	
1	Win	1–0	Bec Connolly	PTS	6	17 Oct 2020	East of England Arena, Peterborough, England	

== See also ==
- List of female boxers

Sporting positions
Regional boxing titles
New title	WBA Inter-Continental female super-bantamweight champion February 12, 2022 – June 10, 2023; Won world title	Vacant
Preceded by Mary Romero	European female super-bantamweight champion October 29, 2022 – 2023; Vacated	Vacant Title next held by Laura Grzyb
World boxing titles
Preceded by Cherneka Johnson	IBF female super-bantamweight champion June 10, 2023 – May 12, 2026; Vacated	Vacant
Preceded by Ségolène Lefebvre	WBO female super-bantamweight champion April 13, 2024 – May 12, 2026; Vacated	Vacant
Inaugural champion	The Ring female super-bantamweight champion April 13, 2024 – May 12, 2026; Vacated	Vacant
Preceded by Yamileth Mercado	WBC female super-bantamweight champion July 11, 2025 – May 12, 2026; Vacated	Vacant
Preceded by Mayelli Flores	WBA female super-bantamweight champion April 5, 2026 – May 12, 2026; Vacated	Vacant
Inaugural champion	Undisputed female super-bantamweight champion April 5, 2026 – May 12, 2026	Vacant
