= Mayerlin Rivas =

Venezuelan boxer (born 1987)

- Born: 5 December 1987 (age 38); Maracaibo, Venezuela
- Nickname: La Monita
- Height: 165 cm (5 ft 5 in)
- Division: Bantamweight; Super bantamweight

Professional boxing record
- Total: 27
- Wins: 17
- By knockout: 11
- Losses: 7
- Draws: 3

Mixed martial arts record
- Total: 3
- Wins: 2
- By decision: 1
- Unknown: 1
- Losses: 1
- By submission: 1

Other information
- Mixed martial arts record from Sherdog
- Boxing Record from BoxRec Last updated on: 16 October 2026

Mayerlin de los Ángeles Rivas Pomares (born 5 December 1987) is a Venezuelan professional boxer. Nicknamed La Monita, she is a former world champion in two weight classes, having held the World Boxing Association (WBA) female bantamweight title from 2015 to 2020 and the WBA female super bantamweight title from 2020 to 2023. She unsuccessfully challenged twice for bantamweight titles in 2012 and once for the International Boxing Federation (IBF) female super bantamweight title in 2018.

Rivas made her professional debut in 2007, won the WBA interim bantamweight title in 2014, and made four defences of the full title before moving up in weight. She won the vacant WBA super bantamweight title in 2020, retained it twice, and lost it by majority decision in November 2023. She has also competed professionally in mixed martial arts.

== Early life and background ==
Mayerlin de los Ángeles Rivas Pomares was born in Maracaibo, Zulia, Venezuela, on 5 December 1987. Her father boxed, while her uncle, Breilor Terán, was a professional boxer. In a 2023 interview, she recalled becoming interested in boxing at about the age of 15 after watching her uncle and cousin training. Her first trainers were Benito Mendoza and, later, Ortiz. She also competed in wushu, winning two national championships. Rivas recalled that she won all nine of her amateur boxing bouts and a national title at 60 kg.

After moving to Caracas to pursue her boxing career, Rivas experienced financial hardship; she recalled that she sometimes lacked food and slept on the floor. She credited promoter Rafael Morón and trainer Jorge Zerpa with helping her establish her career.

== Professional boxing career ==
=== Early career ===
Rivas made her professional debut on 8 October 2007 at the Teatro Roxi in Maracaibo, defeating Anys Cedillo by a third-round technical knockout. She won her first five professional bouts before suffering her first defeat, a six-round unanimous decision loss to Sandy Tsagouris in Hamilton, Ontario, in November 2009.

In July 2010, Rivas challenged Zulina Muñoz for her World Boxing Council (WBC) Youth female bantamweight title in Mexico City, and the ten-round contest ended in a majority draw. Rivas put Muñoz on the canvas in the fifth, sixth and seventh rounds; Dee Williams of WBAN considered the first knockdown to have come more from a push than a punch. Rivas faded over the last three rounds, and Muñoz, aided by a ninth-round point deduction against Rivas, secured the draw. Williams remarked that at times the bout "resembled a stand-up wrestling match more than sweet science".

On 31 March 2012, Rivas challenged Daniela Romina Bermúdez for the World Boxing Association (WBA) interim female bantamweight title at Club Atlético Talleres in Villa Gobernador Gálvez, Argentina. The interim title was contested because the regular champion, Sabrina Pérez, had requested a leave of absence for health reasons, and the winner was due to face Pérez to unify the titles. La Capital reported that Bermúdez controlled the opening two rounds, but Rivas began countering effectively from the third, making the contest closely fought. Bermúdez won by majority decision, with scores of 96–94, 96–95 and 95–95.

Rivas challenged then-IBF champion Yazmín Rivas for the International Boxing Federation (IBF) female bantamweight title in Zamora, Mexico, on 3 November 2012. According to El Independiente de Zamora, Yazmín Rivas pressed forward throughout the contest, landing overhand rights and seeking exchanges at close range, while Mayerlin Rivas boxed defensively and clinched when forced into close quarters. Yazmín Rivas won by unanimous decision, with scores of 100–89, 97–92 and 99–90.

=== WBA bantamweight champion ===
In August 2014, Rivas won the vacant WBA interim female bantamweight title with a ninth-round technical knockout of Arely Valente at the José Beracasa Gymnasium in Caracas. This was just Rivas's second fight since 2012. Elisinio Castillo of BoxingScene reported that Rivas controlled the contest with her punching power and technique, prompting the referee to stop the bout as Valente came under sustained punishment in the ninth round.

Rivas, as the interim champion, defeated Calixta Silgado by a fifth-round stoppage at the Polideportivo José María Vargas in La Guaira on 16 January 2015 to win the WBA female bantamweight title. The WBA report by Hilmar Rojas Erazo said that Rivas repeatedly hurt Silgado with body punches before dropping her with a right–left combination to the body in the fifth round, after which Silgado did not rise to continue. The victory made her the second Venezuelan woman to win a WBA (Regular) title, after Ogleidis Suárez.

Rivas made her first WBA female bantamweight title defence against Sayda Mosquera in La Guaira on 27 June 2015, winning by technical knockout at 1:35 in the fourth round. After a competitive opening three rounds, Rivas landed an uppercut that left Mosquera unable to defend herself against the ropes, prompting the referee to stop the bout.

She retained the title against Galina Ivanova by unanimous decision (98–93, 99–91, 98–93) at the Poliedro de Caracas on 10 October 2015. Rojas Erazo's reported for the WBA that Rivas kept a comfortable distance to avoid Ivanova's guard, while Ivanova tried to fight at close quarters to negate the champion's reach.

Rivas retained the title with a split decision victory over Melania Sorroche in La Guaira on 18 June 2016, with two judges scoring 97–92 and 96–93 for Rivas and the third 95–94 for Sorroche. The bout headlined La Batalla de Campeonas, a women's card that Guinness World Records recognised for featuring the most female world title fights on a single card (four). According to Espabox, both boxers fought fiercely from the start, with Sorroche pressing forward and Rivas countering effectively and knocking her down in the ninth round, which may have been decisive.

In preparation for her next title defence, Rivas fought María Andrea Miranda in Medellín, Colombia in September 2017, and won by a first-round knockout. On 1 November, she defended the title against Dayana Cordero at La Macarena in Medellín, retaining it after a majority draw. Both boxers disputed the verdict, with Rivas maintaining that she had won and calling for a rematch. Kid Hersh reported for the WBA that Rivas controlled the early rounds with her jab and distance boxing, but Cordero increased the pressure through the middle rounds and hurt her late in the contest.

Rivas moved to Argentina in February 2018, after Yesica Bopp, whom she had met at La Batalla de Campeonas in 2016 and spoke with again at the WBA convention in Medellín, offered to help with accommodation and her boxing career. She relocated with her partner and trained under Juan Ledesma and later Rodrigo Calabrese. Rivas said that Argentina offered very active women's boxing and the chance to spar with other world champions, and that she initially struggled to adapt to the more demanding training. She also said that she had sometimes had to challenge opponents through social media to secure fights, and argued that greater promotional and television support would help women's boxing move toward equal opportunities with the men's sport.

=== WBA super bantamweight champion ===
Rivas challenged reigning IBF champion Marcela Acuña for the female super bantamweight title at the Estadio Delmi in Salta, Argentina, on 19 October 2018. Acuña retained the title by split decision, with two judges scoring the contest 96–94 and 97–93 in her favour and the third scoring it 96–94 for Rivas.

On 7 February 2020, Rivas defeated the previously unbeaten Laura Ledezma by unanimous decision at the Roberto Durán Arena in Panama City to win the vacant WBA female super bantamweight title, making her a world champion in a second weight class. WBA records list her as its bantamweight champion until January 2020, having made four successful defences, and as its super bantamweight champion from February 2020.

During a visit to Maracaibo in December 2021, Rivas presented her title at the city's basilica in thanksgiving to Our Lady of Chiquinquirá, locally known as La Chinita, fulfilling a promise she had made before winning her second world title. Rivas went more than two years from the Ledezma fight without another bout. The COVID-19 pandemic had prevented proposed unification fights.

In March 2022, Rivas signed a multi-fight promotional agreement with Eddie Hearn's Matchroom Boxing. She said that she had waited 15 years for such an opportunity and had been unable to defend her title since winning it in 2020. She said that she hoped to unify the super bantamweight titles and become undisputed, and also expressed interest in fighting at featherweight.

Rivas returned to the ring on 10 June 2022 to defend her title against Karina Fernández at the Domo Alcalde in Guadalajara, Mexico. She knocked Fernández down in the opening round and continued landing combinations in the second and third. At the beginning of the fourth round, the referee referred Fernández for a medical examination, after which the doctor advised that the bout be stopped.

Rivas's next fight was a year later; she defended the title against Nazarena Romero at the Casino Buenos Aires in Argentina, with the contest ending in a technical draw. Romero knocked Rivas down in the third round, but a clash of heads in the fifth opened a cut above Romero's left eye and led to the fight being stopped on medical advice. It was judged to be a split technical draw, meaning that Rivas retained her title.

Rivas lost the title to former WBA featherweight champion Erika Cruz at the YouTube Theater in Inglewood, California, on 18 November 2023. Cruz won the ten-round contest by majority decision, with scores of 98–92, 97–93 and 95–95. Rivas disputed the verdict in an Instagram post and asked the WBA to order an immediate rematch.

On 4 October 2024, Rivas lost by unanimous decision to Mikiah Kreps at the Seneca Niagara Casino & Hotel in Niagara Falls, New York. Her next bout was in June 2026; she lost by unanimous decision to Shannel Butler at GLC Live at 20 Monroe in Grand Rapids, Michigan. The judges scored the bout 79–73, 80–72 and 79–73 for Butler.

== Mixed martial arts career ==
Rivas participated in three mixed martial arts bouts from 2012 to 2014, winning two. She defeated Stephanie Velandia at Striker Fighting Championship 3 on 30 November 2012 and Daiana Torquato by unanimous decision at XFC International 1 on 8 February 2014. Her third bout ended in a loss to Silvana Gómez Juárez by an armbar submission in the third round at XFC International 5, held on 7 June 2014.

== Professional boxing record ==
27 fights	17 wins	7 losses
By knockout	11	0
By decision	6	7
Draws	3	

Professional boxing record
No.	Result	Record	Opponent	Type	Round, time	Date	Location	Notes	Ref.
27	Loss	17–7–3	Shannel Butler (USA)	UD	8	14 June 2026	GLC Live at 20 Monroe, Grand Rapids, Michigan, United States		
26	Loss	17–6–3	Mikiah Kreps (USA)	UD	8	4 October 2024	Seneca Niagara Casino & Hotel, Niagara Falls, New York, United States		
25	Loss	17–5–3	Erika Cruz (MEX)	MD	10	18 November 2023	YouTube Theater (USA), Inglewood, California, United States	Lost WBA female super bantamweight title	
24	Draw	17–4–3	Nazarena Romero (ARG)	TD	5 (10)	10 June 2023	Casino Buenos Aires, Buenos Aires, Argentina	Retained WBA female super bantamweight title; split technical draw: opponent unable to continue from an accidental head clash	
23	Win	17–4–2	Karina Fernández (MEX)	TKO	4 (10), 0:01	10 June 2022	Domo Alcalde, Guadalajara, Mexico	Retained WBA female super bantamweight title	
22	Win	16–4–2	Laura Ledezma (PAN)	UD	10	7 February 2020	Roberto Durán Arena (PAN), Panama City, Panama	Won vacant WBA female super bantamweight title	
21	Loss	15–4–2	Marcela Acuña (ARG)	SD	10	19 October 2018	Estadio Delmi, Salta, Argentina	For IBF female super bantamweight title	
20	Draw	15–3–2	Dayana Cordero (COL)	MD	10	1 November 2017	La Macarena, Medellín, Colombia	Retained WBA female bantamweight title	
19	Win	15–3–1	María Andrea Miranda (COL)	KO	1 (8)	23 September 2017	Centro Comercial El Tesoro, Medellín, Colombia		
18	Win	14–3–1	Melania Sorroche (ESP)	SD	10	18 June 2016	Polideportivo José María Vargas, La Guaira, Venezuela	Retained WBA female bantamweight title	
17	Win	13–3–1	Galina Koleva Ivanova (BUL)	UD	10	10 October 2015	Poliedro de Caracas (VEN), Caracas, Venezuela	Retained WBA female bantamweight title	
16	Win	12–3–1	Sayda Mosquera (PAN)	TKO	4 (10), 1:35	27 June 2015	Polideportivo José María Vargas, La Guaira, Venezuela	Retained WBA female bantamweight title	
15	Win	11–3–1	Calixta Silgado (COL)	TKO	5	16 January 2015	Polideportivo José María Vargas, La Guaira, Venezuela	Won WBA female bantamweight title	
14	Win	10–3–1	Arely Valente (MEX)	TKO	9 (10)	30 August 2014	Gimnasio José Beracasa, Caracas, Venezuela	Won vacant WBA interim female bantamweight title	
13	Win	9–3–1	Liliana Martínez (DOM)	UD	6	10 May 2014	Polideportivo José María Vargas, La Guaira, Venezuela		
12	Loss	8–3–1	Yazmín Rivas (MEX)	UD	10	3 November 2012	Unidad Deportiva El Chamizal, Zamora, Michoacán, Mexico	For IBF female bantamweight title	
11	Win	8–2–1	Anys Cedillo (VEN)	UD		14 July 2012	Polideportivo José María Vargas, La Guaira, Venezuela		
10	Loss	7–2–1	Daniela Romina Bermúdez (ARG)	MD	10	31 March 2012	Club Atlético Talleres, Villa Gobernador Gálvez, Argentina	For WBA interim female bantamweight title	
9	Win	7–1–1	Francia Pérez (COL)	KO	6 (8), 0:31	19 January 2011	Coliseo Kid Dumlop, Santa Marta, Colombia		
8	Draw	6–1–1	Zulina Muñoz (MEX)	MD	10	9 July 2010	Gran Forúm, Mexico City, Mexico	For WBC Youth female bantamweight title	
7	Win	6–1	Alejandra Ramírez (COL)	TKO	4 (6), 1:01	30 April 2010	Coliseo Gaira, Santa Marta, Colombia		
6	Loss	5–1	Sandy Tsagouris (CAN)	UD	6	14 November 2009	Hamilton Convention Centre, Hamilton, Ontario, Canada		
5	Win	5–0	Stefany Cassiani (COL)	TKO	2 (6), 2:25	17 April 2009	Centro Recreacional Las Vegas, Barranquilla, Colombia		
4	Win	4–0	Alejandra Ariza (COL)	KO	1 (6), 2:29	Feb 2009	Coliseo Gaira, Santa Marta, Colombia		
3	Win	3–0	Anys Cedillo (VEN)	UD	6	23 August 2008	Centro Bético Croes, Santa Cruz, Aruba		
2	Win	2–0	Diana Gaspar (COL)	TKO	2 (4), 0:38	20 June 2008	Centro Recreacional Las Vegas, Barranquilla, Colombia		
1	Win	1–0	Anys Cedillo (VEN)	TKO	3	8 October 2007	Teatro Roxi, Maracaibo, Venezuela		

== Mixed martial arts record ==
Details of Rivas's mixed martial arts career are shown below.

Professional record breakdown
3 matches	2 wins	1 loss
By submission	0	1
By decision	1	0
Unknown	1	0

Res.	Record	Opponent	Method	Event	Date	Round	Time	Location	Notes
Loss	2–1	Silvana Gómez Juárez	Submission (armbar)	XFC International 5	June 7, 2014	3	2:55	São Paulo, Brazil	
Win	2–0	Daiana Torquato	Decision (unanimous)	XFC International 1	February 8, 2014	3	5:00	Osasco, Brazil	
Win	1–0	Stephanie Velandia Galindo	n/a	Striker Fighting Championship 3	30 November 2012	1	3:00	Barranquilla, Colombia	
