= Alesia Graf =

German boxer (1980–2024)

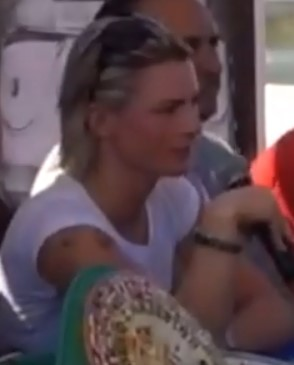
- Graf in 2017

Personal information
- Nickname: The Tigress
- Nationality: German
- Born: Alesia-Tamara Klimovich (Алеся-Тамара Клімовіч); 14 October 1980 Gomel, Belarusian SSR, USSR
- Died: March 2024 (aged 43)
- Height: 5 ft 7 in (170 cm)
- Weight: Super-flyweight; Bantamweight; Super-bantamweight

Boxing career
- Reach: 63 in (160 cm)
- Stance: Orthodox

Boxing record
- Total fights: 37
- Wins: 29
- Win by KO: 13
- Losses: 8

Alesia Graf (born Alesia-Tamara Klimovich; 14 October 1980 – March 2024) was a Belarusian-born German professional boxer who held the WIBF super-flyweight title from 2008 to 2009. She also challenged for the WBC female super-flyweight title twice between 2010 and 2014; the WBC female bantamweight title twice between 2014 and 2017; and the WBO female junior-featherweight title in 2019.

Graf boxed from 2001. She trained with Heinz Schultz in Stuttgart and with Thorsten Schmitz in Hamburg. Her professional debut was on 14 February 2004.

== Personal life ==
Graf was born in Gomel, Belarus, and was separated from her mother and sister when she was 6 and reunited with them in 2014.

Graf's death at the age of 43 was announced on 25 March 2024.
