= Ava Knight =

American boxer and mixed martial arts fighter

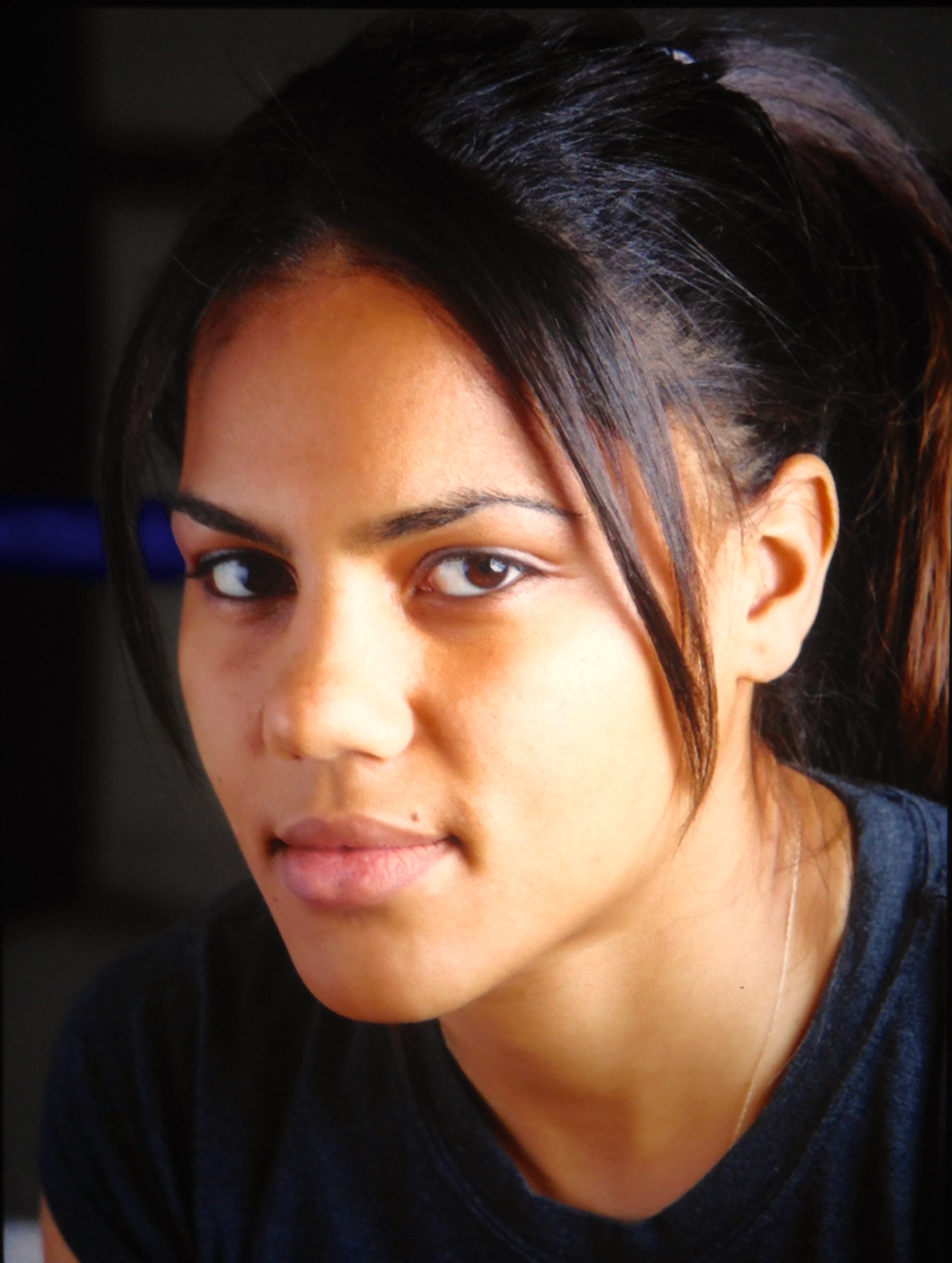
- Knight in 2018
- Born: Ava Michelle Knight-Salicka; August 15, 1988 (age 38); Chico, California, U.S.
- Other names: Lady of Boxing
- Height: 165 cm (5 ft 5 in)
- Division: Light-flyweight; Flyweight; Super-flyweight; Bantamweight
- Reach: 65.0 in (165 cm)
- Style: Boxing
- Years active: 2007–present

Professional boxing record
- Total: 27
- Wins: 20
- By knockout: 5
- Losses: 2
- By knockout: 0
- Draws: 5

Mixed martial arts record
- Total: 2
- Wins: 1
- By knockout: 1
- Losses: 1
- By submission: 1

Other information
- Website: http://www.officialavaknight.com/
- Boxing record from BoxRec
- Mixed martial arts record from Sherdog

Ava Michelle Knight-Salicka (born August 15, 1988) is an American professional boxer. She held the IBF female flyweight title from 2011 to 2012 and has challenged for world titles in three weight divisions; the WBC female super flyweight title in 2009; the WBO female bantamweight title in 2011; and the WBC female light flyweight title in 2013.

== Boxing career ==
A professional boxer since 2007, Knight challenged Ana María Torres for the WBC female super-flyweight World title on 29 August 2009 at Ciudad Deportiva, Mexicali, Mexico, losing out by unanimous decision.

Her next bid for a World title took place on 18 June 2011, when she faced WBO female bantamweight champion Kaliesha West at Sports Arena, Pico Rivera, California, USA. The fight ended in a split draw with one judge scoring it 96-94 for West, another 96-94 for Knight and the third ruling it a 95-95 tie.

Knight finally won a World title at the third attempt, picking up the IBF female flyweight belt by knocking out defending champion Arely Muciño in round two of their contest at Palenque de la Feria, Colima, Mexico, on 29 October 2011.

She successfully defended her title twice before claiming the WBC flyweight Diamond belt on 13 October 2012, with a unanimous decision victory over Mariana Juárez at Palacio de los Deportes, Mexico City, Mexico.

On 26 October 2013, Knight attempted to wrest the WBC female light-flyweight World crown from Ibeth Zamora Silva but lost the fight at Deportivo Agustín Ramos Millan, Toluca, Mexico, by unanimous decision.

In March 2024, it was revealed Knight had agreed to join the second season of boxing's first squad-based format, Team Combat League (TCL), competing for the Las Vegas Hustle. She made her debut on 5 April 2024, securing a unanimous decision win over Rosalinda Rodriguez in Miami, Florida, USA.

== Mixed martial arts career ==
Knight made her MMA debut against Shannon Goughary at Bellator 228 on September 28, 2019. She won the fight by TKO in the third round.

Knight faced Emilee King at Bellator 238 on January 25, 2020. She lost the bout via first round submission.

== WWE Tough Enough ==
Knight was one of 40 finalists for the 2015 season of World Wrestling Entertainment's Tough Enough, a reality television series in which aspiring pro-wrestlers compete for a spot on the organisation's roster. She was among the 10 people eliminated on the first day of the in-person tryouts held in Orlando, Florida, USA.

== Professional boxing record ==
| 27 fights | 20 wins | 2 losses |
|---|---|---|
| By knockout | 5 | 0 |
| By decision | 15 | 2 |
| Draws | 5 | |

| No. | Result | Record | Opponent | Type | Round, time | Date | Location | Notes |
|---|---|---|---|---|---|---|---|---|
| 27 | Win | 20–2–5 | Nancy Franco | UD | 6 | Dec 5, 2021 | Staples Center, Los Angeles, California, U.S. | |
| 26 | Win | 19–2–5 | Luna del Mar Torroba | UD | 8 | Nov 1, 2019 | Sam's Town Hotel & Gambling Hall, Sunrise Manor, Nevada, U.S. | |
| 25 | Win | 18–2–5 | Crystal Hoy | UD | 8 | May 17, 2019 | FedExForum, Memphis, Tennessee, U.S. | |
| 24 | Draw | 17–2–5 | Luna del Mar Torroba | TD | 3 (8), 0:30 | Feb 9, 2019 | Dignity Health Sports Park, Carson, California, U.S. | Fight stopped after Knight cut from accidental clash of heads |
| 23 | Win | 17–2–4 | Mayela Perez | UD | 6 | Dec 7, 2018 | Sam's Town Hotel & Gambling Hall, Sunrise Manor, Nevada, U.S. | |
| 22 | Win | 16–2–4 | Nancy Franco | UD | 6 | Sept 22, 2018 | Sam's Town Hotel & Gambling Hall, Sunrise Manor, Nevada, U.S. | |
| 21 | Win | 15–2–4 | Leesa Daniels | UD | 6 | Jul 21, 2018 | FedExForum, Memphis, Tennessee, U.S. | Won vacant ABF USA bantamweight title |
| 20 | Win | 14–2–4 | Judith Rodriguez | UD | 8 | Apr 23, 2016 | Centro de Usos Multiples, Los Mochis, Mexico | |
| 19 | Draw | 13–2–4 | Jasseth Noriega | SD | 6 | Feb 20, 2016 | Lobodome, Mazatlán, Mexico | |
| 18 | Win | 13-2-3 | Guadalupe Martínez Guzmán | UD | 10 | Nov 13, 2014 | Washington Hilton & Towers, Washington, D.C., U.S. | Won vacant WBC International flyweight title |
| 17 | Loss | 12-2-3 | Ibeth Zamora Silva | UD | 10 | Oct 26, 2013 | Deportivo Agustín Ramos Millan, Toluca, Mexico | For WBC light-flyweight title |
| 16 | Win | 12-1-3 | Linda Soto | UD | 10 | May 11, 2013 | Deportivo Agustín Ramos Millan, Toluca, Mexico | Retained WBC Silver flyweight title |
| 15 | Win | 11-1-3 | Susana Vazquez | UD | 10 | Jan 26, 2013 | Gimnasio Manuel Bernardo Aguirre, Chihuahua City, Mexico | Won vacant WBC Silver flyweight title |
| 14 | Win | 10-1-3 | Mariana Juárez | UD | 10 | Oct 13, 2012 | Palacio de los Deportes, Mexico City, Mexico | Won vacant WBC Diamond flyweight title |
| 13 | Win | 9-1-3 | Susana Vazquez | UD | 10 | Jun 30, 2012 | Auditorio Centenario, Torreón, Mexico | Retained IBF flyweight title |
| 12 | Win | 8-1-3 | Vacharaporn Prachumchai | TKO | 10 (10), 1:00 | Mar 31, 2012 | Gimnasio Auditorio, Los Cabos, Mexico | Retained IBF flyweight title |
| 11 | Win | 7-1-3 | Arely Muciño | KO | 2 (10), 0:45 | Oct 29, 2011 | Palenque de la Feria, Colima, Mexico | Won IBF flyweight title |
| 10 | Draw | 6-1-3 | Kaliesha West | SD | 10 | Jun 18, 2011 | Sports Arena, Pico Rivera, California, U.S. | For WBO bantamweight title |
| 9 | Win | 6-1-2 | Gloria Salas | KO | 1 (6), 1:55 | Jan 14, 2011 | Fantasy Springs Resort Casino, Indio, California, U.S. | |
| 8 | Loss | 5-1-2 | Ana María Torres | UD | 10 | Aug 29, 2009 | Ciudad Deportiva, Mexicali, Mexico | For WBC super-flyweight title |
| 7 | Win | 5-0-2 | Kaliesha West | UD | 8 | Nov 18, 2008 | Table Mountain Casino, Friant, California, U.S. | |
| 6 | Win | 4-0-2 | Noriko Kariya | KO | 5 (6), 0:20 | Jul 31, 2008 | Schuetzen Park, North Bergen, New Jersey, U.S. | |
| 5 | Draw | 3-0-2 | Elena Reid | PTS | 6 | Jun 12, 2008 | Mohegan Sun Arena, Montville, Connecticut, U.S. | |
| 4 | Win | 3-0-1 | Sharon Gaines | UD | 6 | Feb 9, 2008 | Aquarius Casino Resort, Laughlin, Nevada, U.S. | |
| 3 | Draw | 2-0-1 | Jodie Esquibel | MD | 4 | Jan 11, 2008 | Isleta Casino & Resort, Albuquerque, New Mexico, U.S. | |
| 2 | Win | 2-0 | Katarina De la Cruz | KO | 1 (4) | Sep 20, 2007 | Sagebrush Cantina, Calabasas, California, U.S. | |
| 1 | Win | 1-0 | Leonie Hall | UD | 4 | Aug 30, 2007 | Colusa Casino Resort, Colusa, California, U.S. | |

== Mixed martial arts record ==
Professional record breakdown
| 2 matches | 1 win | 1 loss |
| By knockout | 1 | 0 |
| By submission | 0 | 1 |

| Res. | Record | Opponent | Method | Event | Date | Round | Time | Location | Notes |
|---|---|---|---|---|---|---|---|---|---|
| Loss | 1–1 | Emilee King | Submission (rear-naked choke) | Bellator 238 | January 25, 2020 | 1 | 2:18 | Inglewood, California, United States | |
| Win | 1–0 | Shannon Goughary | TKO (punch to the body) | Bellator 228 | September 28, 2019 | 3 | 1:46 | Inglewood, California, United States | |

== Personal life ==
Knight has two children – a son and a daughter.

== See also ==
- List of female boxers
- List of female mixed martial artists

Sporting positions
Regional boxing titles
| New title | WBC Diamond flyweight champion October 13, 2012 – 2013; Vacated | Vacant |
| New title | WBC Silver flyweight champion January 26, 2013 – 2013; Vacated | Vacant Title next held by Raja Amasheh |
| Vacant Title last held by Yessica Chávez | WBC International flyweight champion November 13, 2014 – 2015; Vacated | Vacant Title next held by Yessica Chávez |
| New title | ABF USA bantamweight champion July 21, 2018 – 2019; Vacated | Vacant Title next held by Shelly Barnett |
World boxing titles
| Preceded by Arely Muciño | IBF flyweight champion October 29, 2011 – 2014; Vacated | Vacant Title next held by Gabriela Bouvier |
