= Guadalupe Bautista =

Mexican boxer (born 1988)

Personal information
- Born: 19 April 1988 (age 38) Mexico City, Mexico
- Weight: Light flyweight; Flyweight

Boxing career

Boxing record
- Total fights: 37
- Wins: 23
- Win by KO: 6
- Losses: 12
- Draws: 2

María Guadalupe Bautista Hernández (born 19 April 1988) is a Mexican professional boxer. She is a two-time world female light-flyweight champion, having held the WBA (Regular) and the IBF titles.

== Professional career ==
Bautista suffered her first defeat in her professional debut on 17 September 2009, losing via four-round unanimous decision (UD) against future world champion Maribel Ramírez at the Woda Night Club in Mexico City.

After compiling a record of 3–4–1—including two more defeats to Maribel Ramírez—Bautista suffered three consecutive defeats via UD against future world champions in 2012; Ibeth Zamora Silva for the WBC Youth female light flyweight title on 3 March; Esmeralda Moreno for the WBC Silver female light flyweight title on 17 May; and Jessica Nery Plata for the WBC Youth female light flyweight title on 7 July.

After two years out of the ring, she bounced back from the defeats with a four-round split decision (SD) victory against Itzel Barrera in September 2014, followed by a six-round points decision (PTS) loss against another future world champion, Monserrat Alarcón, in December. Bautista captured the vacant Mexican female light flyweight title in her next fight, defeating Mitzi Rodríguez via ten-round SD on 30 May 2015, at the Gimnasio Sportyka in Mexico City.

After nine more fights—seven wins, one loss and one draw—she faced Andrea Sanchez for the vacant IBF female light flyweight title. The bout took place on 12 May 2018, at the Club Unión Progresista in Villa Ángela, Argentina, with Bautista emerging victorious with an eighth-round technical knockout (TKO) to capture the vacant IBF title. She lost the title via SD in her first defence, suffering the eleventh defeat of her career, against Evelyn Nazarena Bermúdez on 29 December at Club Atlético Talleres in Villa Gobernador Gálvez, Argentina. One judge scored the bout 96–94 in favour of Bautista while the other two scored it 96–94 to Bermúdez.

In her next fight she moved up to the flyweight division, defeating Nayeli Verde via UD (100–90, 100–90, 100–91) to capture the WBC Silver female title on 24 August 2019, at the Auditorio Sub-Delegacion Valle Verde in Ixtapaluca, Mexico. She ended 2019 with a UD victory against Karen Rubio in December to retain her title.

Following two decision wins in non-title fights, she moved back down to light flyweight to face Nora Cardoza for the vacant WBA (Regular) female light flyweight title. The bout took place on 12 December 2020 at the Salon de Fiestas Figlos Stase in Culiacán, Mexico. Bautista defeated Cardoza via shutout UD, with all three judges scoring the bout 100–90.

Bautista lost her title to Sara Haghighat-Joo by unanimous decision at Toronto Casino Resort in Toronto, Canada, on 27 April 2024.

== Professional boxing record ==
37 fights	23 wins	12 losses
By knockout	6	0
By decision	16	12
By disqualification	1	0
Draws	2	

No.	Result	Record	Opponent	Type	Round, time	Date	Location	Notes
37	Loss	23–12–2	(Canada) Sara Haghighat-Joo	UD	10	27 April 2024	Toronto Casino Resort, Toronto, Canada	Lost the WBA (Regular) female light-flyweight World title
36	Win	23–11–2	(Mexico) Maria Goreti	TKO	5 (10)	23 December 2023	Toluca, Mexico	
35	Win	22–11–2	(Mexico) Gabriela Sanchez Saavedra	UD	10	3 December 2022	Tlalnepantla, Mexico	Retained the WBA (Regular) female light-flyweight World title
34	Win	21–11–2	(Mexico) Jaqueline Lopez Trejo	TKO	3 (10)	2 September 2022	Culiacan, Sinalo, Mexico	
33	Win	20–11–2	(Mexico) Rosalinda Gomez Vazquez	TKO	6 (10)	10 Dec 2021	Auditorio Benito Juarez, Los Mochis, Mexico	
32	Win	19–11–2	(Mexico) Nora Cardoza	UD	10	13 November 2021	Polyforum De La Feria, Torreon, Mexico	
31	Win	18–11–2	(Mexico) Alma Meraz Rodriguez	MD	10	4 September 2021	Auditorio del Estado, Mexicali, Mexico	Retained the WBA (Regular) female light-flyweight World title
30	Win	17–11–2	(Mexico) Nora Cardoza	UD	10	12 Dec 2020	Salon de Fiestas Figlos Stasi, Culiacán, Mexico	Won vacant WBA (Regular) female light flyweight title
29	Win	16–11–2	(Mexico) Araceli Palacios	SD	8	17 Oct 2020	Gimnasio Green Day, Culiacán, Mexico	
28	Win	15–11–2	(Mexico) Edith Flores	UD	8	6 Mar 2020	Polideportivo Juan S. Millan, Culiacán, Mexico	
27	Win	14–11–2	(Mexico) Karen Rubio	UD	10	13 Dec 2019	Polideportivo Juan S. Millan, Culiacán, Mexico	Retained WBC Silver female flyweight title
26	Win	13–11–2	(Mexico) Nayeli Verde	UD	10	24 Aug 2019	Auditorio Sub-Delegacion Valle Verde, Ixtapaluca, Mexico	Won vacant WBC Silver female flyweight title
25	Loss	12–11–2	(Argentina) Evelyn Nazarena Bermúdez	SD	10	29 Dec 2018	Club Atlético Talleres, Villa Gobernador Gálvez, Argentina	Lost IBF female light flyweight title
24	Win	12–10–2	(Argentina) Andrea Soledad Sanchez	TKO	8 (10)	12 May 2018	Club Unión Progresista, Villa Ángela, Argentina	Won vacant IBF female light flyweight title
23	Win	11–10–2	(Mexico) Yanely Ceja Hernández	TKO	3 (6), 1:15	25 Feb 2018	Villa, Ciudad Nicolás Romero, Mexico	
22	Win	10–10–2	(Mexico) Yesenia Gómez	MD	8	30 Sep 2017	Grand Oasis Arena, Cancún, Mexico	
21	Win	9–10–2	(Mexico) Delia Lopez	UD	8	4 Aug 2017	Arena José Sulaimán, Monterrey, Mexico	
20	Win	8–10–2	(Mexico) Carolina Garcia	UD	8	23 Feb 2017	Foro TV Azteca, Monterrey, Mexico	
19	Win	7–10–2	(Mexico) Cristina Hernández	UD	8	9 Dec 2016	Gym Uribe Team, Tlalnepantla, Mexico	
18	Loss	6–10–2	(Mexico) Lourdes Juárez	UD	8	13 Aug 2016	Auditorio Benito Juárez, Veracruz, Mexico	
17	Draw	6–9–2	(Mexico) Silvia Torres	SD	4	2 Jul 2016	Gimnasio Municipal "Jose Neri Santos", Ciudad Juárez, Mexico	
16	Win	6–9–1	(Mexico) Guadalupe Ramírez	UD	8	30 Apr 2016	Deportivo Tolti, Tultitlán, Mexico	
15	Loss	5–9–1	(Mexico) Jasseth Noriega	SD	6	18 Dec 2015	Deportivo Tlalli, Tlalnepantla, Mexico	
14	Win	5–8–1	(Mexico) Mitzi Rodríguez	SD	10	30 May 2015	Gimnasio Sportyka, Mexico City, Mexico	Won vacant Mexican light flyweight title
13	Loss	4–8–1	(Mexico) Monserrat Alarcón	PTS	6	20 Dec 2014	Jose Cuervo Salon, Mexico City, Mexico	
12	Win	4–7–1	(Mexico) Itzel Barrera	SD	4	16 Sep 2014	Ocoyoacac, Mexico	
11	Loss	3–7–1	(Mexico) Jessica Nery Plata	UD	10	7 Jul 2012	Palanque de la Feria, Chilpancingo, Mexico	For WBC Youth female light flyweight title
10	Loss	3–6–1	(Mexico) Esmeralda Moreno	UD	10	17 May 2012	Expo Feria, Morelia, Mexico	For WBC Silver female light flyweight title
9	Loss	3–5–1	(Mexico) Ibeth Zamora Silva	UD	10	3 Mar 2012	Deportiva Trabajadores del Metro, Mexico City, Mexico	For WBC Youth female light flyweight title
8	Win	3–4–1	(Mexico) Lucia Alfaro	KO	5 (6)	14 Oct 2011	Salon Marbet Plus, Nezalhuatcóyotl, Mexico	
7	Win	2–4–1	(Mexico) Vanesa Santiago	DQ	2 (4)	11 Jun 2011	Auditorio Miguel Barragán, San Luis Potosí, Mexico	
6	Loss	1–4–1	(Mexico) María Salinas	UD	6	11 Mar 2011	Gimnasio Municipal, Saltillo, Mexico	
5	Loss	1–3–1	(Mexico) Maribel Ramírez	PTS	6	19 Feb 2011	Cuautla, Mexico	
4	Draw	1–2–1	(Mexico) Perla Hernández	MD	4	10 Jun 2010	Jose Curva Salon, Mexico City Mexico	
3	Win	2–1	(Mexico) Lilia Ramirez	PTS	4	13 Feb 2010	Domo Deportivo Metropolitano, Nezalhuatcóyotl, Mexico	
2	Loss	0–2	(Mexico) Maribel Ramírez	SD	4	30 Oct 2009	Salon Marbet Plus, Nezalhaulcótyl, Mexico	
1	Loss	0–1	(Mexico) Maribel Ramírez	UD	4	17 Sep 2009	Woda Night Club, Mexico City, Mexico	

Sporting positions
Regional boxing titles
Vacant Title last held by Esmeralda Moreno	Mexican female light flyweight champion 30 May 2015 – December 2015	Vacant Title next held by Lucia Hernández Núnez
World boxing titles
Vacant Title last held by Alondra Garcia	IBF female light flyweight champion 12 May 2018 – 29 December 2018	Succeeded by Evelyn Nazarena Bermúdez
Vacant Title last held by Raja Amasheh	WBC female light flyweight champion Silver title 24 August 2019 – November 2020	Vacant Title next held by Isabel Milan
Vacant Title last held by Yésica Bopp; Promoted to Super champion	WBA female light flyweight champion Regular title 12 December 2020 – 27 April 2024	Succeeded by Sara Haghighat-Joo
