= Kim Clavel =

Canadian boxer born 1990

Personal information
- Born: 9 September 1990 (age 35) Montreal, Quebec, Canada
- Height: 5 ft 1 in (155 cm)
- Weight: Light flyweight, Minimumweight

Boxing career
- Reach: 60 1/2 in (154 cm)
- Stance: Orthodox

Boxing record
- Total fights: 24
- Wins: 21
- Win by KO: 3
- Losses: 2

Kim Clavel is a Canadian professional boxer. She is a two-weight world champion, having held the IBF female minimumweight title since September 2025, and was previously the WBC female light-flyweight title holder.

== Professional career ==
Clavel made her professional debut on December 16, 2017, scoring a four-round unanimous decision against Yoseline Martinez Jose at Place Bell in Laval, Quebec.

After compiling a record of 11–0 (2 KO), Clavel faced Esmeralda Gaona Sagahon for the vacant WBC-NABF female light flyweight title on December 7, 2019, at the Bell Centre in Montreal. Clavel won her first professional title via unanimous decision, with all three judges scoring the bout 100–90.

Clavel beat Mexico's defending champion Yesenia Gómez by unanimous decision to claim the WBC female light-flyweight World title on 27 July 2022 at Montreal Casino, Montreal, Canada.

In her next fight she contested a light-flyweight unification title bout against WBA champion Jessica Nery Plata on 13 January 2023 at the Place Bell in Laval, Canada, losing by unanimous decision.

Clavel lost via split decision to IBF and WBO female light-flyweight World champion Evelyn Bermudez from Argentina in a bout at the Place Bell in Laval, Canada, on 7 October 2023. Judges Benoit Roussel and Frank Lombardi scored the fight 96-94 in favor of Bermudez while Bill Lerch handed a 98-92 card to Clavel.

In August 2025, Clavel signed a promotional contract with Jake Paul led Most Valuable Promotions.

Clavel challenged IBF minimumweight champion Sol Cudos at Théâtre Saint-Denis in Montreal, Canada, on 27 September 2025. She won the fight by unanimous decision to take the title and become a two-weight world champion.

== Professional boxing record ==
24 fights	22 wins	2 losses
By knockout	3	0
By decision	19	2

No.	Result	Record	Opponent	Type	Round, time	Date	Location	Notes
24	Win	22–2	Sol Cudos	UD	10	27 September 2025	Théâtre Saint-Denis, Montreal, Canada	Won IBF female minimumweight title
23	Win	21–2	Anabel Ortiz	UD	10	Feb 27, 2025	Montreal Casino, Montreal, Canada	Won the vacant IBF Intercontinental and WBC International female minimumweight titles
22	Win	20–2	Mayela Perez	UD	10	Nov 14, 2024	Montreal Casino, Montreal, Canada	
21	Win	19–2	Katherine Renee Lindenmuth	UD	10	May 16, 2024	Montreal Casino, Montreal, Canada	
20	Win	18–2	Fara El Bousairi	MD	10	April 4, 2024	Montreal Casino, Montreal, Canada	
19	Loss	17–2	Evelyn Bermudez	SD	10	October 7, 2023	Place Bell, Laval, Quebec, Canada	For IBF and WBO light-flyweight titles
18	Win	17–1	Naomi Arellano Reyes	UD	10	May 12, 2023	Place Bell, Laval, Quebec, Canada	Won vacant WBC International light-flyweight title
17	Loss	16–1	Jessica Nery Plata	UD	10	Jan 13, 2023	Place Bell, Laval, Quebec, Canada	Lost WBC light-flyweight title; For WBA light-flyweight Super title
16	Win	16–0	Yesenia Gómez	UD	10	Jul 29, 2022	Montreal Casino, Montreal, Quebec, Canada	Won WBC light-flyweight title
15	Win	15–0	Mariela Ribera Valverde	RTD	4 (10), 2:00	Mar 11, 2022	Montreal Casino, Montreal, Quebec, Canada	Retained WBC Silver light-flyweight title
14	Win	14–0	Maria Soledad Vargas	UD	10	Aug 28, 2021	IGA Stadium, Montreal, Canada	Won vacant WBC Silver light-flyweight title
13	Win	13–0	Barbara Alejandra Martinez Munoz	UD	6	Nov 28, 2020	Deportivo Cri Cri, Cuernavaca, Mexico	
12	Win	12–0	Natalie Gonzalez	UD	8	Jul 21, 2020	MGM Grand, Paradise, Nevada, U.S.	
11	Win	11–0	Esmeralda Gaona Sagahon	UD	10	Dec 7, 2019	Bell Centre, Montreal, Canada	Won vacant NABF light-flyweight title
10	Win	10–0	Xenia Jorneac	UD	8	Sep 26, 2019	Montreal Casino, Montreal, Canada	
9	Win	9–0	Nora Cardoza	UD	8	Jun 15, 2019	Centre Gervais Auto, Shawinigan, Canada	
8	Win	8–0	Tamara Elisabet DeMarco	UD	8	May 17, 2019	Montreal Casino, Montreal, Canada	
7	Win	7–0	Soledad Macedo	UD	8	Mar 16, 2019	Montreal Casino, Montreal, Canada	
6	Win	6–0	Luz Elena Martinez	TKO	4 (6), 2:56	Jan 26, 2019	Montreal Casino, Montreal, Canada	
5	Win	5–0	Ana Victoria Polo	UD	6	Nov 24, 2018	Le Centre Financiere Sun Life, Rimouski, Canada	
4	Win	4–0	Cinthia Martinez	UD	4	Oct 13, 2018	Montreal Casino, Montreal, Canada	
3	Win	3–0	Ana Karen Compean	KO	1 (4), 0:55	Apr 7, 2018	Videotron Centre, Quebec City, Canada	
2	Win	2–0	Jessica Guerrero	UD	4	Feb 10, 2018	Centre Gervais Auto, Shawinigan, Canada	
1	Win	1–0	Yoseline Martinez Jose	UD	4	Dec 16, 2017	Place Bell, Laval, Canada	

== Outside the ring ==
In 2020 she was awarded the Pat Tillman Award for Service at the 2020 ESPY Awards for her service as a nurse during the COVID-19 pandemic.

In 2021 she was a competitor in the Quebec edition of Big Brother Célébrités.

== See also ==
- List of female boxers

Sporting positions
Regional boxing titles
Vacant Title last held by Kenia Enríquez	NABF light-flyweight champion 7 December 2019 – 29 July 2022; Won world title	Vacant
Vacant Title last held by Seniesa Estrada	WBC Silver light-flyweight champion 28 August 2021 – 29 July 2022; Won world title	Vacant Title next held by Leonela Paola Yúdica
Vacant Title last held by Tania Enriquez	WBC International light-flyweight champion 12 May 2023 – present	Incumbent
World boxing titles
Preceded by Yesenia Gómez	WBC light-flyweight champion 29 July 2022 – 13 January 2023	Succeeded by Jessica Nery Plata
