= Yesica Nery Plata =

Mexican boxer (born 1994)

Jessica Nery Plata
Personal information
- Nickname: La Poderosa ("The Powerful")
- Born: Yesica Nery Plata Noriega; 17 May 1994 (age 32) Mexico
- Height: 5 ft 3 in (160 cm)
- Weight: Light flyweight; Flyweight

Boxing career
- Stance: Orthodox

Boxing record
- Total fights: 34
- Wins: 31
- Win by KO: 3
- Losses: 3

Yesica Nery Plata Noriega (born 17 May 1994) is a Mexican professional boxer who has held the WBA and WBC female light-flyweight titles.

== Professional career ==
Plata made her professional debut on 9 July 2011, scoring a four-round majority decision (MD) victory against Estrella Valverde at the Jose Cuervo Salon in Mexico City, Mexico.

After three more wins, one by stoppage, she defeated Ibeth Zamora Silva via unanimous decision (UD) over ten rounds, capturing the WBC Youth female light flyweight title on 21 April 2012 at the Estadio José Lerma Pérez in Ocoyoacac, Mexico. She won her next ten fights, defending her WBC Youth title seven times, before suffering the first defeat of her career via UD on 1 August 2015 against former world champion Esmeralda Moreno, in a non-title fight, at the Auditorio del Bicentenario in Morelia, Mexico. The three judges scored the bout 98–92, 97–93 and 96–94 in favour of Moreno.

Following defeat she secured five wins, one by stoppage, before facing Maria Magdalena Rivera on 14 October 2017 at the Poliforum in Ocotlán, Mexico, with the vacant WBF female flyweight title on the line. Plata captured the lightly regarded world title via UD, with two judges scoring the bout 97–93 and the third scoring it 96–94.

Her next fight came the following month on 18 November against Kenia Enríquez at the Centro de Usos Multiples in Ciudad Obregón, Mexico, with Enriquez' WBC interim female light flyweight title up for grabs. Plata was knocked to the canvas in the final seconds of the tenth and final round en route to the second defeat of her career, losing via UD with scores of 97–92, 97–93 and 96–93.

She challenged for a second interim world title in her next fight, this time against undefeated champion Silvia Torres on 14 April 2018 at the Domo Sindicato de Trabajadores IMSS in Mexico City. In a fight which she dedicated to her mother who had died in the preceding months, Plata captured the WBA interim female light flyweight title by via split decision (SD), with two judges scoring the bout 98–93 and 96–94 in favour of Plata, while the third scored it 97–94 in favour of Torres.

On 11 March 2022, Plata upgraded to full WBA female light-flyweight World champion when she defeated Yésica Bopp by split decision at The Majestic Casino, in Panama City, Panama. Two ringside judges scored 97-93 and 96–94 in Plata's favour with the third having it 97-93 for Bopp.

She added the WBC female light-flyweight titles to her collection on 13 January 2023 when she secured a unanimous decision win over Kim Clavel at the Place Bell in Laval, Canada.

Plata successfully defended both belts against Sarah Bormann in Karlsruhe, Germany, on 16 December 2023, winning by split decision. One judge scored the fight 95-94 for Bormann with the other two going for Plata by 96-93 and 97-92 respectively.

She signed with Jake Paul's Most Valuable Promotions in July 2025.

Nery Plata was scheduled to challenge Lourdes Juárez for her WBC light flyweight title on October 18, 2025, in South Padre Island, TX. Nery Plata lost the fight by majority decision.

== Professional boxing record ==
34 fights	31 wins	3 losses
By knockout	3	0
By decision	28	3

No.	Result	Record	Opponent	Type	Round, time	Date	Location	Notes
34	Win	31–3	Brook Sibrian	UD	8	30 May 2026	County Coliseum, El Paso, Texas, U.S	
33	Loss	30–3	Lourdes Juárez	MD	10	18 Oct 2025	Convention Center, South Padre Island, U.S	For WBC light-flyweight title
32	Win	30–2	Sarah Bormann	SD	10	16 Dec 2023	Weihnachtscirkus, Karlsruhe, Germany	Retained WBA and WBC light-flyweight titles
31	Win	29–2	Kim Clavel	UD	10	13 Jan 2023	Place Bell, Laval, Quebec, Canada	Retained WBA light-flyweight title; Won WBC light-flyweight title
30	Win	28–2	Yésica Bopp	SD	10	11 Mar 2022	Majestic Casino, Panama City, Panama	Won WBA light-flyweight (Super) title
29	Win	27–2	Sandra Robles	UD	8	12 Sep 2020	Gimnasio TV Azteca, Mexico City, Mexico	
28	Win	26–2	Edith Flores	UD	8	20 Jun 2020	Gimnasio TV Azteca, Mexico City, Mexico	
27	Win	25–2	Barbara Munoz	UD	8	10 Aug 2019	Estadio Antonio R. Marquez, San Juan de los Lagos, Mexico	
26	Win	24–2	Alondra Garcia	UD	10	9 Mar 2019	Centro de Convenciones, Tamazula de Gordiano, Mexico	Retained WBA interim light-flyweight title
25	Win	23–2	Nancy Franco	UD	8	4 Aug 2018	Domo Sindicato de Trabajadores IMSS, Mexico City, Mexico	
24	Win	22–2	Silvia Torres	SD	10	14 Apr 2018	Domo Sindicato de Trabajadores IMSS, Mexico City, Mexico	Won WBA interim light-flyweight title
23	Loss	21–2	Kenia Enríquez	UD	10	18 Nov 2017	Centro de Usos Multiples, Ciudad Obregón, Mexico	For WBC interim light-flyweight title
22	Win	21–1	Maria Magdalena Rivera	UD	10	14 Oct 2017	Poliforum, Ocotlán, Mexico	Won vacant WBF flyweight title
21	Win	20–1	Delia Lopez	UD	6	27 May 2017	Auditorio De La Expo, Ciudad Obregón, Mexico	
20	Win	19–1	Jazmin Ortega	UD	8	8 Oct 2016	EcoCentro Expositor Querétaro, El Marqués, Mexico	
19	Win	18–1	Jasseth Noriega	UD	8	2 Jul 2016	Arena Coliseo, Mexico City, Mexico	
18	Win	17–1	Yanely Ceja Hernandez	RTD	6 (8), 2:00	9 Apr 2016	Auditorio Benito Juárez, Veracruz, Mexico	
17	Win	16–1	Anahi Torres	UD	6	13 Feb 2016	EcoCentro Expositor Querétaro, El Marqués, Mexico	
16	Loss	15–1	Esmeralda Moreno	UD	10	1 Aug 2015	Auditorio del Bicentenario, Morelia, Mexico	
15	Win	15–0	Guadalupe Ramirez	UD	8	22 Nov 2014	Plaza de los Martíres, Toluca, Mexico	
14	Win	14–0	Ana Cristina Vargas	UD	10	28 Jun 2014	Sindicato de Trabajadores, Mexico City, Mexico	Retained WBC Youth light-flyweight title
13	Win	13–0	Maria Salinas	UD	10	22 Feb 2014	Sindicato de Trabajadores, Mexico City, Mexico	Retained WBC Youth light-flyweight title
12	Win	12–0	Alejandra Lopez	UD	10	30 Nov 2013	Centro de Convenciones IMSS, Mexico City, Mexico	Retained WBC Youth light-flyweight title
11	Win	11–0	Jasseth Noriega	UD	10	10 Aug 2013	Auditorio Plaza Condesa, Mexico City, Mexico	Retained WBC Youth light-flyweight title
10	Win	10–0	Yesenia Martinez Castrejon	UD	10	6 Jul 2013	Deportivo del Sindicato del Metro, Mexico City, Mexico	Retained WBC Youth light-flyweight title
9	Win	9–0	Ivoon Rosas	UD	10	23 Feb 2013	Deportivo del Sindicato del Metro, Mexico City, Mexico	Retained WBC Youth light-flyweight title
8	Win	8–0	Guadalupe Ramirez	TKO	3 (6), 1:16	24 Nov 2012	Foro Polanco, Mexico City, Mexico	
7	Win	7–0	Kareli Lopez	SD	8	1 Sep 2012	Gimnasio Municipal Luis Estrada Medina, Guasave, Mexico	
6	Win	6–0	Guadalupe Bautista	UD	10	7 Jul 2012	Palenque de la Feria, Chilpancingo, Mexico	Retained WBC Youth light-flyweight title
5	Win	5–0	Ibeth Zamora Silva	SD	10	21 Apr 2012	Estadio José Lerma Pérez, Ocoyoacac, Mexico	Won WBC Youth light-flyweight title
4	Win	4–0	Viridiana Ramos	SD	4	18 Feb 2012	Auditorio Municipal, Zumpango, Mexico	
3	Win	3–0	Kandy Sandoval	UD	6	19 Nov 2011	Sindicato de Trabajadores, Mexico City, Mexico	
2	Win	2–0	Yazmin Marin	TKO	3 (4), 1:26	21 Oct 2011	Arena Adolfo López Mateos, Tlalnepantla de Baz, Mexico	
1	Win	1–0	Estrella Valverde	MD	4	9 Jul 2011	Jose Cuervo Salon, Mexico City, Mexico	

== See also ==
- List of female boxers
- List of Mexican boxing world champions

Sporting positions
Regional boxing titles
Vacant Title last held by Ibeth Zamora Silva	WBC Youth light-flyweight champion 21 April 2012 – 2014; Vacated	Vacant Title next held by Yesenia Gómez
Minor world boxing titles
Vacant Title last held by Isabel Millan	WBF flyweight champion 14 October 2017 – 14 April 2018; Won interim title	Succeeded by Laetitia Arzalier
Major world boxing titles
Preceded by Silvia Torres	WBA light-flyweight champion Interim title 14 April 2018 – 11 March 2022; Won Super title	Vacant
Preceded by Yésica Bopp	WBA light-flyweight champion Super title 11 March 2022 – present	Incumbent
Preceded by Kim Clavel	WBC light-flyweight champion 13 January 2023 – present	Incumbent
