= Sara Bailey (boxer) =

Canadian-Iranian-Sierra Leonan boxer born 1994

Personal information
- Born: Sara Haghighat-Joo; June 17, 1994 (age 32) North Vancouver, British Columbia, Canada
- Height: 5 ft 4 in (163 cm)
- Weight: Light-flyweight, Flyweight, Bantamweight

Boxing career
- Stance: Orthodox

Boxing record
- Total fights: 8
- Wins: 7
- Losses: 1
Medal record
Women's amateur boxing
Representing Sierra Leone
African Elite Boxing Championships
Gold medal – first place	2022 Maputo	Bantamweight

Sara Bailey (née Haghighat-Joo) (Persian: ساعی بیلی; born 17 June 1994) is Sierra Leonean-Canadian professional boxer of Iranian descent. She is a former WBA female light-flyweight champion. As an amateur, Bailey was the first Sierra Leonean competitor to win a gold medal at the African Elite Boxing Championships.

== Amateur career ==
Bailey is a five-time Canadian amateur champion and has also won two Irish amateur titles. Having previously represented Canada on the international stage, she began boxing for Sierra Leone – qualifying through her grandparents – in 2020.

She was selected to take part in the light-flyweight division at the 2022 Commonwealth Games in Birmingham, England, but was disqualified before her quarter-final bout with Uganda's Teddy Nakimuli after failing to make the required 50 kg weight limit by a mere 0.1 kg, something she blamed on a discrepancy between the test scales and the official scales.

In September 2022, Bailey became the first Sierra Leonean to win a gold medal at the African Elite Boxing Championships when she defeated Algeria's Fatma Zohra Abdelkader in the bantamweight final in Maputo, Mozambique.

== Professional career ==
After signing a promotional deal with Ontario-based United Promotions, she made her professional debut on 12 November 2022, securing a unanimous decision victory over Nayeli Verde at the CAA Centre in Brampton, Canada, in a fight streamed live on DAZN.

In just her fourth pro-fight, Bailey claimed the WBA female light-flyweight title (Regular version), beating defending champion Guadalupe Bautista by unanimous decision at Great Canadian Casino Resort in Toronto, Canada, on 27 April 2024. Her victory made her the fastest professional world champion in Canadian boxing history.

Having been elevated to full WBA champion status, Bailey successfully defended her title for the first time against Anabel Ortiz at Great Canadian Casino Resort in Toronto on 12 December 2024, winning by unanimous decision.

Bailey made the second defense of her title against Cristina Navarro on 7 March 2025 at Great Canadian Casino Resort in Toronto. She won via unanimous decision.

Bailey faced IBF and WBO female light-flyweight champion Evelin Bermúdez in a title unification at Hard Rock Casino in Ottawa on 20 September 2025. Having been knocked to the canvas twice, she lost by stoppage in the first round.

== Personal life ==
Bailey’s parents emigrated to Canada from Iran. She is fluent in Persian and studied Human Kinetics at the University of British Columbia before transferring to the University of Guelph when she switched boxing training bases. Bailey is married to her coach/manager Stevie Bailey.

== Professional boxing record ==
8 fights	7 wins	1 loss
By knockout	0	1
By decision	7	0

No.	Result	Record	Opponent	Type	Round, time	Date	Location	Notes
8	Win	7–1	Mariela Ribera Valverde	UD	10	11 Apr 2026	Hard Rock Casino, Ottawa, Ontario, Canada	
7	Loss	6–1	Evelyn Nazarena Bermúdez	TKO	1 (10), 1:47	20 Sep 2025	Hard Rock Casino, Ottawa, Ontario, Canada	Lost WBA female light-flyweight title; For IBF and WBO female light-flyweight titles
6	Win	6–0	Cristina Navarro	UD	10	7 Mar 2025	Great Canadian Casino Resort, Toronto, Ontario, Canada	Retained WBA female light-flyweight title
5	Win	5–0	Anabel Ortiz	UD	10	12 Dec 2024	Great Canadian Casino Resort, Toronto, Ontario, Canada	Retained WBA female light-flyweight title
4	Win	4–0	Guadalupe Bautista	UD	10	27 Apr 2024	Great Canadian Casino Resort, Toronto, Ontario, Canada	Won WBA female light-flyweight (Regular) title
3	Win	3–0	Esmeralda Gaona Sagahon	UD	8	21 Oct 2023	Pickering Casino Resort, Pickering, Ontario, Canada	
2	Win	2–0	Mayela Perez	UD	10	25 Feb 2023	CAA Centre, Brampton, Ontario, Canada	
1	Win	1–0	Nayeli Verde	UD	8	12 Nov 2022	CAA Centre, Brampton Ontario, Canada	

== See also ==
- List of female boxers

Sporting positions
World boxing titles
Preceded by Guadalupe Bautista	WBA light-flyweight champion April 27, 2024 – September 20, 2025; Regular title until November 2024	Succeeded by Evelyn Nazarena Bermúdez
