= Louisa Hawton =

Australian boxer (born 1985)

Personal information
- Nicknames: Bang Bang Lulu; The Smiling Assassin
- Nationality: Australian
- Born: Louisa Hawton; 9 March 1985 (age 41) Fremantle, Australia
- Height: 5 ft 0 in (152 cm)
- Weight: Atomweight; Mini-flyweight; Light-flyweight; Flyweight

Boxing career
- Reach: 62 in (157 cm)
- Stance: Orthodox

Boxing record
- Total fights: 14
- Wins: 12
- Win by KO: 6
- Losses: 2

Louisa Hawton (born 9 March 1985) is an Australian professional boxer. She has held the WBC interim female atomweight title since 2019 and previously the WBO female junior-flyweight title in 2016. As of May 2020, she is ranked as the world's eighth best active female atomweight by BoxRec.

== Professional boxing record ==
14 fights	12 wins	2 losses
By knockout	6	0
By decision	6	2

No.	Result	Record	Opponent	Type	Round, time	Date	Location	Notes
14	Win	12–2	Viviana Ruiz Corredor	UD	10	7 Sep 2024	HBF Stadium, Perth, Australia	Won WBA Oceania female flyweight title
13	Win	11–2	Arisara Wisetwongsa	TKO	1 (6), 1:44	25 Apr 2024	Spaceplus Bangkok RCA, Bangkok, Thailand	
12	Win	10–2	Lorraine Villalobos	UD	10	7 Dec 2019	Barclays Center, New York City, New York, U.S.	Won WBC interim female atomweight title
11	Win	9–2	Lorraine Villalobos	RTD	5 (10), 2:00	8 Dec 2018	StubHub Center, Carson, California, U.S.	
10	Loss	8–2	Brenda Flores	SD	10	8 Sep 2018	The Forum, Inglewood, California, U.S.	For WBC interim female atomweight title
9	Win	8–1	Elvia Trevino	RTD	4 (6), 2:00	6 Jun 2018	The Avalon, Los Angeles, California, U.S.	
8	Loss	7–1	Anahi Torres	UD	8	24 Feb 2018	The Forum, Inglewood, California, U.S.	For vacant WBC International female light-flyweight title
7	Win	7–0	Kei Takenaka	UD	10	20 Aug 2016	Komagatani Gym, Sanda, Japan	Won vacant WBO female light-flyweight title
6	Win	6–0	Chamaporn Chairin	TKO	3 (8), 0:41	28 Aug 2015	WA Italian Club, Perth, Australia	
5	Win	5–0	Jujeath Nagaowa	UD	6	8 May 2015	WA Italian Club, Perth, Australia	
4	Win	4–0	Angor Onesongchaigym	RTD	4 (10), 2:00	13 Feb 2015	WA Italian Club, Perth, Australia	
3	Win	3–0	Payayong Sueksasongkro	UD	4	29 Aug 2014	WA Italian Club, Perth, Australia	
2	Win	2–0	Wiilaiwan Namuanghchan	KO	1 (4), 1:49	20 Jun 2014	Metro City, Perth, Australia	
1	Win	1–0	Nongaen Phosuwan	UD	4	1 Mar 2014	Mike Barnett Sports Complex, Rockingham, Australia	

== Television appearances ==
In 2023, Hawton was a contestant on the Australian reality television show The Summit.

== Personal life ==
Hawton has two children and is now based in the United States, she has the net worth of about 350'000$.
