= Sol Cudos =

Argentine boxer (born 1997)

Personal information
- Born: 3 July 1997 (age 29) Moreno, Buenos Aires, Argentina
- Weight: Minimumweight

Boxing career
- Stance: Orthodox

Boxing record
- Wins: 10
- Win by KO: 3
- Losses: 1
- Draws: 2

Sol Cudos (born 3 July 1997) is an Argentine professional boxer. She held the IBF female minimumweight title from April 2025 to September 2025.

Already the WBA South American female minimumweight champion, Cudos recovered from being knocked down in the seventh round to win the vacant IBF female minimumweight title by defeating Maria Sol Baumstarh via split decision at Estadio F.A.B in Buenos Aires, Argentina, on 5 April 2025, with the judges' scorecards reading 96–93, 95–94 and 93–96.

She made the first defense of her title against Kim Clavel at Théâtre Saint-Denis in Montreal, Canada, on 27 September 2025. Cudos lost by unanimous decision.
