= Katia Gutiérrez =

Mexican boxer (born 1989)

Personal information
- Nickname: Katty
- Born: 29 April 1989 (age 37) Los Mochis, Sinaloa, Mexico
- Weight: Mini flyweight; Light flyweight

Boxing career
- Stance: Orthodox

Boxing record
- Total fights: 31
- Wins: 23
- Win by KO: 6
- Losses: 8

Katia Gutiérrez (born 29 April 1989) is a Mexican professional boxer who held the IBF female mini flyweight title from 2011 to 2013. She also challenged for the IBF female junior flyweight title in 2011; the WBC female mini flyweight title in 2014; and the WBA female mini flyweight title in 2016.

== Professional career ==
Gutiérrez made her professional debut on 10 August 2007, scoring a four-round majority decision (MD) victory against Guadalupe Cortes at the Polideportivo Centenario in Los Mochis, Mexico.

After compiling a record of 11–2 (3 KOs) she faced Irma Sánchez for the inaugural IBF female junior flyweight title on 22 January 2011 at the Arena Neza in Ciudad Nezahualcóyotl, Mexico. Gutiérrez suffered through third defeat of her career, losing via unanimous decision (UD) over ten rounds.

Three months later she challenged for her second world title—the inaugural IBF female mini flyweight title—against former world champion Hollie Dunaway on 16 April at the World Trade Center in Boca del Río, Mexico. Gutiérrez defeated Dunaway via UD with the judges' scorecards reading 99–91, 98–92, and 97–93. After four successful defences, Gutiérrez was stripped of the title in 2012.

After three more fights—a UD victory against Kareli Lopez in April 2013; a split decision (SD) defeat to Irma Sánchez in a September 2013 rematch; and a UD victory against Brenda Flores in April 2014—Gutiérrez faced WBC female mini flyweight champion Yuko Kuroki on 1 November 2014 at Acros in Fukuoka, Japan. Gutiérrez suffered the fifth defeat of her career, losing via SD. One judge scored the bout 97–93 in favour of Gutiérrez while the other two scored it 96–94 to Kuroki.

In her next fight she suffered a technical decision (TD) against former world champion Kenia Enríquez in November 2015. The bout was stopped in the fifth round after Gutiérrez received a cut above her left eye from an accidental clash of heads.

Following the defeat to Enríquez, Gutiérrez fought for her fourth world title, facing WBA female mini flyweight champion Anabel Ortiz on 30 April 2016 at Malecon Turistico in Guaymas, Mexico. Gutiérrez suffered her third consecutive defeat and the seventh of her career, losing via shutout UD with two judges scoring the bout 99–91 and the third scoring it 98–92.

She bounced back from defeat with four victories in 2019; Karla Islas in May and Heidy Cruz in July, both by technical knockout (TKO); a UD in a rematch with Cruz in October; and a SD (96–92, 96–92, 93–95) against Joana Pastrana on 23 November, capturing the vacant WBC Silver female mini flyweight title at the Pabellón Ciudad Deportiva Navafría in Moralzarzal, Spain.

== Professional boxing record ==
31 fights	23 wins	8 losses
By knockout	6	0
By decision	17	8

No.	Result	Record	Opponent	Type	Round, time	Date	Location	Notes
31	Loss	23–8	(Germany) Tina Rupprecht	SD	10	24 Jul 2021	Hydro-Tech Eisarena, Königsbrunn, Germany	For WBC female mini flyweight title
30	Win	23–7	(Spain) Joana Pastrana	SD	10	23 Nov 2019	Pabellón Ciudad Deportiva Navafría, Moralzarzal, Spain	Won vacant WBC Silver female mini flyweight title
29	Win	22–7	(Mexico) Heidy Cruz	UD	6	18 Oct 2019	Gimnasio Municipal Hilda Gaxiola Alvarez, Guamúchil, Mexico	
28	Win	21–7	(Mexico) Heidy Cruz	TKO	3 (6), 0:31	19 Jul 2019	Los Mochis, Mexico	
27	Win	20–7	(Mexico) Karla Islas	TKO	1 (6), 1:29	3 May 2019	Auditorio Benito Juarez, Los Mochis, Mexico	
26	Loss	19–7	(Mexico) Anabel Ortiz	UD	10	30 Apr 2016	Malecon Turistico, Guaymas, Mexico	For WBA female mini flyweight title
25	Loss	19–6	(Mexico) Kenia Enríquez	TD	5 (8)	13 Nov 2015	Golden Lion Casino, Mexicali, Mexico	TD after Gutierrez cut from accidental head clash
24	Loss	19–5	(Japan) Yuko Kuroki	SD	10	1 Nov 2014	Acros, Fukuoka, Japan	For WBC female mini flyweight title
23	Win	19–4	(Mexico) Brenda Flores	UD	6	11 Apr 2014	Hipódromo Caliente, Tijuana, Mexico	
22	Loss	18–4	(Mexico) Irma Sánchez	SD	10	7 Sep 2013	Casino, Apodaca, Mexico	
21	Win	18–3	(Mexico) Kareli Lopez	UD	8	19 Apr 2012	Arena Union, Los Mochis, Mexico	
20	Win	17–3	(Mexico) Susana Cruz Pérez	UD	10	30 Jun 2012	Auditorio Centenario, Torreón, Mexico	Retained IBF female mini flyweight title
19	Win	16–3	(Philippines) Gretchen Abaniel	TKO	4 (10), 1:57	10 Dec 2011	Estadio Centenario, Los Mochis, Mexico	Retained IBF female mini flyweight title
18	Win	15–3	(Colombia) Olga Julio	UD	10	10 Sep 2011	Universidad Autónoma de Guadalajara, Zapopan, Mexico	Retained IBF female mini flyweight title
17	Win	14–3	(Mexico) Karla Mora	UD	4	2 Aug 2011	Polideportivo Municipal, El Rosario, Mexico	
16	Win	13–3	(Mexico) Ana Arrazola	UD	10	2 Jul 2011	Gimnasio Nuevo León, Monterrey, Mexico	Retained IBF female mini flyweight title
15	Win	12–3	(United States) Hollie Dunaway	UD	10	16 Apr 2011	World Trade Center, Boca del Río, Mexico	Won inaugural IBF female mini flyweight title
14	Loss	11–3	(Mexico) Irma Sánchez	UD	10	22 Jan 2011	Arena Neza, Ciudad Nezahualcóyotl, Mexico	For inaugural IBF female junior flyweight title
13	Win	11–2	(Mexico) Isabel Mejia	UD	10	1 Oct 2010	Polideportivo Centenario, Los Mochis, Mexico	
12	Win	10–2	(Mexico) Martha Cirio	UD	4	31 Jul 2010	Salon Forum, Los Mochis, Mexico	
11	Loss	9–2	(Mexico) Jessica Chávez	MD	8	26 Jun 2010	Estadio Centenario, Los Mochis, Mexico	
10	Win	9–1	(Mexico) Yesenia Martinez Castrejon	SD	6	3 Apr 2010	Coliseo Olimpico de la UG, Guadalajara, Mexico	
9	Win	8–1	(Mexico) Mariela Jiménez Catorce	UD	6	13 Nov 2009	Polideportivo Centenario, Los Mochis, Mexico	
8	Win	7–1	(Mexico) Flor Verdugo	KO	2 (8)	2 Oct 2009	Salon Forum, Los Mochis, Mexico	
7	Win	6–1	(Mexico) Susana Morales	SD	6	12 Jun 2009	Polideportivo Centenario, Los Mochis, Mexico	
6	Win	5–1	(Mexico) Yesenia Martinez Castrejon	UD	10	12 Dec 2008	Salon Forum, Los Mochis, Mexico	
5	Win	4–1	(Mexico) Flor Verdugo	KO	2 (4), 0:37	14 Jun 2008	Auditorio Benito Juarez, Los Mochis, Mexico	
4	Win	3–1	(Mexico) Guadalupe Cortes	SD	4	24 May 2008	Gimnasio La Bola, Guamúchil, Mexico	
3	Win	2–1	(Mexico) Maricela Flores	TKO	3 (4), 2:49	22 Feb 2008	Parque Revolucion, Culiacán, Mexico	
2	Loss	1–1	(Mexico) Jasseth Noriega	UD	4	16 Nov 2007	Gimnasio German Evers, Mazatlán, Mexico	
1	Win	1–0	(Mexico) Guadalupe Cortes	MD	4	10 Aug 2007	Polideportivo Centenario, Los Mochis, Mexico	

Sporting positions
Regional boxing titles
Vacant Title last held by Fabiana Bytyqi	WBC Silver female mini flyweight champion 23 November 2019 – present	Incumbent
World boxing titles
Inaugural champion	IBF female mini flyweight champion 16 April 2011 – 2013	Succeeded by Nancy Franco
