= Ibeth Zamora Silva =

Mexican boxer (born 1989)

Personal information
- Nicknames: La Roca (The Rock); La Guerrera Otomi (The Otomi Warrior)
- Born: 6 February 1989 (age 37) San Cristóbal Huichochitlán, Toluca, Mexico
- Height: 5 ft 2 in (157 cm)
- Weight: Mini flyweight; Light flyweight; Flyweight

Boxing career
- Reach: 65 in (165 cm)
- Stance: Orthodox

Boxing record
- Total fights: 41
- Wins: 33
- Win by KO: 13
- Losses: 8

Ibeth Zamora Silva (pronounced [iˈβeð ˈsilβa]; born 6 February 1989) is a Mexican former professional boxer. She is a two-division world champion, having held the WBC female flyweight title from 2018 to 2021 and previously the WBC light flyweight title from 2013 to 2017, as well as the WBA interim female mini flyweight title from 2009 to 2011.

== Professional career ==
Silva made her professional debut on 5 May 2007, scoring a four-round unanimous decision (UD) victory against Ana Arrazola in Metepec, Mexico. Silva won her next fight via split decision (SD) against Esmeralda Moreno in August, before suffering her first career defeat by majority decision (MD) in a rematch with Moreno for the Mexico interim female flyweight title on 23 February 2008 in Toluca, Mexico. Two judges scored the bout 97–93 while the third scored it a draw at 96–96. Following two points decision (PTS) wins, she defeated Anabel Ortiz via PTS to capture the Mexico female light flyweight title on 21 November 2008 at Salon Marbet Plus in Ciudad Nezahualcóyotl, Mexico.

In her next fight she challenged WBA light flyweight champion Yésica Bopp on 8 August 2009 at Palacio Peñarol in Montevideo, Uruguay. Silva suffered the second defeat of her career via UD, with the scorecards reading 97–93, 99–91 and 99–92. She moved down a weight class for her next fight to capture the WBA interim female mini flyweight title on 5 September at the Roberto Durán Arena in Panama City, Panama, defeating Ana Fernandez via UD with scores of 88–82, 87–83 and 86–84. Silva successfully defended her interim title a month later against Marisol Molina via third-round technical knockout (TKO), before capturing the vacant WBC Youth female mini flyweight title on 24 June 2010, defeating Patricia Hernandez by second-round TKO at the Jose Cuervo Salon in Mexico City. She successfully defended her WBC Youth title three times before facing WBA mini flyweight champion Etsuko Tada on 17 April 2011, at the Yomiuri Bunka Hall in Toyonaka, Japan. Silva lost in her second attempt at a world title with scores of 96–94, 98–93 and 98–92.

Following the defeat to Tada, Silva moved back up to light flyweight to capture the vacant WBC Youth female light flyweight title, defeating Susana Perez via third-round TKO on 11 June at Deportivo Trabajadores del Metro in Mexico City. She defended the title three times before losing it to Jessica Nery Plata by SD on 21 April 2012 at the Estadio José Lerma Pérez in Ocoyoacac, Mexico.

She lost her next fight, again by SD, against Irma Sánchez in June. After a UD win against Fredee Gonzalez in January 2013, she defeated Naoko Shibata by SD to capture the vacant WBC female light flyweight title on 3 March 2013 at the Korakuen Hall in Tokyo, Japan. Two judges scored the bout 96–94 in favour of Silva while the third scored it 96–94 to Shibata. She would go on to defend her WBC light flyweight title eight times; against Maricela Quintero in June and Ava Knight in October 2013; Jessica Chávez in November 2014; Jolene Blackshear in May and a third fight with Esmeralda Moreno in September 2015; Mari Ando in March, Keisher McLeod-Wells in July and Nina Radovanovic in November 2016. Her title reign came to an end when she faced Esmeralda Moreno for the fourth time in her career, on 22 April 2017 at Unidad Deportiva Martín Alarcón in Metepec, Mexico. Two judges scored the bout 95–94 and 96–93 in favour of Moreno while the third scored it 96–93 to Silva.

Six months after losing her WBC light flyweight title, she moved up a division to compete at flyweight, defeating Isabel Millan by UD in October before facing Melissa McMorrow for the vacant WBC female flyweight title. The bout took place on 26 May 2018 at the Teatro Molière in Mexico City. Silva defeated McMorrow by UD to become a two-weight world champion, with the scorecards reading 100–90 and 98–92 twice.

On 19 June 2021, Silva lost her title to Marlen Esparza going down by unanimous decision at Don Haskins Center, El Paso, Texas, USA. She knocked the challenger to the canvas in the first-round but went on to lose with the three judges scoring the contest 97–92, 95–94 and 96–94 for Esparza.

Silva lost to Kenia Enríquez by unanimous decision at La Paz, Baja California Sur, Mexico, on 10 September 2023 in a contest for the interim WBC female flyweight World title.

Having not fought since the Enríquez bout, Silva officially announced her retirement from professional boxing in August 2025.

== Professional boxing record ==
41 fights	33 wins	8 losses
By knockout	13	0
By decision	20	8

No.	Result	Record	Opponent	Type	Round, time	Date	Location	Notes
41	Loss	33–8	(Mexico) Kenia Enríquez	UD	10	10 Sep 2023	La Paz, Baja California Sur, Mexico	For the interim WBC female flyweight title
40	Win	33–7	(Mexico) Jessica Martinez Castillo	TKO	4 (8)	29 Oct 2022	Arena Neza, Ciudad Nezahualcoyotl, Mexico	
39	Loss	32–7	(United States) Marlen Esparza	UD	10	19 Jun 2021	(United States) Don Haskins Center, El Paso, Texas, US	Lost WBC female flyweight title
38	Win	32–6	(Mexico) Gabriela Sanchez Saavedra	UD	10	19 Dec 2020	Cintermex, Monterrey, Mexico	Retained WBC female flyweight title
37	Win	31–6	(Mexico) Edith Flores	UD	8	30 Oct 2020	Salon Marbet Plus, Ciudad Nezahualcóyotl, Mexico	
36	Win	30–6	(Japan) Chaoz Minowa	UD	10	17 Nov 2018	Gimnasio Miguel Hidalgo, Puebla, Mexico	Retained WBC female flyweight title
35	Win	29–6	(United States) Melissa McMorrow	UD	10	26 May 2018	Teatro Moliere, Mexico City, Mexico	Won vacant WBC female flyweight title
34	Win	28–6	(Mexico) Isabel Millan	UD	10	21 Oct 2017	Auditorio Benito Juárez, Zapopan, Mexico	
33	Loss	27–6	(Mexico) Esmeralda Moreno	SD	10	22 Apr 2017	Unidad Deportiva Martín Alarcón, Metepec, Mexico	Lost WBC female light flyweight title
32	win	27–5	(Serbia) Nina Radovanović	TKO	3 (10), 1:17	26 Nov 2016	Gimnasio Municipal, Torreón, Mexico	Retained WBC female light flyweight title
31	Win	26–5	(United States) Keisha Wells	TKO	7 (10), 1:35	16 Jul 2016	Centro de Espectáculos del Recinto Ferial, Metepec, Mexico	Retained WBC female light flyweight title
30	Win	25–5	(Japan) Mari Ando	TKO	6 (10), 0:52	19 Mar 2016	Centro de Espectáculos del Recinto Ferial, Metepec, Mexico	Retained WBC female light flyweight title
29	Win	24–5	(Mexico) Esmeralda Moreno	UD	10	5 Sep 2015	Centro de Espectáculos del Recinto Ferial, Metepec, Mexico	Retained WBC female light flyweight title
28	Win	23–5	(United States) Jolene Blackshear	RTD	6 (10), 2:00	23 May 2015	Centro de Espectáculos del Recinto, Metepec, Mexico	Retained WBC female light flyweight title
27	Win	22–5	(Mexico) Suri Tapia	UD	10	21 Mar 2015	Centro de Convenciones, Tlalnepantla, Mexico	
26	Win	21–5	(Mexico) Jessica Chávez	UD	10	22 Nov 2014	Plaza de los Martíres, Toluca, Mexico	Retained WBC female light flyweight title
25	Win	20–5	(Mexico) Judith Rodriguez	UD	8	5 Apr 2014	Gran Estadio, Delicias, Mexico	
24	Win	19–5	(United States) Ava Knight	UD	10	26 Oct 2013	Deportivo Agustín Ramos Millan, Toluca, Mexico	Retained WBC female light flyweight title
23	Win	18–5	(Mexico) Marciela Quintero	RTD	8 (10), 2:00	29 Jun 2013	Unidad Deportiva López Mateos, Apatzingán, Mexico	Retained WBC female light flyweight title
22	Win	17–5	(Japan) Naoko Shibata	SD	10	3 Mar 2013	Korakuen Hall, Tokyo, Japan	Won vacant WBC female light flyweight title
21	Win	16–5	(Mexico) Fredee Gonzalez	UD	8	12 Jan 2013	Deportivo del Sindicato del Metro, Mexico City, Mexico	
20	Loss	15–5	(Mexico) Irma Sánchez	SD	10	2 Jun 2012	Coliseo Olimpico de la UG, Guadalajara, Mexico	
19	Loss	15–4	(Mexico) Jessica Nery Plata	SD	10	21 Apr 2012	Estadio José Lerma Pérez, Ocoyoacac, Mexico	Retained WBC Youth female light flyweight title
18	Win	15–3	(Mexico) Guadalupe Bautista	UD	10	3 Mar 2012	Deportivo Trabajadores del Metro, Mexico City, Mexico	Retained WBC Youth female light flyweight title
17	Win	14–3	(Mexico) Tania Cosme	RTD	5 (10), 2:00	22 Oct 2011	Deportivo Trabajadores del Metro, Mexico City, Mexico	Retained WBC Youth female light flyweight title
16	Win	13–3	(Panama) Yacksury Gordan	TKO	3 (10), 1:26	13 Aug 2011	Deportivo Tlalli, Tlalnepantla de Baz, Mexico	Retained WBC Youth female light flyweight title
15	Win	12–3	(Mexico) Susana Cruz Perez	TKO	3 (10), 0:48	11 Jun 2011	Deportivo Trabajadores del Metro, Mexico City, Mexico	Won vacant WBC Youth female light flyweight title
14	Loss	11–3	(Japan) Etsuko Tada	UD	10	17 Apr 2011	Yomiuri Bunka Hall, Toyonaka, Japan	For WBA female mini flyweight title
13	Win	11–2	(Mexico) Nancy Franco	TKO	6 (10), 0:57	8 Jan 2011	Arena Coliseo, Mexico City, Mexico	Retained WBC Youth female mini flyweight title
12	Win	10–2	(Mexico) Mayela Perez	TKO	5 (10), 1:41	16 Oct 2010	Deportivo Trabajadores del Metro, Mexico City, Mexico	Retained WBC Youth female mini flyweight title
11	Win	9–2	(Mexico) Linda Sanchez	MD	10	17 Jul 2010	Palenque de la Feria, Tuxtla Gutiérrez, Mexico	Retained WBC Youth female mini flyweight title
10	Win	8–2	(Mexico) Patricia Hernandez	TKO	2 (10), 1:12	24 Jun 2010	Jose Cuervo Salon, Mexico City, Mexico	Retained WBA interim female mini flyweight title; Won vacant WBC Youth female mini flyweight title
9	Win	7–2	(Mexico) Marisol Molina	TKO	3 (10), 1:50	31 Oct 2009	Gimnasio Del Imcufide, Toluca, Mexico	Retained WBA interim female mini flyweight title
8	Win	6–2	(Venezuela) Ana Fernandez	UD	9	5 Sep 2009	Roberto Durán Arena, Panama City, Panama	Won vacant WBA interim female mini flyweight title
7	Loss	5–2	(Argentina) Yésica Bopp	UD	10	8 Aug 2009	Palacio Peñarol, Montevideo, Uruguay	For WBA female light flyweight title
6	Win	5–1	(Mexico) Anabel Ortiz	PTS	10	21 Nov 2008	Salon Marbet Plus, Ciudad Nezahualcóyotl, Mexico	Won Mexico female light flyweight title
5	Win	4–1	(Mexico) Jessica Chavez	PTS	6	7 Jun 2008	Toluca, Mexico	
4	Win	3–1	(Japan) Momoko Kanada	PTS	4	26 Apr 2008	Frontón El Gato, San Mateo Atenco, Mexico	
3	Loss	2–1	(Mexico) Esmeralda Moreno	MD	10	23 Feb 2008	Toluca, Mexico	For Mexico interim female flyweight title
2	Win	2–0	(Mexico) Esmeralda Moreno	SD	6	2 Aug 2007	Vive Cuervo Salon, Mexico City, Mexico	
1	Win	1–0	(Mexico) Ana Arrazola	UD	4	5 May 2007	Metepec, Mexico	
