= Melissa McMorrow =

American boxer (born 1981)

Personal information
- Nickname: Mighty Poderosa
- Born: Melissa McMorrow Ramalho; June 19, 1981 (age 45) Palo Alto, California, U.S.
- Height: 5 ft 1 1/2 in (156 cm)
- Weight: Flyweight; Super flyweight

Boxing career
- Reach: 62 in (157 cm)
- Stance: Orthodox

Boxing record
- Total fights: 20
- Wins: 10
- Win by KO: 1
- Losses: 7
- Draws: 3

Melissa McMorrow Ramalho (born June 19, 1981) is an American professional boxer and architect.

== Professional career ==
McMorrow is a former two-time WBO female flyweight champion, having held the title from 2012 to 2013, during which time she also held the WIBF flyweight title, and again in 2015. She also challenged for the WBA interim female flyweight title in 2012 and the WBC female flyweight title in 2018. McMorrow was inducted into the International Women's Boxing Hall of Fame in 2023.

== Professional boxing record ==
20 fights	10 wins	7 losses
By knockout	1	0
By decision	9	7
Draws	3	

No.	Result	Record	Opponent	Type	Round, time	Date	Location	Notes
20	Loss	10–7–3	Ibeth Zamora Silva	UD	10	May 26, 2018	Teatro Moliere, Mexico City, Mexico	For vacant WBC flyweight title
19	Loss	10–6–3	Esmeralda Moreno	UD	10	Oct 22, 2016	Arena Coliseo, Mexico City, Mexico	
18	Win	10–5–3	Kenia Enríquez	SD	10	Feb 28, 2015	Centro De Convenciones, Rosarito, Mexico	Won WBO flyweight title
17	Loss	9–5–3	Yessica Chávez	UD	10	Aug 23, 2014	Convention Center Surman Villa de las Flores, Coacalco, Mexico	For vacant WBC International flyweight title
16	Loss	9–4–3	Mariana Juárez	UD	10	Feb 22, 2014	Gimnasio Miguel Hidalgo, Puebla, Mexico	For WBC International super-flyweight title
15	Win	9–3–3	Nadia Raoui	SD	10	Mar 23, 2013	GETEC Arena, Magdeburg, Germany	Retained WBO and WIBF flyweight titles
14	Win	8–3–3	Yahaira Martinez	TKO	9 (10), 1:29	Oct 19, 2012	Civic Center, Kissimmee, Florida, U.S.	Retained WBO flyweight title
13	Win	7–3–3	Susi Kentikian	MD	10	May 16, 2012	Brandenburg Halle, Frankfurt, Germany	Won WBO and WIBF flyweight titles
12	Loss	6–3–3	Arely Muciño	SD	10	Feb 25, 2012	Coliseo Olimpico de la UG, Guadalajara, Mexico	For WBA interim flyweight title
11	Win	6–2–3	Keisher McLeod Wells	SD	8	Jul 30, 2011	Aviator Sports and Events Center, New York City, New York, U.S.	Retained USA New York State flyweight title
10	Win	5–2–3	Eileen Olszewski	SD	8	Jun 24, 2011	Cordon Bleu, New York City, New York, U.S.	Won vacant USA New York State flyweight title
9	Loss	4–2–3	Keisher McLeod Wells	UD	6	Feb 9, 2011	BB King Blues Club & Grill, New York City, New York, U.S.	
8	Win	4–1–3	Gloria Salas	UD	6	May 13, 2010	Hyatt Regency Hotel, Irvine, California, U.S.	
7	Draw	3–1–3	Amaris Quintana	PTS	6	Apr 8, 2010	Four Points Sheraton Hotel, San Diego, California, U.S.	
6	Draw	3–1–2	Gloria Salas	MD	4	Dec 4, 2009	HP Pavilion, San Jose, California, U.S.	
5	Draw	3–1–1	Amaris Quintana	MD	4	Jun 4, 2009	Four Points Sheraton Hotel, San Diego, California, U.S.	
4	Win	3–1	Suzannah Warner	MD	6	May 14, 2009	Hyatt Regency Hotel, Irvine, California, U.S.	
3	Loss	2–1	Jolene Blackshear	MD	4	May 7, 2009	HP Pavilion, San Jose, California, U.S.	
2	Win	2–0	Gloria Salas	UD	4	Nov 20, 2008	HP Pavilion, San Jose, California, U.S.	
1	Win	1–0	Mayela Perez	UD	4	Jun 25, 2008	Playboy Mansion, Beverly Hills, California, U.S.	

== See also ==
- List of female boxers
- International Women's Boxing Hall of Fame

Sporting positions
Regional boxing titles
New title	USA New York State flyweight champion June 24, 2011 – May 16, 2012; Won world title	Vacant Title next held by Patricia Alcivar
Minor world boxing titles
Preceded by Susi Kentikian	WIBF flyweight champion May 16, 2012 – 2013; Vacated	Vacant Title next held by Eva Voraberger
Major world boxing titles
Preceded by Susi Kentikian	WBO flyweight champion May 16, 2012 – 2014; Vacated	Vacant Title next held by Yésica Bopp
Preceded by Kenia Enríquez	WBO flyweight champion February 28, 2015 – 2016; Vacated	Vacant Title next held by Nana Nogami
