= María Milano =

Venezuelan boxer (born 1987)

Personal information
- Born: María Trinidad Milano Carrillo; 5 December 1987 (age 38) San Juan de los Morros, Venezuela
- Weight: Atomweight; Mini-flyweight; Light-flyweight

Boxing career

Boxing record
- Total fights: 19
- Wins: 13
- Win by KO: 7
- Losses: 4
- Draws: 2

María Trinidad Milano Carrillo (born 5 December 1987) is a Venezuelan professional boxer who held the WBA female atomweight title in 2018.

== Professional career ==
Milano made her professional debut on 8 August 2014, defeating Iliana Bonilla by unanimous decision. She would amass a record of 5–1–1 over the next two years before challenging undefeated prospect Rocio Gaspar for the vacant WBA interim female atomweight title. In an upset, she defeated Gaspar by split decision to claim the title. After holding the title for a little over a year, Milano was elevated to full champion on 3 March 2018 before being stripped later that year due to inactivity.

Milano moved up to mini-flyweight and challenged Anabel Ortiz for the WBA female mini-flyweight title. She lost the fight by unanimous decision.

== Professional boxing record ==
19 fights	13 wins	4 losses
By knockout	7	2
By decision	6	2
Draws	2	

No.	Result	Record	Opponent	Type	Round, time	Date	Location	Notes
19	Loss	13–4–2	Cristina Navarro	KO	1 (10), 0:58	14 Jun 2025	Pabellón Siglo XXI, Zaragoza, Spain	For vacant WBA Ibero-American female mini-flyweight title
18	Win	13–3–2	Dayerlin Montenegro	TKO	2 (6), 0:33	31 May 2025	Gimnasio Bernardo Pinango, Ciudad Caribia, Venezuela	
17	Draw	12–3–2	Luisa Bello	UD	4	17 Jun 2022	Casa de la Cultura, San Antonio de Los Altos, Venezuela	
16	Loss	12–3–1	Estefania Matute	MD	4	27 Nov 2021	Centro Recreacional Yesterday, Turmero, Venezuela	
15	Win	12–2–1	Marian Gonzalez	KO	3 (4), 0:35	14 Mar 2020	Centro Recreacional Yesterday, Turmero, Venezuela	
14	Win	11–2–1	Yanetsy Gomez	TKO	3 (4), 0:52	19 Oct 2019	Centro Recreacional Yesterday, Turmero, Venezuela	
13	Loss	10–2–1	Anabel Ortiz	UD	10	31 Aug 2019	Arena La Paz, La Paz, Mexico	For WBA female mini-flyweight title
12	Win	10–1–1	Estefania Matute	UD	8	11 May 2019	Centro Recreacional Yesterday, Turmero, Venezuela	
11	Win	9–1–1	Mirleny Zambrano	KO	2 (6), 0:46	15 Feb 2019	Centro Olimpico, San Juan de los Morros, Venezuela	
10	Win	8–1–1	Endrimar Pirona	MD	8	29 Sep 2017	San Juan de los Morros, Venezuela	
9	Win	7–1–1	Rocio Gaspar	SD	10	10 Dec 2016	Parque de las Aguas, Lima, Peru	Won vacant WBA interim female atomweight title
8	Win	6–1–1	Ysmery Diaz	TKO	2 (6), 0:25	3 Dec 2016	El Domo, San Juan de los Morros, Venezuela	
7	Win	5–1–1	Angie Bejarano	MD	4	14 Jun 2016	Gimnasio Palacio del Deporte, Los Teques, Venezuela	
6	Win	4–1–1	Yuneska Sulbaran	TKO	2 (4), 1:31	23 Apr 2016	Centro Recreacional Yesterday, Turmero, Venezuela	
5	Win	3–1–1	Miguelis Castillo	TKO	1 (4), 0:54	3 Oct 2015	Centro Recreacional Yesterday, Turmero, Venezuela	
4	Loss	2–1–1	Debora Rengifo	TKO	6 (6), 0:36	30 May 2015	Centro Recreacional Yesterday, Turmero, Venezuela	
3	Win	2–0–1	Iliana Bonilla	UD	4	17 Oct 2014	Gimnasio de los Leones, Panama City, Panama	
2	Draw	1–0–1	Nataly Delgado	MD	4	4 Oct 2014	Gimnasio Municipal, Panama City, Panama	
1	Win	1–0	Iliana Bonilla	UD	4	8 Aug 2014	Gimnasio Yuyin Luzcando, Panama City, Panama	

== See also ==
- List of female boxers
- Boxing in Venezuela
