= Asley González (boxer) =

Mexican boxer (born 1993)

Personal information
- Nickname: La Chiquita ("The Little Girl")
- Born: Asley González Macías; July 1, 1993 (age 33) Tepic, Nayarit, Mexico
- Weight: Flyweight; Super-flyweight

Boxing career
- Stance: Orthodox

Boxing record
- Total fights: 19
- Wins: 17
- Win by KO: 7
- Losses: 2

Asley González Macías (born July 1, 1993) is a Mexican professional boxer. She held the WBC female super-flyweight title from 2022 until 2025.

== Professional career ==
González turned professional in 2016 and compiled a record of 14–2 before defeating defending champion Lourdes Juárez via majority decision to win the WBC female super-flyweight title in Tepic, Mexico, on 1 October 2022.

On 25 March 2023, she defended the title in a rematch with Juarez, again held in Tepic, this time winning the bout by split decision.

González made her second title defense against Mary Romero at Grand Elysée in Hamburg, Germany, on 12 December 2024, holding onto the belt with a unanimous decision win.

She vacated the title in 2025 due to injury.

== Professional boxing record ==
19 fights	17 wins	2 losses
By knockout	7	0
By decision	10	2

No.	Result	Record	Opponent	Type	Round, time	Date	Location	Notes
19	Win	17–2	Mary Romero	UD	10 (10)	2024-12-12	Grand Elysée, Hamburg, Germany	Retained WBC super-flyweight title
18	Win	16–2	Lourdes Juárez	SD	10 (10)	2023-03-25	Tepic, Mexico	Retained WBC super-flyweight title
17	Win	15–2	Lourdes Juárez	MD	10 (10)	2022-10-01	Tepic, Mexico	Won WBC super-flyweight title
16	Win	14–2	Jessica Rangel Gonzalez	PTS	8 (8)	2022-04-08	Xalisco, Mexico	
15	Win	13–2	Ivoon Rosas Merino	UD	8 (8)	2021-12-15	Gimnasio Nuevo León, Monterrey, Mexico	
14	Win	12–2	Barbara Martinez Munoz	TKO	7 (8)	2021-08-26	Arena José Sulaimán, Monterrey, Mexico	
13	Win	11–2	Maria Guadalupe Atilano Gomez	TKO	6 (8)	2021-05-14	Gimnasio Mario J. Montemayor, San Nicolás de los Garza, Mexico	
12	Loss	10–2	Maria Salinas	SD	10 (10)	2021-02-25	Cintermex, Monterrey, Mexico	For vacant NABF flyweight title
11	Win	10–1	Naylea Gil Sanabia	TKO	1 (6)	2019-09-06	Auditorio del Estado, Mexicali, Mexico	
10	Win	9–1	Cristina Cardiel	RTD	1 (6)	2019-07-20	Domo del Parque de la Solidaridad, Tonalá, Mexico	
9	Loss	8–1	Marilyn Badillo Amaya	SD	4 (4)	2019-05-11	Auditorio Fausto Gutierrez Moreno, Tijuana, Mexico	
8	Win	8–0	Itzel Reyes Grijalva	UD	6 (6)	2019-02-16	Palenque de la Feria, Tepic, Mexico	
7	Win	7–0	Jocelyn Garcia	UD	4 (4)	2018-12-21	Palenque de la Feria, Tepic, Mexico	
6	Win	6–0	Lucia Gutierrez Campos	UD	6 (6)	2018-08-25	Palenque de la Feria, Tepic, Mexico	
5	Win	5–0	Erika Tristan	TKO	1 (4)	2018-04-28	Palenque de la Feria, Tepic, Mexico	
4	Win	4–0	Aholibama Ramon Alvarez	UD	4 (4)	2018-02-23	Palenque de la Feria, Tepic, Mexico	
3	Win	3–0	Alejandra Gonzalez	UD	4 (4)	2017-09-01	Palenque de la Feria, Tepic, Mexico	
2	Win	2–0	Fatima Gomez	TKO	1 (4)	2017-07-01	Arena Jalisco, Guadalajara, Mexico	
1	Win	1–0	Danira Navarrete	KO	4 (4)	2016-11-18	Palenque de la Feria, Tepic, Mexico	

== See also ==
- List of female boxers

Sporting positions
World boxing titles
Preceded by Lourdes Juárez	WBC super-flyweight champion 1 October 2022 – 2025; Vacated	Vacant Title next held by Adelaida Ruiz
