= Anabel Ortiz =

Mexican boxer (born 1986)

Personal information
- Nickname: Avispa
- Born: Anabel Ortiz Morales; 5 July 1986 (age 40) Tepic, Mexico
- Height: 5 ft 0 in (152 cm)
- Weight: Atomweight; Mini-flyweight; Light-flyweight; Flyweight; Super-flyweight

Boxing career
- Reach: 62 1/2 in (159 cm)
- Stance: Orthodox

Boxing record
- Total fights: 43
- Wins: 34
- Win by KO: 4
- Losses: 9

Anabel Ortiz Morales (born 5 July 1986) is a Mexican professional boxer. She is a two-time mini flyweight world champion, having held the WBA title since 2013 and previously the WBC title from 2009 to 2011. She also challenged once for the unified WBA, and WBO light flyweight titles in 2012.

== Professional boxing career ==
Ortiz won the WBC female mini flyweight title in November 2009 with a unanimous decision (96–94, 96–94, 97–93) defeat of Caroline Moreno and defended it against Nanako Kikuchi in September 2010 before losing the title to Naoko Fujioka in May 2011. Ortiz was knocked down twice by Fujioka during the match, and lost by TKO. She fought Yésica Bopp for the WBA and WBO light flyweight titles in May 2012, but was unsuccessful.

A split decision victory over Etsuko Tada in July 2013 saw Ortiz gain the WBA female mini flyweight title. She retained the title in matches against Hye Soo Park in November 2013, Neisi Torres in July 2014, and Tada in November 2014. 2015 saw Ortiz keep hold of the title against Nana Yoshikawa in April (unanimous decision) and again against Sandra Robles in September (six round technical decision). She also beat Suri Tapia in November.

Ortiz continued her winning streak into 2016 with further successful defences against Katia Gutiérrez in April, Jolene Blackshear in June and Debora Rengifo in October. She remained undefeated into 2020, seeing off title challenges from Nancy Franco in 2017, from Yenifer Leon in 2018, and Maria Milano in 2019. All of her wins from 2016 to 2019 were by unanimous decision except against Blackshear, which was a win by TKO. A non-title defeat of Brenda Ramos in January 2020 was Ortiz's 14th consecutive victory, and bought her record to 24–3 including four knockouts.

Her boxing nickname is Avispa. She has two daughters.

Ortiz challenged WBA (Regular) female light-flyweight champion Sara Bailey in Toronto on 12 December 2024, losing by unanimous decision.

== Professional boxing record ==
| 43 fights | 34 wins | 9 losses |
|---|---|---|
| By knockout | 4 | 1 |
| By decision | 30 | 8 |

| No. | Result | Record | Opponent | Type | Round, time | Date | Location | Notes |
|---|---|---|---|---|---|---|---|---|
| 43 | Loss | 34–9 | Carolina Ferrari | SD | 6 | 18 Jul 2025 | Boxing Club, Río Gallegos, Argentina | |
| 42 | Loss | 34–8 | Kim Clavel | UD | 10 | 27 Feb 2025 | Montreal Casino, Montreal, Canada | For vacant IBF Inter-Continental and WBC International female mini-flyweight titles |
| 41 | Loss | 34–7 | Sara Bailey | UD | 10 | 12 Dec 2024 | Great Canadian Casino Resort, Toronto, Ontario, Canada | For WBA (Regular) female light-flyweight title |
| 40 | Win | 34–6 | Monserrat Alarcón | UD | 10 | 31 Aug 2024 | Foro Oceanía Show Center, Mexico City, Mexico | |
| 39 | Loss | 33–6 | Yokasta Valle | UD | 10 | 4 Nov 2023 | Polideportivo de Cartago, Cartago, Costa Rica | For IBF and WBO female mini-flyweight titles |
| 38 | Win | 33–5 | Maria Micheo Santizo | UD | 8 | 20 Oct 2022 | Fantasy Springs Resort Casino, Indio, California, U.S. | |
| 37 | Win | 32–5 | Cindy Chavez | UD | 8 | 10 Sep 2022 | Arena Neza, Ciudad Nezahualcóyotl, Mexico | |
| 36 | Loss | 31–5 | Marlen Esparza | UD | 10 | 18 Dec 2021 | AT&T Center, San Antonio, Texas, U.S. | For WBC female flyweight title |
| 35 | Loss | 31–4 | Seniesa Estrada | UD | 10 | 20 Mar 2021 | Dickies Arena, Fort Worth, Texas, U.S. | Lost WBA female mini-flyweight title |
| 34 | Win | 31–3 | Heidy Cruz | UD | 6 | 7 Mar 2020 | Gimnasio Nuevo, Parral, Mexico | |
| 33 | Win | 30–3 | Maria Milano | UD | 10 | 31 Aug 2019 | Arena La Paz, La Paz, Mexico | Retained WBA female mini-flyweight title |
| 32 | Win | 29–3 | Barbara Munoz | UD | 8 | 18 May 2019 | Deportivo del Sindicato del Metro, Mexico City, Mexico | |
| 31 | Win | 28–3 | Yenifer León | UD | 10 | 18 Aug 2018 | Club Britania, Chihuahua City, Mexico | Retained WBA female mini-flyweight title |
| 30 | Win | 27–3 | Debora Rengifo | UD | 10 | 24 Mar 2018 | Domo Sindicato de Trabajadores IMSS, Mexico City, Mexico | Retained WBA female mini-flyweight title |
| 29 | Win | 26–3 | Esmerelda Torres Ramirez | UD | 10 | 25 Nov 2017 | Domo Sindicato de Trabajadores IMSS, Mexico City, Mexico | |
| 28 | Win | 25–3 | Nancy Franco | UD | 10 | 29 Jul 2017 | Domo Sindicato de Trabajadores IMSS, Mexico City, Mexico | Retained WBA female mini-flyweight title |
| 27 | Win | 24–3 | Brenda Ramos | UD | 10 | 21 Jan 2017 | Deportivo Benito Juárez, Mexico City, Mexico | |
| 26 | Win | 23–3 | Debora Rengifo | UD | 10 | 15 Oct 2016 | Deportivo G2, Mexico City, Mexico | Retained WBA female mini-flyweight title |
| 25 | Win | 22–3 | Kareli Lopez | UD | 8 | 16 Jul 2016 | Polideportivo Soraya Jimenez, La Paz, Mexico | |
| 24 | Win | 21–3 | Jolene Blackshear | TKO | 8 (10) | 18 Jun 2016 | Auditorio Fausto Gutierrez Moreno, Tijuana, Mexico | Retained WBA female mini-flyweight title |
| 23 | Win | 20–3 | Katia Gutiérrez | UD | 10 | 30 Apr 2016 | Malecon Turistico, Guaymas, Mexico | Retained WBA female mini-flyweight title |
| 22 | Win | 19–3 | Suri Tapia | UD | 10 | 28 Nov 2015 | Arena Tequisquiapan, Tequisquiapan, Mexico | |
| 21 | Win | 18–3 | Sandra Robles | TD | 6 (10) | 5 Sep 2015 | Gran Teatro Moliere, Mexico City, Mexico | Retained WBA female mini-flyweight title |
| 20 | Win | 17–3 | Nana Nogami | UD | 10 | 29 Apr 2015 | Sangyo Shinko Center, Sakai, Japan | Retained WBA female mini-flyweight title |
| 19 | Win | 16–3 | Etsuko Tada | SD | 10 | 8 Nov 2014 | Auditorio General Arteaga, Querétaro, Mexico | Retained WBA female mini-flyweight title |
| 18 | Win | 15–3 | Neisi Torres | TKO | 3 (10), 1:56 | 26 Jul 2014 | Centro de Espectaculos, Epazoyucan, Mexico | Retained WBA female mini-flyweight title |
| 17 | Win | 14–3 | Ivoon Rosas Merino | UD | 10 | 12 Apr 2014 | Oasis Hotel Complex, Cancún, Mexico | |
| 16 | Win | 13–3 | Park Hye-soo | UD | 10 | 19 Nov 2013 | Grand Hotel, Jeju City, South Korea | Retained WBA female mini-flyweight title |
| 15 | Win | 12–3 | Etsuko Tada | SD | 10 | 23 Jul 2013 | Tokyo Big Sight, Tokyo, Japan | Won WBA female mini-flyweight title |
| 14 | Win | 11–3 | Lorena Arias | UD | 8 | 25 Aug 2012 | Auditorio Municipal, Torreón, Mexico | |
| 13 | Loss | 10–3 | Yésica Bopp | UD | 10 | 24 May 2012 | Estadio F.A.B., Buenos Aires, Argentina | For WBA and WBO female light-flyweight titles |
| 12 | Win | 10–2 | Susana Cruz Perez | TKO | 5 (10) | 21 Apr 2012 | Unidad Deportiva Centenario, Morelia, Mexico | Retained WBC Silver female mini-flyweight title |
| 11 | Win | 9–2 | Ivoon Rosas Merino | UD | 10 | 14 Oct 2011 | Salon Marbet Plus, Ciudad Nezahualcóyotl, Mexico | Won vacant WBC Silver female mini-flyweight title |
| 10 | Loss | 8–2 | Naoko Fujioka | RTD | 8 (10), 2:00 | 8 May 2011 | Korakuen Hall, Tokyo, Japan | Lost WBC female mini-flyweight title |
| 9 | Win | 8–1 | Nanako Kikuchi | UD | 10 | 13 Sep 2010 | Korakuen Hall, Tokyo, Japan | Retained WBC female mini-flyweight title |
| 8 | Win | 7–1 | Yesenia Martinez Castrejon | UD | 6 | 30 Jan 2010 | Auditorio Siglo XXI, Puebla, Mexico | |
| 7 | Win | 6–1 | Carina Moreno | UD | 10 | 31 Oct 2009 | Gimnasio Del Imcufide, Toluca, Mexico | Won WBC female mini-flyweight title |
| 6 | Win | 5–1 | Anahi Torres | UD | 4 | 23 Aug 2009 | Salon 21, Mexico City, Mexico | |
| 5 | Loss | 4–1 | Ibeth Zamora Silva | PTS | 10 | 21 Nov 2008 | Salon Marbet Plus, Ciudad Nezahualcóyotl, Mexico | Lost Mexican female light-flyweight title |
| 4 | Win | 4–0 | Mayela Perez | UD | 10 | 22 Jun 2007 | Tepic, Mexico | |
| 3 | Win | 3–0 | Delia Lopez | UD | 10 | 30 Mar 2007 | Salón de Eventos Los Fresnos, Tepic, Mexico | Won vacant Mexican female light-flyweight title |
| 2 | Win | 2–0 | Lucia Avalos | KO | 4 (6) | 10 Feb 2007 | Salón de Eventos Los Fresnos, Tepic, Mexico | |
| 1 | Win | 1–0 | Cristina Aguilar | UD | 4 | 12 Jan 2007 | Plaza de la Unidad del PRI, Toluca, Mexico | |
