= Yésica Bopp =

Argentine boxer (born 1984)

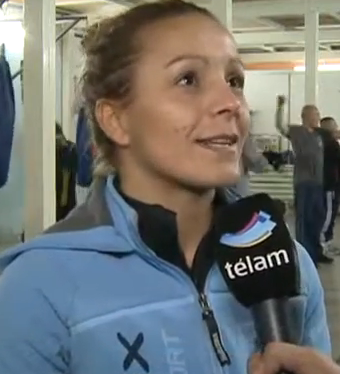
- Bopp in 2013

Personal information
- Nickname: La Tuti
- Born: Yésica Yolanda Bopp; 11 April 1984 (age 42) Wilde, Buenos Aires, Argentina
- Height: 5 ft 0 in (152 cm)
- Weight: Light flyweight; Flyweight

Boxing career
- Stance: Orthodox

Boxing record
- Total fights: 42
- Wins: 39
- Win by KO: 17
- Losses: 3
Medal record
Women's Amateur boxing
Representing Argentina
World Championships
Silver medal – second place	2006 New Delhi	Light flyweight
Bronze medal – third place	2005 Podolsk	Light flyweight

Yésica Yolanda Bopp (born 11 April 1984) is an Argentine professional boxer.

== Professional career ==
She is a two-division world champion, having held the WBA and WBO female light-flyweight titles and the WBO female flyweight title during her career.

=== Vs. Daniela Romina Bermúdez ===
Bopp became a two-weight division champion when she captured that vacant WBO flyweight title by defeating compatriot Daniela Romina Bermudez via unanimous decision.

=== Vs. Jessica Nery Plata ===
After a thirteen year reign Bopp was dethroned of her WBA light-flyweight title by interim champion Jessica Nery.

== Professional boxing record ==
42 fights	39 wins	3 losses
By knockout	17	0
By decision	22	3

No.	Result	Record	Opponent	Type	Round, time	Date	Location	Notes
42	Win	39–3	Roxana Maria Colmenarez	UD	10	16 Dec 2023	Racing Club, Avellaneda, Argentina	Won vacant WBO Latino light-flyweight title
41	Win	38–3	Graciela Cortes Aguilar	MD	10	20 Oct 2023	Auditorio Municipal, Tijuana, Mexico	
40	Loss	37–3	Jessica Nery Plata	SD	10	11 Mar 2022	Majestic Casino, Panama City, Panama	Lost WBA light-flyweight (Super) title
39	Win	37–2	Johana Zuniga	TKO	4 (10), 1:35	22 Oct 2021	Coliseo Sugar Baby Rojas, Barranquilla, Colombia	Retained WBA light-flyweight (Super) title
38	Loss	36–2	Juliana Vanesa Basualdo	SD	6	17 Sep 2021	Espacios Deportivos, Posadas, Argentina	
37	Win	36–2	Gabriela Sánchez	TKO	10	15 Jun 2019	Estadio Federación Argentina de Box, Buenos Aires, Argentina	Retained WBA light-flyweight title
36	Win	35–1	Sandra Robles	TKO	10 (10), 0:58	13 Oct 2018	Estadio José María Gatica, Villa Domínico, Argentina	Retained WBA light-flyweight title
35	Win	34–1	Soledad del Valle	TKO	6 (10)	6 Apr 2018	Estadio José María Gatica, Villa Domínico, Argentina	Retained WBA light-flyweight title
34	Win	33–1	Debora Rengifo	TKO	7 (10), 0:56	17 Nov 2017	Estadio José María Gatica, Villa Domínico, Argentina	Retained WBA light-flyweight title
33	Win	32–1	Olga Julio	UD	10	12 Aug 2017	Palacio Peñarol, Montevideo, Uruguay	Retained WBA light-flyweight title
32	Win	31–1	Luna del Mar Torroba	RTD	8 (10), 2:00	22 Apr 2017	Estadio polideportivo Club Chacarita Jrs., Azul, Argentina	Retained WBA light-flyweight title
31	Win	30–1	Anahi Torres	UD	10	12 Nov 2016	Polideportivo municipal, Termas de Río Hondo, Argentina	Retained WBA light-flyweight title
30	Win	29–1	Nancy Franco	UD	10	18 Jun 2016	Polideportivo José María Vargas, La Guaira, Venezuela	Retained WBA light-flyweight title
29	Win	28–1	Vanesa Lorena Taborda	UD	8	8 Apr 2016	Estadio José María Gatica, Villa Dominico, Argentina	
28	Win	27–1	Daniela Romina Bermúdez	UD	10	26 Apr 2014	Polideportivo Carlos Magalot, Río Grande, Argentina	Won vacant WBO flyweight champion
27	Win	26–1	Ana Fernandez	TKO	2 (10), 0:47	6 Dec 2013	Club Los Padres Capuchinos, Concordia, Argentina	Retained WBA and WBO light-flyweight titles
26	Win	25–1	Anastasia Toktaulova	UD	10	19 Jul 2013	Racing Club, Avellaneda, Argentina	Retained WBA and WBO light-flyweight titles
25	Loss	24–1	Yessica Chávez	UD	10	1 Jun 2013	Centro Civico de Ecatepec, Ecatepec, Mexico	For WBC Silver light-flyweight title
24	Win	24–0	Carolina Alvarez	RTD	6 (10), 2:00	16 Mar 2013	Club Los Padres Capuchinos, Concordia, Argentina	Retained WBA and WBO light-flyweight titles
23	Win	23–0	Marisa Johanna Portillo	TD	10	26 Jan 2013	Polideportivo Municipal, Monte Hermoso, Argentina	Retained WBA and WBO light-flyweight titles
22	Win	22–0	Marisol Miranda	TKO	7 (10), 1:02	27 Sep 2012	Hotel San Juan, Isla Verde, Puerto Rico	Retained WBO light-flyweight title
21	Win	21–0	Yesenia Martinez Castrejon	UD	10	4 Aug 2012	Foro Polanco, Mexico City, Mexico	Retained WBO light-flyweight title
20	Win	20–0	Anabel Ortiz	UD	10	24 May 2012	Estadio F.A.B., Buenos Aires, Argentina	Retained WBA and WBO light-flyweight title
19	Win	19–0	Olga Julio	KO	2 (10), 1:36	9 Dec 2011	Salón de los Bomberos Voluntarios, General Villegas, Argentina	Retained WBO light-flyweight title
18	Win	18–0	Suzannah Warner	TKO	1 (10), 1:21	29 Oct 2011	Mario Morales Coliseum, Guaynabo, Puerto Rico	Retained WBO light-flyweight title
17	Win	17–0	Daniela Romina Bermúdez	UD	10	24 Sep 2012	Polideportivo Posta del Retamo, Junín, Argentina	Retained WBA light-flyweight title
16	Win	16–0	Yesenia Martinez Castrejon	TKO	9 (10), 1:48	11 Jun 2011	Estadio Luna Park, Buenos Aires, Argentina	Retained WBA and WBO light-flyweight titles
15	Win	15–0	Romina Elizabeth Alcantra	TKO	8 (8), 0:14	2 Apr 2011	Estadio Socios Fundadores, Comodoro Rivadavia, Argentina	
14	Win	14–0	Carina Moreno	UD	10	29 Jan 2011	Polideportivo Municipal, Monte Hermoso, Argentina	Retained WBA and WBO light-flyweight titles
13	Win	13–0	Ana Arrazola	UD	10	14 Aug 2010	Club Deportivo Libertad, Sunchales, Argentina	Retained WBA and WBO light-flyweight titles
12	Win	12–0	Diana Gonzalez	KO	2 (10), 0:20	13 Mar 2010	Estadio José María Gatica, Villa Domínico, Argentina	Retained WBA light-flyweight title
11	Win	11–0	Ana Arrazola	UD	10	6 Nov 2009	Polideportivo Delmi, Salta, Argentina	Retained WBA light-flyweight title; Won inaugural WBO light-flyweight title
10	Win	10–0	Ibeth Zamora Silva	UD	10	8 Aug 2009	Palacio Peñarol, Montevideo, Uruguay	Retained WBA light-flyweight title
9	Win	9–0	Paulina Cardona	TKO	2 (10), 1:12	20 Jun 2009	Club Deportivo Libertad, Sunchales, Argentina	Retained WBA light-flyweight title
8	Win	8–0	Jessica Chavez	UD	10	7 Mar 2009	Gimnasio Municipal Nº 1, Puerto Madryn, Argentina	Retained WBA interim light-flyweight title
7	Win	7–0	Ana Fernandez	UD	10	4 Dec 2008	Estadio Luna Park, Buenos Aires, Argentina	Won Interim WBA light-flyweight title
6	Win	6–0	Francia Elena Bravo	TKO	4 (8), 0:38	26 Sep 2008	Ce.De.M. N° 2, Caseros, Argentina	
5	Win	5–0	Adriana Herrera	UD	6	3 Jul 2008	Estadio Luna Park, Buenos Aires, Argentina	
4	Win	4–0	Natalia del Pilar Burga	UD	6	19 Apr 2008	Ce.De.M. N° 1, Caseros, Argentina	
3	Win	3–0	Adriana Herrera	UD	6	8 Mar 2008	Estadio Pedro Estremador, Bariloche, Argentina	
2	Win	2–0	Verena Crespo	TKO	4 (8), 1:44	26 Jan 2008	Estadio Socios Fundadores, Comodoro Rivadavia, Argentina	
1	Win	1–0	Soledad Macedo	TKO	3 (4)	5 Jan 2008	Polideportivo Municipal, Villa Gesell, Argentina	

== See also ==
- List of female boxers

Sporting positions
Regional boxing titles
New title	WBC International light-flyweight champion 26 September 2008 – 6 November 2009; Won interim title	Vacant Title next held by Anastasia Toktaulova
New title	WBO Latino light-flyweight champion 16 December 2023 – 2024; Vacated	Vacant Title next held by Eveling Junieth Ortega
World boxing titles
New title	WBA light-flyweight champion Interim title 4 December 2008 – 2009; Promoted	Vacant Title next held by Joselyn Orroyo Ruiz
Preceded by Ju Hee Kim; Stripped	WBA light-flyweight champion 2009 – November 2020; Promoted to Super champion	Vacant
Inaugural champion	WBO light-flyweight champion 6 November 2009 – 2014; Vacated	Vacant Title next held by Eun Hye Lee
Vacant Title last held by Melissa McMorrow	WBO flyweight champion 26 April 2014 – 2014; Vacated	Vacant Title next held by Kenia Enríquez
New title	WBA light-flyweight champion Super title November 2020 – 11 March 2022	Succeeded by Jessica Nery Plata
