= Brenda "La Bonita" Flores =

Mexican boxer

Brenda Flores
Personal information
- Nickname: La Bonita ("The Pretty")
- Born: Brenda Paulette Flores Monge; 6 October 1992 (age 33) Tijuana, Baja California, Mexico
- Height: 5 ft 2 in (157 cm)
- Weight: Atomweight; Light-flyweight; Flyweight; Super-flyweight; Bantamweight

Boxing career
- Stance: Orthodox

Boxing record
- Total fights: 21
- Wins: 16
- Win by KO: 4
- Losses: 4
- Draws: 1

Brenda Paulette "La Bonita" Flores Monge (born in Baja California Sur, Mexico) is a professional boxer and a world titleholder in the Atomweight class with the World Boxing Council.

== Professional career ==
Flores began her professional career on the 25 October 2013. Her professional debut was against Mónica Murrieta.

In Los Angeles in 2018, she fought the Australian Louisa Hawton and won the world champion title with the Atomweight class in the World Boxing Council. She retained the title the following year.

She had 16 victories, 4 losses and a tie during her career.

== Professional boxing record ==
21 fights	16 wins	4 losses
By knockout	4	0
By decision	12	4
Draws	1	

No.	Result	Record	Opponent	Type	Round, time	Date	Location	Notes
21	Win	16–4–1	Mayelis Altamar	TKO	3 (10), 1:35	1 Mar 2019	Auditorio Municipal, Tijuana, Mexico	Retained WBC interim female atomweight title
20	Win	15–4–1	Lucia Hernandez Nunez	UD	8	9 Nov 2018	Grand Hotel, Tijuana, Mexico	
19	Win	14–4–1	Louisa Hawton	SD	10	8 Sep 2018	The Forum, Inglewood, California, U.S.	Won vacant WBC interim female atomweight title
18	Win	13–4–1	Aurora Bautista	TKO	3 (4), 1:09	1 Jun 2018	Grand Hotel, Tijuana, Mexico	
17	Win	12–4–1	Maria Goreti	MD	8	16 Mar 2018	Grand Hotel, Tijuana, Mexico	
16	Loss	11–4–1	Silvia Torres	UD	10	16 Dec 2017	Domo Sindicato de Trabajadores IMSS, Mexico City, Mexico	
15	Win	11–3–1	Jessica Rangel Gonzalez	UD	6	10 Mar 2017	Grand Hotel, Tijuana, Mexico	
14	Win	10–3–1	Luz Rodriguez	UD	8	2 Dec 2016	Grand Hotel, Tijuana, Mexico	
13	Win	9–3–1	Jessica Martinez Castillo	UD	6	12 Aug 2016	Grand Hotel, Tijuana, Mexico	
12	Win	8–3–1	Luz Rodriguez	UD	4	1 Jul 2016	Grand Hotel, Tijuana, Mexico	
11	Loss	7–3–1	Karely Lopez	MD	10	1 Jan 2015	Gimnasio de Mexicali, Mexicali, Mexico	For vacant Mexican flyweight title
10	Draw	7–2–1	Karely Lopez	SD	8	21 Nov 2014	Centro de Espectáculos Rancho Grande, Mexicali, Mexico	
9	Loss	7–2	Katia Gutiérrez	UD	6	11 Apr 2014	Caliente Hipódromo, Tijuana, Mexico	
8	Win	7–1	Mireya Ochoa	UD	4	31 Jan 2014	Caliente Hipódromo, Tijuana, Mexico	
7	Win	6–1	Guadalupe Bernal	TKO	2 (4), 1:22	23 Oct 2013	Salon Las Pulgas, Tijuana, Mexico	
6	Win	5–1	Diana Gonzalez	UD	4	21 Aug 2013	Salon Las Pulgas, Tijuana, Mexico	
5	Win	4–1	Carol Castro	UD	4	17 Jul 2013	Salon Las Pulgas, Tijuana, Mexico	
4	Win	3–1	Sandra Robles	UD	4	24 May 2013	Caliente Hipódromo, Tijuana, Mexico	
3	Win	2–1	Monica Murrieta	TKO	1 (4), 1:45	10 Apr 2013	Salon Las Pulgas, Tijuana, Mexico	
2	Loss	1–1	Kenia Enríquez	UD	4	19 Dec 2012	Salon Las Pulgas, Tijuana, Mexico	
1	Win	1–0	Paloma Lopez	SD	4	25 Oct 2012	Salon Las Pulgas, Tijuana, Mexico	

== Personal life ==
Flores' husband was shot and killed in front of their home in Colonia Independencia, Tijuana. The couple had two kids together.

== See also ==
- List of female boxers

Sporting positions
World boxing titles
New title	WBC atomweight champion Interim title September 8, 2018 – 2019; Retired	Vacant Title next held by Louisa Hawton
