= Lourdes Juárez =

Mexican boxer (born 1986)

Personal information
- Nickname: La Pequena Lulu ("The Little Lulu")
- Born: Lourdes Yoana Juárez Trejo; 19 December 1986 (age 39) Mexico City, Mexico
- Height: 5 ft 1 1/2 in (156 cm)
- Weight: Light-flyweight; Flyweight; Super-flyweight

Boxing career
- Reach: 62 1/2 in (159 cm)
- Stance: Orthodox

Boxing record
- Total fights: 45
- Wins: 40
- Win by KO: 5
- Losses: 4
- No contests: 1

Lourdes Yoana Juárez Trejo (born 19 December 1986) is a Mexican professional boxer. She is a two-weight world champion having held the WBC female light-flyweight title since November 2024 and previously the WBC female super-flyweight title from December 2020 until October 2022.

== Personal life ==
She is the younger sister of former world champion boxer Mariana Juárez.

== Professional career ==
Juárez made her professional debut on 26 October 2013, scoring a fourth-round knockout (KO) victory against Gabriela Martinez at the Deportiva Agustín Ramos Millan in Toluca, Mexico. After two more victories—both by unanimous decision (UD)—Juárez suffered two consecutive defeats in 2014; losing via second-round technical knockout (TKO) against Jazmin Ortega in February and a four-round split decision (SD) against Brisa Hernández in April.

Following the defeats she embarked on a 14-fight winning streak before facing future world champion Yesenia Gómez on 24 September 2016 at the Oasis Hotel Complex in Cancún, Mexico. The bout was stopped in the fourth round of a scheduled eight-rounder after Gómez suffered a cut from an accidental clash of heads, resulting in the fight being ruled a no contest (NC).

She scored three more victories, one by TKO, before challenging for her first title—the WBC FECOMBOX female flyweight title—against Cecilia Santoscoy on 2 September 2017 at the Centro de Espectáculos de la Feria de León in León, Mexico. Juárez defeated Santoscoy via ten-round UD to capture the regional WBC title. She made one successful defence, defeating Diana Fernández via ten-round SD in November.

After eight more victories, one by TKO, she challenged for the WBC female super flyweight title against reigning champion Guadalupe Martínez Guzmán on 12 December 2020 at the Studios Televisa in Mexico City. In a fight which saw both boxers trade punches at close range throughout the fight, with Lourdes' being the more accurate of the two, she defeated Guzmán via UD to capture her first world title. Two judges scored the bout 97–93 and the third scored it 96–93.

Juarez lost her title to fellow Mexican boxer Asley González by majority decision on 1 October 2022. A rematch was held on 25 March 2023 with Juarez falling to a split decision defeat.

She won the vacant WBC light-flyweight title with a unanimous decision win over Yesenia Gómez in Chetumal, Mexico, on 29 November 2024.

Juárez successfully defended the title by stopping Mirna Sanchez in the ninth round at Explanada Municipal Tequisquiapan Querétaro in Tequisquiapan, Mexico, on 9 March 2025.

She then defeated Yesica Nery Plata by majority decision to retain the title for a second time at Most Valuable Prospects 16, on 18 October 2025 at South Padre Island Convention Center in South Padre Island, Texas, USA.

In her next title defense, Juárez faced Yokasta Valle at County Coliseum in El Paso, Texas, U.S., on 30 May 2026. She knocked her opponent to the canvas in the last round and went on to win via split decision with two of the ringside judges scoring the bout 98–91 and 95–94 in her favour, while the third had it 95–94 for her opponent.

== Professional boxing record ==
44 fights	39 wins	4 losses
By knockout	5	1
By decision	34	3
No contests	1	

No.	Result	Record	Opponent	Type	Round, time	Date	Location	Notes
45	Win	40–4 (1)	Yokasta Valle	SD	10	30 May 2026	County Coliseum, El Paso, Texas, U.S	Retained WBC light-flyweight title
44	Win	39–4 (1)	Yesica Nery Plata	MD	10	18 Oct 2025	South Padre Island Convention Centre, South Padre Island, Texas, U.S.	Retained WBC light-flyweight title
43	Win	38–4 (1)	Mirna Sanchez	TKO	9 (10)	7 Mar 2025	Explanada Municipal Tequisquiapan Queretaro, Tequisquiapan, Mexico	Retained WBC female light-flyweight title
42	Win	37–4 (1)	Yesenia Gómez	UD	10	29 Nov 2024	Chetumal, Mexico	Won vacant WBC female light-flyweight title
41	Win	36–4 (1)	Cristina Jimenez Ramirez	UD	6	24 May 2024	Centro Civico de Ecatepec, Ecatepec de Morelos, Mexico	
40	Win	35–4 (1)	Mayela Perez	UD	10	20 Oct 2023	Domo de la Feria, Fresnillo, Mexico	
39	Loss	34–4 (1)	Asley González	SD	10	25 Mar 2023	Tepic, Nayarit, Mexico	For WBC female super-flyweight title
38	Loss	34–3 (1)	Asley González	MD	10	1 Oct 2022	Tepic, Nayarit, Mexico	Lost WBC female super-flyweight title
37	Win	34–2 (1)	Debora Vanesa Gomez	UD	10	4 Jun 2022	Domo de la Feria, Fresnillo, Mexico	Retained WBC female super-flyweight title
36	Win	33–2 (1)	Luz Elena Aguilar	UD	10	12 Nov 2021	Centro Internacional de Convenciones, Puerto Vallarta, Mexico	Retained WBC female super-flyweight title
35	Win	32–2 (1)	Diana Fernandez	SD	10	16 Jul 2021	Gimnasio Municipal "Jose Neri Santos", Ciudad Juárez, Mexico	Retained WBC female super-flyweight title
34	Win	31–2 (1)	Guadalupe Martínez Guzmán	UD	10	12 Dec 2020	Studios Televisa, Mexico City, Mexico	Won WBC female super-flyweight title
33	Win	30–2 (1)	Kandy Sandoval	MD	6	11 Sep 2020	Deportiva Tlalli, Tlalnepantla, Mexico	
32	Win	29–2 (1)	Celeste Belén González	UD	8	9 Nov 2019	Lienzo Charro Hermanos Ramírez, Corregidora, Mexico	
31	Win	28–2 (1)	Alondra Prado	UD	10	27 Jul 2019	Rodeo Santa Fe, Tlalnepantla, Mexico	
30	Win	27–2 (1)	Leiryn Flores	TKO	6 (10), 1:08	9 Mar 2019	Arena Coliseo, Mexico City, Mexico	
29	Win	26–2 (1)	Kandy Sandoval	UD	8	8 Dec 2018	Domo Binacional, Nogales, Mexico	
28	Win	25–2 (1)	Gabriela Sanchez	UD	8	13 Oct 2018	Sala de Armas Agustín Melgar, Mexico City, Mexico	
27	Win	24–2 (1)	Jacky Calvo	SD	8	26 May 2018	Teatro Moliere, Mexico City, Mexico	
26	Win	23–2 (1)	Linda Contreras	UD	8	24 Mar 2018	Lienzo Charro, Saltillo, Mexico	
25	Win	22–2 (1)	Diana Fernández	SD	10	4 Nov 2017	Gimnasio Municipal "Jose Neri Santos", Ciudad Juárez, Mexico	Retained WBC FECOMBOX flyweight title
24	Win	20–2 (1)	Cecilia Santoscoy	UD	10	2 Sep 2017	Holiday Inn at Birmingham Airport, Birmingham, England	Won vacant WBC FECOMBOX flyweight title
23	Win	20–2 (1)	Anahí Torres	UD	8	1 Jul 2017	Auditorio Centenario, Gómez Palacio, Mexico	
22	Win	19–2 (1)	Karina Fernández	UD	10	25 Mar 2017	Gimnasio Municipal "Jose Neri Santos", Ciudad Juárez, Mexico	
21	Win	18–2 (1)	Noemi Bosques	TKO	4 (10), 1:22	3 Dec 2016	Centro de Convenciones, Acapulco, Mexico	
20	NC	17–2 (1)	Yesenia Gómez	NC	4 (8)	24 Sep 2016	Oasis Hotel Complex, Cancún, Mexico	Fight stopped after Gómez was cut from an accidental head clash
19	Win	17–2	Guadalupe Bautista	UD	8	13 Aug 2016	Auditorio Benito Juárez, Veracruz, Mexico	
18	Win	16–2	Suri Tapia	SD	8	28 May 2016	Centro de Convenciones, Acapulco, Mexico	
17	Win	15–2	Marlen Sandoval	UD	4	26 Mar 2016	Arena Coliseo, Mexico City, Mexico	
16	Win	14–2	Vianey Ortega	UD	4	23 Jan 2016	Domo Care, Guadalupe, Mexico	
15	Win	13–2	Jazmin González	SD	6	12 Dec 2015	Auditorio BB, Mexico City, Mexico	
14	Win	12–2	Rebeca Castro	UD	4	17 Oct 2015	Auditorio Benito Juárez, Veracruz, Mexico	
13	Win	11–2	Yanely Ceja Hernández	UD	4	22 Aug 2015	Gimnasio Municipal "Jose Neri Santos", Ciudad Juárez, Mexico	
12	Win	10–2	Celeste Belén González	UD	6	30 May 2015	Arena Coliseo, Mexico City, Mexico	
11	Win	9–2	Adriana Joselyn Valdes	UD	4	25 Apr 2015	Arena Coliseo, Mexico City, Mexico	
10	Win	8–2	Edith Flores	TKO	6 (6), 1:46	21 Mar 2015	Centro de Convenciones, Tlalnepantla, Mexico	
9	Win	7–2	Adriana Joselyn Valdes	UD	4	24 Jan 2015	Centro de Convenciones Azul, Zihuatanejo, Mexico	
8	Win	6–2	Jacky Calvo	SD	6	1 Nov 2014	Arena Coliseo, Mexico City, Mexico	
7	Win	5–2	Elizabeth Muñoz Guadarrama	UD	6	23 Aug 2014	Convention Center Surman Villa de las Flores, Coacalco, Mexico	
6	Win	4–2	Edith Flores	UD	6	14 Jun 2014	Explanada Municipal, Tlalnepantla, Mexico	
5	Loss	3–2	Brisa Hernández	SD	4	26 Apr 2014	Foro Polanco, Mexico City, Mexico	
4	Loss	3–1	Jazmin Ortega	TKO	2 (4)	8 Feb 2014	Caballerizes de Huixquilucan, Huixquilucan Mexico	
3	Win	3–0	Yanely Ceja Hernández	UD	4	11 Jan 2014	Auditorio Benito Juárez, Veracruz, Mexico	
2	Win	2–0	Carolina Garcia	UD	4	23 Nov 2013	Arena Solidaridad, Monterrey, Mexico	
1	Win	1–0	Gabriela Martinez	KO	4 (4)	26 Oct 2013	Deportivo Agustín Ramos Millan, Toluca, Mexico	

== See also ==
- List of female boxers
- Notable boxing families

Sporting positions
Regional boxing titles
Vacant Title last held by Tania Enriquez	WBC FECOMBOX flyweight champion 2 September 2017 – 2018; Vacated	Vacant Title next held by Alondra Prado Nava
World boxing titles
Preceded by Guadalupe Martínez Guzmán	WBC super-flyweight champion 12 December 2020 – 1 October 2022	Succeeded by Asley González
Vacant Title last held by Yesica Nery Plata	WBC light-flyweight champion 29 November 2024 – present	Incumbent
