= Yessica Chávez =

Mexican boxer (born 1988)

Personal information
- Nickname: Kika
- Born: Yessica Chávez Valencia; 15 July 1988 (age 38) Mexico City, Mexico
- Height: 5 ft 2 in (157 cm)
- Weight: Light flyweight; Flyweight; Super flyweight

Boxing career
- Reach: 62 1/2 in (159 cm)
- Stance: Orthodox

Boxing record
- Total fights: 40
- Wins: 32
- Win by KO: 4
- Losses: 5
- Draws: 3

Yessica Chávez Valencia (Spanish pronunciation: [ˈɟ͡ʝesika ˈt͡ʃaβes]; born 15 July 1988) is a Mexican professional boxer. She is a former world champion in two weight classes, having held the IBF female light flyweight title from 2011 to 2013 and the WBC female flyweight title from 2015 to 2017. She also challenged for the WBC female light flyweight title in 2014 and the WBC female super flyweight title in 2019.

== Professional career ==
Chávez made her professional debut on 12 June 2006, scoring a fourth-round technical knockout (TKO) victory against Maribel Cruz in Cancún, Mexico.

After compiling a record of 5–0–2 (1 KO), she suffered her first defeat, losing by points decision (PTS) over six rounds against Ibeth Zamora Silva on 7 June 2008 in Toluca, Mexico. She came back from defeat with a four-round PTS win against Magdalena Leija in November, before challenging Yésica Bopp for the WBA interim female light flyweight title on 7 March 2009 at the Gimnasio Municipal No. 1 in Puerto Madryn, Argentina. Chávez suffered her second defeat, losing by a shutout unanimous decision (UD) over ten rounds, with all three judges scoring the bout 100–90.

Following the defeat to Bopp she secured three wins, one by knockout (KO), before defeating Susana Cruz Pérez via split decision (SD) to capture the vacant WBC-NABF female light flyweight title on 2 October 2010 at the Coliseo Olimpico de la UG in Guadalajara, Mexico. She next fought Esmeralda Moreno for the Mexican interim, and WBC Silver female light flyweight titles on 19 February 2011 at the Deportivo Trabajadores del Metro in Iztacalco, Mexico. Chávez lost the bout by UD, with all three judges scoring it 98–92.

In her next fight she challenged IBF female light flyweight champion, Irma Sánchez, on 16 April 2011 at the World Trade Center in Boco del Río, Mexico. Chávez defeated Sánchez via SD to capture her first world title, with two judges scoring the bout 99–91 and 97–93 in favour of Chávez while the third scored it 96–95 to Sánchez. She successfully defended the title three times, winning two by stoppage, followed by a UD victory against Linda Soto in a non-title fight in July 2011 before losing the title outside of the ring in September (stripped or vacated).

In her next fight she defeated former world title challenger, Kanittha Kokietgym, via shutout UD to capture the lightly regarded vacant WBF interim female light flyweight title on 10 November 2012 at the Estadio Morelos in Ecatepec, Mexico. All three judges scored the bout 100–90 in favour of Chávez.

She next faced Irma Sánchez in a rematch on 23 February 2013 at the Centro de Convenciones in Ixtapa, Mexico, with the vacant WBC Silver female light flyweight title on the line. Chávez defeated Sánchez for a second time, this time by UD with two judges scoring the bout 98–92 and the third scored it 99–91. Her first defence of the title came against former foe and reigning WBA and WBO female light flyweight champion, Yésica Bopp, on 1 June at the Centro Civico in Ecatepec. Bopp's WBA and WBO titles were not at stake, only Chávez' WBC Silver title. Chávez gained revenge over Bopp, making the score 1–1 with a UD victory. Two judges scored the bout 97–93 and the third scored it 96–95. Chávez scored a ten-round UD win in a non-title fight against former world champion Tenkai Tsunami in July, before making the second defence of her WBC Silver title against former world champion Arely Muciño in November, retaining the title through a split draw.

She moved up to flyweight following the draw to Muciño, scoring a UD victory in a rematch with Tsunami in April 2014 before defeating former world champion, Melissa McMorrow, by UD to capture the WBC International flyweight title on 23 August at the Convention Center Surman Villa de las Flores in Coacalco, Mexico, with the judges' scorecards reading 97–93, 97–94 and 96–94.

She moved back down to light flyweight to challenged the WBC champion, Ibeth Zamora Silva, on 22 November at the Plaza de los Martíres in Toluca. Chávez failed in her attempt at a second light flyweight world title, losing by UD, with all three judges scoring the bout 98–92.

Following defeat to Silva she moved back up to flyweight, defeating Norj Guro by UD in April 2015 and Maria Magdalena Rivera by UD in June to capture the vacant WBC International title for a second time, before challenging newly crowned WBC female flyweight champion, Arely Muciño, in a rematch on 19 September at the Emiliano Zapata Sports Center in Ecatepec. Chávez captured her second world title, becoming a two-weight world champion via UD. The judges' scorecards read 99–91 and 98–92 twice. She went on to successfully defend the title six times, scoring wins over former world champions Simona Galassi, Naoko Fujioka and Esmeralda Moreno twice.

She moved up to super flyweight for her next fight, challenging WBC champion Guadalupe Martínez Guzmán on 27 April 2019 at the Centro Regional de Deporte de Las Américas in Ecatepec. Chávez failed in her attempt at becoming a three-weight world champion, losing by SD. One judge scored the bout 96–94 in favour of Chávez while the other two scored it 97–93 and 96–94 in favour of Guzmán.

In December 2024, it was announced she had been elected to the International Boxing Hall of Fame.

== Professional boxing record ==
40 fights	32 wins	5 losses
By knockout	4	0
By decision	28	5
Draws	3	

No.	Result	Record	Opponent	Type	Round, time	Date	Location	Notes
40	Win	32–5–3	(Mexico) Susy Kandy Sandoval	UD	8	17 July 2021	Gimnasio TV Azteca, Mexico City, Mexico	
39	Win	31–5–3	(Mexico) Jaqueline Mucio Munoz	UD	10	29 May 2021	Grand Hotel, Tijuana Centros, Mexico	
38	Loss	30–5–3	(Mexico) Guadalupe Martínez Guzmán	SD	10	27 Apr 2019	Coliseo Olimpico de la UG, Guadalajara, Mexico	For WBC female super flyweight title
37	Win	30–4–3	(Mexico) Esmeralda Moreno	UD	10	30 Sep 2017	Universidad Autónoma de Guadalajara, Zapopan, Mexico	Retained WBC female flyweight title
36	Win	29–4–3	(Colombia) Ana Arrazola	UD	10	13 May 2017	Gimnasio Nuevo León, Monterrey, Mexico	Retained WBC female flyweight title
35	Win	28–4–3	(Japan) Naoko Fujioka	UD	10	1 Oct 2016	World Trade Center, Boca del Río, Mexico	Retained WBC female flyweight title
34	Win	27–4–3	(Mexico) Esmeralda Moreno	MD	10	23 Jul 2016	Deportivo Trabajadores del Metro, Mexico City, Mexico	Retained WBC female flyweight title
33	Win	26–4–3	(Mexico) Vanesa Lorena Taborda	UD	10	5 Mar 2016	Coliseo Olimpico de la UG, Guadalajara, Mexico	Retained WBC female flyweight title
32	Win	25–4–3	(Italy) Simona Galassi	TD	9 (10), 0:42	12 Dec 2015	Estadio Centenario, Los Mochis, Mexico	Retained WBC female flyweight title; Fight stopped after Galassi cut from accident head clash
31	Win	24–4–3	(Mexico) Arely Muciño	UD	10	19 Sep 2015	Palenque de la Feria, Durango City, Mexico	Won WBC female flyweight title
30	Win	23–4–3	(Mexico) Maria Magdalena Rivera	UD	10	27 Jun 2015	Gimnasio de la AUT, Tampico, Mexico	Won vacant WBC International female flyweight title
29	Win	22–4–3	(Argentina) Norj Guro	UD	10	11 Apr 2015	Gimnasio Municipal Number 1, Puerto Madryn, Argentina	
28	Loss	21–4–3	(Mexico) Ibeth Zamora Silva	UD	10	22 Nov 2014	Gimnasio Beto Estrada, Piedras Negras, Mexico	For WBC female light flyweight title
27	Win	21–3–3	(United States) Melissa McMorrow	UD	10	23 Aug 2014	Toluca, Mexico	Won vacant WBC International female flyweight title
26	Win	20–3–3	(Japan) Tenkai Tsunami	UD	10	26 Apr 2014	Centros de Espectaculos Titanes, Piedras Negras, Mexico	
25	Draw	19–3–3	(Mexico) Arely Muciño	SD	10	9 Nov 2013	Puerto Vallarta, Mexico	Retained WBC Silver female light flyweight title
24	Win	19–3–2	(Japan) Tenkai Tsunami	UD	10	27 Jul 2013	Cancún, Mexico	
23	Win	18–3–2	(Argentina) Yésica Bopp	UD	10	1 Jun 2013	Monterrey, Mexico	Retained WBC Silver female light flyweight title
22	Win	17–3–2	(Mexico) Irma Sánchez	UD	10	23 Feb 2013	Salon Marbet Plus, Ciudad Nezahualcóyotl, Mexico	Won vacant WBC Silver female light flyweight title
21	Win	16–3–2	(Mexico) Kanittha Kokietgym	UD	10	10 Nov 2012	Arena Azteca Budokan, Ciudad Nezahualcóyotl, Mexico	Won WBF interim light flyweight title
20	Win	15–3–2	(Mexico) Linda Soto	UD	8	19 Jul 2012	Cancún, Mexico	
19	Win	14–3–2	(Thailand) Teeraporn Pannimit	TKO	5 (10), 0:55	14 Jan 2012	Coliseo Olimpico de la UG, Guadalajara, Mexico	Retained IBF female light flyweight title
18	Win	13–3–2	(Mexico) Yesenia Martinez Castrejon	UD	10	10 Sep 2011	Universidad Autónoma de Guadalajara, Zapopan, Mexico	Retained IBF female light flyweight title
17	Win	12–3–2	(Colombia) Mayelis Altamar	TKO	5 (10), 0:43	2 Jul 2011	Gimnasio Nuevo León, Monterrey, Mexico	Retained IBF female light flyweight title
16	Win	11–3–2	(Mexico) Irma Sánchez	SD	10	16 Apr 2011	World Trade Center, Boca del Río, Mexico	Won IBF female light flyweight title
15	Loss	10–3–2	(Mexico) Esmeralda Moreno	UD	10	19 Feb 2011	Deportivo Trabajadores del Metro, Mexico City, Mexico	For Mexican interim female and vacant WBC Silver female light flyweight titles
14	Win	10–2–2	(Mexico) Susana Cruz Perez	SD	10	2 Oct 2010	Coliseo Olimpico de la UG, Guadalajara, Mexico	Won vacant WBC-NABF light flyweight title
13	Win	9–2–2	(Mexico) Katia Gutiérrez	MD	8	26 Jun 2010	Estadio Centenario, Los Mochis, Mexico	
12	Win	8–2–2	(Mexico) Nora Cardoza	KO	2 (6)	10 Apr 2010	Palenque de la Feria, Durango City, Mexico	
11	Win	7–2–2	(Mexico) Mariana Jimenez Catorce	UD	8	3 Jul 2009	Gimnasio de la AUT, Tampico, Mexico	
10	Loss	6–2–2	(Argentina) Yésica Bopp	UD	10	7 Mar 2009	Gimnasio Municipal Number 1, Puerto Madryn, Argentina	For WBA interim female light flyweight title
9	Win	6–1–2	(Mexico) Magdalena Leija	PTS	4	1 Nov 2008	Gimnasio Beto Estrada, Piedras Negras, Mexico	
8	Loss	5–1–2	(Mexico) Ibeth Zamora Silva	PTS	6	7 Jun 2008	Toluca, Mexico	
7	Win	5–0–2	(Mexico) Mayela Perez	PTS	6	31 May 2008	Centros de Espectaculos Titanes, Piedras Negras, Mexico	
6	Win	4–0–2	(Mexico) Maria Elena Villalobos	PTS	4	28 Apr 2008	Puerto Vallarta, Mexico	
5	Win	3–0–2	(Mexico) Maribel Cruz	PTS	4	2 Oct 2007	Cancún, Mexico	
4	Win	2–0–2	(Mexico) Lucia Avalos	PTS	4	10 Jul 2007	Monterrey, Mexico	
3	Draw	1–0–2	(Mexico) Belen Posadas	PTS	4	14 Apr 2007	Salon Marbet Plus, Ciudad Nezahualcóyotl, Mexico	
2	Draw	1–0–1	(Mexico) Ana Arrazola	PTS	4	10 Feb 2007	Arena Azteca Budokan, Ciudad Nezahualcóyotl, Mexico	
1	Win	1–0	(Mexico) Maribel Cruz	TKO	4 (4)	12 Jun 2006	Cancún, Mexico	
