= Yesenia Gómez =

Mexican boxer (born 1996)

Personal information
- Nickname: La Nina
- Born: Yesenia Guadalupe Gómez Vasquez; 21 January 1996 (age 30) Cancún, Quintana Roo, Mexico
- Weight: Mini flyweight; Light flyweight; Flyweight

Boxing career
- Stance: Orthodox

Boxing record
- Total fights: 34
- Wins: 21
- Win by KO: 7
- Losses: 8
- Draws: 4
- No contests: 1

Yesenia Guadalupe Gómez Vasquez (Spanish pronunciation: [ɟ͡ʝeˈsenja ˈgomes]; born 21 January 1996) is a Mexican professional boxer who formerly held the WBC female light-flyweight title.

== Professional career ==
Gómez made her professional debut on 25 June 2011, losing by unanimous decision (UD) over four rounds against Dorely Valente at the Parque Andrés Quintana Roo in Cozumel, Mexico. Gómez bounced back from defeat with a four-round UD win against Rebeca Castro in February 2012, before losing her next fight to her debut opponent's twin sister, Arely Valente, in April.

She won her next three fights, two by stoppage, before facing Arely Valente in a rematch on 16 March 2013 at the Grand Oasis Arena in Cancún, Mexico. Gómez gained revenge by defeating Valente via UD over ten rounds to capture the WBC Youth female flyweight title, with the judges' scorecards reading 98–92, 98–93 and 97–93. After retaining her title with a first-round technical knockout (TKO) against Blanca Diaz the following May, she lost the title via majority decision (MD) in a third fight with Arely Valente on 17 August 2013 at the Plaza de Toros in Cancún. Two judges scored the bout 98–92 in favour of Valente, while the third scored it even at 96–96.

Two months later she faced Susana Cruz Perez for the WBC Youth female minimumweight title on 12 October in Calpulalpan, Mexico. Gómez suffered the fourth defeat of her career, losing via UD over ten rounds. Two judges scored the bout 98–92 and the third scored it 97–93.

After scoring three wins, one by stoppage, she captured her second professional title by defeating Guadalupe Ramirez for the WBC Youth female light flyweight title on 28 February 2015 at the Oasis Hotel Complex in Cancún. All three judges scored the bout 98–94.

After three more wins, two by stoppage, she faced future world champion Lourdes Juárez in September 2016. The bout was called off in the fourth round on the advice of the ringside doctor after Gómez suffered a cut from an accidental clash of heads, resulting in a no contest (NC). Her next two fights were against Jacky Calvo in April and June 2017, with both resulting in a draw, followed by an MD loss to Guadalupe Bautista in September of the same year.

Her next fight came against reigning WBC female light flyweight champion Esmeralda Moreno 19 May 2018 at the Poliforum in Playa del Carmen, Mexico. Moreno retained her title through a majority draw, with two judges scoring the bout even at 95–95 while the third scored it 97–93 in favour of Gómez. She would get an immediate rematch with Moreno on 22 September 2018 at the Grand Oasis Arena. Gómez settled the score on their previous bout, defeating Moreno via MD to capture the WBC female light flyweight title. Two judges scored the bout in favour of Gómez with 97–93 and 96–94, while the third judge scored it even at 95–95.

Gómez lost her title to Canada's Kim Clavel going down by unanimous decision on 27 July 2022 at Montreal Casino, Montreal, Canada.

She faced Lourdes Juárez for the now vacant WBC female light-flyweight title in Chetumal, Mexico, on 29 November 2024, losing via unanimous decision.

== Professional boxing record ==
34 fights	21 wins	8 losses
By knockout	7	0
By decision	14	8
Draws	4	
No contests	1	

No.	Result	Record	Opponent	Type	Round, time	Date	Location	Notes
33	Loss	21–7–4 (1)	(Mexico) Lourdes Juárez	UD	10	29 Nov 2024	Chetumal, Mexico	For WBC female light flyweight title
32	Loss	21–6–4 (1)	(Mexico) Cecilia Nino Rodriguez	UD	10	17 May 2024	Centro Internacional de Convenciones, Chetumal, Mexico	
31	Win	21–6–4 (1)	(Mexico) Mariela Ribera Valverde	UD	8	19 Jan 2024	Chetumal, Mexico	
31	Win	20–6–4 (1)	(Mexico) Lorena Yenesina Cruz Aispuro	TKO	1 (8)	13 Oct 2024	Poliforum Benito Juarez, Cancun, Mexico	
30	Draw	19–6–4 (1)	(Mexico) Arlenn Sanchez Aguirre	SD	8	18 Aug 2023	Cancún, Mexico	
29	Loss	19–6–3 (1)	(Canada) Kim Clavel	UD	10	29 Jul 2022	Montreal Casino, Montreal, Canada	Lost WBC female light flyweight title
28	Win	19–5–3 (1)	(Mexico) Itzayana Cruz Delgado	MD	8	16 Oct 2021	Oasis Hotel Complex, Cancún, Mexico	
27	Win	18–5–3 (1)	(Mexico) Mirna Sanchez	UD	8	31 Oct 2020	Grand Oasis Arena, Cancún, Mexico	
26	Win	17–5–3 (1)	(Venezuela) Debora Rengifo	UD	10	26 Oct 2019	Plaza de Toros, Cancún, Mexico	Retained WBC female light flyweight title
25	Win	16–5–3 (1)	(Mexico) Ana Victoria Polo	UD	10	29 Jun 2019	Grand Oasis Arena, Cancún, Mexico	Retained WBC female light flyweight title
24	Win	15–5–3 (1)	(Japan) Erika Hanawa	MD	10	16 Feb 2019	Oasis Hotel Complex, Cancún, Mexico	Retained WBC female light flyweight title
23	Win	14–5–3 (1)	(Mexico) Esmeralda Moreno	MD	10	22 Sep 2018	Grand Oasis Arena, Cancún, Mexico	Won WBC female light flyweight title
22	Draw	13–5–3 (1)	(Mexico) Esmeralda Moreno	MD	10	19 May 2018	Poliforum, Playa del Carmen, Mexico	For WBC female light flyweight title
21	Loss	13–5–2 (1)	(Mexico) Guadalupe Bautista	MD	8	30 Sep 2017	Grand Oasis Arena, Cancún, Mexico	
20	Draw	13–4–2 (1)	(Mexico) Jacky Calvo	MD	8	3 Jun 2017	Grand Oasis Arena, Cancún, Mexico	
19	Draw	13–4–1 (1)	(Mexico) Jacky Calvo	SD	6	8 Apr 2017	Oasis Hotel Complex, Cancún, Mexico	
18	NC	13–4 (1)	(Mexico) Lourdes Juárez	NC	4 (8)	24 Sep 2016	Oasis Hotel Complex, Cancún, Mexico	Fight stopped after Gómez cut from accidental head clash
17	Win	13–4	(Mexico) Clarisabel Nataren	TKO	2 (4), 1:22	4 Jun 2016	Oasis Hotel Complex, Cancún, Mexico	
16	Win	12–4	(Mexico) Adriana Valdes Reza	UD	8	18 Mar 2016	Oasis Hotel Complex, Cancún, Mexico	TD after Gutierrez cut from accidental head clash
15	Win	11–4	(Mexico) Elizabeth Lopez Corzo	TKO	1 (8), 1:21	27 Nov 2015	Sindicato de Taxistas, Cancún, Mexico	
14	Win	10–4	(Mexico) Guadalupe Ramirez	UD	10	28 Feb 2015	Oasis Hotel Complex, Cancún, Mexico	Won WBC Youth female flyweight title
13	Win	9–4	(Mexico) Yanely Ceja Hernandez	UD	10	27 Sep 2014	Hotel Gran Riviera Princess, Playa del Carmen, Mexico	
12	Win	8–4	(Mexico) Tania Cosme	UD	8	28 Mar 2014	Sindicato de Taxistas, Cancún, Mexico	
11	Win	7–4	(Mexico) Susana Gonzalez	TKO	3 (10)	6 Dec 2013	Sindicato de Taxistas, Cancún, Mexico	
10	Loss	6–4	(Mexico) Susana Cruz Perez	UD	10	12 Oct 2013	Calpulalpan, Mexico	For WBC Youth female strawweight title
9	Loss	6–3	(Mexico) Arely Valente	MD	10	17 Aug 2013	Plaza de Toros, Cancún, Mexico	Lost WBC Youth female flyweight title
8	Win	6–2	(Mexico) Blanca Diaz	TKO	1 (10), 1:48	18 May 2013	Grand Oasis Arena, Cancún, Mexico	Retained WBC Youth female flyweight title
7	Win	5–2	(Mexico) Arely Valente	UD	10	16 Mar 2013	Grand Oasis Arena, Cancún, Mexico	Won WBC Youth female flyweight title
6	Win	4–2	(Mexico) Patricia De Los Santos Garcia	KO	1 (4), 1:40	19 Jan 2013	Centro de Convenciones, Villahermosa, Mexico	
5	Win	3–2	(Mexico) Patricia De Los Santos Garcia	TKO	1 (4)	21 Sep 2012	Sindicato de Taxistas, Cancún, Mexico	
4	Win	2–2	(Mexico) Linda Vazquez	UD	4	29 Jun 2012	Sindicato de Taxistas, Cancún, Mexico	
3	Loss	1–2	(Mexico) Arely Valente	UD	4	7 Apr 2012	Oasis Hotel Complex, Cancún, Mexico	
2	Win	1–1	(Mexico) Rebeca Castro	UD	4	10 Feb 2012	Sindicato de Taxistas, Cancún, Mexico	
1	Loss	0–1	(Mexico) Dorely Valente	UD	4	25 Jun 2011	Parque Andrés Quintana Roo, Cozumel, Mexico	
