= Kenia Enríquez =

Mexican boxer and mixed martial artist (born 1993)

Personal information
- Born: Kenia Stephanie Enríquez Rosas; 21 October 1993 (age 32) Tijuana, Baja California, Mexico
- Height: 5 ft 3 in (160 cm)
- Weight: Light flyweight; Flyweight

Boxing career
- Stance: Orthodox

Boxing record
- Total fights: 29
- Wins: 28
- Win by KO: 11
- Losses: 1

Kenia Stephanie Enríquez Rosas (born 21 October 1993) is a Mexican professional boxer and mixed martial artist. She who is the interim WBC female flyweight World champion and previously held the WBO female flyweight World title and the interim WBC female light-flyweight World title.

In 2025, Enríquez debuted as a mixed martial arts fighter for the Combate Global promotion.

== Professional boxer career ==
Enríquez made her professional debut on 6 July 2012, scoring a first-round technical knockout (TKO) victory against Guadalupe Valdez at the Salon Las Pulgas in Tijuana, Mexico.

After compiling a record of 10–0 (5 KOs), she faced Jolene Blackshear for the vacant WBC-NABF female light flyweight title on 4 April 2014 at the Four Points Sheraton Hotel in San Diego, California. After landing three left hooks to Blackshear's head, Enríquez unleashed a flurry of punches on her staggering opponent, prompting referee Jose Cobian to step in and call off the fight, awarding Enríquez her first professional title via seventh-round TKO.

Following a unanimous decision (UD) win against Mayela Perez in September, Enríquez faced former world title challenger Ana Arrazola for the vacant WBO female flyweight title on 21 November 2014 at the Crowne Plaza Hotel in San Diego, California. Enríquez defeated Arrazola by a shutout UD to become Mexico's first ever WBO female champion, with two judges scoring the bout 100–90 and the third scoring it 100–89. In her first title defence, she faced former world champion Melissa McMorrow on 28 February 2015 at the Centro de Convenciones in Rosarito Beach, Mexico. Enríquez suffered the first defeat of her career, losing her title via split decision (SD). Two judges scored the bout in favour of McMorrow at 98–92 and 97–93 while the third scored it for Enríquez at 96–94.

Following defeat to McMorrow, she scored five wins, two by stoppage, before facing Maria Salinas for the vacant WBC interim light flyweight title on 27 May 2017 at the Auditorio De La Expo in Ciudad Obregón, Mexico. Enríquez captured a world title, albeit an interim one, in her second weight class via third-round TKO.

Enriquez defeated Ibeth Zamora Silva by unanimous decision at La Paz, Baja California Sur, Mexico, on 10 September 2023 to claim the interim WBC female flyweight World title.

== Mixed martial arts career ==
=== Combate Global ===
On March 13, 2026, Enríquez made her MMA debut with a unanimous decision victory over Hayley Valentine at the Combate Global: Female 1 event.

In her next fight, Enríquez faced Hannah Brobyskov in the main event of Combate Global: Enriquez vs. Brobyskov held on July 17, 2025, where she took the victory with a technical knockout in the second round.

Enriquez headlined another fight on Combate Global, this time facing CaySea McBride on March 12, 2026. She won the fight with a technical knockout in the first round.

== Professional boxing record ==
29 fights	28 wins	1 loss
By knockout	11	0
By decision	17	1

No.	Result	Record	Opponent	Type	Round, time	Date	Location	Notes
29	Win	28–1	(Mexico) Maria Salinas	UD	10	3 Feb 2024	San Nicolas de los Garza, Nuevo León, Mexico	Retained WBC interim female flyweight World title
28	Win	27–1	(Mexico) Ibeth Zamora Silva	UD	10	10 Sep 2023	La Paz, Baja California Sur, Mexico	Won the vacant WBC interim female flyweight World title
27	Win	26–1	(Mexico) Araceli Palacios Figueroa	UD	8	3 Jun 2023	Polideportivo Centenario, Los Mochis, Mexico	
26	Win	25–1	(Mexico) Nora Cardoza	TKO	2 (10)	28 Oct 2022	Grand Hotel, Tijuana, Mexico	
25	Win	24–1	(Mexico) Gabriela Sanchez Saavedra	RTD	9 (10)	28 May 2022	Krystal Grand Nuevo Vallarta Hotel, Nuevo Vallarta, Mexico	
24	Win	23–1	(Japan) Chaoz Minowa	UD	10	18 Jan 2020	Centro de Convenciones, Tamazula de Gordiano, Mexico	Retained WBC interim female light flyweight title
23	Win	22–1	(Venezuela) Leiryn Flores	PTS	4	25 May 2019	Estadio de Beisbol Agustin Flores Contreras, Puerto Vallarta, Mexico	Retained WBC interim female light flyweight title
22	Win	21–1	(Venezuela) Norleidys Graterol	UD	10	6 Oct 2018	Gasmart Stadium, Tijuana, Mexico	Retained WBC interim female light flyweight title
21	Win	20–1	(Mexico) Jessica Nery Plata	UD	10	18 Nov 2017	Centro de Usos Multiples, Ciudad Obregón, Mexico	Retained WBC interim female light flyweight title
20	Win	19–1	(Mexico) Maria Salinas	TKO	3 (10), 1:57	27 May 2017	Auditorio De La Expo, Ciudad Obregón, Mexico	Won WBC interim female light flyweight title
19	Win	18–1	(Mexico) Jessica Castillo	UD	8	10 Mar 2017	Grand Hotel, Tijuana, Mexico	
18	Win	17–1	(Mexico) Brenda Ramos	UD	6	1 Jul 2016	Grand Hotel, Tijuana, Mexico	
17	Win	16–1	(United States) Amaris Quintana	TKO	5 (6), 0:16	23 Apr 2016	(United States) The Forum, Inglewood, California, US	
16	Win	15–1	(Mexico) Katia Gutiérrez	TD	5 (8)	13 Nov 2015	Golden Lion Casino, Mexicali, Mexico	TD after Gutierrez cut from accidental head clash
15	Win	14–1	(Mexico) Lorena Arias	TKO	4 (6), 1:24	28 Aug 2015	Salon Mezzanine, Tijuana, Mexico	
14	Loss	13–1	(United States) Melissa McMorrow	SD	10	28 Feb 2015	Centro De Convenciones, Rosarito Beach, Mexico	Lost WBO female flyweight title
13	Win	13–0	(Mexico) Ana Arrazola	UD	10	21 Nov 2014	(United States) Crown Plaza Hotel, San Diego, California, US	Won vacant WBO female flyweight title
12	Win	12–0	(Mexico) Mayela Perez	UD	8	4 Sep 2014	(United States) Crown Plaza Hotel, San Diego, California, US	
11	Win	11–0	(United States) Jolene Blackshear	TKO	7 (8), 1:26	4 Apr 2015	(United States) Four Points Sheraton Hotel, San Diego, California, US	Won vacant WBC-NABF female light flyweight title
10	Win	10–0	(United States) Noemi Bosques	UD	6	28 Feb 2014	(United States) Crown Plaza Hotel, San Diego, California, US	
9	Win	9–0	(Mexico) Selene Lopez	TKO	1 (6), 1:16	31 Jan 2014	Caliente Racetrack, Tijuana, Mexico	
8	Win	8–0	(Mexico) Kareli Lopez	UD	6	23 Oct 2013	Salon Las Pugas, Tijuana, Mexico	
7	Win	7–0	(United States) Gloria Salas	PTS	4 (6), 1:36	19 Jun 2013	Salon Las Pugas, Tijuana, Mexico	
6	Win	6–0	(Mexico) Rosa Diaz	TKO	1 (6), 1:02	10 Apr 2013	Salon Las Pugas, Tijuana, Mexico	
5	Win	5–0	(United States) Blanca Raymundo	UD	4	27 Feb 2013	Salon Las Pugas, Tijuana, Mexico	
4	Win	4–0	(Mexico) Brenda Flores	UD	4	19 Dec 2012	Salon Las Pugas, Tijuana, Mexico	
3	Win	3–0	(Mexico) Carol Castro Madrid	KO	2 (4), 1:25	25 Oct 2012	Salon Las Pugas, Tijuana, Mexico	
2	Win	2–0	(Mexico) Angelica Dominguez	UD	4	16 Aug 2012	Salon Las Pugas, Tijuana, Mexico	
1	Win	1–0	(Mexico) Guadalupe Valdez	KO	1 (4), 0:46	6 Jul 2012	Salon Las Pugas, Tijuana, Mexico	

== Mixed martial arts record ==
Professional record breakdown
3 matches	3 wins	0 losses
By knockout	2	0
By decision	1	0

Res.	Record	Opponent	Method	Event	Date	Round	Time	Location	Notes
Win	3–0	CaySea McBride	TKO (punches)	Combate Global: Enriquez vs. McBride	March 12, 2026	1	1:10	Burbank, California, United States	
Win	2–0	Hannah Brobyskov	TKO (punches)	Combate Global: Enriquez vs. Brobyskov	July 17, 2025	2	3:18	Miami, Florida, United States	
Win	1–0	Hayley Valentine	Decision (unanimous)	Combate Global: Female 1	March 13, 2025	3	5:00	Miami, Florida, United States	Strawweight debut.
