= Janeth Pérez (boxer) =

Mexican boxer (born 1989)

Personal information
- Nickname: Cuisilla
- Born: Janeth Pérez Vigil; December 5, 1989 (age 36) Zapopan, Jalisco, Mexico
- Height: 5 ft 3 in (160 cm)
- Weight: Bantamweight; Super bantamweight; Featherweight; Super featherweight

Boxing career
- Reach: 63 in (160 cm)
- Stance: Orthodox

Boxing record
- Total fights: 33
- Wins: 25
- Win by KO: 7
- Losses: 6
- Draws: 2

Janeth Pérez Vigil (born December 5, 1989) is a Mexican professional boxer.

== Professional career ==
Pérez turned professional in 2008 and compiled a record of 12–0–1 before facing and defeating Yolis Marrugo Franco via seventh round technical knockout to win the vacant WBA female bantamweight title at the Lobodome, Mazatlán, Sinaloa, Mexico, on 16 July 2011.

She defended the title three times before losing it to fellow countrywoman Irma García by unanimous decision at Deportivo del Sindicato del Metro in Mexico City, Mexico, on 5 January 2013. Pérez lost a rematch against García via split decision at Unidad Deportiva El Chamizal, Zamora, Mexico, on 6 April 2013.

== Professional boxing record ==
33 fights	25 wins	6 losses
By knockout	7	1
By decision	18	5
Draws	2	

No.	Result	Record	Opponent	Type	Round, time	Date	Location	Notes
33	Win	25–6–2	Alondra Ballesteros Ocegueda	TKO	5 (6)	2025-04-26	Jamay, Mexico	
32	Loss	24–6–2	Maïva Hamadouche	TKO	6 (10)	2019-07-18	Theatre du Tivoli, Le Cannet, France	For IBF super-featherweight title
31	Loss	24–5–2	Ewa Brodnicka	MD	10	2019-05-25	Hala widowiskowo-sportowa, ul. Złotnicza 12, Jelenia Góra, Poland	For WBO super-featherweight title
30	Win	24–4–2	Evelin Torres	TKO	1 (6)	2018-10-19	Coliseo Luis Donaldo Colosio, Jamay, Mexico	
29	Win	23–4–2	Leticia Uribe Mejia	UD	10	2018-03-22	Palenque de la Feria, Ciudad Valles, Mexico	Won vacant WBC FECOMBOX featherweight title
28	Win	22–4–2	Maria Cerda Ochoa	TKO	4 (8)	2017-12-16	Salonsito Mexico, Jamay, Mexico	
27	Win	21–4–2	Alma Lizeth de la Cruz Rivas	MD	8	2015-08-29	Palenque de las Fiestas de Octubre, Zapopan, Mexico	
26	Loss	20–4–2	Carolina Rodríguez	MD	10	2014-12-12	Arena de Puente Alto, Puente Alto, Chile	For IBF bantamweight title
25	Win	20–3–2	Brenda Olvera	UD	6	2014-08-16	Centro de Convenciones Azul, Zihuatanejo, Mexico	
24	Loss	19–3–2	Carolina Rodríguez	MD	10	2014-05-10	Arena Solidaridad, Monterrey, Mexico	Lost IBF bantamweight title
23	Win	19–2–2	Galina Ivanova	SD	10	2013-11-30	Deportivo Agustín Ramos Millan, Toluca, Mexico	Won vacant IBF bantamweight title
22	Win	18–2–2	Maria Elena Villalobos	SD	10	2013-07-06	Auditorio General Arteaga, Querétaro, Mexico	
21	Loss	17–2–2	Irma García	SD	10	2013-04-06	Unidad Deportiva El Chamizal, Zamora, Mexico	For WBA bantamweight title
20	Loss	17–1–2	Irma García	UD	10	2013-01-05	Deportivo del Sindicato del Metro, Mexico City, Mexico	Lost WBA bantamweight title
19	Win	17–0–2	Tenkai Tsunami	UD	10	2012-10-06	Palenque de la Feria, Tepic, Mexico	Retained WBA bantamweight title
18	Win	16–0–2	Riyo Togo	UD	10	2012-07-14	Palenque de la Feria, Tepic, Mexico	Retained WBA bantamweight title
17	Win	15–0–2	Magdalena Leija	UD	8	2012-05-17	Expo Feria, Morelia, Mexico	
16	Draw	14–0–2	Magali Rodriguez	MD	8	2012-02-04	Gimnasio de las Liebres, Río Bravo, Mexico	
15	Win	14–0–1	Yanina Natalia Acuna	UD	10	2011-10-15	Centro Internacional de Convenciones, Chetumal, Mexico	Retained WBA bantamweight title
14	Win	13–0–1	Yolis Marrugo Franco	TKO	7 (10)	2011-07-16	Lobodome, Mazatlán, Mexico	Won vacant WBA bantamweight title
13	Win	12–0–1	Maria Camacho Barrios	TKO	4 (10)	2011-05-27	Arena Jalisco, Guadalajara, Mexico	
12	Draw	11–0–1	Maria Elena Villalobos	SD	10	2011-04-01	Arena Jalisco, Guadalajara, Mexico	Retained Mexican super-bantamweight title
11	Win	11–0	Rocio Castillo	UD	10	2011-01-29	Arena Coliseo, Guadalajara, Mexico	Won Mexican super-bantamweight title
10	Win	10–0	Magali Rodriguez	UD	8	2010-12-10	Arena Jalisco, Guadalajara, Mexico	
9	Win	9–0	Alma Lizeth de la Cruz Rivas	UD	4	2010-10-23	Explanada, El Grullo, Mexico	
8	Win	8–0	Rocio Castillo	MD	6	2010-08-20	Arena Jalisco, Guadalajara, Mexico	
7	Win	7–0	Maricela Loyola Rodriguez	TKO	2 (6)	2010-07-09	Arena Jalisco, Guadalajara, Mexico	
6	Win	6–0	Miriam Victoria	UD	6	2010-05-14	Arena Coliseo, Guadalajara, Mexico	
5	Win	5–0	Nayeli Jimenez Garcia	UD	6	2010-04-09	Arena Jalisco, Guadalajara, Mexico	
4	Win	4–0	Diana Rosales	UD	4	2009-12-20	Casino Monte Real, Jamay, Mexico	
3	Win	3–0	Salma Canales	UD	4	2009-11-20	Arena Coliseo, Guadalajara, Mexico	
2	Win	2–0	Isabel Lopez	UD	4	2008-12-05	Arena Jalisco, Guadalajara, Mexico	
1	Win	1–0	Salma Canales	RTD	4 (4)	2008-11-14	Arena Jalisco, Guadalajara, Mexico	

== See also ==
- List of female boxers

Sporting positions
Regional boxing titles
Preceded by Rocio Castillo	Mexican super-bantamweight champion January 29, 2011 – July 16, 2011; Won world title	Vacant
Vacant Title last held by Yareli Larios	WBC FECOMBOX featherweight champion March 22, 2018 – July 16, 2011; Won world title	Vacant
World boxing titles
Vacant Title last held by Emanuela Pantani	WBA bantamweight champion July 16, 2011 – January 5, 2013	Succeeded by Irma García
Vacant Title last held by Yazmín Rivas	IBF bantamweight champion November 30, 2013 – May 10, 2014	Succeeded by Carolina Rodríguez
