= Malvinas Argentinas (disambiguation) =

Malvinas Argentinas Partido is a partido (county) in Buenos Aires Province, Argentina.

Malvinas Argentinas may also refer to:

- Malvinas Argentinas, Córdoba, a town in Córdoba Province, Argentina
- Estadio Malvinas Argentinas, a stadium in the city of Mendoza, Argentina
- Ushuaia – Malvinas Argentinas International Airport, Ushuaia, Argentina
- Falkland Islands sovereignty dispute, a territorial dispute between Argentina and the United Kingdom

== See also ==
- Malvinas (disambiguation)
- Malvina (disambiguation)
- Falklands (disambiguation)
