= Nataly Delgado =

Panamanian boxer (born 1994)

Personal information
- Born: Nataly Estefany Delgado Hernández; September 15, 1994 (age 32) Santiago de Veraguas, Panama
- Height: 5 ft 0 in (152 cm)
- Weight: Flyweight; Super flyweight

Boxing career
- Stance: Orthodox

Boxing record
- Total fights: 31
- Wins: 21
- Win by KO: 5
- Losses: 8
- Draws: 2

Nataly Estefany Delgado Hernández (born September 15, 1994) is a Panamanian professional boxer. She has held the WBA female super-flyweight title in 2026.

== Professional career ==
Delgado turned professional in 2014 and compiled a record of 8–4–1 before challenging IBF female super-flyweight champion Micaela Luján at Estadio José María Gatica in Villa Mercedes, Argentina, on November 26, 2021, losing by unanimous decision.

Almost five years later, on June 13, 2026, she got a second chance at claiming a world title when she faced the previously undefeated WBA female super-flyweight champion Jasmine Artiga at Caribe Royale in Orlando, Florida. United States, and this time she was successful with a unanimous decision win.

Delgado lost the title on a unanimous decision in an unification fight against IBF title holder Irma García at College Park Center, Arlington, Texas, United States, on November 8, 2026.

== Professional boxing record ==
31 fights	21 wins	8 losses
By knockout	5	0
By decision	16	8
Draws	2	

No.	Result	Record	Opponent	Type	Round, time	Date	Location	Notes
31	Loss	21–8–2	Irma García	UD	10	Nov 8, 2026	College Park Center, Arlington, Texas, U.S.	Lost WBA female super-flyweight title, for IBF female super-flyweight title
30	Win	21–7–2	Jasmine Artiga	UD	10	Jun 13, 2026	Caribe Royale Orlando, Orlando, Florida, U.S.	Won WBA female super-flyweight title
29	Win	20–7–2	Yoselin Fernandez	UD	10	Mar 28, 2026	Centro de Convenciones Crowne Plaza, Managua, Nicaragua	Retained Interim WBA female super-flyweight title
28	Win	19–7–2	Arlenn Lisset Sanchez Aguirre	UD	10	Dec 6, 2025	Hotel Gran David, Santiago de Veraguas, Panama	Retained Interim WBA female super-flyweight title
27	Win	18–7–2	Maribel Ramírez	UD	10	Jul 18, 2025	Atheyna Bylon Champions Land Training Center, Panama City, Panama	Won Interim WBA female super-flyweight title
26	Win	17–7–2	Eloisa Martinez Zarraga	UD	8	Mar 29, 2025	Hotel El Panamá, Panama City, Panama	
25	Win	16–7–2	Rini Khoudari	UD	10	Nov 29, 2024	Coliseo De Combates, Panama City, Panama	Retained WBA Latin American female super-flyweight title
24	Win	15–7–2	Bethy Franco	UD	10	Jul 27, 2024	Arena de Colon, Colón, Panama	Retained WBA Latin American female super-flyweight title
23	Win	14–7–2	Johana Zuniga	UD	10	Apr 20, 2024	Everest Cricket Club Ground, Georgetown, Guyana	Won WBA Latin American female super-flyweight title
22	Win	13–7–2	Bethy Franco	UD	6	Dec 1, 2023	Coliseo De Combates, Panama City, Panama	
21	Draw	12–7–2	Kimberlin Reina	MD	6	Jul 15, 2023	District Bar De La 93, Bogotá, Colombia	
20	Win	12–7–1	Estefania Matute	UD	6	Jun 3, 2023	Georgetown, Guyana	
19	Win	11–7–1	Paola Rincon	UD	6	Mar 18, 2023	Hotel El Panamá, Panama City, Panama	
18	Loss	10–7–1	Diana Laura Fernandez	UD	8	Dec 15, 2022	Ciudad Juárez, Mexico	
17	Win	10–6–1	Estefania Alvarado	RTD	6 (6)	Jul 16, 2022	Los Andes Mall, Panama City, Panama	
16	Win	9–6–1	Osiris Renteria	RTD	2 (6)	May 20, 2022	Arena Panama Al Brown, Colón, Panama	
15	Loss	8–6–1	Clara Lescurat	SD	10	Mar 11, 2022	Majestic Casino, Panama City, Panama	For vacant WBA Gold super-flyweight title
14	Loss	8–5–1	Gabriela Fundora	UD	8	Jan 14, 2022	Centro De Convenciones Vasco Núñez De Balboa, Panama City, Panama	
13	Loss	8–4–1	Micaela Luján	UD	10	Nov 26, 2021	Estadio José María Gatica, Villa Mercedes, Argentina	For IBF super-flyweight title
12	Win	8–3–1	Eloisa Martinez Zarraga	UD	6	Oct 1, 2021	Centro De Convenciones Vasco Núñez De Balboa, Panama City, Panama	
11	Loss	7–3–1	Yaditza Perez	UD	8	Feb 7, 2020	Roberto Durán Arena, Panama City, Panama	
10	Win	7–2–1	Iliana Bonilla	SD	4	Aug 21, 2019	Bohios Alegres, Panama City, Panama	
9	Win	6–2–1	Marlene Aguilar	UD	4	Nov 24, 2017	Fantastic Casino De Albrook Mall, Panama City, Panama	
8	Win	5–2–1	Osiris Renteria	TKO	1 (4)	Aug 31, 2017	Bohios Alegres, Panama City, Panama	
7	Loss	4–2–1	Eva Guzman	SD	8	Dec 3, 2016	Palacio Dorado, Panama City, Panama	
6	Win	4–1–1	Janeth Asprilla	UD	4	Nov 5, 2016	Jardin Tacita De Oro, Parita, Panama	
5	Loss	3–1–1	Luiciel Quiel	MD	6	Apr 21, 2016	Parque V Centenario, Panama City, Panama	
4	Win	3–0–1	Iliana Bonilla	UD	4	Mar 5, 2016	Turicentro De Tocumen, Panama City, Panama	
3	Win	2–0–1	Zuseth Hoyte	TKO	1 (4), 0:17	Nov 20, 2015	Arena Panama Al Brown, Colón, Panama	
2	Draw	1–0–1	María Milano	MD	4	Oct 4, 2014	Gimnasio Municipal, 24 de Diciembre, Panama	
1	Win	1–0	Kelly Patino	TKO	1 (4), 1:48	Aug 2, 2014	Gimnasio Municipal, Puerto Armuelles, Panama	

== See also ==
- List of female boxers

Sporting positions
Regional boxing titles
Vacant Title last held by Olga Julio	WBA Latin American super-flyweight champion April 20, 2024 – July 18, 2025; Won interim title	Vacant Title next held by Roxana Mendoza
World boxing titles
Vacant Title last held by Linda Laura Lecca	WBA super-flyweight champion Interim title July 18, 2025 – June 13, 2026; Won world title	Vacant
Preceded by Jasmine Artiga	WBA super-flyweight champion June 13, 2026 – November 8, 2026	Succeeded by Irma García
