= Carolina Rodríguez =

Carolina Rodríguez may refer to:

- Carolina Rodríguez (boxer) (born 1983), Chilean boxer
- Carolina Rodríguez (cyclist) (born 1993), Mexican cyclist
- Carolina Rodríguez (gymnast) (born 1986), Spanish rhythmic gymnast
