= Jasmine Artiga =

American boxer (born 1992)

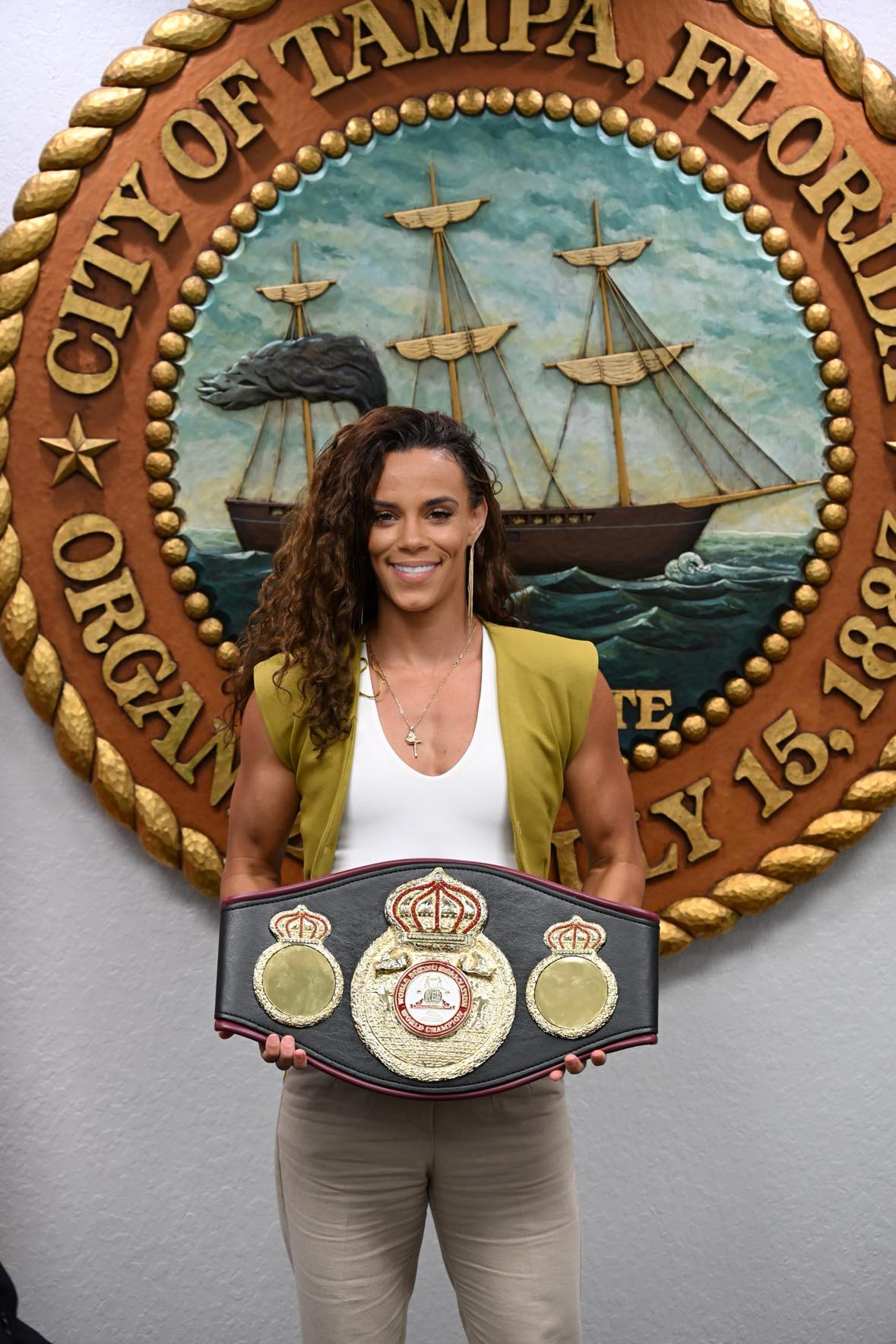
- Jasmine Artiga Tampa's first native born professional boxer to win major world title.

Personal information
- Nickname: The Animal
- Born: 5 April 1992 (age 34) Tampa, Florida, U.S.
- Height: 5 ft 4 in (163 cm)
- Weight: Super flyweight

Boxing career
- Reach: 64 in (163 cm)
- Stance: Orthodox

Boxing record
- Total fights: 17
- Wins: 15
- Win by KO: 7
- Losses: 1
- Draws: 1

Jasmine Artiga (born 5 April 1992) is an American professional boxer. She is a former WBA female super-flyweight champion.

== Career ==
Having completed high school, Artiga played American football in the LFL for the Tampa Breeze before taking up boxing aged 21.

She turned professional in May 2017, and compiled a record of 12 wins and a draw from her first 13 pro-fights.

Artiga faced Regina Chavez for the vacant WBA female super-flyweight title at the NOS Events Center in San Bernardino, California on 22 March 2025. She won via majority decision with two of the ringside judges scoring the fight 98–92 and 96–94 in her favour, while the third had it a 95–95 draw.

On 27 May 2025, Artiga received a proclamation from the city of Tampa for being the first native-born professional boxer to win a major world title.

She signed with Jake Paul's Most Valuable Promotions in July 2025.

Artiga made the first defense of her title against Linn Sandström at the Caribe Royale Resort in Orlando, Florida, on 23 August 2025. She won by stoppage in the third round.

On 13 December 2025 at the same venue, Artiga successfully retained her title for a second time, defeating Stephanie Silva, who had failed to make the required weight and was therefore ineligible to win the championship, via unanimous decision.

Once again fighting at Caribe Royale in Orlando in her third defense, she lost her title, and unbeaten professional record, to Nataly Delgado by unanimous decision on 13 June 2026.

== Personal life ==
Artiga is of Cuban descent.

== Professional boxing record ==
17 fights	15 wins	1 loss
By knockout	7	0
By decision	8	1
Draws	1	

No.	Result	Record	Opponent	Type	Round, time	Date	Location	Notes
17	Loss	15–1–1	Nataly Delgado	UD	10	2026-06-13	Caribe Royale, Orlando, Florida, U.S.	Lost WBA female super-flyweight title
16	Win	15–0–1	Stephanie Silva	UD	10	2025-12-13	Caribe Royale, Orlando, Florida, U.S.	Retained WBA female super-flyweight title. Silva missed weight so title only on the line for Artiga
15	Win	14–0–1	Linn Sandström	TKO	3 (10)	2025-08-23	Caribe Royale, Orlando, Florida, U.S.	Retained WBA female super-flyweight title
14	Win	13–0–1	Regina Chavez	MD	10	2025-03-22	Orange Show Events Center, San Bernardino, California, U.S.	Won vacant WBA female super-flyweight title
13	Win	12–0–1	Nancy Franco	TKO	1 (8)	2024-02-02	Caribe Royale, Orlando, Florida, U.S.	
12	Win	11–0–1	Josefina Vega	UD	8	2023-09-23	Caribe Royale, Orlando, Florida, U.S.	
11	Win	10–0–1	Ashley Sciscente	UD	8	2023-01-20	Kissimmee Civic Center, Kissimmee, Florida, U.S.	
10	Win	9–0–1	Amy Salinas	SD	6	2022-07-28	Fantasy Springs Resort Casino, Indio, California, U.S.	
9	Win	8–0–1	Randee Lynn Morales	TKO	2 (6)	2021-02-27	Caribe Royale, Orlando, Florida, U.S.	
8	Draw	7–0–1	Myrka Aguayo	SD	4	2020-02-29	Marriott Clearwater, St. Petersburg, Florida, U.S.	
7	Win	7–0	Judit Hachbold	UD	6	2019-09-21	Marriott Clearwater, St. Petersburg, Florida, U.S.	
6	Win	6–0	Karen Dulin	UD	4	2019-05-11	Hilton Bayfront, St. Petersburg, Florida, U.S.	
5	Win	5–0	Ivana Coleman	UD	4	2018-03-09	Florida State Fairgrounds, East Lake-Orient Park, Florida, U.S.	
4	Win	4–0	Ashley Garza	TKO	1 (4)	2018-01-13	Frank Cochran Center, Meridian, Mississippi, U.S.	
3	Win	3–0	Kathryn Talley	TKO	2 (4)	2017-11-10	Bryan Glazer Family JCC Auditorium, Tampa, Florida, U.S.	
2	Win	2–0	Dallas Shuman	TKO	1 (4)	2017-07-29	Climb Event Center, Gulfport, Mississippi, U.S.	
1	Win	1–0	Mistery Neal	KO	1 (4)	2017-05-13	Frank Cochran Center, Meridian, Mississippi, U.S.	

== See also ==
- List of female boxers

Sporting positions
World boxing titles
Vacant Title last held by Clara Lescurat	WBA super-flyweight champion March 22, 2025 – June 13, 2026	Succeeded by Nataly Delgado
