= Irma García (boxer) =

Mexican boxer (born 1981)

Irma Garcia
Personal information
- Nickname: Torbellino ("Whirlwind")
- Born: Irma Garcia Nuñez; June 22, 1981 (age 45) Mexico City, Mexico
- Height: 5 ft 6 in (168 cm)
- Weight: Super flyweight; Bantamweight

Boxing career
- Stance: Southpaw

Boxing record
- Total fights: 37
- Wins: 27
- Win by KO: 6
- Losses: 5
- Draws: 1
- No contests: 4

Irma Garcia Nuñez (born January 22, 1982) is a Mexican professional boxer. She is a two-weight world champion having held the IBF female super-flyweight title since November 2023 and the WBA female super-flyweight title since November 2026, after previously holding the WBA female bantamweight title from 2013 to 2015.

== Professional career ==
Garcia turned professional in 2010 and compiled a record of 5–0–1 (4 NC) before facing and defeating reigning champion Janeth Pérez by unanimous decision to win the WBA female bantamweight title at Deportivo del Sindicato del Metro in Mexico City, Mexico, on 5 January 2013. She defeated Pérez via split decision in a rematch at Unidad Deportiva El Chamizal, Zamora, Mexico, on 6 April 2013.

She vacated the title in 2015. Garcia would have to wait three years to challenge for another world title, losing a unanimous decision to Guadalupe Martínez Guzmán for the WBC female super-flyweight title at Centro de Convenciones in Tlalnepantla de Baz, Mexico, on 3 April 2018.

More than 10 years after first becoming a world champion, Garcia became a two-time and two-weight champion when she defeated Stephanie Silva via unanimous decision to win the vacant IBF super-flyweight title at Thunder Studios in Long Beach, California, USA, on 11 November 2023.

After retaining the title with a unanimous decision win over Gloria Gallardo in Ciudad Nicolás Romero, Mexico, on 14 December 2024, she defended it against Emma Dolan at Olympia London in London, England, on 5 April 2026, winning by technical knockout in the third round. Garcia beat WBA female super-flyweight champion Nataly Delgado on a unanimous decision in became unified female super-flyweight champion on 8 November 2026 at College Park Center, Arlington, Texas, United States.

== Professional boxing record ==
37 fights	27 wins	5 losses
By knockout	6	0
By decision	21	5
Draws	1	
No contests	4	

No.	Result	Record	Opponent	Type	Round, time	Date	Location	Notes
37	Win	27–5–1 (4)	Nataly Delgado	UD	10	2026-11-08	College Park Center, Arlington, Texas, U.S.	Retained IBF female super-flyweight title; Won WBA female super-flyweight title
36	Win	26–5–1 (4)	Emma Dolan	TKO	3 (10)	2026-04-05	Olympia, London, England	Retained IBF female super-flyweight title
35	Win	25–5–1 (4)	Maria Martinez Sandoval	TKO	6 (8)	2025-06-14	Tlalnepantla de Baz, Mexico	
34	Win	24–5–1 (4)	Gloria Gallardo	UD	10	2024-12-14	Ciudad Nicolás Romero, Mexico	Retained IBF female super-flyweight title
33	Win	23–5–1 (4)	Stephanie Silva	UD	10	2023-11-11	Thunder Studios, Long Beach, California, U.S.	Won vacant IBF female super-flyweight title
32	Win	22–5–1 (4)	Paola Rincon	UD	8	2023-02-18	Playa del Carmen, Mexico	
31	Loss	21–5–1 (4)	Micaela Luján	MD	10	2022-08-20	Estadio Único de Villa Mercedes, Villa Mercedes, Argentina	For IBF female super-flyweight title
30	Win	21–4–1 (4)	Celia Roman	TKO	2 (8)	2022-03-26	El Palenque de la Feria, Pachuca, Mexico	
29	Win	20–4–1 (4)	Jessica Martinez Castillo	UD	8	2021-11-12	Salon de Eventos Silva, Ecatepec de Morelos, Mexico	
28	Loss	19–4–1 (4)	Daniela Romina Bermúdez	UD	10	2019-03-30	Club Huracán, Tres Arroyos, Argentina	For WBO female bantamweight title
27	Win	19–3–1 (4)	Isis Vargas Perez	SD	8	2018-12-01	Arena Pavillón del Norte, Saltillo, Mexico	
26	Loss	18–3–1 (4)	Guadalupe Martínez Guzmán	UD	10	2018-02-03	Centro de Convenciones, Tlalnepantla de Baz, Mexico	For WBC female super-flyweight title
25	Win	18–2–1 (4)	Susy Kandy Sandoval	MD	8	2017-10-07	Gimnasio de la AUT, Tampico, Mexico	
24	Win	17–2–1 (4)	Judith Rodriguez	UD	8	2017-04-29	Gimnasio Manuel Bernardo Aguirre, Chihuahua City, Mexico	
23	Loss	16–2–1 (4)	Mariana Juárez	MD	10	2016-12-17	Grand Oasis Arena, Cancún, Mexico	Lost WBC female International bantamweight title
22	Win	16–1–1 (4)	Leticia Uribe Mejia	TKO	8 (8)	2016-10-29	Palenque de Gomez Palacio, Gómez Palacio, Mexico	
21	Win	15–1–1 (4)	Ana Maria Lozano	UD	8	2016-09-03	Deportivo Zaragoza, Atizapán de Zaragoza, Mexico	
20	Win	14–1–1 (4)	Miriam Avila	UD	10	2016-06-04	Oasis Hotel Complex, Cancún, Mexico	
19	Win	13–1–1 (4)	Yesenia Tovar	UD	10	2015-12-19	Deportivo Tlalli, Tlalnepantla de Baz, Mexico	Won vacant WBC female International bantamweight title
18	Win	12–1–1 (4)	Marisa Joana Portillo	UD	8	2015-06-19	Salon Sindicato Secc. 47 de Pemex, Ciudad del Carmen, Mexico	
17	Win	11–1–1 (4)	Simone Aparecida da Silva	UD	10	2014-09-20	Estadio de Beisbol, Guamúchil, Mexico	
16	Win	10–1–1 (4)	Honey Mae Bermoy	TKO	4 (10)	2014-05-31	Sala de Armas Agustín Melgar, Iztacalco, Mexico	
15	Win	9–1–1 (4)	Nazly Maldonado	UD	10	2014-02-08	Caballerizas de Huixquilucan, Huixquilucan, Mexico	
14	Win	8–1–1 (4)	Magali Rodriguez	MD	10	2013-11-02	Auditorio General Arteaga, Querétaro, Mexico	
13	Loss	7–1–1 (4)	Jessica Gonzalez	SD	10	2013-08-31	Gimnasio Olímpico Juan de la Barrera, Mexico City, Mexico	
12	Win	7–0–1 (4)	Janeth Pérez	SD	10	2013-04-06	Unidad Deportiva El Chamizal, Zamora, Mexico	Retained WBA female bantamweight title
11	Win	6–0–1 (4)	Janeth Pérez	UD	10	2013-01-05	Deportivo del Sindicato del Metro, Mexico City, Mexico	Won WBA female bantamweight title
10	Win	5–0–1 (4)	Rocio Castillo	UD	6	2012-12-08	Centro Banamex, Mexico City, Mexico	
9	Win	4–0–1 (4)	Laura Serrano	PTS	8	2012-09-08	Gimnasio Miguel Alemán Valdez, Celaya, Mexico	
8	Win	3–0–1 (4)	Fredee Gonzalez	TKO	4 (6)	2012-08-04	Foro Polanco, Polanco, Mexico	
7	Win	2–0–1 (4)	Nazly Maldonado	UD	8	2012-04-28	Foro Polanco, Polanco, Mexico	
6	Win	1–0–1 (4)	Julia Hernandez	UD	8	2012-03-30	Foro Polanco, Polanco, Mexico	
5	NC	0–0–1 (4)	Yazmín Rivas	NC	6 (6)	2011-04-09	Polyforum Chiapas, Tuxtla Gutiérrez, Mexico	Unsanctioned bout
4	NC	0–0–1 (3)	Blanca Iris Cueto	NC	5 (6)	2011-04-09	Polyforum Chiapas, Tuxtla Gutiérrez, Mexico	Unsanctioned bout
3	NC	0–0–1 (2)	Karolina Owczarz	NC	1 (6)	2011-04-02	Polyforum Chiapas, Tuxtla Gutiérrez, Mexico	Unsanctioned bout
2	NC	0–0–1 (1)	Jennifer Encarnacion	NC	1 (6)	2011-03-26	Polyforum Chiapas, Tuxtla Gutiérrez, Mexico	Unsanctioned bout
1	Draw	0–0–1	Andrea Miranda Cortina	TD	2 (4)	2010-05-01	Club Deportivo la Perla, Ciudad Nezahualcóyotl, Mexico	

== See also ==
- List of female boxers
- List of southpaw stance boxers

Sporting positions
Regional boxing titles
Vacant Title last held by Susie Ramadan	WBC International bantamweight champion December 19, 2015 – December 17, 2016	Succeeded by Mariana Juárez
World boxing titles
Preceded by Janeth Pérez	WBA bantamweight champion January 5, 2013 – March 8, 2015; Vacated	Succeeded by Mayerlin Rivas; Promoted from interim champion
Vacant Title last held by Micaela Luján	IBF super-flyweight champion November 11, 2023 – present	Incumbent
