= Guadalupe Martínez Guzmán =

Mexican boxer (born 1992)

Personal information
- Nickname: Lupita
- Born: 5 April 1992 (age 34) Tlalnepantla, State of Mexico, Mexico
- Height: 157 cm (5 ft 2 in)
- Weight: Light flyweight; Flyweight; Super flyweight

Boxing career
- Reach: 162 cm (64 in)
- Stance: Orthodox

Boxing record
- Total fights: 32
- Wins: 20
- Win by KO: 6
- Losses: 12

Guadalupe Martínez Guzmán (born 5 April 1992) is a Mexican professional boxer who held the WBC female super flyweight title from 2017 to December 2020.

== Professional career ==
Guzmán made her professional debut on 7 July 2012, scoring a four-round unanimous decision (UD) over Maria Munos at the Palenque de la Feria in Chilpancingo, Mexico. All three judges scored the bout 39–37.

After compiling a record of 4–2 (3 KOs), she faced Daniela Romina Bermúdez (12–2–2, 2 KOs) for the WBA interim female super flyweight title on 12 April 2013, at the Centro Cosmopolita Unión y Progreso in Roldán, Argentina. Guzmán suffered the third defeat of her career by UD (100–91.5, 100–91, 100–90.5). Her next fight was against Ana Arrazola (17–9–2, 13 KOs) for the vacant WBF female light flyweight title against on 17 August at the Hotel Paraiso Caxcan in Apozol, Mexico. Guzmán again lost by UD with all three judges scoring the bout 100–90.

After winning her next two fights, both by UD, she faced undefeated IBF female super flyweight champion Débora Dionicius (14–0, 4 KOs) on 20 December at the Club Social y Cultural El Cruce in Malvinas Argentinas, Argentina. Guzmán lost by UD with all three judges scoring the bout 100–90. For her next fight she moved down in weight to challenge IBF female junior flyweight champion Naoko Shibata (11–3, 3 KOs) on 3 March 2014 at the Korakuen Hall in Tokyo, Japan. Guzmán lost in her fourth world title attempt by UD with the scorecards reading 98–92, 98–93 and 99–91. She won her next fight by split decision (SD) before making a second attempt at the WBA interim female super flyweight title, this time against Linda Laura Lecca on 30 August at the Complejo Deportivo "El Cancherín" in Huarochirí, Peru. Guzmán lost by UD with all three judges scoring the bout 100–90.

Her next fight was against Ava Knight (12–2–3, 5 KOs) for the WBC International female flyweight title. The fight took place on 13 November at Washington Hilton & Towers in Washington, D.C., Guzmán again lost by UD, with all three judges scoring the bout 100–90. After a UD win the following month, she captured the WBC Silver female super flyweight title against Judith Rodriguez (8–7, 5 KOs) on 24 April 2015 at Foro Polanco in Mexico City, Mexico. Two judges scored the bout 99–91 and the third scored it 98–92. After securing three more wins, defending her WBC Silver title once, she lost a fifth-round technical decision (TD) to Jasseth Noriega (17–4–2, 5 KOs) in October 2016.

Guzmán bounced back with two UD wins before facing WBC female super flyweight champion Zulina Muñoz (48–1–2, 28 KOs) on 13 May 2017 at the Grand Oasis Arena in Cancún, Mexico. In what was described as a "huge upset", Guzmán defeated the long-reigning champion via UD, with two judges scoring the bout 96–93 and the third scoring it 95–94.

In her fifth defense, Guzmán lost her title on 12 December 2020, suffering a unanimous decision defeat against Lourdes Juárez at Studios Televisa, Mexico City, Mexico. The ringside judges' scores were 97–93, 97-93 and 96–93.

== Professional boxing record ==
32 fights	20 wins	12 losses
By knockout	6	0
By decision	14	12

No.	Result	Record	Opponent	Type	Round, time	Date	Location	Notes
32	Loss	20–12	(Mexico) Diana Laura Fernandez	UD	10	28 Apr 2023	Ciudad Juarez, Chihuahua, Mexico	
31	Loss	20–11	(Mexico) Mayeli Flores	MD	6	23 Sep 2022	Grand Oasis Arena, Cancun, Mexico	
30	Loss	20–10	(Mexico) Lourdes Juárez	UD	10	12 Dec 2020	Studios Televisa, Mexico City, Mexico	Lost WBC female super flyweight title
29	Win	20–9	(Mexico) Debani Balderas	UD	10	14 Dec 2019	Domo Deportivo, Tulum, Mexico	Retained WBC female super flyweight title
28	Win	19–9	(Mexico) Jessica Chávez	SD	10	27 Apr 2019	Centro Regional de Deporte de Las Américas, Ecatepec de Morelos, Mexico	Retained WBC female super flyweight title
27	Win	18–9	(Mexico) Yulihan Luna	UD	10	24 Nov 2018	Oasis Hotel Complex, Cancún, Mexico	
26	Win	17–9	(Mexico) Irma Garcia	UD	10	3 Feb 2018	Centro de Convenciones, Tlalnepantla de Baz, Mexico	Retained WBC female super flyweight title
25	Win	16–9	(Panama) Carlota Santos	TKO	9 (10), 1:15	30 Sep 2017	Grand Oasis Arena, Cancún, Mexico	Retained WBC female super flyweight title
24	Win	15–9	(Mexico) Zulina Muñoz	UD	10	13 May 2017	Grand Oasis Arena, Cancún, Mexico	Won WBC female super flyweight title
23	Win	14–9	(Mexico) Guadalupe Solis	UD	6	4 Feb 2017	Grand Oasis Arena, Cancún, Mexico	
22	Win	13–9	(Mexico) Leticia Uribe	UD	8	10 Dec 2016	Deportivo Maquio San Juan del Rio, San Juan Zitlaltepec, Mexico	
21	Loss	12–9	(Mexico) Jasseth Noriega	TD	5 (8), 1:15	15 Oct 2016	Centro de Usos Multiples, Mazatlán, Mexico	
20	Win	12–8	(Mexico) Yanely Hernandez	TKO	4 (8), 1:48	23 Jul 2016	Oasis Hotel Complex, Cancún, Mexico	
19	Win	11–8	(Mexico) Celeste Gonzalez	UD	10	27 Feb 2016	Gimnasio Olímpico Juan de la Barrera, Mexico City, Mexico	Retained WBC Silver female super flyweight title
18	Win	10–8	(Mexico) Maria Garcia	TKO	1 (8), 1:28	27 Nov 2015	Sindicato de Taxistas, Cancún, Mexico	
17	Win	9–8	(Mexico) Judith Rodriguez	UD	10	24 Apr 2015	Foro Polanco, Mexico City, Mexico	Won WBC Silver female super flyweight title
16	Win	8–8	(Mexico) Marisol Molina	UD	10	20 Dec 2014	Palenque de Ario de Rayón, Zamora, Mexico	
15	Loss	7–8	(United States) Ava Knight	UD	10	13 Nov 2014	(United States) Washington Hilton & Towers, Washington, D.C., U.S.	For vacant WBC International female flyweight title
14	Loss	7–7	(Peru) Linda Laura Lecca	UD	10	30 Aug 2014	Complejo Deportivo "El Cancherín", Huarochirí, Peru	For WBA interim female super flyweight title
13	Win	7–6	(Mexico) Dorely Valente	SD	8	17 May 2014	Arena Quequi, Playa del Carmen, Mexico	
12	Loss	6–6	(Japan) Naoko Shibata	UD	10	3 Mar 2014	Korakuen Hall, Tokyo, Japan	For IBF female junior flyweight title
11	Loss	6–5	(Argentina) Débora Dionicius	UD	10	20 Dec 2013	Club social y Cultural El Cruce, Malvinas Argentinas, Argentina	For IBF female super flyweight title
10	Win	6–4	(Mexico) Teresa Marquez	UD	8	26 Oct 2013	Auditorio Municipal, Agua Prieta, Mexico	
9	Win	5–4	(Mexico) Leo Coltazar	UD	4	6 Sep 2013	Auditorio San Nicholas, Ixmiquilpan, Mexico	
8	Loss	4–4	(Mexico) Ana Arrazola	UD	10	17 Aug 2013	Hotel Paraiso Caxcan, Apozol, Mexico	For vacant WBF female junior flyweight title
7	Loss	4–3	(Argentina) Daniela Romina Bermúdez	UD	10	12 Apr 2013	Centro Cosmopolito Unión y Progreso, Roldán, Argentina	For WBA interim female super flyweight title
6	Win	4–2	(Mexico) Mercedes Castro	TKO	6 (8), 1:26	16 Mar 2013	Gimnasio Marcelino Gonzalez, Zacatecas City, Mexico	
5	Win	3–2	(Mexico) Maria Jimenez	TKO	7 (8), 1:30	16 Feb 2013	Auditorio General Arteaga, Querétaro City, Mexico	
4	Win	2–2	(Mexico) Roxana Alanis	TKO	6 (8), 1:42	26 Dec 2012	Salon Marsella, Huixtla, Mexico	
3	Loss	1–2	(Mexico) Perla Hernandez	UD	6	15 Dec 2012	Auditorio Centenario, Gómez Palacio, Mexico	
2	Loss	1–1	(Mexico) Perla Hernandez	UD	4	25 Aug 2012	Auditorio Municipal, Torreón, Mexico	
1	Win	1–0	(Mexico) Maria Munos	UD	4	7 Jul 2012	Palenque de la Feria, Chilpancingo, Mexico	

Sporting positions
Minor world boxing titles
Preceded by Judith Rodriguez	WBC Silver female super flyweight champion 24 April 2015 – April 2017	Vacant Title next held by Eva Voraberger
Major world boxing titles
Preceded by Zulina Muñoz	WBC female super flyweight champion 13 May 2017 – 12 December 2020	Succeeded by Lourdes Juárez
