= Malvinas (disambiguation) =

Malvinas is the Spanish name for the Falkland Islands, an archipelago in the south Atlantic Ocean which is a British Overseas Territory.

Malvinas, Malvinas Islands or Islas Malvinas may also refer to:

- Malvinas Islands (Chile), a group of islands in the General Carrera Lake, Chile
- Malvinas Day, a public holiday in Argentina
- Malvinas Current, an Atlantic current which is also known as the Falkland Current
- Estadio Islas Malvinas, home ground of Buenos Aires's All Boys club
- HMS Tiger Bay, a vessel of the Royal Navy until 1986, formerly PNA Islas Malvinas of the Argentine Naval Prefectureas
- Las Malvinas Airport, an airport in Peru

== See also ==
- Malvinas Argentinas Partido, Buenos Aires Province, Argentina
- Malvinas Argentinas, Córdoba, a municipality in Argentina
- "March of the Malvinas", an Argentine song composed in 1939
- Rosario – Islas Malvinas International Airport, Rosario, Argentina
- Malvina (disambiguation)
- Malvinas Argentinas (disambiguation)
- Falklands (disambiguation)
