= List of undefeated world boxing champions =

This is a list of world champions in professional boxing who retired undefeated, either during or after a title reign(s). It excludes current titleholders. Each champion's record is shown in the following format: wins–losses–draws, no contests.

== Undefeated male champions ==
As of March 2026, there have been 16 male boxing champions who finished their careers undefeated. The list includes boxers who were recognized by public acclamation before the era of sanctioning bodies and the creation of The Ring magazine, as well as boxers recognized by the NYSAC. The WBA (as the NBA), the WBC, the IBF, and the WBO began recognizing champions in 1921, 1963, 1983, and 1988 respectively, while The Ring began to do so in 1922.

| Boxer | Record (W-L-T) | Weight class (boxing) | Title(s) held | Championship years | Title defenses | Notes |
|---|---|---|---|---|---|---|
| Jimmy Barry | 61–0–10, 1NC | Bantamweight | World | 1894–1899 | 6 | Fought when the bantamweight category was not fully established. The weight limits in the United States shifted during his career. |
| Joe Calzaghe | 46–0 | Super middleweight | WBO | 1997–2008 | 21 | Vacated title to move up to light heavyweight. |
| Joe Calzaghe | 46–0 | Super middleweight | IBF | 2006 | 1 | Vacated title to fight Peter Manfredo Jr. instead of #1 contender Robert Stieglitz. |
| Joe Calzaghe | 46–0 | Super middleweight | The Ring | 2006–2008 | 3 | Vacated titles to move up to light heavyweight. |
| Joe Calzaghe | 46–0 | Super middleweight | WBA, WBC | 2007–2008 | 0 | Vacated titles to move up to light heavyweight. |
| Joe Calzaghe | 46–0 | Light heavyweight | The Ring | 2008 | 1 | Retired and vacated title. |
| Terence Crawford | 42–0 | Lightweight | WBO | 2014–2015 | 2 | Vacated title to move up to light welterweight. |
| Terence Crawford | 42–0 | Lightweight | The Ring | 2014–2015 | 0 | Vacated title to move up to light welterweight. |
| Terence Crawford | 42–0 | Light welterweight | WBO | 2015–2017 | 6 | Vacated title to move up to welterweight. |
| Terence Crawford | 42–0 | Light welterweight | WBC, The Ring | 2016–2018 | 3 | Vacated title to move up to welterweight. |
| Terence Crawford | 42–0 | Light welterweight | WBA (Super), IBF | 2017 | 0 | Vacated title to move up to welterweight. |
| Terence Crawford | 42–0 | Welterweight | WBO | 2018–2024 | 7 | Vacated title to move up to light middleweight. |
| Terence Crawford | 42–0 | Welterweight | WBA (Super), WBC, IBF, The Ring | 2023–2024 (Note: Stripped of the IBF title on November 9, 2023.) | 0 | Vacated title to move up to light middleweight. |
| Terence Crawford | 42–0 | Light middleweight | WBA | 2024–2025 | 0 | Also won the WBO interim title. Stripped and vacated of both titles to move up to super middleweight. |
| Terence Crawford | 42–0 | Super middleweight | WBC, IBF, WBO | 2025 | 0 | Stripped of the WBC title 13 days before retiring. |
| Terence Crawford | 42–0 | Super middleweight | WBA (Super), The Ring | 2025–2026 | 0 | Armando Reséndiz elevated to full WBA champion on January 1, 2026. |
| Kim Ji-won | 16–0–2 | Super bantamweight | IBF | 1985–1986 | 4 | |
| Mihai Leu | 28–0 | Welterweight | WBO | 1997 | 1 | Retired from boxing due to an injury. |
| Ricardo López | 51–0–1 | Minimumweight | WBC | 1990–1998 | 22 | Vacated title to move up to light flyweight. |
| Ricardo López | 51–0–1 | Minimumweight | WBO | 1997–1998 | 0 | Unified WBC and WBO titles. Stripped of WBO title for saying he wanted to give the belt to his father. |
| Ricardo López | 51–0–1 | Minimumweight | WBA | 1998 | 0 | Vacated title to move up to junior flyweight. |
| Ricardo López | 51–0–1 | Light flyweight | IBF | 1999–2002 | 2 | |
| Rocky Marciano | 49–0 | Heavyweight | World | 1952–1956 | 6 | |
| Terry Marsh | 26–0–1 | Light welterweight | IBF | 1987 | 1 | Retired from boxing due to epilepsy. |
| Floyd Mayweather Jr. | 50–0 | Super featherweight | WBC | 1998–2002 | 8 | Vacated title to move up to lightweight. |
| Floyd Mayweather Jr. | 50–0 | Lightweight | WBC, The Ring | 2002–2004 | 3 | Vacated title to move up to light welterweight. |
| Floyd Mayweather Jr. | 50–0 | Light welterweight | WBC | 2005–2006 | 0 | Vacated title to move up to welterweight. |
| Floyd Mayweather Jr. | 50–0 | Welterweight | IBF | 2006 | 0 | Vacated title to challenge Carlos Baldomir for his WBC title. |
| Floyd Mayweather Jr. | 50–0 | Welterweight | WBC, The Ring | 2006–2008, 2011–2015 | 6 | Retired in 2008, few months after defeating Ricky Hatton. Declared Emeritus Champion by the WBC. Reclaimed the title in 2011 by defeating Victor Ortiz. Retired at 49–0 in 2015; returned in 2017 for non-title McGregor fight and then retired again. |
| Floyd Mayweather Jr. | 50–0 | Welterweight | WBA | 2014–2015 | 3 | Retired in 2008, few months after defeating Ricky Hatton. Declared Emeritus Champion by the WBC. Reclaimed the title in 2011 by defeating Victor Ortiz. Retired at 49–0 in 2015; returned in 2017 for non-title McGregor fight and then retired again. |
| Floyd Mayweather Jr. | 50–0 | Light middleweight | WBC | 2007, 2013–2015 | 1 | Retired in 2008, few months after defeating Ricky Hatton. Declared Emeritus Champion by the WBC. Reclaimed the title in 2011 by defeating Victor Ortiz. Retired at 49–0 in 2015; returned in 2017 for non-title McGregor fight and then retired again. |
| Floyd Mayweather Jr. | 50–0 | Light middleweight | | 2012–2015 | | Retired in 2008, few months after defeating Ricky Hatton. Declared Emeritus Champion by the WBC. Reclaimed the title in 2011 by defeating Victor Ortiz. Retired at 49–0 in 2015; returned in 2017 for non-title McGregor fight and then retired again. |
| Jack McAuliffe | 27–0–10 | Lightweight | World | 1886–1893 | 9 | Title defences consist of seven wins and two draws. |
| Sven Ottke | 34–0 | Super middleweight | IBF | 1998–2004 | 21 | |
| Sven Ottke | 34–0 | Super middleweight | WBA | 2003–2004 | 4 | Defended IBF title and defeated WBA champion to become WBA Super champion. |
| Dmitry Pirog | 20–0 | Middleweight | WBO | 2010–2012 | 3 | Retired from boxing due to chronic spinal injuries. |
| Harry Simon | 31–0 | Light middleweight | WBO | 1998–2001 | 4 | Vacated title to move up to middleweight. |
| Harry Simon | 31–0 | Middleweight | WBO | 2002 | 0 | Won WBO interim middleweight title in 2001 and the outright title in 2002. Stripped of title at 22–0 when he was unable to defend it due to injuries suffered in a car crash. Had others non-title fights before retiring. |
| Pichit Sitbangprachan | 24–0 | Flyweight | IBF | 1992–1994 | 5 | Retired at 21–0 and then made a comeback. |
| Edwin Valero | 27–0 | Super featherweight | WBA | 2006–2008 | 4 | Vacated title to move up to lightweight. |
| Edwin Valero | 27–0 | Lightweight | WBC | 2009–2010 | 2 | Vacated title to move up to light welterweight. Committed suicide after allegedly killing his wife in 2010. All 27 fights were knockout wins. |
| Andre Ward | 32–0 | Super middleweight | WBA | 2009–2015 | 6 | Vacated titles in 2015 to move up to light heavyweight. |
| Andre Ward | 32–0 | Super middleweight | WBC, The Ring | 2011–2015 | 1 (WBC), 2 (The Ring) | Vacated titles in 2015 to move up to light heavyweight. |
| Andre Ward | 32–0 | Light heavyweight | WBA, WBO, IBF, The Ring | 2016–2017 | 1 (WBA, WBO, IBF), 0 (The Ring) | |

== Undefeated female champions ==
As of March 2026, 24 female champions have finished their careers undefeated. Includes world titles from sanctioning agencies outside of WBA, WBC, WBO, IBF, and also outside of The Ring. Female world titles were inaugurated by the WBA, the WBC, the WBO, and the IBF in 2004, 2005, 2009, and 2010 respectively. The Ring began awarding titles to women in 2019 and six of the fifteen weight classes are still uninaugurated (as of September 30, 2022).

| Boxer | Record | Weight class | Title(s) | Championship years | Title defenses | Notes |
|---|---|---|---|---|---|---|
| Michele Aboro | 21–0 | Super bantamweight | WIBF | 2000–2001 | 3 | |
| Nicola Adams | 5–0–1 | Flyweight | WBO | 2019 | 1 | Retired due to medical concerns. |
| Laila Ali | 24–0 | Super middleweight | IBA, WIBF | 2002–2004 | 4 (IBA), 2 (WIBF) | Inaugural IBA women's super-middleweight title. |
| Laila Ali | 24–0 | Super middleweight | WIBA | 2002–2007 | 5 | |
| Laila Ali | 24–0 | Super middleweight | WBC | 2006–2007 | 2 | Inaugural WBC women's super-middleweight title. |
| Laila Ali | 24–0 | Light heavyweight | WIBF | 2004 | 0 | |
| Natascha Ragosina | 22–0 | Super middleweight | WIBF | 2005–2009 | 10 | |
| Natascha Ragosina | 22–0 | Super middleweight | GBU | 2006–2009 | 7 | |
| Natascha Ragosina | 22–0 | Super middleweight | WBA, WBC, WIBA | 2007–2009 | 6 (WBA), 4 (WBC), 2 (WIBA) | Inaugural WBA women's super-middleweight title. |
| Natascha Ragosina | 22–0 | Super middleweight | IWBF | 2008–2009 | 0 | |
| Natascha Ragosina | 22–0 | Heavyweight | WIBF, WBF | 2009 | 0 | Won the inaugural WBF women's heavyweight title, and the only title fight in the division, that was until Clarresa Shields won the Vacant title in July 27 2024 against Vanessa Lepage-Joanisse. |
| Lucia Rijker | 17–0 | Super lightweight, Junior welterweight | WIBF, WIBO | 1997–1998 | 0 | |
| Kara Ro | 18–0 | Lightweight | WIBA | 2005 | 0 | Vacated title. |
| Wang Ya Nan | 8–0 | Middleweight | WIBA | 2007–2009 | 3 | |
| Wang Ya Nan | 8–0 | Middleweight | WBC | 2008–2009 | 2 | |
| Seniesa Estrada | 26–0 | Mini flyweight, Light flyweight, Flyweight | WBC, WBA, WBO, IBF, The Ring | 2018–2024 | 8 | |
| Ryu Myung-Ok | 5–0–1 | Super flyweight | WBC | 2005 2007-2008 | 2 | Title vacated due to inactivity. |
| Kim Kwang-Ok | 5–0 | Bantamweight | WBC | 2005-2006 | 2 | Title vacated due to inactivity. |
| Eun Soon-Choi | 3‐0 | Light flyweight | WBC | 2005-2006 | 0 | Title vacated due to inactivity. |
| Mako Yamada | 7–0 | Mini flyweight | WBO | 2014 | 0 | Yamada submitted a retirement notification to the Japanese Boxing Commission on 31 May 2014. The belt was vacated on the same day. |
| Kasumi Saeki | 4–0 | Mini flyweight | WBO | 2019 | 0 | |
| Gao Li Jun | 3–0 | Featherweight | WBA | 2006 | 0 | |
| Emanuela Pantani | 10–0 | Bantamweight | WBA | 2008 | 0 | |
| Alejandra Jiménez | 12–0–1 1 NC | Heavyweight | WBC | 2016-2017 | 2 | |
| Giselle Salandy | 16–0 | Super welterweight | WBC, WBA | 2006–2009 | 5 | Salandy died in a motor vehicle collision on the morning of 4 January 2009 |
| Giselle Salandy | 16–0 | Super welterweight | IWBF | 2006–2009 | 2 | |
| Giselle Salandy | 16–0 | Super welterweight | WIBA | 2007–2009 | 3 | |
| Giselle Salandy | 16–0 | Super welterweight | WIBF | 2008–2009 | 1 | |
| Paola Gabriela Casalinuovo | 12–0 | Super welterweight | IBF | 2014 | 1 | |
| Jenifer Alcorn | 18–0 | Lightweight | WIBF | 2002–2004 | 0 | |
| Jenifer Alcorn | 18–0 | Lightweight | IWBF | 2003–2004 | 0 | |
| Jenifer Alcorn | 18–0 | Lightweight | WIBA | 2003–2004 | 0 | |
| Clara Lescurat | 11-0 | Super flyweight | WBA | 2022–2024 | 4 | |
| Flor Maria Delgado | 12-0 | Heavyweight | WIBA | 2000-2001 | 1 | |
| Carolina Rodriguez | 17-0 | Bantamweight | IBF | 2014-2015 | 3 | |
| Valerie Henin | 2-0-1 | Super Welterweight | WIBF | 1996 | 0 | |
| Bettina Csabi | 28-0-0 1 NC | Super flyweight Bantamweight | WIBF, GBU | 2004-2005 | 0 | |
| Bettina Csabi | 28-0-0 1 NC | Super flyweight Bantamweight | WIBF, GBU | 2004-2006 | 4 (WIBF) 5 (GBU) | |

== See also ==
- List of current world boxing champions
- List of current female world boxing champions
- Longest reigning heavyweight champions
