= Naomy Cárdenas =

Mexican boxer (born 1999)

Personal information
- Nickname: Kusa
- Born: Naomy Josefina Cárdenas Gómez; 16 July 1999 (age 27) Chihuahua City, Mexico
- Height: 5 ft 2 in (157 cm)
- Weight: Super-flyweight

Boxing career

Boxing record
- Total fights: 12
- Wins: 10
- Win by KO: 2
- Losses: 2

Naomy Cárdenas (born 16 July 1999) is a Mexican professional boxer. Having won the first nine fights of her career, she challenged unbeaten WBO female super-flyweight champion, Mizuki Hiruta, at Chumash Casino in Santa Ynez, California, USA on 15 August 2025. Cárdenas lost by unanimous decision with the judges' scoring the fight 100–90,100–90 and 98–92.
