= Mizuki Hiruta =

Japanese boxer (born 1996)

Mizuki Hiruta 晝田瑞希
Personal information
- Nickname: MIMI
- Nationality: Japan
- Born: 12 April 1996 (age 30) Okayama, Japan
- Height: 5 ft 4 in (163 cm)
- Weight: Flyweight; Super flyweight

Boxing career
- Reach: 66 1/2 in (169 cm)
- Stance: Southpaw

Boxing record
- Total fights: 11
- Wins: 11
- Win by KO: 2

Mizuki Hiruta (Japanese: 晝田瑞希, Hiruta Mizuki; born 12 April 1996) is a Japanese professional boxer. She has held the World Boxing Organization (WBO) super flyweight title since 2022, and the Ring magazine super flyweight title since 2025. At regional level, she held the Japanese flyweight title in 2022.

In 2025, she was named The Ring magazine Female Fighter of the Year.

== Amateur career ==
Hiruta took up boxing while attending the Okayama Technical High School and continued to train while at the JSDF Physical Training School. Hiruta was able to reach the finals of the 2016 All Japan Women's Championships, competing in the flyweight event, but was defeated by the 2014 World Championships bronze medalist Madoka Wada in the final bout of the tournament. Hiruta participated in the next year's All Japan Women's Championship as well and although she was able to reach the finals for the second consecutive year, she once again suffered a loss at the hands on Madoka Wada.

Hiruta won the gold medal in the flyweight event of the 2018 All Japan Women's Championships and in the featherweight event of the 2019 All Japan Women's Championships. She furthermore competed at the 2018 World Championships, but lost in the opening round of the tournament. Hiruta ended her amateur career with a record of 29–16, with 13 victories coming by way of stoppage.

== Professional career ==
=== Early career ===
Hiruta was discharged from the JSDF in March 2021 and acquired her B-class professional boxing license from the Japanese Boxing Commission in May 2021. Hiruta made her professional boxing debut against the undefeated 4–0 Nanae Yamaka on 15 October 2021. She won the fight by unanimous decision, with all three judges awarding her all six rounds of the bout. Hiruta scored the sole knockdown of the fight in the opening round, as she floored her opponent with a right hook.

Hiruta faced the three-time world title challenger Terumi Nuki on 12 April 2022, in what was the first eight-round bout of her career. She won the fight by unanimous decision, with two scorecards of 77–73 and one scorecard of 76–74. Hiruta was awarded rounds one through six, but suffered two knockdowns in the seventh round, which led to her losing the eighth round as well.

Hiruta, who was at the time the top ranked flyweight contender according to the Japanese Boxing Commission, was booked to face the third-ranked contender Hinami Yanai for the vacant Japanese flyweight championship. The title bout was scheduled for the undercard of "Queen's Crest 2022", which took place at the Korakuen Hall in Tokyo, Japan on 1 September 2022. Yanai weighed-in at 52. 1 kg at the official weigh-ins, 1.3 kg above the limit. She failed to make weight in her second attempt as well, coming in at 51.4 kg. This made her ineligible to capture the vacant belt. Hiruta won the fight by unanimous decision, with all three judges scoring the bout 60–54 in her favor. Following this victory, the East Japan Boxing Association awarded her the "New Star" award for the month of September.

=== WBO super flyweight champion ===
==== Hiruta vs. Taniyama ====
On 2 November 2022, a press conference was held, attended by Hiruta and the Japanese bantamweight champion Kanako Taniyama. At this press conference, it was revealed that the pair would face each other for the vacant WBO junior bantamweight championship. The title bout was scheduled as the main event of Victoriva.7, which took place at the Korakuen Hall in Tokyo, Japan on 1 December 2022 and was broadcast by BOXING RAISE. Hiruta won the fight by a dominant unanimous decision, with two judges scoring the bout 100–89 in her favor, while the third judge awarded her a 99–90 scorecard. On 8 February 2023, she was named the 2022 "Female Fighter of the Year" by a Japanese media members vote.

==== Title reign ====
Hiruta made her maiden WBO championship defense against Casey Morton on 13 June 2023, at the Korakuen Hall in Tokyo, Japan. She won the fight by a first-round knockout, only 63 seconds into the bout, after thrice knocking her opponent down.

On 12 January 2024 at Korakuen Hall, Hiruta won her second defense by technical knockout against Ji Hyun Park.

Hiruta made her third WBO championship defense against Maribel Ramírez at Commerce Casino in Commerce, California, USA, on 17 January 2025. She won the fight by an eighth-round unanimous TD, after Ramírez had been cut from an accidental head clash.

Again at Commerce Casino, she defeated Carla Merino by unanimous decision to retain her title for a fourth time on 17 May 2025.

Hiruta defended her title against Naomy Cárdenas at Chumash Casino in Santa Ynez, California, USA on 15 August 2025. She won by unanimous decision with the judges' scoring the fight 100–90,100–90 and 98–92.

On 22 November 2025, Hiruta defeated Gloria Gallardo by unanimous decision at Thunder Studios, Long Beach, California, to retain her title for the sixth time.

She made a seventh successful defense with a unanimous decision win over Mai Soliman at the Pyramids of Giza in Egypt on 23 May 2026.

On 5 November 2026, it was announced that Hiruta had signed with Most Valuable Promotions (MVP).

== Professional boxing record ==
11 fights	11 wins	0 losses
By knockout	2	0
By decision	9	0

No.	Result	Record	Opponent	Type	Round, time	Date	Location	Notes
11	Win	11–0	Mai Soliman	UD	10	23 May 2026	Pyramids of Giza, Egypt	Retained WBO and The Ring female super-flyweight titles
10	Win	10–0	Gloria Gallardo	UD	10	22 Nov 2025	Thunder Studios, Long Beach, California, U.S.	Retained WBO and The Ring female super-flyweight titles
9	Win	9–0	Naomy Cárdenas	UD	10	15 Aug 2025	Chumash Casino, Santa Ynez, California, U.S.	Retained WBO and The Ring female super-flyweight titles
8	Win	8–0	Carla Merino	UD	10	17 May 2025	Commerce Casino, Commerce, California, U.S.	Retained WBO female super-flyweight title; Won inaugural The Ring female super-flyweight title
7	Win	7–0	Maribel Ramírez	TD	8 (10), 0:42	17 Jan 2025	Commerce Casino, Commerce, California, U.S.	Retained WBO female super-flyweight title Unanimous TD: Ramírez was cut from an accidental head clash
6	Win	6–0	Ji Hyun Park	TKO	6 (10), 1:45	12 Jan 2024	Korakuen Hall, Tokyo, Japan	Retained WBO female super-flyweight title
5	Win	5–0	Casey Morton	TKO	1 (10), 1:03	13 Jun 2023	Korakuen Hall, Tokyo, Japan	Retained WBO female super-flyweight title
4	Win	4–0	Kanako Taniyama	UD	10	1 Dec 2022	Korakuen Hall, Tokyo, Japan	Won WBO female super-flyweight title
3	Win	3–0	Hinami Yanai	UD	6	1 Sep 2022	Korakuen Hall, Tokyo, Japan	Won Japanese female flyweight title
2	Win	2–0	Terumi Nuki	UD	8	12 Apr 2022	Korakuen Hall, Tokyo, Japan	
1	Win	1–0	Nanae Yamaka	UD	6	15 Oct 2021	Korakuen Hall, Tokyo, Japan	

== See also ==
- List of female boxers
- List of southpaw stance boxers
- Boxing in Japan
- List of Japanese boxing world champions

Sporting positions
Regional boxing titles
Vacant Title last held by Yume Hirayama	Japanese flyweight champion September 1, 2022 – December 1, 2022; Won world title	Vacant Title next held by Nanae Yamaka
World boxing titles
Vacant Title last held by Tamao Ozawa	WBO super-flyweight champion December 1, 2022 – present	Incumbent
Inaugural champion	The Ring super-flyweight champion May 17, 2025 – present	Incumbent
