= Linn Sandström =

Swedish-Brazilian-Australian boxer (born 1991)

Personal information
- Nationality: Swedish-Australian
- Born: 8 November 1991 (age 34) Brazil
- Height: 5 ft 3 in (160 cm)
- Weight: Super-flyweight, Flyweight

Boxing career
- Reach: 63 in (160 cm)
- Stance: Orthodox

Boxing record
- Total fights: 21
- Wins: 13
- Win by KO: 2
- Losses: 4
- Draws: 4

Linn Sandström (born 8 November 1991) is a Brazilian-born Swedish-Australian professional boxer. She has held the WBA interim female flyweight title since September 2026. Sandström has also twice challenged for the WBA female super-flyweight title.

== Early and personal life ==
Sandström was born in Brazil, but grew up in Sweden after being adopted when she was seven weeks old. She played table tennis at an international level and has a degree in marketing.

In 2016 Sandström moved to Australia, where she joined Bondi Boxing Club in an effort to improve her fitness and lose weight.

Away from the boxing ring, she works as a professional model with Adidas among the brands she has done photoshoots for.

== Boxing career ==
Sandström made her professional boxing debut on 26 August 2020, losing on points over four rounds to fellow debutante Jessica Cashman.

In her ninth paid fight, she defeated Khwunchit Khunya by unanimous decision in the Philippines on 7 August 2022, to claim the vacant WBA female Asia super-flyweight title.

Sandström added the WBA female Intercontinental super-flyweight title to her collection in her next outing, beating Sara Marjanovic via unanimous decision for the vacant championship at York Hall in London, England, on 29 October 2022.

She challenged undefeated WBA female super-flyweight champion Clara Lescurat at Hordern Pavilion in Sydney, Australia, on 24 April 2024, losing by unanimous decision.

Sandström defeated Carla Camila Campos Gonzales by unanimous decision for the vacant WBA female International super-flyweight title at Jacy'z Hotel in Gothenburg, Sweden, on 12 October 2024.

Returning to the Hordern Pavilion on 12 March 2025, she won the vacant WBA female Gold and IBF female International super-flyweight titles with a unanimous decision success over Yoselin Fernandez.

Sandström got a second chance at winning a world title when she challenged WBA female super-flyweight champion Jasmine Artiga at the Caribe Royale Resort in Orlando, Florida, USA, on 23 August 2025. She lost by stoppage in the third round.

In her next outing, Sandström switched to flyweight and returned to winning ways by defeating Kanokwan Wirunpat via unanimous decision over 10 rounds at the Q Room in Thomastown, Victoria, Australia, on 3 October 2025.

She defeated Maribel Ramírez by majority decision to claim the vacant WBA female Gold flyweight title at Kristianstad Arena in Kristianstad, Sweden, on 22 November 2025. Two of the ringside judges scored the fight 97–93 and 96–94 respectively in her favour, while the third had it a 95–95 draw.

Sandström fought Katherine Lindenmuth for the vacant WBA interim female flyweight title at Brondby Hallen in Brøndby, Denmark, on 16 May 2026. The fight ended in a majority draw with one judge awarding it to her opponent 98–92 but the other two scoring it 95–95.

On 2 September 2026, Sandström faced Ruqsana Begum at the William Inglis Hotel in Warwick Farm, New South Wales, Australia, with the still vacant WBA interim female flyweight title once again on the line. She won by unanimous decision.
