= Zulina Muñoz =

Mexican boxer (born 1987)

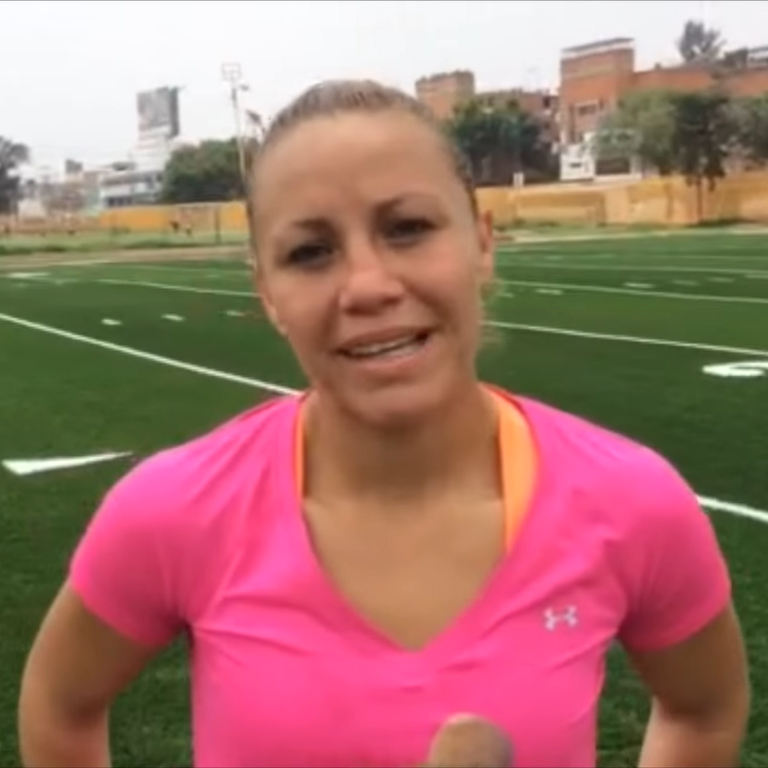

Personal information
- Nickname: La Tigresa (The Tigress)
- Born: Zulina Guadalupe Muñoz Grajeda; 10 August 1987 (age 38) Chicoloapan de Juárez, Mexico
- Height: 5 ft 3 in (160 cm)
- Weight: Super flyweight; Bantamweight

Boxing career
- Reach: 62 in (157 cm)
- Stance: Orthodox

Boxing record
- Total fights: 61
- Wins: 54
- Win by KO: 30
- Losses: 5
- Draws: 2

Zulina Guadalupe Muñoz Grajeda (born 10 August 1987) is a Mexican professional boxer. She held the WBC female super flyweight title from 2012 to 2017 and challenged for the WBC female bantamweight title in 2008. At regional level she held the WBC-NABF female bantamweight title from 2006 to 2007.

== Professional boxing record ==
61 fights	54 wins	5 losses
By knockout	30	2
By decision	23	3
By disqualification	1	0
Draws	2	

No.	Result	Record	Opponent	Type	Round, time	Date	Location	Notes
61	Win	54–5–2	(Mexico) Alondra Prado Nava	UD	8	24 Sep 2023	Mexico City, Distrito Federal, Mexico	
60	Loss	53–5–2	(Zimbabwe) Kudakwashe Chiwandire	UD	10	15 Oct 2022	Harare International Conference Center, Harare, Zimbabwe	
59	Loss	53–4–2	(Denmark) Dina Thorslund	KO	7 (10), 1:14	13 Nov 2021	Sydbank Arena, Kolding, Denmark	For WBO female bantamweight title
58	Win	53–3–2	(Mexico) Isis Vargas Perez	SD	8	15 May 2021	Arena San Juan de Pantitlan, Ciudad Nezahualcóyotl, Mexico	
57	Win	52–3–2	(Mexico) Valeria Pérez	KO	2 (10), 1:33	8 Mar 2020	Deportivo Leandro Valle, Mexico City, Mexico	
56	Win	51–3–2	(Mexico) Fredee Gonzalez	UD	8	15 Dec 2019	Deportivo Leandro Valle, Mexico City, Mexico	
55	Win	50–3–2	(Mexico) Sandra Hernández	UD	10	29 Sep 2019	Deportivo Leandro Valle, Mexico City, Mexico	
54	Loss	49–3–2	(Mexico) Mayeli Flores	KO	5 (10), 0:33	27 Apr 2019	La Feria de San Marcos, Aguascalientes City, Mexico	
53	Win	49–2–2	(Mexico) Arely Valente	TKO	5 (10), 2:00	12 Jan 2019	Deportivo Trabajadores del Metro, Mexico City, Mexico	
52	Loss	48–2–2	(Mexico) Guadalupe Martínez Guzmán	UD	10	13 May 2017	Grand Oasis Arena, Cancún, Mexico	Lost WBC female super flyweight title
51	Win	48–1–2	(Venezuela) Carolina Álvarez	UD	10	12 Nov 2016	Gimnasio Polifuncional Ana Gabriela Guevara, Hermosillo, Mexico	Retained WBC female super flyweight title
50	Win	47–1–2	(Argentina) Vanesa Lorena Taborda	KO	4 (10), 1:25	2 Jul 2016	Gimnasio Municipal "Jose Neri Santos", Ciudad Juárez, Mexico	Retained WBC female super flyweight title
49	Win	46–1–2	(Republic of Ireland) Christina McMahon	UD	10	12 Mar 2016	Gimnasio Municipal "Jose Neri Santos", Ciudad Juárez, Mexico	Retained WBC female super flyweight title
48	Win	45–1–2	(Uruguay) Gabriela Bouvier	UD	10	26 Sep 2015	Olympic Swimming Facilities, Mexico City, Mexico	Retained WBC female super flyweight title
47	Win	44–1–2	(Colombia) Olga Julio	UD	10	13 Dec 2014	Salón Las Palmas, Pesquería, Mexico	
46	Win	43–1–2	(Mexico) Karina Hernández Boiso	UD	10	27 Sep 2014	Hotel Gran Riviera Princess, Playa del Carmen, Mexico	
45	Win	42–1–2	(Hungary) Renáta Dömsödi	TKO	6 (10), 1:31	28 Jun 2014	Centro de Espectaculos, Epazoyucan, Mexico	Retained WBC female super flyweight title
44	Win	41–1–2	(Germany) Alesia Graf	TD	6 (10)	1 Mar 2014	World Trade Center Mexiquense, Naucalpan, Mexico	Retained WBC female super flyweight title
43	Win	40–1–2	(Argentina) Marisa Joana Portillo	DQ	8 (10), 1:23	30 Nov 2013	Deportivo Augustín Ramos Millan, Toluca, Mexico	Retained WBC female super flyweight title; Portillo disqualified for excessive holding
42	Win	39–1–2	(Mexico) Maribel Ramírez	KO	1 (10), 1:49	3 Aug 2013	Deportivo Augustín Ramos Millan, Toluca, Mexico	Retained WBC female super flyweight title
41	Win	38–1–2	(Uruguay) Soledad Macedo	TKO	4 (10), 1:16	25 May 2013	Domo de la Feria, León, Mexico	Retained WBC female super flyweight title
40	Win	37–1–2	(Japan) Tenkai Tsunami	UD	10	2 Mar 2013	Gimnasio de las Liebres, Río Bravo, Mexico	Retained WBC female super flyweight title
39	Win	36–1–2	(Mexico) Maribel Ramírez	UD	10	24 Nov 2012	Foro Polanco, Mexico City, Mexico	Won vacant WBC female super flyweight title
38	Win	35–1–2	(Uruguay) Gabriela Bouvier	TKO	9 (10), 1:59	29 Sep 2012	Auditorio del Bicentenario, Morelia, Mexico	Retained WBC Silver female bantamweight title
37	Win	34–1–2	(Mexico) Kandy Sandoval	UD	10	19 May 2012	Palenque de la Feria, Celaya, Mexico	Retained WBC Silver female bantamweight title
36	Win	33–1–2	(Colombia) Paulina Cardona	TKO	3 (10), 1:40	28 Jan 2012	Jose Cuervo Salon, Mexico City, Mexico	Retained WBC Silver female bantamweight title
35	Win	32–1–2	(Mexico) Fredee Gonzalez	UD	10	3 Dec 2011	Deportivo Morelos Pavon, Mexico City, Mexico	Retained WBC Silver female bantamweight title
34	Win	31–1–2	(Argentina) Verena Crespo	TKO	2 (10), 1:42	27 Aug 2011	Plaza de Toros, Huamantla, Mexico	Retained WBC Silver female bantamweight title
33	Win	30–1–2	(Mexico) Mariana Gonzalez	TKO	4 (10), 1:47	29 Jul 2011	Centro de Convenciones Mundo Nuevo, Matamoros, Mexico	
32	Win	29–1–2	(Mexico) Kandy Sandoval	UD	10	16 Jul 2011	Arena San Juan de Pantitlan, Ciudad Nezahualcóyotl, Mexico	Won inaugural WBC Silver female bantamweight title
31	Win	28–1–2	(Mexico) Estefania Franco	RTD	4 (10), 0:10	28 May 2011	Foro Scotiabank, Mexico City, Mexico	Retained WBC Youth female bantamweight title
30	Win	27–1–2	(Mexico) Judith Rodríguez	UD	10	25 Mar 2011	Jose Cuervo Salon, Mexico City, Mexico	Retained WBC Youth female bantamweight title
29	Win	26–1–2	(Mexico) Magdalena Leija	UD	10	14 Jan 2011	Deportivo Trabajadores del Metro, Mexico City, Mexico	Retained WBC Youth female bantamweight title
28	Win	25–1–2	(Mexico) Patricia Ordonez	TKO	1 (10), 1:34	18 Dec 2010	Palenque de la Feria, Celaya, Mexico	Retained WBC Youth female bantamweight title
27	Win	24–1–2	(Mexico) Magdalena Leija	TKO	7 (10), 0:39	28 Aug 2010	Modelo Museum of Science and Industry, Toluca, Mexico	Retained WBC Youth female bantamweight title
26	Draw	23–1–2	(Venezuela) Mayerlin Rivas	MD	10	9 Jul 2010	Gran Forúm, Mexico City, Mexico	Retained WBC Youth female bantamweight title
25	Win	23–1–1	(Mexico) Salma Canales	UD	10	15 May 2010	Deportivo Benito Juárez, Chicolapan de Juárez, Mexico	Retained WBC Youth female bantamweight title
24	Win	22–1–1	(Mexico) Yazmín Rivas	UD	10	27 Mar 2010	Deportivo Trabajadores del Metro, Mexico City, Mexico	Won inaugural WBC Youth female bantamweight title
23	Win	21–1–1	(Mexico) Yolanda Segura	TKO	1 (10), 1:50	19 Feb 2010	Centro de Convenciones El Hogar, Matamoros, Mexico	Won vacant Mexican female bantamweight title
22	Win	20–1–1	(Colombia) Paola Rojas	UD	8	18 Apr 2009	Gimnasio Alexis Argüello, Managua, Nicaragua	
21	Draw	19–1–1	(Bulgaria) Galina Ivanova	PTS	10	6 Sep 2008	Grand Hotel, Tijuana, Mexico	For WBC female bantamweight title
20	Win	19–1	(Mexico) Maria Elena Villalobos	UD	10	21 Jun 2008	Deportivo Benito Juárez, Chicoloapan de Juárez, Mexico	Won inaugural WBC International female bantamweight title
19	Win	18–1	(Mexico) Fredee Gonzalez	UD	10	11 Apr 2008	Arena Azteca Budokan, Ciudad Nezahualcóyotl, Mexico	
18	Win	17–1	(Mexico) Jessica Trejo	KO	3 (10)	23 Feb 2008	Auditorio de la Ciudad Deportiva, La Piedad, Mexico	
17	Loss	16–1	(Germany) Alesia Graf	UD	10	15 Sep 2007	Rostocker Stadthalle, Rostock, Germany	For GBU female super flyweight title
16	Win	16–0	(Mexico) San Juana Castaneda	TKO	2 (4)	13 Jul 2007	Auditorio Centenario, Gómez Palacio, Mexico	
15	Win	15–0	(Mexico) Magdalena Leija	KO	7 (10)	29 Jun 2007	Deportivo Tlalli, Tlalnepantla de Baz, Mexico	Retained WBC-NABF female bantamweight title
14	Win	14–0	(Mexico) Jessica Trejo	KO	4 (8)	21 Apr 2007	Arena Azteca Budokan, Ciudad Nezahualcóyotl, Mexico	
13	Win	13–0	(Mexico) Iraseme de la Fuente	TKO	4 (8), 1:50	3 Feb 2007	Estadio Carlos Serdan, Veracruz, Mexico	
12	Win	12–0	(Canada) Kristina Koderre	KO	1 (4)	22 Dec 2006	Arena Azteca Budokan, Ciudad Nezahualcóyotl, Mexico	
11	Win	11–0	(Mexico) Jessica Trejo	KO	1 (8)	28 Oct 2006	Arena Azteca Budokan, Ciudad Nezahualcóyotl, Mexico	
10	Win	10–0	(Mexico) Fredee Gonzalez	TKO	7 (10), 0:19	2 Sep 2006	Acapulco, Mexico	Retained WBC-NABF female bantamweight title
9	Win	9–0	(Mexico) Martha Leticia Arevalo	TKO	1 (10), 1:20	15 Jul 2006	Explanada Mercado Benito Juarez, Toluca, Mexico	Retained WBC-NABF female bantamweight title
8	Win	8–0	(Mexico) Fredee Gonzalez	UD	10	26 May 2006	Auditorio Enrique Batiz, Cuautitlán Izcalli, Mexico	Retained WBC-NABF female bantamweight title
7	Win	7–0	(Mexico) Magdalena Leija	TKO	2 (10), 0:54	28 Apr 2006	Arena Neza, Ciudad Nezahualcóyotl, Mexico	Won inaugural WBC-NABF female bantamweight title
6	Win	6–0	(Mexico) Beatriz Martinez	KO	1 (8)	18 Mar 2006	Expo Deporte, Toluca, Mexico	
5	Win	5–0	(Mexico) Patricia Contreras	KO	1 (8), 0:24	11 Feb 2006	Arena Azteca Budokan, Ciudad Nezahualcóyotl, Mexico	
4	Win	4–0	(Mexico) Sandra Hernández	TKO	2 (6)	19 Dec 2005	Crown Plaza, Tlalnepantla de Baz, Mexico	
3	Win	3–0	(Mexico) Guadalupe Marroquin	KO	1 (6)	10 Dec 2005	Salon Roja, Toluca, Mexico	
2	Win	2–0	(Mexico) Guadalupe Marroquin	TKO	2 (6)	19 Nov 2005	Arena Azteca Budokan, Ciudad Nezahualcóyotl, Mexico	
1	Win	1–0	(Mexico) Miriam Serrano	KO	1 (4)	11 Mar 2005	Salon Super Estrella, Ciudad Nezahualcóyotl, Mexico	

Sporting positions
Regional boxing titles
Inaugural champion	WBC-NABF female bantamweight champion 28 April 2006 – August 2007	Vacant Title next held by Rosalinda Rodriguez
Inaugural champion	WBC International female bantamweight champion 21 June 2008 – August 2008; Vacated	Vacant Title next held by Susie Ramadan
Vacant Title last held by Esmeralda Moreno	Mexican female bantamweight champion 19 February 2010 – March 2010; Vacated	Vacant Title next held by Karina Fernández
Inaugural champion	WBC Youth female bantamweight champion 27 March 2010 – June 2011; Vacated	Vacant Title next held by Alexandra Lazar
Inaugural champion	WBC Silver female bantamweight champion 16 July 2011 – August 2012; Vacated	Vacant Title next held by Usanakorn Kokietgym
Vacant Title last held by Eva Naranjo	WBC International female bantamweight champion 8 March 2020 – present	Incumbent
World boxing titles
Vacant Title last held by Ana María Torres	WBC female super flyweight champion 24 November 2012 – 13 May 2017	Succeeded by Guadalupe Martínez Guzmán
