= Malvina (disambiguation) =

Malvina is a feminine given name derived from the Gaelic, invented by the Scottish poet James Macpherson.

Malvina may also refer to:

- Malvina, Mississippi
- Malvina, an opera by Nicola Vaccai
- Malvina, A shipwreck off the Yorkshire coast

== See also ==
- Gran Malvina, Spanish name for the island West Falkland
- Malvinas (disambiguation)
- Malvinas Argentinas (disambiguation)
- Falkland (disambiguation)
