= Folkland =

Folkland may refer to:

- Folkland (Swedish provinces), the original Swedish provinces of Tiundaland, Attundaland, Fjärdhundraland, and Roden (Roslagen) which in 1296 united to form the modern province of Uppland
- A type of land tenure under Anglo-Saxon law: see bookland (law)

== See also ==
- Falkland (disambiguation)
- Falklands
