= Emanuela Pantani =

Italian boxer (born 1971)

Personal information
- Born: April 19, 1971 (age 55) Grosseto, Italy
- Height: 5 ft 5 1/2 in (166 cm)
- Weight: Bantamweight; Super bantamweight

Boxing career
- Stance: Orthodox

Boxing record
- Total fights: 10
- Wins: 10
- Win by KO: 2

Emanuela Pantani (born April 19, 1971) is an Italian former professional boxer.

== Professional career ==
Garcia turned professional in 2010 and compiled a record of 8–0 before facing & defeating Betina Gabriela Garino, to win the WBA bantamweight title.

== Professional boxing record ==
10 fights	10 wins	0 losses
By knockout	2	0
By decision	8	0

No.	Result	Record	Opponent	Type	Round, time	Date	Location	Notes
10	Win	10–0	Floarea Lihet	TD	4 (6)	2009-12-12	Palasport di Via Austria, Grosseto, Italy	
9	Win	9–0	Betina Gabriela Garino	UD	10	2008-12-19	Palasport di Via Austria, Grosseto, Italy	Won vacant WBA bantamweight title
8	Win	8–0	Galina Gyumliyska	PTS	6	2008-04-24	Palasport, Cecina, Italy	
7	Win	7–0	Elena Miftode	TKO	4 (10)	2007-11-27	Palasport di Via Austria, Grosseto, Italy	Won vacant European super-bantamweight title
6	Win	6–0	Suzana Radovanovic	PTS	6	2007-07-27	Stadio Comunale, San Paolo di Civitate, Italy	
5	Win	5–0	Mariann Pampuk	PTS	6	2007-03-30	Villafranca in Lunigiana, Italy	
4	Win	4–0	Jovana Neskovic	TKO	2 (6)	2006-12-26	Grosseto, Italy	
3	Win	3–0	Gabriella Rozsa	PTS	4	2006-07-15	Piazza Municipale, Sequals, Italy	
2	Win	2–0	Alena Kokavcova	PTS	4	2006-05-26	Palasport, Grosseto, Italy	
1	Win	1–0	Kata Satorhegyi	PTS	4	2006-03-17	Palasport, Grosseto, Italy	

== See also ==
- List of female boxers
- List of undefeated world boxing champions

Sporting positions
Regional boxing titles
New title	European super-bantamweight champion November 27, 2007 – December 19, 2008; Won world title	Vacant Title next held by Karine Rinaldo
World boxing titles
Vacant Title last held by Galina Ivanova	WBA bantamweight champion December 19, 2008 – 2010; Retired	Vacant Title next held by Janeth Pérez
