= Maribel Ramírez =

Mexican boxer (born 1986)

Personal information
- Nickname: Pantera
- Nationality: Mexican
- Born: Maribel Ramírez de Jesús; 28 June 1986 (age 40)
- Weight: Light flyweight; Flyweight; Super flyweight; Bantamweight

Boxing career

Boxing record
- Total fights: 32
- Wins: 15
- Win by KO: 3
- Losses: 13
- Draws: 4

Maribel Ramírez (born Maribel Ramírez de Jesús on 28 June 1986) is a Mexican professional boxer. She is a former WBA female super flyweight World title holder.

== Early life ==
Maribel Ramírez de Jesús was born on 28 June 1986. She made her boxing debut in July 2009, achieving a win by TKO over Tanzet Ramirez. Her boxing nickname is "Pantera," which is Spanish for "Panther."

== Professional career ==
With a record of six wins and a draw from her first seven fights, in November 2010 Ramírez faced Mariana Juárez for the interim World Boxing Council World Female Flyweight Title, losing by knockout. Following this she achieved a points victory over Guadalupe Bautista in February 2011, before losing to Esmeralda Moreno for the World Boxing Council Silver Female Light Fly Title in November 2011. Her next three fights saw mixed results – a loss, a win, and a draw.

In November 2012, Ramírez was a late replacement for Shondel Alfred to fight Zulina Muñoz for the vacant WBC female super flyweight title, after Alfred was found to be pregnant. Munoz won by unanimous decision, with all three judges scoring the contest 96–94 in her favour. Ramírez lost again to Munoz for the title in August 2013, being knocked out in the first round.

After a defeat of Esmeralda Moreno in February 2014, Ramírez lost three successive fights for the interim World Boxing Association World Female Light Fly Title, against Linda Laura Lecca in November 2014, Joselyn Arroyo Ruiz in March 2015, and Dayana Cordero in May 2016.

Ramírez became WBA female super flyweight world champion by defeating Lecca by majority decision in May 2018. She made a successful defence against former world champion Aniya Seki in October 2018. Ramírez lost her title to Clara Lescurat going down by split decision in Buenos Aires, Argentina, on 24 June 2022.

She challenged WNO female super-flyweight champion, Mizuki Hiruta, at Commerce Casino in Commerce, California, USA, on 17 January 2025. Ramírez lost by unanimous technical decision, after the fight was stopped in the eighth round due to a cut she sustained in an accidental clash of heads.

On 22 November 2025, she faced Linn Sandström for the vacant WBA female Gold flyweight title at Kristianstad Arena in Kristianstad, Sweden, losing by majority decision with two of the ringside judges scoring the fight 97–93 and 96–94 respectively for her opponent, while the third had it a 95–95 draw.
