= Carolina Rodríguez (boxer) =

Chilean boxer

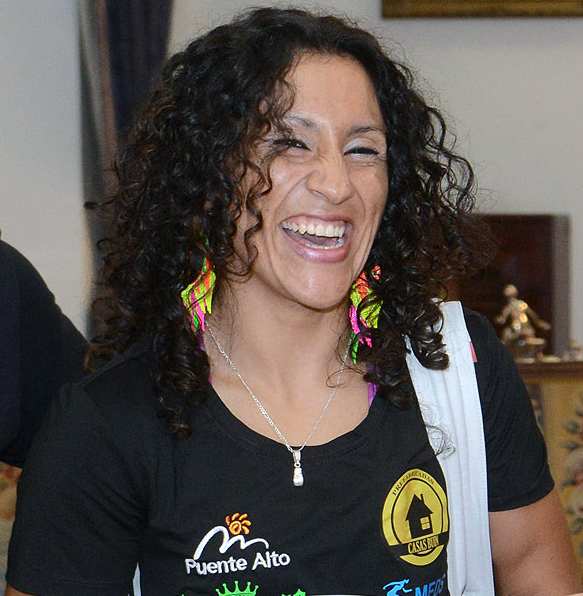

Personal information
- Nickname: La Crespa
- Born: Carolina Rodríguez Solorza; 30 September 1983 (age 42) Santiago, Chile
- Weight: Bantamweight

Boxing career
- Stance: Orthodox

Boxing record
- Total fights: 17
- Wins: 17
- Win by KO: 1

Carolina Rodríguez Solorza (born September 30, 1983) is a Chilean former professional boxer.

== Professional career ==
Rodríguez turned professional in 2016 and compiled a record of 11–0 before defeating Janeth Perez to win the IBF bantamweight title. She defended the title three times including against Japanese contender Tenkai Tsunami She vacated her title in 2017 due to pregnancy.

== Professional boxing record ==
17 fights	17 wins	0 losses
By knockout	1	0
By decision	16	0

No.	Result	Record	Opponent	Type	Round, time	Date	Location	Notes
17	Win	17–0	Natalia Josefina Alderete	UD	6 (6)	2024-12-06	Polideportivo Estadio Nacional, Santiago, Chile	
16	Win	16–0	Carolina Alvarez	UD	8 (8)	2018-03-23	Gran Arena Monticello, San Francisco de Mostazal, Chile	
15	Win	15–0	Tenkai Tsunami	UD	10 (10)	2015-08-22	Gimnasio Sokol, Antofagasta, Chile	Retained IBF bantamweight title
14	Win	14–0	Janeth Perez	MD	10 (10)	2014-12-12	Arena de Puente Alto, Puente Alto, Chile	Retained IBF bantamweight title
13	Win	13–0	Dayana Cordero	SD	10 (10)	2014-08-09	Polideportivo Estadio Nacional, Santiago, Chile	Retained IBF bantamweight title
12	Win	12–0	Janeth Perez	MD	10 (10)	2014-05-10	Arena Solidaridad, Monterrey, Mexico	Won IBF bantamweight title
11	Win	11–0	Simone Aparecida da Silva	UD	10 (10)	2014-01-18	Gimnasio Enrique Donn Muller, Constitución, Chile	Retained WIBA bantamweight title
10	Win	10–0	Natalia Vanesa Lopez	TKO	5 (8)	2013-11-01	Gimnasio Municipal, Puente Alto, Chile	
9	Win	9–0	Ana Maria Lozano	UD	10 (10)	2013-08-31	Estadio Enrique Donn Muller, Constitución, Chile	Won vacant WIBA bantamweight title
8	Win	8–0	Florencia Roxana Canteros	UD	8 (8)	2013-07-26	Club Social, Alejandro Korn, Argentina	
7	Win	7–0	Daiane Ribeiro	UD	8 (8)	2013-02-22	Gimnasio CEO, Santiago, Chile	
6	Win	6–0	Anahi Yolanda Salles	UD	6 (6)	2012-11-16	Auditorio Presidente Néstor Kirchner, Tapiales, Argentina	
5	Win	5–0	Alejandra Soledad Morales	UD	6 (6)	2012-10-26	Tecnópolis, Villa Martelli, Argentina	
4	Win	4–0	Alejandra Soledad Morales	MD	4 (4)	2012-10-05	Auditorio Presidente Néstor Kirchner, Tapiales, Argentina	
3	Win	3–0	Betina Gabriela Garino	UD	4 (4)	2012-02-10	Gimnasio Club Mexico, Santiago, Chile	
2	Win	2–0	María Cecilia Román	UD	6 (6)	2011-08-20	Gimnasio Club Mexico, Santiago, Chile	
1	Win	1–0	Natalia del Pilar Burga	UD	4 (4)	2010-04-30	Gimnasio Club Mexico, Santiago, Chile	

== See also ==
- List of female boxers
- List of undefeated world boxing champions

Sporting positions
Minor world boxing titles
Vacant Title last held by Shondell Alfred	WIBA bantamweight champion August 31, 2013 – 2014; Vacated	Vacant Title next held by Tyrieshia Douglas
World boxing titles
Preceded by Janeth Perez	IBF bantamweight champion May 10, 2014 – 2017; Vacated	Vacant Title next held by María Cecilia Román
