= Falkland =

Falkland may refer to:

- Falkland, British Columbia, a community in Canada
- Falkland, Nova Scotia, a community in Canada
- Falkland Islands, an archipelago in the south Atlantic Ocean
  - Falklands Crisis of 1770
  - Falklands War of 1982
- Falkland, Fife, a former burgh in Fife, Scotland
  - Falkland Palace, royal residence of the Kings of Scots in Falkland, Fife, Scotland
  - Viscount Falkland, a Scottish peerage title, named after Falkland, Fife, Scotland
- Falkland, North Carolina, a town in the United States
- Falkland (Redd Shop, Virginia), U.S., a historic plantation house
- Falkland (novel), an 1827 novel by Edward Bulwer-Lytton

== See also ==
- Falkland Ridge, Nova Scotia, a community in Canada
- Falkland Sound, a strait separating West Falkland and East Falkland
- South Falkland, an English colony on Newfoundland
- Folkland (disambiguation)
- Malvinas (disambiguation)
- Malvina (disambiguation)
