= Tenkai Tsunami =

Japanese boxer (born 1984)

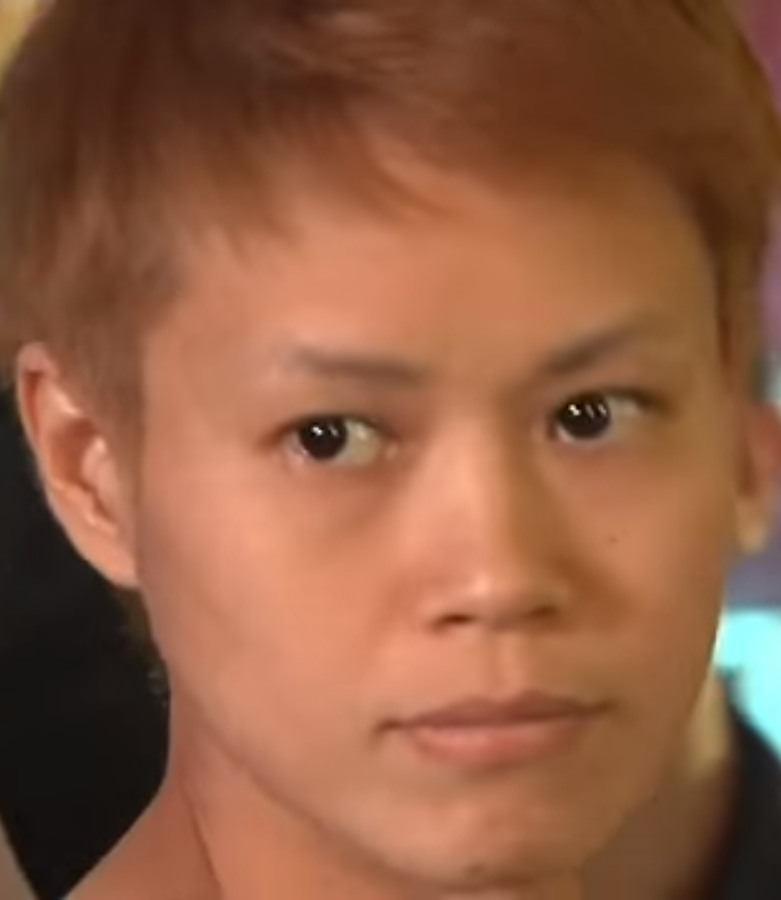
- Tenkai Tsunami

Personal information
- Nationality: Japanese
- Born: Manami Arima; 13 August 1984 (age 42) Uruma, Okinawa Prefecture, Japan
- Height: 5 ft 2 in (157 cm)
- Weight: Mini-flyweight; Light-flyweight; Flyweight; Super-flyweight; Bantamweight

Boxing career
- Stance: Orthodox

Boxing record
- Total fights: 46
- Wins: 32
- Win by KO: 19
- Losses: 13
- Draws: 1

Manami Arima (有馬真波, Arima Manami; born 13 August 1984), better known as Tenkai Tsunami, is a Japanese professional boxer. She is a world champion in two weight classes, having held the WBO female junior-flyweight title from 2018 to July 2021 and previously the WBA female super-flyweight title from 2009 to 2012. She also held the challenged for the WBA female bantamweight title in 2012; the WBC female super-flyweight title in 2013; and the IBF female bantamweight title in 2015. As of September 2020, she is ranked as the world's third best active female junior-flyweight by The Ring and fifth by BoxRec.

== Professional career ==
Tsunami made her professional debut on 12 June 2005, scoring a third-round technical knockout (TKO) victory against Maki Ochiai at the Kitazawa Town Hall in Tokyo, Japan.

After compiling a record of 3–1 (1 KO), she challenged Ju Hee Kim for the IFBA junior-flyweight title on 22 April 2006 at Shingoo University in Seongnam, South Korea. Tsunami suffered the second defeat of her career, losing by unanimous decision (UD) over ten rounds.

After another eight fights–seven wins with three by stoppage–she defeated Eun Young Kim on 18 May 2008 at the Yangcheongu Hall in Seoul, South Korea, capturing the IFBA bantamweight title via UD with scores of 98–94, 96–94 and 97–96.

After retaining her title by majority decision (MD) against Young Kim in a rematch in August and a TKO victory against Soo-Hyun Oh in a non-title fight in November, Tsunami challenged WBA female super-flyweight champion, Zhang Xiyan, on 26 February 2009 at the Korakuen Hall in Tokyo. Tsunami won the bout by split decision (SD) to capture her first major world title. Two judges scored the bout in favour of Tsunami with 98–92 and 97–95, while the third scored it 96–95 to Zhang. After four successful defences, winning two by stoppage, she lost the title by UD against Naoko Yamaguchi on 9 July 2012 at the Korakuen Hall. Two judges scored the bout 97–93 and the third scored it 97–94.

Following defeat to Yamaguchi, she moved up in weight to challenge WBA female bantamweight champion, Janeth Perez, on 6 October 2012 at the Palenque de la Feria in Tepic, Mexico. Tsunami failed in her second attempt at a major world title, losing by UD. Two judges scored the bout 99–91 and the third scored it 100–90.

Following her fifth defeat she moved back down to super-flyweight, losing a ten-round UD to former world champion Mariana Juárez in December, before challenging WBC female super-flyweight champion, Zulina Muñoz, on 2 March 2013 at the Gimnasio de las Liebres in Río Bravo, Mexico. Tsunami failed in her third attempt at a world title, losing by UD with scores of 95–93 twice, and 97–92.

She suffered her fifth consecutive loss five months later against Jessica Chávez in September, before breaking the losing streak with a TKO win against Leslie Domingo in November. She lost again in her next fight against Arely Muciño in January 2014 before defeating Honey Mae Bermoy on 7 March at the Korakuen Hall, capturing the vacant OPBF female bantamweight title via seventh-round TKO.

After a loss in a rematch with Jessica Chávez the following month and a TKO win against Rathsada Sor Worasin in March 2015, she challenged IBF female bantamweight champion, Carolina Rodriguez, on 22 August 2015 at the Gimnasio Sokol in Antofagasta, Chile. In what was her third attempt to gain a second major world title, Tsunami lost by UD with scores of 98–92, 99–91 and 100–91.

She won three of her four following fights, all by stoppage, before facing Chaoz Minowa for the vacant WBO female junior-flyweight title on 8 March 2018 at the Korakuen Hall. Tsunami defeated Minowa by stoppage after she failed to come out of her corner for the ninth round, awarding Tsunami the WBO title via eighth-round corner retirement (RTD). At the time of the stoppage Tsunami was ahead on all three judges scorecards, with scores of 78–74 twice and 78–75. Following a successful defence of her newly acquired title, a TKO win over Gretchen Abaniel in July, she moved up in weight to challenge WBA female flyweight champion, Naoko Fujioka, on 12 July 2019 at the Korakuen Hall. Fujioka retained her title through a split draw, with one judge scoring the bout 96–94 in favour of Tsunami, another scoring it 95–94 to Fujioka while the third scored it even at 95–95.

== Professional boxing record ==
46 fights	32 wins	13 losses
By knockout	19	0
By decision	13	13
Draws	1	

No.	Result	Record	Opponent	Type	Round, time	Date	Location	Notes
46	Win	32–13–1	Siriporn Thaweesuk	UD	10	10 Jun 2024	Wat Pak Bo School, Bangkok, Thailand	Won vacant WBC Silver female mini-flyweight title
45	Win	31–13–1	Wassana Kamdee	TKO	2 (8), 1:10	4 Dec 2023	Korakuen Hall, Tokyo, Japan	
44	Win	30–13–1	Saowaluk Nareepangsri	TKO	3 (8), 0:40	21 Jun 2023	Korakuen Hall, Tokyo, Japan	
43	Win	29–13–1	Yumi Narita	TKO	10 (10), 1:50	9 Dec 2022	Korakuen Hall, Tokyo, Japan	
42	Loss	28–13–1	Seniesa Estrada	UD	10	9 Jul 2021	Banc of California Stadium, Los Angeles, California, U.S.	Lost WBO junior-flyweight title
41	Win	28–12–1	Shione Ogata	UD	10	4 Apr 2021	Sangyo Shinko Center, Sakai, Osaka, Japan	Retained WBO female junior-flyweight title
40	Win	27–12–1	Jessebelle Pagaduan	TKO	8 (10), 1:40	14 Dec 2019	Uchinoura Ginga Arena, Kimotsuki, Japan	Retained WBO female junior-flyweight title
39	Draw	26–12–1	Naoko Fujioka	SD	10	12 Jul 2019	Korakuen Hall, Tokyo, Japan	Retained WBO female junior-flyweight title
38	Win	26–12	Gretchen Abaniel	TKO	4 (10), 1:33	29 Jul 2018	Convention Center, Ginowan, Japan	Retained WBO female junior-flyweight title
37	Win	25–12	Chaoz Minowa	RTD	8 (10), 2:00	8 Mar 2018	Korakuen Hall, Tokyo, Japan	Won vacant WBO female junior-flyweight title
36	Win	24–12	Carleans Rivas	TKO	2 (8), 1:19	29 Nov 2017	Korakuen Hall, Tokyo, Japan	
35	Loss	23–12	Arely Muciño	UD	10	30 Sep 2017	Grand Oasis Arena, Cancún, Mexico	
34	Win	23–11	Sophita Nuetkrathok	TKO	2 (6), 1:43	2 Jul 2016	Yano Fitness Center, Zama, Japan	
33	Win	22–11	Emika Himuro	RTD	2 (8), 2:00	1 Mar 2016	Korakuen Hall, Tokyo, Japan	
32	Loss	21–11	Carolina Rodriguez	UD	10	22 Aug 2015	Gimnasio Sokol, Antofagasta, Chile	For IBF female bantamweight title
31	Win	21–10	Rathsada Sor Worasin	TKO	2 (8), 0:58	16 Mar 2015	Korakuen Hall, Tokyo, Japan	
30	Loss	20–10	Jessica Chávez	UD	10	28 Apr 2014	Foro Polanco, Mexico City, Mexico	
29	Win	20–9	Honey Mae Bermoy	TKO	7 (8), 1:41	7 Mar 2014	Korakuen Hall, Tokyo, Japan	Won vacant OPBF female bantamweight title
28	Loss	19–9	Arely Muciño	MD	10	25 Jan 2014	Arena Solidaridad, Monterrey, Mexico	
27	Win	19–8	Leslie Domingo	TKO	3 (8), 1:58	28 Nov 2013	Korakuen Hall, Tokyo, Japan	
26	Loss	18–8	Jessica Chávez	UD	10	27 Jul 2013	Palenque de la Fería, Chihuahua City, Mexico	
25	Loss	18–7	Zulina Muñoz	UD	10	2 Mar 2013	Gimnasio de las Liebres, Río Bravo, Mexico	For WBA female super-flyweight title
24	Loss	18–6	Mariana Juárez	UD	10	15 Dec 2012	Arena Coliseo, Guadalajara, Mexico	
23	Loss	18–5	Janeth Perez	UD	10	6 Oct 2012	Palenque de la Feria, Tepic, Mexico	For WBC female bantamweight title
22	Loss	18–4	Naoko Yamaguchi	UD	10	9 Jul 2012	Korakuen Hall, Tokyo, Japan	Lost WBA female super-flyweight title
21	Win	18–3	Nucharin Yoohanngoh	TKO	3 (10), 1:25	17 May 2011	Korakuen Hall, Tokyo, Japan	Retained WBA female super-flyweight title
20	Win	17–3	Rie Fujimoto	RTD	8 (10), 2:00	6 Dec 2010	Korakuen Hall, Tokyo, Japan	Retained WBA female super-flyweight title
19	Win	16–3	Kayoko Ebata	UD	10	17 May 2010	Saitama Super Arena, Saitama, Japan	
18	Win	15–3	Shanee Martin	UD	10	7 Feb 2010	World Memorial Hall, Kobe, Japan	Retained WBA female super-flyweight title
17	Win	14–3	Zhang Xiyan	SD	10	26 Feb 2009	Korakuen Hall, Tokyo, Japan	Won WBA female super-flyweight title
16	Win	13–3	Soo-Hyun Oh	TKO	5 (6), 0:58	30 Nov 2008	Convention Center, Ginowan, Japan	
15	Win	12–3	Eun Young Kim	MD	10	15 Aug 2008	Citizen Gymnasium, Daegu, South Korea	Retained IFBA bantamweight title
14	Win	11–3	Eun Young Kim	UD	10	18 May 2008	Yangcheongu Hall, Seoul, South Korea	Won IFBA bantamweight title
13	Win	10–3	Kazumi Izaki	UD	8	10 Nov 2007	Shinjuku FACE, Tokyo, Japan	Won JWBC flyweight title
12	Loss	9–3	Young Mi Jo	MD	8	13 Aug 2007	Yongsan Gu Park, Seoul, South Korea	
11	Win	9–2	Ayaka Miyao	KO	2 (8)	24 Jun 2007	Shinjuku FACE, Tokyo, Japan	
10	Win	8–2	Aya Tamaki	UD	4	13 May 2007	Okayama, Japan	
9	Win	7–2	Tomoko Koga	PTS	6	15 Apr 2007	Shinjuku FACE, Tokyo, Japan	
8	Win	6–2	Seri	TKO	1 (4)	15 Dec 2006	Tokyo, Japan	
7	Win	5–2	Tian Meng	UD	6	12 Oct 2006	Halla Gymnasium, Jeju City, South Korea	
6	Win	4–2	Bison Miho	KO	1 (4), 1:50	10 Jun 2006	Shinjuku FACE, Tokyo, Japan	
5	Loss	3–2	Ju Hee Kim	UD	10	22 Apr 2006	Shingoo University, Seongnam, South Korea	For IFBA junior-flyweight title
4	Win	3–1	Junko Kanbara	UD	4	20 Nov 2005	Okayama, Japan	
3	Win	2–1	Ji-Hyun Kim	SD	10	12 Nov 2005	Okcheon, South Korea	Won vacant OPFBA flyweight title
2	Loss	1–1	Junko Minagawa	PTS	4	1 Oct 2005	Roppongi Velfarre, Tokyo, Japan	
1	Win	1–0	Maki Ochiai	TKO	3 (4)	12 Jun 2005	Kitazawa Town Hall, Tokyo, Japan	
