= Apozol =

City in the Mexican state of Zacatecas

Apozol, Zacatecas
- City
- Location within Zacatecas Location within Mexico
- Coordinates: 21°28′N 103°05′W
- Country: Mexico
- State: Zacatecas
- Municipality: Apozol
- Founded: September 2, 1554

Government
  - Mayor: Gabriela Arellano Quezada
- Elevation: 1,300 m (4,300 ft)

Population (2005)
  - Total: 5,000
- Time zone: UTC-6 (Central (US Central))
- Postal code: 99940
- Area code: 467

Apozol is a city in the state of Zacatecas.
