= Arely Muciño =

Mexican boxer (born 1989)

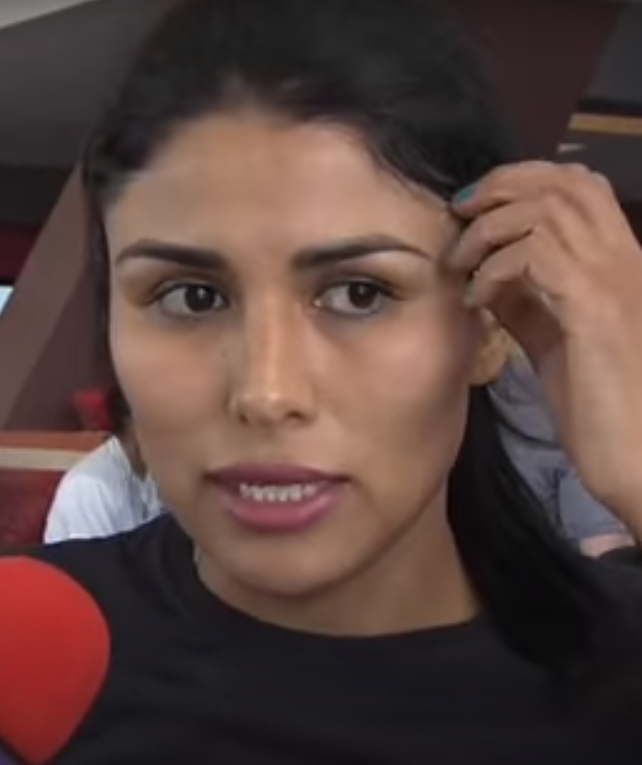

Personal information
- Nickname: Ametralladora
- Nationality: Mexican
- Born: Arely Abigaíl Muciño Reyes; 20 May 1989 (age 37) Monterrey, Nuevo León, Mexico
- Height: 160 cm (5 ft 3 in)
- Weight: Flyweight

Boxing career
- Reach: 163 cm (64 in)
- Stance: Orthodox

Boxing record
- Total fights: 39
- Wins: 32
- Win by KO: 11
- Losses: 5
- Draws: 2
- No contests: 1

Arely Abigaíl Muciño Reyes (Spanish pronunciation: [aˈɾeli muˈsiɲo]; born 20 May 1989) is a Mexican professional boxer who is a four-time former female flyweight World champion.

== Career ==
Muciño began boxing aged 13 and was initially coached by her father, Joseph Muciño Rameriz.

Having turned professional in 2008, Muciño won her first World title on 22 January 2011, defeating Chantel Cordova for the vacant IBF female flyweight belt when her opponent retired in round four of their fight at Arena Neza, Ciudad Nezahualcoyotl, Mexico.

In her third defense, she lost her title when she was knocked out by Ava Knight in round two at Palenque de la Feria, Colima, Mexico, on 29 October 2011.

Muciño won her second world title when she beat WBC female flyweight champion Shindo Go by unanimous decision on 6 December 2014, at Arena José Sulaimán, Monterrey, Mexico.

She lost the belt in her first defense on 19 September 2015, going down to a unanimous decision loss against Jessica Chávez at Emiliano Zapata Sports Center, Ecatepec de Morelos, Mexico.

Muciño became a three-time world female flyweight champion when she claimed the WBO title thanks to a majority decision win over Monserrat Alarcón at Domo del Parque San Rafael, Guadalajara, Mexico, on 17 February 2018.

After making two successful defences, she vacated the title before becoming IBF female flyweight World champion on 29 October 2022, by dethroning Argentina's Leonela Paola Yúdica by split decision at Pechanga Arena, San Diego, California, USA. Judge David Soliven scored the fight 96-94 for Yudica while judges Alejandro Rochin (96–94) and Zachary Young (97–93) were in favour of Muciño.

Muciño's reign lasted only one fight as in her next contest she suffered a fifth-round stoppage defeat to Gabriela Fundora at the Kia Forum, Inglewood, California, US, on 21 October 2023.
