= Linda Laura Lecca =

Peruvian boxer (born 1988)

Personal information
- Nicknames: La Princessa Inca (The Inca Princess); Triple L
- Born: 13 July 1988 (age 37) Trujillo, Peru
- Weight: Super-flyweight; Super-bantamweight; Featherweight

Boxing career
- Stance: Orthodox

Boxing record
- Total fights: 30
- Wins: 16
- Win by KO: 3
- Losses: 8
- Draws: 2
- No contests: 4

Linda Laura Lecca (born 13 July 1988) is a Peruvian professional boxer. She held the WBA female super flyweight title from 2016 to 2018 and challenged for the WBO female super flyweight title in 2014 and 2018.

== Professional career ==
Lecca made her professional debut on 5 June 2010, scoring a four-round split decision (SD) victory against Roxana Virginia Baron at the Estadio F.A.B. in Buenos Aires, Argentina.

After compiling a record of 3–1–1, she participated in the Mexican reality TV show Todas Contra México in 2011. She had three bouts on the show, winning the first two and losing the third against future world champion Yazmín Rivas. All three bouts are listed as no contests (NC) by record keeping website BoxRec due to the events not being officially sanctioned by Mexico's boxing commission.

Following the loss to Rivas, Lecca defeated Mayra Alejandra Gomez via ten-round unanimous decision (UD) on 14 April 2012, capturing the vacant South American female super bantamweight title at the Estadio Ruca Che in Neuquén, Argentina.

Two years later she faced Daniela Romina Bermúdez for the vacant WBO female super flyweight title on 4 January 2014, at the Piso de los Deportes in Mar del Plata, Argentina. Lecca suffered the second defeat of her career, losing via eighth-round technical knockout (TKO) in a scheduled ten-round bout.

Following her loss to Bermúdez, Lecca defeated Maria Vega via eight-round UD on 8 March 2014, capturing the vacant WBA Fedelatin female super bantamweight title at the Coliseo Dibos Dammert in Lima, Peru.

She next faced Simone da Silva for the vacant WBA interim female super flyweight title on 31 May 2014, at the Complejo Deportivo "El Chancherín" in Huarochirí, Peru. Lecca defeated Da Silva via UD over ten rounds. She made two successful defences, scoring UD victories against Guadalupe Martínez Guzmán and Maribel Ramírez in August and November, respectively, before making a third defence against Carolina Álvarez on 28 March 2015, at the Mega Plaza Norte in Lima. The bout was stopped in the second round and declared a NC after Lecca suffered a cut from an accidental clash of heads, with Lecca retaining her interim title. Lecca and Álvarez met in a rematch in June the following year, with the WBA female super flyweight title on the line after Lecca was elevated to full champion. Lecca retained her title through a split draw (SD), with one judge scoring the bout 98–92 in favour of Lecca, the second judge scoring it 100–90 for Álvarez while the third judge scored it 95–95. The event was recognised by Guinness World Records for having the most female world championship fights, with four world titles being contested on the night.

After retaining her title with a UD victory against Karina Fernández in August 2017, she faced former foe Maribel Ramírez on 19 May 2018, at the Plaza Mall Sur in Lima. Lecca suffered the third defeat of her career, losing her WBA title via majority decision (MD), with two judges scoring the bout 98–93 and 96–94 in favour of Ramírez, while the third judge scored it even with 95–95.

Following the loss of her title, Lecca challenged WBO female super flyweight champion Raja Amasheh on 14 September 2018, at Palazzohalle in Karlsruhe, Germany. With the honorary WBC Diamond title also on the line, Lecca suffered her second consecutive defeat, losing via UD. Two judges scored the bout 97–93 and the third scored it 100–90.

Lecca challenged WBO female super-bantamweight champion Yamileth Mercado in Tijuana, Baja California, Mexico, on 27 April 2024, losing by unanimous decision with the three ringside judges each awarding every round to the Mexican boxer.

== Professional boxing record ==
30 fights	16 wins	8 losses
By knockout	3	1
By decision	13	7
Draws	2	
No contests	4	

No.	Result	Record	Opponent	Type	Round, time	Date	Location	Notes
30	Loss	16–8–2 (4)	(Mexico) Yamileth Mercado	UD	10	27 Apr 2024	Tijuana, Baja California, Mexico	For WBC female super-bantamweight World title
29	Win	16–7–2 (4)	(Ecuador) Estefania Alvarado	UD	6	9 Dec 2023	Complejo Deportivo "El Cancherín", Huarochirí, Peru	
28	Loss	15–7–2 (4)	(Australia) Skye Nicolson	PTS	8	22 Apr 2023	(United Kingdom) Cardiff International Arena, Cardiff, Wales	
27	Loss	15–6–2 (4)	(United Kingdom) Raven Chapman	UD	10	25 Mar 2023	(United Kingdom) Telford International Centre, Telford, England	For WBC female featherweight International title
26	Loss	15–5–2 (4)	(Chile) Daniela Asenjo	UD	10	3 Dec 2022	Coliseo Municipal, Valdivia, Chile	For IBO female super flyweight World title
25	Win	15–4–2 (4)	(Ecuador) Rosibel Escobar	UD	6	27 Aug 2022	Complejo Deportivo "El Cancherín", Huarochirí, Peru	
24	Win	14–4–2 (4)	(Ecuador) Erika Cedeno	TD	5 (6)	2 Jul 2022	Complejo Deportivo "El Cancherín", Huarochirí, Peru	
23	Loss	13–4–2 (4)	(Germany) Raja Amasheh	UD	10	14 Sep 2018	Palazzohalle, Karlsruhe, Germany	For WBO female super flyweight title
22	Loss	13–3–2 (4)	(Mexico) Maribel Ramírez	MD	10	19 May 2018	Plaza Mall Sur, Lima, Peru	Lost WBA female super flyweight title
21	Win	13–2–2 (4)	(Mexico) Karina Fernández	UD	10	19 Aug 2017	Coliseo Gran Chimu, Trujillo, Peru	Retained WBA female super flyweight title
20	Draw	12–2–2 (4)	(Venezuela) Carolina Álvarez	SD	10	18 Jun 2016	Polideportivo José María Vargas, La Guaira, Venezuela	Retained WBA female super flyweight title
19	NC	12–2–1 (4)	(Venezuela) Carolina Álvarez	NC	2 (10)	28 Mar 2015	Mega Plaza Norte, Lima, Peru	Retained WBA interim female super flyweight title; Fight stopped after Lecca was cut from an accidental head clash
18	Win	12–2–1 (3)	(Mexico) Maribel Ramírez	UD	10	23 Nov 2014	Coliseo Cerrado, Ica, Peru	Retained WBA interim female super flyweight title
17	Win	11–2–1 (3)	(Mexico) Guadalupe Martínez Guzmán	UD	10	30 Aug 2014	Complejo Deportivo "El Chancherín", Huarochirí, Peru	Retained WBA interim female super flyweight title
16	Win	10–2–1 (3)	(Brazil) Simone Aparecida Da Silva	UD	10	31 May 2014	Complejo Deportivo "El Chancherín", Huarochirí, Peru	Won vacant WBA interim female super flyweight title
15	Win	9–2–1 (3)	(Colombia) Maria Vega	UD	8	8 Mar 2014	Coliseo Dibos Dammert, Lima, Peru	Won vacant WBA Fedelatin female super flyweight title
14	Loss	8–2–1 (3)	(Argentina) Daniela Romina Bermúdez	TKO	8 (10)	4 Jan 2014	Piso de los Deportes, Mar del Plata, Argentina	For vacant WBO female super flyweight title
13	Win	8–1–1 (3)	(Colombia) Vanesa Medrano	TKO	3 (6)	28 Sep 2013	Mega Plaza Norte, Lima, Peru	
12	Win	7–1–1 (3)	(Colombia) Lina Palmera	TKO	3 (6)	13 Jul 2013	Coliseo Miguel Grau, Callao, Peru	
11	Win	6–1–1 (3)	(Colombia) Gleydis Jimenez	TKO	2 (6), 1:30	25 May 2013	Coliseo Cerrado Mauro Mina, Chincha Alta, Peru	
10	Win	5–1–1 (3)	(Peru) Valeria Mejia	UD	4	16 Mar 2013	Coliseo Miguel Grau, Callao, Peru	
9	Win	4–1–1 (3)	(Argentina) Mayra Alejandra Gomez	UD	10	14 Apr 2012	Estadio Ruca Che, Neuquén, Argentina	Won vacant South American female super bantamweight title
8	NC	3–1–1 (3)	(Mexico) Yazmín Rivas	UD	6	9 Apr 2011	Poliforum Mezoamericano, Tuxtla Gutiérrez, Mexico	Unsanctioned bout on Todas Contra México reality TV show; Rivas declared winner by UD
7	NC	3–1–1 (2)	(Mexico) Cynthia Munoz	UD	6	2 Apr 2011	Poliforum Mezoamericano, Tuxtla Gutiérrez, Mexico	Unsanctioned bout on Todas Contra México reality TV show; Lecca declared winner by UD
6	NC	3–1–1 (1)	(Mexico) Karina Hernández Boiso	UD	6	26 Mar 2011	Poliforum Mezoamericano, Tuxtla Gutiérrez, Mexico	Unsanctioned bout on Todas Contra México reality TV show; Lecca declared winner by UD
5	Loss	3–1–1	(Argentina) Marisa Gabriela Nuñez	SD	4	29 Jan 2011	Polideportivo Municipal, Monte Hermoso, Argentina	
4	Draw	3–0–1	(Argentina) Marisa Gabriela Nuñez	SD	4	6 Nov 2010	Estadio F.A.B., Buenos Aires, Argentina	
3	Win	3–0	(Argentina) Natalia Vanesa Lopez	UD	4	17 Sep 2010	Ce.De.C No.1, San Fernando, Argentina	
2	Win	2–0	(Argentina) Veronica Orecchia	UD	4	14 Aug 2010	Club Deportivo Libertad, Sunchales, Argentina	
1	Win	1–0	(Argentina) Roxana Virginia Baron	SD	4	5 Jun 2010	Estadio F.A.B., Buenos Aires, Argentina	

Sporting positions
Regional boxing titles
Vacant Title last held by Carolina Duer	South American female super bantamweight champion 14 April 2012 – 2013	Vacant Title next held by Laura Soledad Griffa
World boxing titles
Preceded by Daniela Romina Bermúdez	WBA female super flyweight champion Interim title 31 May 2014 – 2015; Elevated to full champion	Vacant
Preceded by Naoko Fujioka	WBA female super flyweight champion 2015 – 19 May 2018	Succeeded by Maribel Ramírez
