= Clara Lescurat =

Argentine boxer (born 1988)

Personal information
- Born: 13 May 1988 (age 38) Buenos Aires, Argentina
- Height: 160 cm (5 ft 3 in)
- Weight: Super-flyweight

Boxing career
- Stance: Orthodox

Boxing record
- Total fights: 11
- Wins: 11
- Win by KO: 4

Clara Lescurat (born 13 May 1988) is an Argentine former professional boxer who held the WBA female super-flyweight title from 2022 to 2025.

== Professional boxing career ==
Lescurat claimed the WBA female super-flyweight World title when she defeated Mexico's Maribel Ramirez by split decision in Buenos Aires, Argentina, on 24 June 2022.

She made the first defence of her title against Naylea Gil Sanabia winning the contest on 28 October 2022 by unanimous decision.

Next, she traveled to Paris, France, where she secured an eighth-round stoppage victory over Brazil's Daniela De Jesus Aguilar on 17 May 2023.

Lescurat then made further successful defenses with unanimous decision wins over Regina Chavez on 24 February 2024 back home in Argentina and Linn Sandström in Australia on 24 April 2024.

Lescurat retired from professional boxing in January 2025.

== Professional boxing record ==
| 11 fights | 11 wins | 0 losses |
|---|---|---|
| By knockout | 4 | 0 |
| By decision | 7 | 0 |

| No. | Result | Record | Opponent | Type | Round, time | Date | Location | Notes |
|---|---|---|---|---|---|---|---|---|
| 11 | Win | 11–0 | Linn Sandström | UD | 10 (10) | 24 April 2024 | Hordern Pavillion, Sydney, Australia | Retained WBA female super-flyweight title |
| 10 | Win | 10–0 | Regina Chavez | UD | 10 (10) | 24 February 2024 | Casino Buenos Aires, Buenos Aires, Argentina | Retained WBA female super-flyweight World title |
| 9 | Win | 9–0 | Daniela De Jesus Aguiar | TKO | 8 (10) | 17 May 2023 | Hotel Intercontinental, Paris, France | Retained WBA female super-flyweight World title |
| 8 | Win | 8–0 | Naylea Gil Sanabia | UD | 10 (10) | 28 October 2022 | Casino Buenos Aires, Buenos Aires, Argentina | Retained WBA female super-flyweight title |
| 7 | Win | 7–0 | Maribel Ramirez | SD | 10 (10) | 24 June 2022 | Casino Buenos Aires, Buenos Aires, Argentina | Won WBA female super-flyweight title |
| 6 | Win | 6–0 | Nataly Delgado | SD | 10 (10) | 11 March 2022 | Majestic Casino, Panama City, Panama | |
| 5 | Win | 5–0 | Yusbely Torrealba | TKO | 3 (8) | 13 November 2021 | Coliseo Zona Norte, Sabaneta, Colombia | |
| 4 | Win | 4–0 | Kairuan Montenegro | TKO | 2 (6) | 22 October 2021 | Coliseo Sugar Baby Rojas, Barranquilla, Colombia | |
| 3 | Win | 3–0 | Roxana Ayelen Bermudez | UD | 6 (6) | 2 October 2021 | Club Athletico, Lanus, Argentina | |
| 2 | Win | 2–0 | Tamara Bustamante | UD | 4 (4) | 27 August 2021 | Parana Futbol Club, San Pedro, Argentina | |
| 1 | Win | 1–0 | Gisela Ibanez | TKO | 5 (6) | 9 April 2021 | Estadio Mary Teran de Weiss, Buenos Aires, Argentina | |
