= Malvinas Argentinas, Córdoba =

Coordinates: 31°22′11″S 64°03′11″W

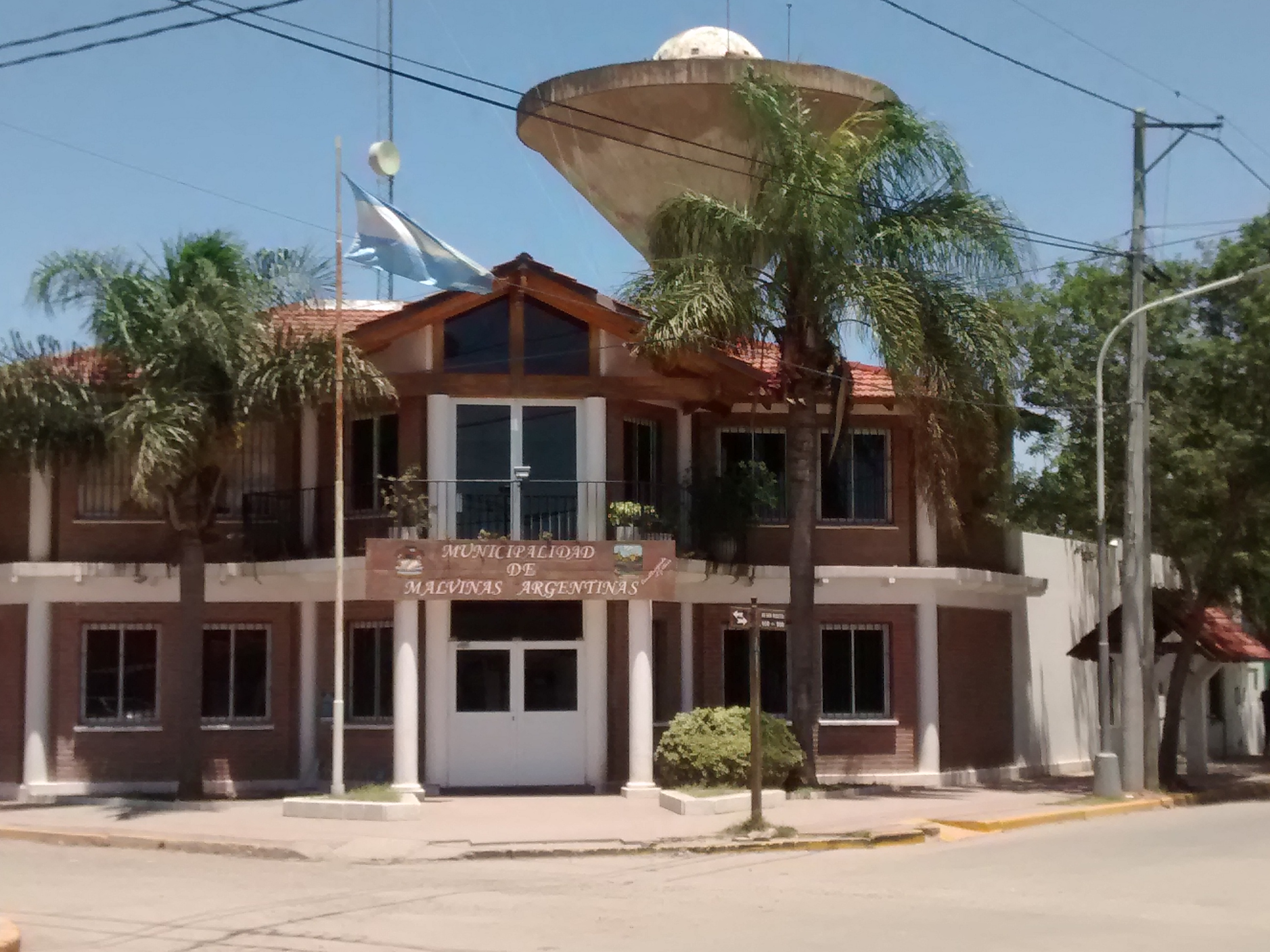
Municipal building.

Malvinas Argentinas is a municipality in the Department of Colón of Córdoba Province, Argentina. Its population is 8,628 (2001 Census), showing a 67% increase since the previous census (1991). It is a working-class suburb of Córdoba City, one of the poorest places in the Province. More than 26% of the people over 15 have not completed their elementary schooling.

The municipality's name reflects Argentina's claims of sovereignty over the Falkland Islands (Islas Malvinas in Spanish), and could be translated as "Argentine Falklands".
