= Timlin =

Timlin is a surname. Notable people with the surname include:

- Addison Timlin (born 1991), American actress
- Amy Timlin (born 1999), English professional boxer
- Andrew Timlin (born 1974), New Zealand field hockey player
- I.R. Timlin (1880–1955), American architect
- James Timlin (1927–2023), Catholic Bishop of Scranton
- Mark Timlin (born 1944), British author
- Michael Timlin (born 1985), English-born Irish international footballer
- Mike Timlin (born 1966), American Major League Baseball pitcher
- Robert Timlin (1932–2017), American jurist, Senior District Judge for the Central District of California
- Thomas F. Timlin (1863–1903), American politician, member of the Wisconsin State Assembly
- William H. Timlin (1852–1916), American jurist
- William M. Timlin (1892–1943), South African architect and illustrator
