= Nina Hughes =

English professional boxer (born 1982)

Personal information
- Nationality: English
- Born: Nina Smith; 29 August 1982 (age 44) Grays, Essex, England
- Height: 5 ft 3 in (1.60 m)
- Weight: Bantamweight; Super bantamweight

Boxing career
- Stance: Orthodox

Boxing record
- Total fights: 9
- Wins: 7
- Win by KO: 2
- Losses: 2

Nina Hughes (née Smith born 29 August 1982) is an English former professional boxer. She held the WBA female bantamweight World title from 26 November 2022 until 12 May 2024.

== Biography ==
Aiming to improve her fitness, Hughes began taking part in boxercise classes at the age of 25.

She was persuaded to try boxing and later joined Chadwell St Mary Amateur Boxing Gym going on to have a storied amateur career that included becoming a four-time English National champion at 51 kg and 54 kg.

Hughes was part of the initial intake of female boxers into GB Boxing in 2009 but missed out on selection for the London 2012 Olympics with eventual gold medalist Nicola Adams taking the flyweight spot.

She stepped away from the ring and went on to get married and have two children only to be inspired to try her luck in the professional ranks aged 39 by the growing number of female fights being shown on television.

Hughes made her pro debut on 3 December 2021 at the York Hall in London securing a points win over Klaudia Ferenczi. In her third professional contest she claimed the Commonwealth and WBO International female super-bantamweight titles with a majority decision success against Tysie Gallagher at the Civic Hall in her hometown of Grays, Essex, on 30 July 2022.

After one defence, Hughes was given a shot at the WBA female World bantamweight title facing champion Jamie Mitchell at the Hilton Palm Jumeirah in Dubai on 26 November 2022. Despite being widely viewed as the underdog, Hughes defeated her American opponent by unanimous decision.In doing so, she became the fastest British professional boxer to win a world title, achieving the feat in just her fifth professional bout at the age of 40.

Hot on the heels of becoming world champion, Hughes signed a promotional deal with Eddie Hearn led Matchroom Boxing.

At Wembley Arena on 10 June 2023, Hughes made a successful first defence of her crown with a unanimous decision win over Katie Healy who was drafted in as a late replacement when scheduled challenger and former world champion Shannon Courtenay withdrew.

Having parted ways with Matchroom, Hughes signed up with International Boxing Hall of Fame promotor Lou DiBella in January 2024.

Hughes suffered her first professional defeat and lost her World title to Cherneka Johnson at the RAC Arena in Perth, Australia, on 12 May 2024 by majority decision. The fight ended in confusion when ring announcer Dan Hennessey initially declared Hughes the winner before correcting himself and announcing Johnson as the victor.

In the aftermath the WBA made Hughes the mandatory challenger for the title and a rematch was scheduled to take place in Sydney, Australia, on 22 March 2025. Hughes lost by stoppage in the seventh round.

Hughes announced her retirement from professional boxing on 29 May 2025, four days after defeating Nicholine Achieng on points over six rounds at York Hall, London, in a fight where she suffered a knock down in the final round.

== Professional boxing record ==
9 fights	7 wins	2 losses
By knockout	2	1
By decision	5	1

No.	Result	Record	Opponent	Type	Round, time	Date	Location	Notes
9	Win	7–2	Nicholine Achieng	PTS	6	25 May 2025	York Hall, London, England	
8	Loss	6–2	Cherneka Johnson	TKO	7 (10), 0:46	22 March 2025	Qudos Bank Arena, Sydney Olympic Park, Australia	For the WBA female bantamweight title
7	Loss	6–1	Cherneka Johnson	MD	10	12 May 2024	RAC Arena, Perth, Australia	Lost WBA female bantamweight title
6	Win	6–0	Katie Healy	UD	10	10 June 2023	Wembley Arena, Wembley, England	Retained WBA female bantamweight title
5	Win	5–0	Jamie Mitchell	UD	10	26 Nov 2022	Hilton Palm Jumeirah, Dubai, U.A.E	Won WBA female bantamweight title
4	Win	4–0	Flora Machela	TKO	2 (10), 2:00	15 Oct 2022	Civic Hall, Grays, England	Retained Commonwealth Super Bantamweight Title
3	Win	3–0	Tysie Gallagher	MD	10	30 Jul 2022	Civic Hall, Grays, England	Won vacant Commonwealth and vacant WBO International Super Bantamweight Title
2	Win	2–0	Bec Connolly	TKO	2 (8), 0:40	15 Apr 2022	York Hall, London, England	
1	Win	1–0	Claudia Ferenczi	PTS	6	3 Dec 2021	York Hall, London, England	
