= Tania Alvarez =

Spanish boxer (born 2002)

Personal information
- Nickname: La Violencia
- Born: Tania Alvarez Alter; 27 January 2002 (age 24) Barcelona, Cataluña, Spain
- Height: 166 cm (5 ft 5 in)
- Weight: Super-bantamweight, Featherweight

Boxing career
- Stance: Orthodox

Boxing record
- Total fights: 14
- Wins: 13
- Win by KO: 2
- Losses: 1

Tania Alvarez Alter (born 27 January 2002) is a Spanish former professional boxer. She held the European female super-bantamweight title from April 2024 until December 2025.

== Career ==
Alvarez made her professional boxing debut on 23 October 2021, defeating Natalia Francesca by majority decision in a four-round contest at the Casal Cultural i Recreatiu, Castellbisbal, Spain.

Having compiled a perfect record of seven wins from seven fights, she took on Australia's Skye Nicolson for the vacant WBC female featherweight Silver title on the undercard of the Amanda Serrano vs Erika Cruz undisputed female World featherweight championship bill at the Hulu Theater, Madison Square Garden, New York, USA on 4 February 2023. In what was her first fight held outside of her native Spain, she lost by unanimous decision.

Moving down a weight division and back on home ground at the Casal Cultural i Recreatiu where she had made her pro-debut, Alvarez faced Italy's Maria Cecchi for the vacant European super-bantamweight title on 13 April 2024. She won by unanimous decision with all three ringside judges scoring the fight 96–94. At the same venue on 30 November 2024, Alvarez made a successful first defense of her title, defeating French boxer Odelia Ben Ephraim via unanimous decision.

Alvarez was named the 2024 European Boxing Union female champion of the year.

Once again fighting at Casal Cultural i Recreatiu, she successfully defended her title against Katie Healy on 12 April 2025, winning by unanimous decision.

Aged 23, Alvarez announced her retirement from professional boxing in December 2025, later revealing her decision was due to anxiety particularly to do with issues around weight cutting.

== Professional boxing record ==
14 fights	13 wins	1 loss
By knockout	2	0
By decision	11	1

No.	Result	Record	Opponent	Type	Round, time	Date	Location	Notes
14	Win	13–1	Katie Healy	UD	10	12 Apr 2025	Casal Cultural i Recreatiu, Castellbisbal, Spain	Retained the European female super-bantamweight title
13	Win	12–1	Odelia Ben Ephraim	UD	10	30 Nov 2024	Casal Cultural i Recreatiu, Castellbisbal, Spain	Retained the European female super-bantamweight title
12	Win	11–1	Maria Cecchi	UD	10	13 Apr 2024	Casal Cultural i Recreatiu, Castellbisbal, Spain	For the vacant European female super-bantamweight title
11	Win	10–1	Natalia Francesca	UD	8	18 Nov 2023	Casal Cultural i Recreatiu, Castellbisbal, Spain	
10	Win	9–1	Jessica Brunet	TKO	5 (6)	16 Jun 2023	Casal Municipal, Castellbisbal, Spain	
9	Win	8–1	Angelika Oles	UD	6	14 Apr 2023	Casal Cultural i Recreatiu, Castellbisbal, Spain	
8	Loss	7–1	Skye Nicolson	UD	10	4 Feb 2023	Hulu Theater, Madison Square Garden, New York, USA	For the vacant WBC female featherweight Silver title
7	Win	7–0	Yaiza Souto	TKO	5 (6)	18 Nov 2022	Casal Cultural i Recreatiu, Castellbisbal, Spain	
6	Win	6–0	Enerolisa de Leon	MD	6	15 Oct 2022	Casal Cultural i Recreatiu, Castellbisbal, Spain	
5	Win	5–0	Vanesa Caballero	UD	6	11 Jun 2022	Casal Cultural i Recreatiu, Castellbisbal, Spain	
4	Win	4–0	Eva Cantos	MD	6	2 Apr 2022	Casal Cultural i Recreatiu, Castellbisbal, Spain	
3	Win	3–0	Cara McLaughlin	UD	4	26 Feb 2022	Centro Deportivo Municipal Mundet, Barcelona, Spain	
2	Win	2–0	Daisy Preston	UD	4	18 Dec 2021	Casal Cultural i Recreatiu, Castellbisbal, Spain	
1	Win	1–0	Natalia Francesca	MD	4	23 Oct 2021	Casal Cultural i Recreatiu, Castellbisbal, Spain	
