= Katie Healy =

English boxer (born 1998)

Personal information
- Born: 6 April 1998 (age 28) Walsall, England
- Height: 170 cm (5 ft 7 in)
- Weight: Super-bantamweight, Bantamweight

Boxing career
- Stance: Orthodox

Boxing record
- Total fights: 11
- Wins: 9
- Win by KO: 0
- Losses: 2

Katie Healy (born 6 April 1998) is an English professional boxer. She has held the WBF female World super-bantamweight and Commonwealth female Silver super-bantamweight titles as well as unsuccessfully challenging for the WBA female bantamweight championship.

== Professional career ==
A former kickboxing world champion, Healy made her professional boxing debut with a points victory over Klaudia Ferenczi in Sheffield on 21 May 2021. In just her fifth pro fight on 8 July 2022, she beat Matshidiso Mokebisi by unanimous decision to win the vacant WBF female World super-bantamweight title in a contest held at the Steve Tshwete Banquet Hall, Middelburg, South Africa.

Healy challenged champion Nina Hughes for the WBA female bantamweight championship at Wembley Arena in London on 10 June 2023 but lost by unanimous decision.

She returned to winning ways in her next fight on 8 December 2023 when she claimed the vacant Commonwealth female Silver super-bantamweight championship with a split decision success against Canada’s Shelly Barnett at Lions Centre, George Town in the Cayman Islands.

Healey challenged European female super-bantamweight champion Tania Alvarez at Casal Cultural i Recreatiu in Castellbisbal, Spain, on 12 April 2025, losing via unanimous decision.

== Personal life ==
Healy went to Aston University and graduated with a 2:1 in BSc Business and Management.

== Professional boxing record ==
11 fights	9 wins	2 losses
By decision	9	2

No.	Result	Record	Opponent	Type	Round, time	Date	Location	Notes
11	Loss	9–2	Tania Alvarez	UD	10	12 April 2025	Casal Cultural i Recreatiu, Castellbisbal, Spain	For the European female super-bantamweight title
10	Win	9–1	Ashleigh Johnson	UD	10 (10)	2 November 2024	Lions Centre, George Town, Cayman Islands	Retained Commonwealth female Silver super-batamtanweight title
9	Win	8–1	Kira Carter	PTS	6 (6)	13 July 2024	Skate Central, Sheffield, England	
8	Win	7–1	Shelly Barnett	SD	10 (10)	8 December 2023	Lions Centre, George Town, Cayman Islands	Won vacant Commonwealth female Silver super-batamtanweight title
7	Loss	6–1	Nina Hughes	UD	10 (10)	10 June 2023	Wembley Arena, London, England	Lost challenge for WBA female bantamweight title
6	Win	6–0	Katherine Quintana	PTS	6 (6)	10 March 2023	The Hangar Events Venue, Wolverhampton, England	
5	Win	5–0	Matshidiso Mokebisi	UD	10 (10)	8 July 2022	Steve Tshwete Banquet Hall, Middleburg, South Africa	Won vacant WBF female super-batamtanweight World title
4	Win	4–0	Gabriella Mezei	PTS	6 (6)	3 April 2022	Magna Centre, Rotherham, England	
3	Win	3–0	Martina Horgasz	PTS	6 (6)	17 December 2021	H Suite, Edgbaston, Birmingham, England	
2	Win	2–0	Karina Szmalenberg	PTS	4 (4)	27 August 2021	Ponds Forge Arena, Sheffield, England	
1	Win	1–0	Klaudia Ferenczi	PTS	4 (4)	21 May 2021	Sheffield Arena Car Park, Sheffield, England	
