= Ebanie Bridges =

Australian boxer (born 1986)

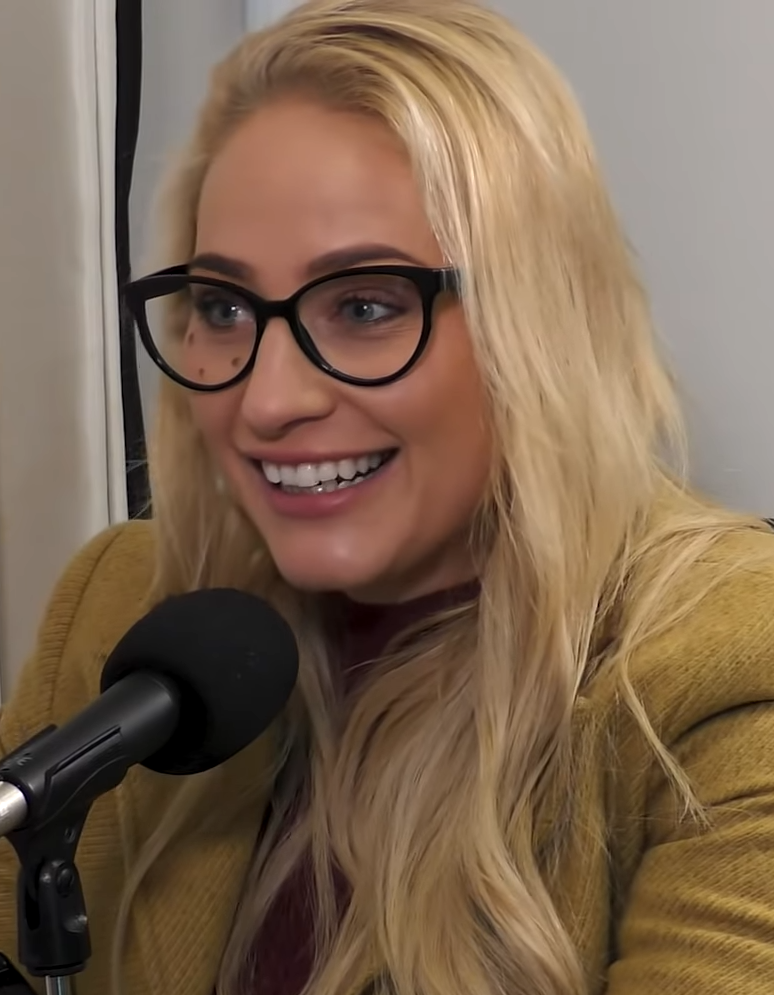
- Bridges in 2022

Personal information
- Nicknames: Blonde Bomber; Blonde Bombshell
- Born: 22 September 1986 (age 40) Sydney, New South Wales, Australia
- Height: 5 ft 1 in (155 cm)
- Weight: Bantamweight; Super-bantamweight

Boxing career
- Reach: 62 in (157 cm)
- Stance: Orthodox

Boxing record
- Total fights: 13
- Wins: 10
- Win by KO: 4
- Losses: 3
Medal record
Women's Boxing
Representing Australia
Australasian Golden Gloves
Gold medal – first place	2016 Brisbane	Bantamweight
Gold medal – first place	2017 Brisbane	Bantamweight

Ebanie Bridges (born 22 September 1986) is an Australian professional boxer. She held the IBF female bantamweight title between 2022 and 2023. As an amateur, Bridges won the gold medal in the women's bantamweight event at the 2016 and 2017 Australasian Golden Gloves.

== Early life ==
Bridges was born on 22 September 1986 and grew up in the Toongabbie suburb of Greater Western Sydney – the youngest child of three. She is the younger of twins by six minutes, and the only girl in her family. At the age of five, Bridges's parents introduced her to Karate – in which she competed until thirteen years of age. Shortly after, she trained in Kickboxing and Muay Thai at secondary school. She later found competitive bodybuilding – under the tutelage of Arina Manta – in which she competed for eight years and won numerous regional and state titles. She spoke of her teenage years being tough, though with her parents' help she overcame the difficulties: 'At 18, I decided I need to change my life.' When growing up, Bridges admired Kostya Tszyu, Julio Cesar Chavez, Mike Tyson, and Marco Antonio Barrera.

Bridges has been nicknamed the 'Blonde Bomber' due to her hair colour and her coach Arnel "Bomber" Barotillo.

== Amateur career ==
Bridges amassed a 26–4 amateur record from 2016 to 2018, during which she won the 2016 and 2017 National Golden Gloves titles, as well as the state championship titles at bantamweight. She also competed at the Australian Women Selection Tournament in Perth, however, she was defeated by Antonia Kay in the quarter-finals via a points-decision 4:1.

== Professional career ==
=== Early career ===
On 24 November 2018, Bridges was scheduled to take on Thai fighter Rungnapha Kaewrachang in a bantamweight contest at the Wollongong Fraternity Club, however, the fight was cancelled due to Kaewrachang experiencing fighting clearance issues. Bridges instead fought Bianca Elmir in an exhibition fight, though it was not recognised as a professional bout. Bridges made her professional debut on 8 February 2019 at the Hordern Pavilion in Sydney, on the undercard of Tim Tszyu vs. Denton Vassell against Filipino fighter Mahiecka Pareno (2–1–0), who Bridges defeated via majority decision, while having to get up from the canvas after Pareno dropped her in the first-round. During her fight with Pareno, it was later revealed that Bridges had broken her ankle but continued to carry on.

On 12 October 2019, Bridges fought Laura Woods, who Bridges defeated via TKO in the third-round, and then in the following month had defeated Kanittha Ninthim via second-round TKO.

In February 2020, Bridges signed a promotional contract with Split-T Management. She made her US debut on 8 February 2020, winning a six-round unanimous decision against Crystal Hoy at the Hammond Civic Center in Hammond, Indiana, with judges Jerry Jakubco, Nathan Palmer, and Skylar Slay scoring the fight 60–54 in favour of Bridges. In November 2020, after her defeat of Jorgelina Guanini, Rachel Ball had made her intentions known to face Bridges for the vacant WBA bantamweight title she had initially hoped to contest against Guanini.

On 13 March 2021, Bridges faced Carol Earl for the vacant Australian National Boxing Federation super-bantamweight title at Bankstown City Paceway in Sydney, in which Bridges secured a unanimous decision with Ian Batty, Wayne Douglas and Kevin Hogan scoring the fight 80–72, 80–72 and 79–73 in favour for Bridges.

=== WBA bantamweight title challenge ===
==== Bridges vs. Courtenay ====
On 14 March, it was confirmed that Bridges would face Shannon Courtenay in a world bantamweight title showdown, for the vacant WBA female bantamweight title, on the undercard of Conor Benn's defence his WBA Continental title against Samuel Vargas at the Copper Box Arena on 10 April. Courtenay had initially been hoped to fight Rachel Ball, however, with Ball recovering from coronavirus, Bridges had stepped in as a late replacement.

=== Return to the ring ===
After suffering her first professional loss to Courtenay, Bridges was booked to face Bec Connolly on 7 August 2021. She knocked Connolly down twice by the mid-point of the second round, before referee Kieran McCann stopped the bout. Bridges next faced Mailys Gangloff on 4 September 2021. She narrowly won the fight on points, with a scorecard of 77–76.

=== IBF bantamweight champion ===
==== Bridges vs. Román ====
Bridges challenged the reigning IBF female bantamweight champion María Cecilia Román, in what was Román's eight title defence. The fight took place at the First Direct Arena in Leeds, England, on 26 March 2022, on the undercard of the Kiko Martinez and Josh Warrington featherweight title bout. Bridges won the fight by unanimous decision. Two of the judges scored the fight 97–93 in her favour, while the third judge awarded her all 10 rounds of the bout.

==== Bridges vs. O'Connell ====
Back at the First Direct Arena in Leeds on 10 December 2022, Bridges made the first successful defense of her IBF bantamweight title by technical knockout in the eighth round against Shannon O'Connell.

==== Bridges vs. Yoshida ====
Bridges was scheduled to make the second defense of her IBF bantamweight title against Avril Mathie on 9 December 2023, at the Chase Center in San Francisco, California, USA, but due to injury Mathie withdrew. Bridges fought Miyo Yoshida and lost her title by unanimous decision.

=== Second comeback ===
==== Most Valuable Promotions ====
In July 2025, Bridges signed a promotional contract with Jake Paul-led Most Valuable Promotions.

==== Bridges vs. Araiza Mones ====
After more than two years away from the ring, Bridges returned the competitive boxing ring against face Alexis Araiza Mones in an eight round bantamweight bout at Coliseo Roberto Clemente in San Juan, Puerto Rico, on 3 January 2026. She lost by unanimous decision.

==== Bridges vs. Cotton ====
Bridges snapped her two-fight losing streak by defeating Ebonie Cotton on points, 59–56, over six rounds at Rainton Meadows Arena in Houghton-le-Spring, England, on 18 April 2026.

=== Weigh-ins ===
Contrary to accepted practices in women's fighting, Bridges chooses to weigh in before bouts in her underwear, often lingerie, stating on That Boxing Show podcast, "I wear lingerie, I like lingerie, I've got massive (expletive), like, I'm gonna (expletive) show it off. Like, I was a bodybuilder for 10 years. I used to stand on stage in a tiny little (underwear), flexing, posing and being all cute".

== Professional boxing record ==
13 fights	10 wins	3 losses
By knockout	4	0
By decision	6	3

No.	Result	Record	Opponent	Type	Round, time	Date	Location	Notes
13	Win	10–3	Ebonie Cotton	PTS	6	18 Apr 2026	Rainton Meadows Arena, Houghton-le-Spring, England	
12	Loss	9–3	Alexis Araiza Mones	UD	8	3 Jan 2026	Coliseo Roberto Clemente, San Juan, Puerto Rico	
11	Loss	9–2	Miyo Yoshida	UD	10	9 Dec 2023	Chase Center, San Francisco, California, U.S.	Lost IBF female bantamweight title
10	Win	9–1	Shannon O'Connell	TKO	8 (10)	10 Dec 2022	First Direct Arena, Leeds, England	Retained IBF female bantamweight title
9	Win	8–1	María Cecilia Román	UD	10	26 Mar 2022	First Direct Arena, Leeds, England	Won IBF female bantamweight title
8	Win	7–1	Mailys Gangloff	PTS	8	4 Sep 2021	AMT Headingley Rugby Stadium, Leeds, England	
7	Win	6–1	Bec Connolly	TKO	3 (8), 1:22	7 Aug 2021	Matchroom Headquarters, Brentwood, England	
6	loss	5–1	Shannon Courtenay	UD	10	10 Apr 2021	Copper Box Arena, London, England	For vacant WBA female bantamweight title
5	Win	5–0	Carol Earl	UD	8	13 Mar 2021	Bankstown City Paceway, Sydney, Australia	Won vacant ANBF Australasian female super-bantamweight title
4	Win	4–0	Crystal Hoy	UD	6	8 Feb 2020	Hammond Civic Center, Hammond, Indiana, U.S.	
3	Win	3–0	Kanittha Ninthim	TKO	2 (4), 1:15	30 Nov 2019	Brisbane Convention & Exhibition Centre, Brisbane, Australia	
2	Win	2–0	Laura Woods	TKO	3 (4), 0:26	12 Oct 2019	Club Punchbowl, Sydney, Australia	
1	win	1–0	Mahiecka Pareno	MD	3	8 Feb 2019	Hordern Pavilion, Sydney, Australia	

== Personal life ==
Bridges is a qualified mathematics teacher, taught at Airds High School and Westfields Sports High, and lives in Dural, New South Wales. While studying to become a maths teacher, she undertook a work placement at Mount Annan High School. While training as an amateur boxer, Bridges earned a Bachelor's degree in Mathematics with a minor in Physical Education at Western Sydney University, followed by a master's degree in Teaching, during which she graduated at the top of her class. Bridges speaks three languages English, Portuguese and Spanish. She has a black belt in Karate.

Bridges competed in the fourth season of SAS Australia, being eliminated in episode 11.

She is a supporter of English Premier League side Leeds United.

Bridges is in a relationship with fellow former world champion boxer Kell Brook and she gave birth to their first child on 20 February 2025.

== See also ==
- List of female boxers
- List of IBF female world champions

Sporting positions
Regional boxing titles
New title	ANBF Australasian female super-bantamweight champion 13 March 2021 – 26 March 2022; Won world title	Vacant Title next held by Mariah Turner
World boxing titles
Preceded by María Cecilia Román	IBF female bantamweight champion 26 March 2022 – 9 December 2023	Succeeded by Miyo Yoshida
