= Jamie Mitchell (boxer) =

American boxer

Personal information
- Nickname: The Miracle
- Born: January 31, 1985 (age 41) Los Angeles, California, U.S.
- Height: 5 ft 2 in (157 cm)
- Weight: Bantamweight

Boxing career
- Stance: Orthodox

Boxing record
- Total fights: 12
- Wins: 9
- Win by KO: 5
- Losses: 1
- Draws: 2

Jamie Lorraine Mitchell (born January 31, 1985) is an American professional boxer who held the WBA female bantamweight from October 2021 until November 2022

== Early life ==
Mitchell grew up in foster care and spent time in various juvenile detention facilities. As a teenager she spent time at Shiloh Treatment Center in Texas. While at the facility, Mitchell got into a fight and broke another girl's jaw. When asked by one of the facility's owners what they could do to help, Mitchell said she wanted to become a boxer. The owner, who later became her coach, also owned a boxing gym in Houston and agreed to send her there for training. Mitchell said of her first day in the gym, "they threw me in with this girl and she was like super tall and way older than me, she was like 32. I thought she was beating me up really bad, but they called me 'Mike Tyson's daughter' and from that point on I just kept coming back, I was just being relentless about it. I just loved it. That was my way into the game."

== Professional career ==
Mitchell made her professional debut on January 21, 2017, scoring a four-round unanimous decision (UD) victory against Dalia Gomez at the Alameda County Fairgrounds in Pleasanton, California.

After compiling a record of 6–0–2 (4 KOs), Mitchell faced Shannon Courtenay for the WBA female bantamweight title on October 9, 2021 at the Echo Arena in Liverpool, England. The bout was set to serve as Courtenay's first defense of the WBA title she won in April, however, she was stripped of the title 24 hours before the bout after failing to weigh within the bantamweight limit, meaning only Mitchell would be eligible to win the now vacant title. Mitchell defeated Courtenay via majority decision (MD) over ten rounds, with two judges scoring the bout 97–93 and 96–94 in favour of Mitchell while the third judge scored it a draw at 95–95.

The first defense of her title came against Carly Skelly on February 5, 2022 at the Footprint Center in Phoenix, Arizona. After scoring knockdowns in rounds one and two, Mitchell threw a combination of punches in the fourth round that prompted the referee to call a halt to the contest, handing Mitchell a fourth-round technical knockout victory.

Mitchell lost her title to Nina Hughes going down to a unanimous decision defeat in a contest held at the Hilton Palm Jumeirah in Dubai on 26 November 2022.

== Professional boxing record ==
12 fights	9 wins	1 loss
By knockout	5	0
By decision	4	1
Draws	2	

No.	Result	Record	Opponent	Type	Round, time	Date	Location	Notes
12	Win	9–1–2	Lindsay Garbatt	MD	10	Mar 31, 2023	Kendal G. L. Isaacs National Gymnasium, Nassau, Bahamas	
11	Loss	8–1–2	Nina Hughes	UD	10	Nov 26, 2022	Hilton Palm Jumeirah, Dubai, U.A.E	Lost WBA female bantamweight title
10	Win	8–0–2	Carly Skelly	TKO	4 (10), 1:32	Feb 5, 2022	Footprint Center, Phoenix, Arizona, U.S.	Retained WBA female bantamweight title
9	Win	7–0–2	Shannon Courtenay	MD	10	Oct 9, 2021	Echo Arena, Liverpool, England	Won vacant WBA female bantamweight title
8	Win	6–0–2	Noemi Bosques	TKO	5 (6), 1:49	Mar 5, 2021	Dort Federal Credit Union Event Center, Flint, Michigan, U.S.	
7	Draw	5–0–2	Britain Hart	MD	6	Aug 2, 2019	Thomas & Mack Center, Paradise, Nevada, U.S.	
6	Win	5–0–1	Ana Karen Compean	TKO	2 (4), 1:26	Nov 30, 2018	Big Punch Arena, Tijuana, Mexico	
5	Win	4–0–1	Viridiana Perez Mendiola	UD	4	Sep 22, 2018	Big Punch Arena, Tijuana, Mexico	
4	Win	3–0–1	Claudia Vargas Ramírez	TKO	1 (4), 0:32	Jun 23, 2018	Agua Caliente Casino and Resort, Tijuana, Mexico	
3	Draw	2–0–1	Shurretta Metcalf	SD	4	Feb 22, 2018	Frontiers of Flight Museum, Dallas, Texas, U.S.	
2	Win	2–0	Letrail Solomon	TKO	2 (4), 0:51	Jun 25, 2017	Ford Community Center, Dearborn, Michigan, U.S.	
1	Win	1–0	Dalia Gomez	UD	4	Jan 21, 2017	Alameda County Fairgrounds, Pleasanton, California, U.S.	

Sporting positions
World boxing titles
Vacant Title last held by Shannon Courtenay	WBA female bantamweight champion October 9, 2021 – 26, November 2022	Succeeded by Nina Hughes
