= Débora Dionicius =

Argentine boxer

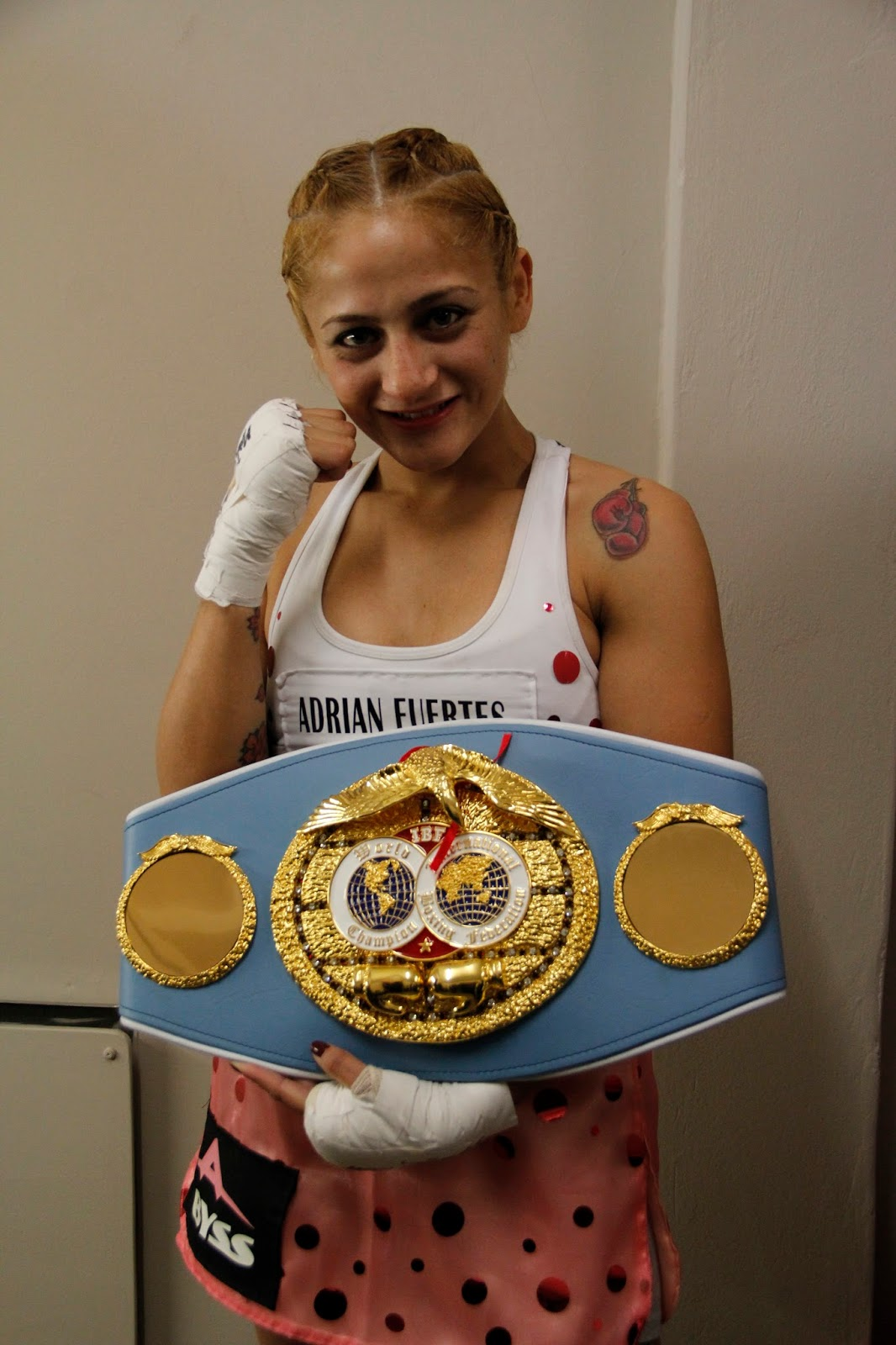

Personal information
- Nickname: La Gurisa
- Born: 19 March 1988 (age 38) Villaguay, Argentina
- Height: 5 ft 4 in (163 cm)
- Weight: Super flyweight; Bantamweight; Featherweight

Boxing career
- Stance: Orthodox

Boxing record
- Total fights: 39
- Wins: 35
- Win by KO: 6
- Losses: 4

Débora Anahi Dionicius (born 19 March 1988) is an Argentine professional boxer. She has held the WBO interim female featherweight title since November 2021 and previously the IBF female super flyweight title from 2012 to 2018.

== Professional boxing record ==
39 fights	35 wins	4 losses
By knockout	6	0
By decision	29	4

No.	Result	Record	Opponent	Type	Round, time	Date	Location	Notes
39	Win	35–4	Marcela Acuña	UD	10	23 Dec 2022	Club Sarmiento, Resistencia, Argentina	Won vacant WBO female super bantamweight title
38	Win	34–4	Antonella Shirley Molina	UD	6	11 Nov 2022	Club Atletico Union y Fraternidad, San Salvador, Argentina	
37	Win	33–4	Lilian Dolores Silva	UD	6	9 Sep 2022	Club Atletico Estudiantes, Parana, Argentina	
36	Loss	32–4	Brenda Karen Carabajal	MD	10	13 May 2022	Estadio Municipal Hector Gallucci, San Lorenzo, Argentina	Lost WBO interim female featherweight title
35	Win	32–3	Marcela Acuña	UD	10	20 Nov 2021	Estadio Luna Park, Buenos Aires, Argentina	Won vacant WBO interim female featherweight title
34	Win	31–3	Lilian Silva	UD	6	29 Oct 2021	Gimnasio Municipal, Concordia, Argentina	
33	Win	30–3	Gloria Yancaqueo	UD	6	30 Apr 2021	Polideportivo Libertad, Mar del Plata, Argentina	
32	Win	30–2	Aixa Adema	UD	10	13 Mar 2020	Estadio F.A.B., Buenos Aires, Argentina	Won vacant Argentine interim female bantamweight title
31	Win	29–2	Virginia Carcamo	UD	6	22 Nov 2019	Club Sportivo Barracas, Buenos Aires, Argentina	
30	Loss	28–2	Micaela Luján	UD	8	2 Mar 2019	Gimnasio Municipal Mario Lobos, Los Antiguos, Argentina	
29	Loss	28–1	Jorgelina Guanini	SD	10	14 Sep 2018	Club Ferro Carril, Concordia, Argentina	Lost IBF female super flyweight title
28	Win	28–0	Luna del Mar Torroba	UD	10	18 May 2018	Club Social y Deportivo Salud Pública, Villaguay, Argentina	Retained IBF female super flyweight title
27	Win	27–0	Terumi Nuki	UD	10	17 Feb 2018	Gimnasio Municipal Enrique Mosconi, Cutral Có, Argentina	Retained IBF female super flyweight title
26	Win	26–0	Julieta Andrea Ines Cardozo	TKO	9 (10)	3 Nov 2017	Gimnasio Municipal Enrique Mosconi, Cutral Có, Argentina	Retained IBF female super flyweight title
25	Win	25–0	Diana Fernández	UD	10	19 Aug 2017	Club Social y Cultural El Cruce, Malvinas Argentinas, Argentina	Retained IBF female super flyweight title
24	Win	24–0	Michelle Preston	UD	10	3 Dec 2016	Club Sportivo Rivadavia, Navarro, Argentina	Retained IBF female super flyweight title
23	Win	23–0	Alejandra de Lujan	UD	8	10 Sep 2016	Club Social y Deportivo Nahuel, Florencio Varela, Argentina	
22	Win	22–0	Luna del Mar Torroba	UD	10	12 Mar 2016	Estadio F.A.B., Buenos Aires, Argentina	
21	Win	21–0	Aline de Cassia Scaranello	UD	10	7 Nov 2015	Club Social y Cultural El Cruce, Malvinas Argentinas, Argentina	Retained IBF female super flyweight title
20	Win	20–0	Simona Galassi	SD	10	26 Jun 2015	Palasport, Manerba del Garda, Italy	Retained IBF female super flyweight title
19	Win	19–0	Florencia Roxana Canteros	UD	6	7 Mar 2015	Ce.De.M. No.2, Caseros, Argentina	
18	Win	18–0	Maria Magdalena Rivera	UD	6	18 Oct 2014	Club Social y Cultural El Cruce, Malvinas Argentinas, Argentina	
17	Win	17–0	Alejandra de Lujan	UD	8	16 May 2014	Polideportivo Municipal, Grand Bourg, Argentina	
16	Win	16–0	Neisi Torres	TKO	4 (10), 1:43	29 Mar 2014	Club Social y Cultural El Cruce, Malvinas Argentinas, Argentina	Retained IBF female super flyweight title
15	Win	15–0	Guadalupe Martínez Guzmán	UD	10	20 Dec 2013	Club Social y Cultural El Cruce, Malvinas Argentinas, Argentina	Retained IBF female super flyweight title
14	Win	14–0	Olga Julio	UD	10	7 Sep 2013	Estadio Luna Park, Buenos Aires, Argentina	Retained IBF female super flyweight title
13	Win	13–0	Marisa Joana Portillo	UD	10	6 Jul 2013	Club Huracán, Villaguay, Argentina	Retained IBF female super flyweight title
12	Win	12–0	Gabriela Bouvier	UD	10	13 Apr 2013	Club Atletico Echagüe, Paraná, Argentina	Retained IBF female super flyweight title
11	Win	11–0	Michelle Preston	UD	10	24 Nov 2012	Club Huracán, Villaguay, Argentina	Won vacant IBF female super flyweight title
10	Win	10–0	Waleria Rosrigues dos Santos	UD	10	6 Jul 2012	Club Huracán, Villaguay, Argentina	Retained South American female super flyweight title
9	Win	9–0	Stefany Bizquiazo	UD	10	5 May 2012	Club Huracán, Villaguay, Argentina	Won vacant South American female super flyweight title
8	Win	8–0	Natalia Vanesa Lopez	RTD	4 (8), 2:00	10 Mar 2012	Club Ferro Carril Oeste, Merlo, Argentina	
7	Win	7–0	Maria del Carmen Potenza	UD	6	17 Dec 2011	Parque Municipal Eva Perón, Lomas de Zamora, Argentina	
6	Win	6–0	Marta Soledad Juncos	TKO	1 (4), 1:55	15 Oct 2011	Centro Recreativo Néstor Carlos Kirchner, Buenos Aires, Argentina	
5	Win	5–0	Anahi Yolanda Salles	TKO	6 (6), 1:08	27 Aug 2011	Club Banco Provincia, City Bell, Argentina	
4	Win	4–0	Yessika Flavia Munoz	TKO	4 (4)	23 Jul 2011	Centro Recreativo Néstor Carlos Kirchner, Buenos Aires, Argentina	
3	Win	3–0	Yessika Flavia Munoz	UD	4	28 May 2011	Club Banco Provincia, City Bell, Argentina	
2	Win	2–0	Norma Elizabeth Caucota	UD	4	16 Apr 2011	Centro Recreativo Néstor Carlos Kirchner, Buenos Aires, Argentina	
1	Win	1–0	Natalia Vanesa Lopez	UD	4	19 Mar 2011	Club Atlético Argentino, La Carlota, Argentina	
