= Carly Skelly =

English boxer (born 1986)

Personal information
- Nickname: Thumper
- Nationality: English
- Born: 4 November 1986 (age 39) Liverpool, Merseyside, England
- Height: 157 cm (5 ft 2 in)
- Weight: Bantamweight, Super-bantamweight

Boxing career
- Stance: Southpaw

Boxing record
- Total fights: 6
- Wins: 4
- Losses: 1
- Draws: 1

Carly Skelly (born 4 November 1986) is an English former professional boxer. During her three-year career she held the WBC female super-bantamweight International title and challenged for the WBA female bantamweight title.

== Career ==
A qualified nurse, Skelly got her first taste of boxing when she took part in a charity bout aged 29. She joined North Mersey ABC going on to have an amateur career which included reaching the 2017 England Boxing National Amateur Championships female elite 51 kg final where she lost to future Commonwealth Games gold medalist Lisa Whiteside as well as representing England at the GB Championship.

Skelly turned professional in January 2019 under the management of Paul Stevenson at Everton Red Triangle and made her debut on 4 May that year when she defeated Bec Connolly on points in a four-round bout at Greenbank Sports Academy in Liverpool.

In her fourth pro-fight, she battled to a split decision draw with Amy Timlin in a contest for the vacant Commonwealth female super-bantamweight title on the undercard of the Oleksandr Usyk vs Derek Chisora heavyweight clash at Wembley Arena on 31 October 2020.

After almost a year away from the ring, Skelly returned to action on 23 October 2021, claiming the WBC female super-bantamweight International title with a unanimous decision win over Poland's Dorota Norek at Grand Central Hall in Liverpool.

Skelly challenged Jamie Mitchell for the WBA female bantamweight World title on 5 February 2022, but lost the fight, and her unbeaten record, when she was stopped in the fourth-round of the contest at Footprint Center in Phoenix, Arizona, USA. She was knocked down in rounds one and two and the fight was called to a halt by referee Wes Melton when she came under a barrage of unanswered punches with 30 seconds left in round four.

== Professional boxing record ==
6 fights	4 wins	1 loss
By knockout	0	1
By decision	4	0
Draws	1	

No.	Result	Record	Opponent	Type	Round, time	Date	Location	Notes
6	Loss	4–1–1	Jamie Mitchell	TKO	4 (10)	5 February 2022	Footprint Center, Phoenix, Arizona, USA	Lost challenge for the WBA female bantamweight World title
5	Win	4–0–1	Dorota Norek	UD	10 (10)	23 October 2021	Grand Central Hall, Liverpool, England	Won the vacant WBC female super-bantamweight International title
4	Draw	3–0–1	Amy Timlin	SD	10 (10)	31 October 2020	Wembley Arena, London, England	For the vacant Commonwealth female super-bantamweight title
3	Win	3–0	Klaudia Ferenczi	PTS	4 (4)	28 February 2020	Grand Central Hall, Liverpool, England	
2	Win	2–0	Roz Mari Silyanova	PTS	4 (4)	21 September 2019	Greenbank Sports Academy, Liverpool, England	
1	Win	1–0	Bec Connolly	PTS	4 (4)	4 May 2019	Greenbank Sports Academy, Liverpool, England	
