= Michelle Preston =

New Zealand boxer (born 1978)

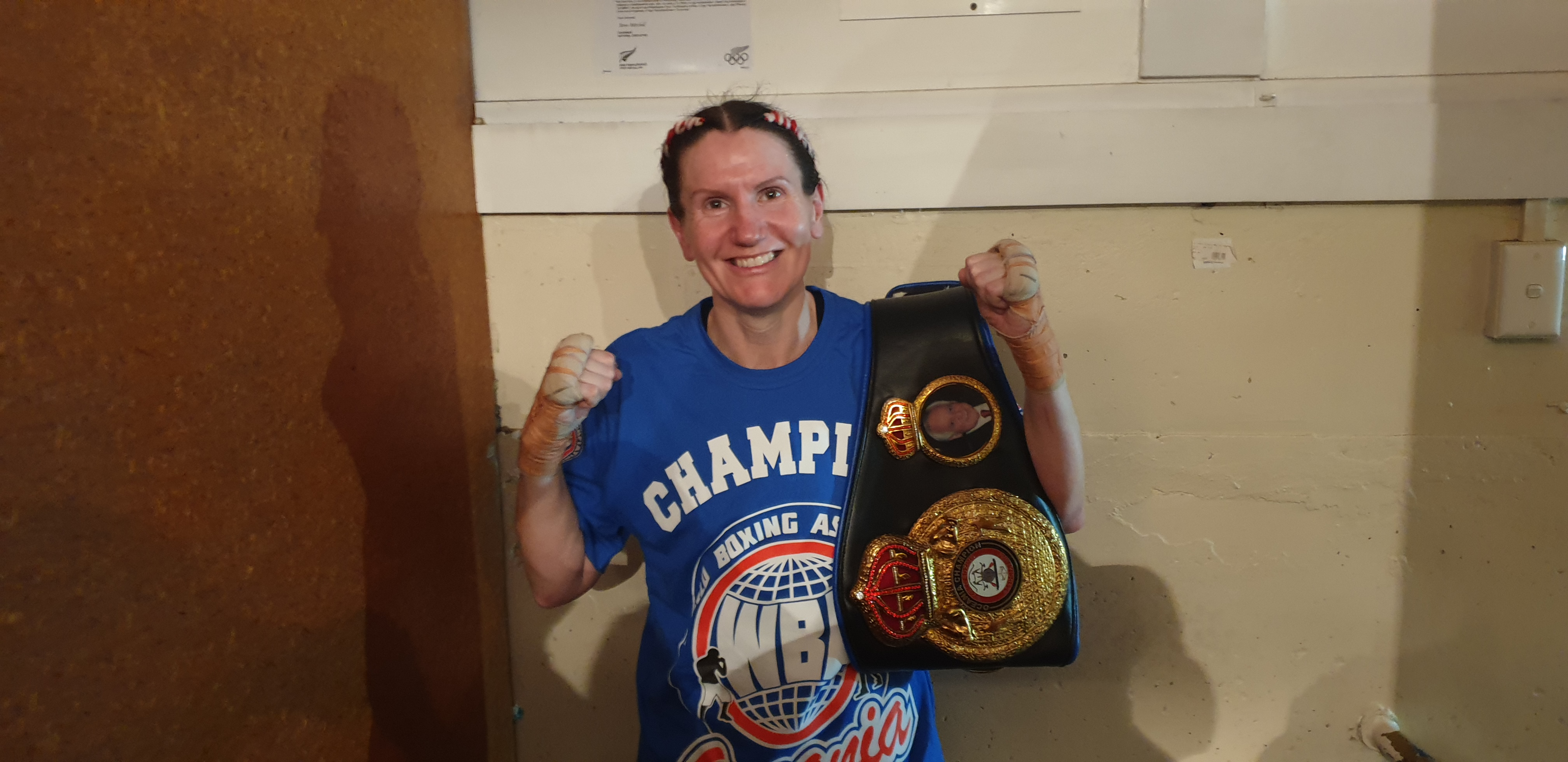
- Born: Michelle Preston; 11 November 1978 (age 48); Manchester, United Kingdom
- Nickname: Pressure
- Nationality: New Zealander; British (expatriate)
- Height: 164 cm (5 ft 5 in)
- Weight: 52.6 kg (116 lb; 8 st 4 lb)
- Division: super flyweight
- Style: orthodox

Professional boxing record
- Total: 22
- Wins: 11
- By knockout: 2
- Losses: 10
- Draws: 1

Kickboxing record
- Total: 60
- Wins: 46
- By knockout: 8
- Losses: 12
- Draws: 2

Other information
- Boxing record from BoxRec
- Last updated on: 5 July 2022

Michelle Preston (born 11 November 1978 in Manchester, United Kingdom) is a Muay Thai Fighter and professional boxer. Preston resides in Auckland, New Zealand, where she has fought most of her professional fights. Preston has held many titles including New Zealand National Title, WBA Regional title and WBO Regional title. Preston is also a World title contender, fighting for the IBF World super flyweight title against Argentinian World Champion Débora Anahi Dionicius. Preston is also a Five time World Kickboxing Champion. Preston has fought on four King in the Ring undercards. Preston won her last World title on 17 November 2017 on the Main Undercard of King in the Ring. Preston won the vacant WBC Muaythai World Super Flyweight Champion against Fani Peloumpi by Majority decision.

== Kickboxing and Muay Thai ==
Preston started Kickboxing when she was 14 years old. On 17 November 2017, Preston took on Fani Peloumpi for the WBC World Muay Thai Super Flyweight title. Preston planned to retire after this fight. Preston won the fight by Majority Decision at the Barfoot & Thompson Stadium.

== Professional boxing ==
In December 2007 she became the first female to win the WBA – PABA title. In November 2008, she became the first female to fight for the WBC – OPBF title, losing to Susie Q Ramadan. In July 2010, she become the first female to win the WBO Asia Pacific title. In November 2010 she became the first female to win a New Zealand national professional title by stoppage.

In July 2012, Preston spoken out about her frustrations with promoters in Boxing. She believes that women boxers are marginalised by promoters and that promoters see as a novelty. In July 2012, Preston received her highest ranking by a major boxing sanctioning body when she reach 2nd on the IBF Super Flyweight rankings. On 24 November 2012, Preston had her first attempt at a boxing world title, when she took on Argentina Boxer Débora Dionicius for the IBF World super flyweight title. Preston lost the fight by unanimous decision.

In April 2016, Preston took on Noemi Bosques. This was the first boxing fight for Preston in four years. Preston won the fight by majority decision. On 13 November 2016, Preston fought Débora Dionicius in a rematch for her second attempt at the world title for the World super flyweight title. Leading into the fight Preston was ranked 4th in the IBF, and 20th in the WBC. Preston lost the fight by unanimous decision.

In May 2022, Preston made her in-ring return against Holly McMath. The fight was close, but Preston won the fight by Split Decision. Shortly after the fight, it was announced that Preston would take on Phannaluk Kongsang for the WBA Oceania regional title, however, due to visa issues, the fight was postponed and Preston would fight Nicila Costello instead. Preston won the fight by Unanimous Decision, winning the WBA Oceania title. After the fight, Preston secured the ranking of 5th with the WBA in the Super Flyweight division. In September 2022, Preston took on Thailand boxer Phannaluk Kongsang for the WBA International Super Flyweight title. Preston won the fight by Unanimous Decision. As a result of the fight, Preston received a rating increase of second in the WBA Super Flyweight rankings.

== Combat sports titles ==
=== Boxing ===
- World Boxing Association
  - Pan Asian Boxing Association Bantamweight title
  - WBA Oceania Super Flyweight title
  - WBA International Super Flyweight title
- World Boxing Organisation
  - WBO Asia Pacific super flyweight title
- New Zealand National Boxing Federation
  - New Zealand National super flyweight title

=== Kickboxing ===
- World Mauy Thai Council
  - World Featherweight Title
- International Kickboxing Federation
  - World Lightweight Title
- World Kickboxing Federation
  - World Atomweight Title
  - New Zealand Flyweight Champion
- World Boxing Council Muaythai
  - World Super Flyweight Champion

== Professional boxing record ==
22 fights	11 wins	10 losses
By knockout	2	0
By decision	9	10
Draws	1	

Res.	Record	Opponent	Type	Rd., Time	Date	Location	Notes
Loss	11–10–1	(Mexico) Jaqueline Mucio Munoz	TD	6 (8)	27 May 2023	Eventfinda Stadiym, Auckland, New Zealand	
Loss	11–9–1	(Mexico) Maribel Ramirez	UD	10	18 March 2023	Eventfinda Stadiym, Auckland, New Zealand	WBA International Super Flyweight title
Win	11–8–1	(Thailand) Phannaluk Kongsang	UD	10	9 September 2022	Eventfinda Stadiym, Auckland, New Zealand	vacant WBA International Super Flyweight title
Win	10–8–1	(New Zealand) Nicila Costello	UD	8	5 August 2022	ABA Stadium, Auckland, New Zealand	vacant WBA Oceania Super Flyweight title
Win	9–8–1	(New Zealand) Holly McMath	SD	4	20 May 2022	Auckland War Memorial Museum, Auckland, New Zealand	
Lose	8–8–1	(Argentina) Débora Dionicius	UD	10	3 December 2016	Club Sportivo Rivadavia, Navarro, Buenos Aires, Argentina	IBF World super flyweight title
Win	8–7–1	(United States) Noemi Bosques	MD	8	16 April 2016	The Trusts Arena, Auckland, New Zealand	
Lose	7–7–1	(Argentina) Débora Dionicius	UD	10	24 November 2012	Club Huracán, Villaguay, Entre Rios, Argentina	Vacant IBF World super flyweight title
Lose	7–6–1	(Australia) Shannon O'Connell	UD	6	2012-06-29	ABA Stadium, Auckland, New Zealand	
Win	7–5–1	(New Zealand) Nicki Bigwood	TKD	4 (6), 1:18	2012-05-19	ASB Stadium, Kohimarama, New Zealand	
Draw	6–5–1	(New Zealand) Nicki Bigwood	TD	1 (6)	2011-08-25	(New Zealand) Takapuna Rugby Football Club, Northcote	
Loss	6–5	(Australia) Susie Ramadan	UD	10	2010-12-08	Acer Arena, Olympic Park, Homebush, New South Wales, Australia	
Win	6–4	(New Zealand) Shona Batty	TKO	5 (6), 1:28	2010-11-05	Langham Hotel, Auckland, New Zealand	Vacant New Zealand National Boxing Federation super flyweight title
Win	5–4	(Thailand) Jubjang Lookmakarmwan	UD	10	2010-07-09	Coral Reef Restaurant, Auckland, New Zealand	Vacant WBO Asia Pacific super flyweight title
Win	4–4	(New Zealand) Tina Payne	UD	4	2010-05-11	Queen Elizabeth Youth Centre, Tauranga, New Zealand	
Lose	3–4	(New Zealand) Christina Tai	UD	4	2010-01-31	ABA Stadium, Auckland, New Zealand	
Lose	3–3	(Japan) Rie Fujimoto	UD	10	2009-09-21	Korakuen Hall, Tokyo, Japan	WBC OPBF super flyweight title
Lose	3–2	(Australia) Susie Ramadan	UD	10	2009-03-20	Knox Basketball Stadium, Ferntree Gully, Victoria, Australia	WBC OPBF super bantamweight title
Lose	3–1	(Australia) Susie Ramadan	UD	10	2008-11-28	Knox Basketball Stadium, Ferntree Gully, Victoria, Australia	Vacant WBC OPBF super bantamweight title
Win	3–0	(New Zealand) Christina Tai	UD	4	2008-08-28	ABA Stadium, Auckland, New Zealand	
Win	2–0	(Australia) Edith Smith	UD	6	2007-12-21	Community Centre, Freemans Bay, New Zealand	vacant PABA bantamweight title
Win	1–0	(Australia) Georgia Keady	UD	6	2007-02-16	Knox Netball Centre, Ferntree Gully, Victoria, Australia	Professional Debut

== Personal life ==
Outside of combat sports, Preston is the Director of Life Plus, a recruitment company for the Health Sector in New Zealand.

== Awards ==
- New Zealand Boxing Awards
  - 2022 New Zealand Fight of the year
  - 2022 Returning Female Boxer of the year
