= Raven Chapman =

English boxer (born 1994)

Personal information
- Nickname: The Omen
- Born: 1 January 1994 (age 32) Norwich, Norfolk, England
- Height: 170 cm (5 ft 7 in)
- Weight: Featherweight

Boxing career
- Stance: Orthodox

Boxing record
- Total fights: 12
- Wins: 10
- Win by KO: 3
- Losses: 2

Raven Chapman (born 1 January 1994) is an English former professional boxer. She challenged for the WBC female featherweight title and was involved in the inaugural British female featherweight title fight.

== Career ==
After an amateur career which included winning the 2016 England Boxing National Amateur Championships elite female featherweight title and representing England on the international stage, Chapman turned professional in 2021. She made her pro-debut on 25 September that year with a fifth-round stoppage win over Polina Golubeva in Sheffield.

February 2022 saw Chapman sign a promotional deal with International Boxing Hall of Fame promoter Frank Warren. Her maiden fight under Warren's Queensbury Promotions banner was a first-round knockout of Gabriella Mezei at York Hall in London on 20 May 2022.

In just her fourth professional contest, Chapman beat former world champion Jorgelina Guanini via unanimous decision to claim the vacant WBC female International featherweight title on the undercard of the Joe Joyce vs Joseph Parker clash at Manchester Arena on 24 September 2022.

Chapman successfully defended her title three times in 2023, with unanimous decision wins over ex-world champion Linda Laura Lecca on 25 March, unbeaten Lila dos Santos Furtado on 18 August and Lucie Sedlackova on 1 December.

She retained her belt for a fourth time by defeating unbeaten Yohana Sarabia via unanimous decision on the undercard of the Joe Joyce vs Derek Chisora contest at The O2 Arena in London on 27 July 2024, with the three ringside judges all scoring the fight 100-90.

Having been named mandatory challenger earlier in the year, Chapman fought WBC female featherweight champion Skye Nicolson at Kingdom Arena in Riyadh, Saudi Arabia, on 12 October 2024, in what was the first women's world title boxing fight held in Saudi Arabia, and the first women’s bout to feature on a Riyadh Season show. Nicolson won by unanimous decision, inflicting the first loss of Chapman's professional career.

Chapman faced Karriss Artingstall for the inaugural British female featherweight title at the Royal Albert Hall in London on 7 March 2025. She was knocked to the canvas in the second round and, although she recovered to finish the bout, lost via unanimous decision.

On 24 July 2026, Chapman collapsed after a sparring session in Denmark and was airlifted by helicopter to hospital where she was diagnosed with a bleed on the brain, underwent surgery and placed in a medically induced coma. On 5 August, her management team released a statement saying she had subsequently been taken off the sedatives and was awaiting a "medically supervised repatriation to a hospital in the UK." In a statement released on 19 August, her family said Chapman had returned to the United Kingdom adding: "There is still a road ahead, and we’re taking things one day at a time, but Raven continues to amaze us with her strength, positivity and determination." The boxer herself posted a message on social media later that day stating: "Feeling very lucky to be back home and surrounded by family." In an interview with BBC South Today on 28 October 2026, Chapman conceded her boxing career was over saying she "probably would never get a licence again" and that, even if she were to be granted one, she "wouldn't want to risk putting my loved ones through that pain of it again."

== Professional boxing record ==
| 12 fights | 10 wins | 2 losses |
|---|---|---|
| By knockout | 3 | 0 |
| By decision | 7 | 2 |

| No. | Result | Record | Opponent | Type | Round, time | Date | Location | Notes |
|---|---|---|---|---|---|---|---|---|
| 12 | Win | 10–2 | Georgia Klein | TKO | 4 (6) | 27 Jun 2026 | Harrow Leisure Centre, Harrow, London, England | |
| 11 | Loss | 9–2 | Karriss Artingstall | UD | 10 | 7 Mar 2025 | Royal Albert Hall, London, England | For inaugural British female featherweight title |
| 10 | Loss | 9–1 | Skye Nicolson | UD | 10 | 12 Oct 2024 | Kingdom Arena, Riyadh, Saudi Arabia | For WBC female featherweight title |
| 9 | Win | 9–0 | Yohana Sarabia | UD | 10 | 27 Jul 2024 | The O2 Arena, London, England | Retained WBC female International featherweight title |
| 8 | Win | 8–0 | Lucie Sedlackova | UD | 10 | 12 Dec 2023 | York Hall, London, England | Retained WBC female International featherweight title |
| 7 | Win | 7–0 | Lila dos Santos Furtado | UD | 10 | 18 Aug 2023 | York Hall, London, England | Retained WBC female International featherweight title |
| 6 | Win | 6–0 | Linda Laura Lecca | UD | 10 | 25 Mar 2023 | Telford International Centre, Telford, England | Retained WBC female International featherweight title |
| 5 | Win | 5–0 | Fatuma Yazidu | UD | 8 | 12 Nov 2022 | Yume Nightclub, Dubai, UAE | |
| 4 | Win | 4–0 | Jorgelina Guanini | UD | 8 | 24 Sep 2022 | Manchester Arena, Manchester, England | Won vacant WBC female International featherweight title |
| 3 | Win | 3–0 | Gabriella Mezei | KO | 1 (6), 0:58 | 20 May 2022 | York Hall, London, England | |
| 2 | Win | 2–0 | Karina Szmalenberg | PTS | 6 | 13 Nov 2021 | Sheffield Arena, Sheffield, England | |
| 1 | Win | 1–0 | Polina Golubeva | TKO | 5 (6), 0:53 | 25 Sep 2021 | OEC Sheffield, Sheffield, England | |
