= Micaela Luján =

Argentina boxer (born 1999)

Personal information
- Nickname: La Princesita
- Born: 12 June 1999 (age 27) Villa Mercedes, San Luis, Argentina
- Height: 158 cm (5 ft 2 in)
- Weight: Super flyweight

Boxing career
- Stance: Orthodox

Boxing record
- Total fights: 21
- Wins: 17
- Win by KO: 6
- Losses: 3
- Draws: 1

Micaela Milagros Luján (born 12 June 1999) is an Argentine professional boxer who is a former IBF female junior bantamweight champion.

Campeona Argentina y Sudamericana Súper Mosca 2023 .. Campeona Argentina Mosca 2025. Campeona Sudamericana Súper Mosca 2026.

== Professional career ==
Luján made her professional debut on 28 January 2017, scoring a first-round knockout (KO) victory against Mileydis Mercado on 22 November 2015, at the Hotel Cisne Campestre in Puerto Colombia, Colombia.

After compiling a record of 8–1 (3 KOs), she faced reigning champion Jorgelina Guanini for the IBF female junior bantamweight title on 15 June 2019, at the Estadio F.A.B. in Buenos Aires, Argentina. After a closely contested ten-round bout, the result was announced as a majority draw to see Guanini retain her title. Two judges scoring the bout 95–95 while the third scored it 96–94 in favour of Luján.

After being out of the ring for nearly two years, she next fought on 30 January 2021, facing Débora Gómez for the vacant IBF female junior bantamweight title at the Complejo Multifuncion in Pérez, Argentina. In her second attempt at a world title, Luján emerged victorious via split decision (SD). Two judges scored the bout 97–93 in favour of Luján while the third scored it 97–93 to Gómez.

== Professional boxing record ==
17 fights	14 wins	2 losses
By knockout	5	0
By decision	9	2
Draws	1	

No.	Result	Record	Opponent	Type	Round, time	Date	Location	Notes
17	Loss	14–2–1	(Argentina) Carla Ayelen Merino	UD	10	27 Apr 2024	Monaco Hotel and Resort, Villa Carlos Paz, Argentina	Lost South American female super-flyweight title
16	Win	14–1–1	(Argentina) Vanesa Lorena Taborda	TKO	6 (10)	25 Nov 2023	Estadio José María Gatica, Villa Mercedes, Argentina	Retained South American female super-flyweight title
15	Win	13–1–1	(Argentina) Carolina Ornella Ferrari	TKO	7 (10)	29 Sep 2023	Centro de Educación Física Nº 58, General Pinto, Argentina	Won vacant South American female super-flyweight title
14	Win	12–1–1	(Argentina) Eliana Vanesa Orecchia	UD	6	25 Aug 2023	Estadio José María Gatica, Villa Mercedes, Argentina	
13	Win	11–1–1	(Mexico) Irma Garcia	MD	10	20 Aug 2022	Parque La Pedrera, Villa Mercedes, Argentina	Retained IBF female junior-bantamweight title
12	Win	10–1–1	(Panama) Nataly Delgado	UD	10	16 Jul 2021	Estadio José María Gatica, San Luis, Villa Mercedes, Argentina	Retained IBF female junior-bantamweight title
11	Win	9–1–1	(Argentina) Débora Gómez	SD	10	30 Jan 2021	Complejo Multifuncion, Pérez, Argentina	Won vacant IBF female junior-bantamweight title
10	Draw	8–1–1	(Argentina) Jorgelina Guanini	MD	10	15 Jun 2019	Estadio F.A.B., Buenos Aires, Argentina	For IBF female junior-bantamweight title
9	Win	8–1	(Argentina) Débora Dionicius	UD	8	2 Mar 2019	Gimnasio Municipal Mario Lobos, Los Antiguos, Argentina	
8	Win	7–1	(Argentina) Virginia Noemi Carcamo	UD	6	12 Jan 2019	Estadio Municipal, Pérez, Argentina	
7	Loss	6–1	(Mexico) Iris Miramontes	SD	4	4 Nov 2017	Arena Jalisco, Guadalajara, Mexico	
6	Win	6–0	(Mexico) María Guadalupe Rodríguez	UD	6	9 Sep 2017	Lienzo Charro El Salamantino, Salamanca, Mexico	
5	Win	5–0	(Mexico) Eloisa Martínez	UD	8	25 Aug 2017	Salon de Sociedad Espanola, Villa Mercedes, Argentina	
4	Win	4–0	(Mexico) Eloisa Martínez	UD	4	15 Jul 2017	Salamanca, Mexico	
3	Win	3–0	(Mexico) Jessica Yazmin Gómez	TKO	1 (4), 1:20	20 May 2017	Salamanca, Mexico	
2	Win	2–0	(Mexico) Janeth Osorio	TKO	1 (4), 0:59	25 Mar 2017	Salamanca, Mexico	
1	Win	1–0	(Colombia) Mileydis Mercado	KO	1 (4), 1:53	28 Jan 2017	Hotel Cisne Campestre, Puerto Colombia, Colombia	

Sporting positions
World boxing titles
Vacant Title last held by Jorgelina Guanini	IBF female junior bantamweight champion 30 January 2021 – 2022	Vacant Title next held by Irma Garcia
