= Shannon O'Connell =

Australian boxer (born 1983)

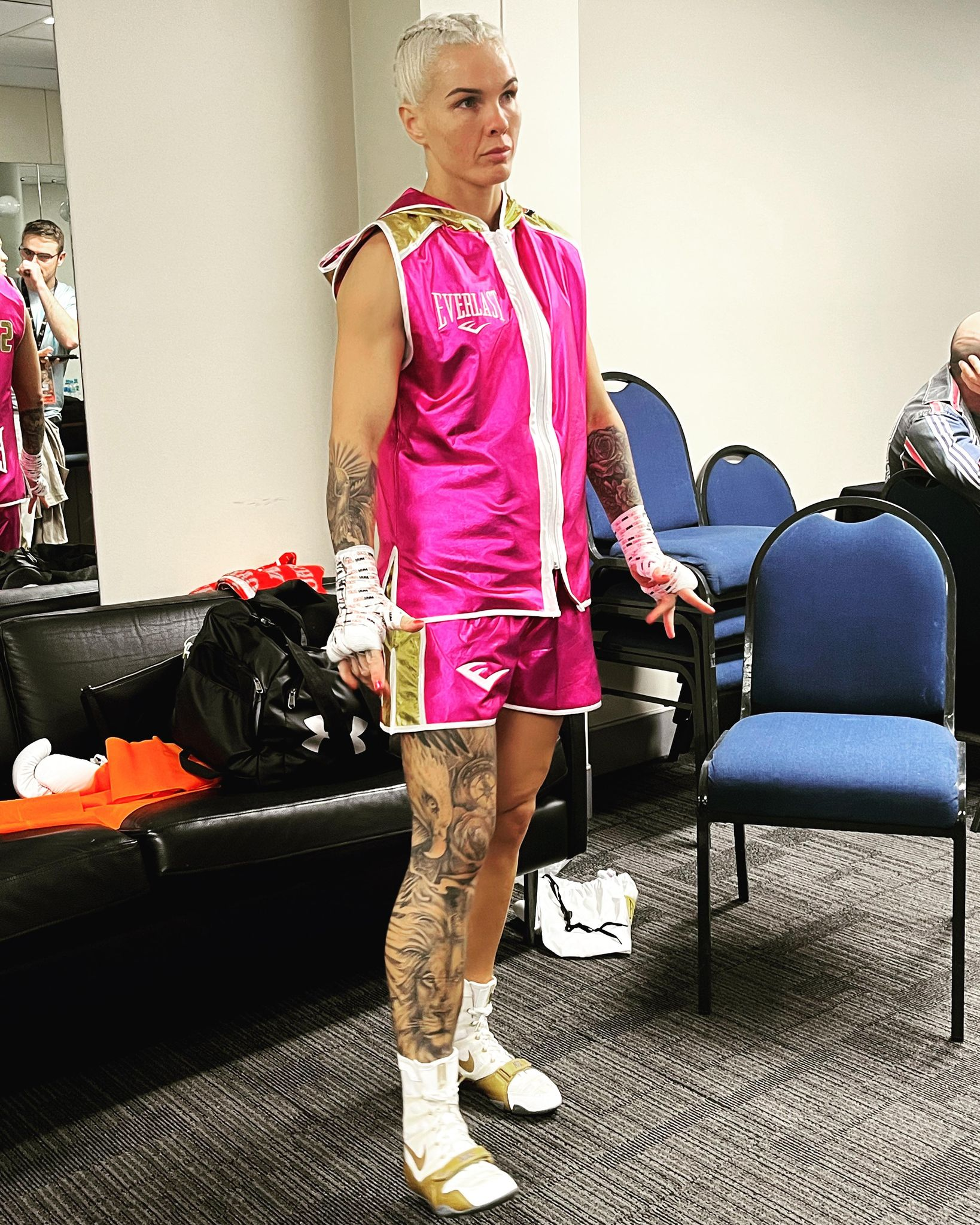
- O'Connell in 2022

Personal information
- Nicknames: Shotgun, The Queen of Australian Boxing
- Born: 20 January 1983 (age 43) Adelaide, Australia
- Height: 165 cm (5 ft 5 in)
- Weight: Featherweight, Super-bantamweight, Bantamweight

Boxing career

Boxing record
- Total fights: 35
- Wins: 26
- Win by KO: 13
- Losses: 8
- Draws: 1

Shannon O'Connell (born 20 January 1983) is an Australian professional boxer who has held the WBF female featherweight title, the WIBA super-bantamweight title and the Commonwealth female bantamweight title.

== Early life ==
O'Connell was born on 20 January 1983 in Adelaide, South Australia. At the age of two her father Kevin O'Connell died in a speedway accident. As a result of the loss of her father, her mother Lynda became deeply troubled and much of Shannon's early life was marred by abuse and drug-use. She took up boxing at the age of 20 to rehabilitate a back injury she suffered playing netball. Her first coach was Terry Fox, an Adelaide boxer from the 1970s that competed in speedway competitions against her father.

== Amateur career ==
O'Connell had a successful amateur career winning a national championship in her fifth fight. After a tournament in Tonga she met Brisbane trainer Chris McCullen, notably a trainer of former world champion Anthony Mundine and was persuaded to relocate to Queensland to continue her career.

== Professional career ==
O'Connell made her professional debut on 15 Dec 2011 winning by Technical knockout in round 3. In her second fight she fought for the Queensland state female bantamweight title and lost. After winning her next six fights (including the Queensland state female featherweight title) O'Connell fought South Korean Choi Hyun-mi for the WBA world female featherweight title, losing by unanimous decision to the hometown fighter in Seoul, South Korea.

On 29 June 2013 O'Connell travelled to Secunda South Africa, to face Gabisile Tshabalala for the vacant WBF female featherweight title. O'Connell won the fight via seventh round knockout winning her first world championship in just her 10th fight before stepping up in weight to take on the bigger and more experienced Diana Prazak for the WBC female super featherweight title. O'Connell lost the fight by 5th round TKO.

On 6 July 2014, O'Connell won the vacant WIBA world super bantamweight title over Brownyn Wilie by unanimous decision.

On 16 June 2017, O'Connell travelled to Argentina to take on experienced veteran Marcela Acuña for the IBF world female super bantamweight title. She lost by unanimous decision to the hometown fighter.

O'Connell defeated Kori Farr by unanimous decision to win the vacant Commonwealth female bantamweight title on 3 December 2020. She was named "Female Fighter of the Year" at The Inner Sanctum's 2021 Australian boxing awards.

In July 2022 she was named the mandatory challenger for the IBF world bantamweight title, held by fellow Australian Ebanie Bridges. The boxers met at First Direct Arena, Leeds, England on 10 December 2022 with Bridges retaining her title by stopping O'Connell in round eight.

On 4 October 2024, O'Connell was stopped in round four of a scheduled eight round contest against Mea Motu at The Star in Sydney, Australia.

== Personal life ==
O'Connell has three children and resides in Slacks Creek, south of Brisbane, Queensland. She was named the 2021 City of Logan "Sportswoman of the Year" and founded a gym in Slacks Creek named Shotgun Boxing and Fitness.

== Professional boxing record ==
35 fights	26 wins	8 losses
By knockout	13	4
By decision	13	4
Draws	1	

No.	Result	Record	Opponent	Type	Round, time	Date	Location	Notes
35	Win	26–8–1	(Australia) Jaki Toth	TKO	2 (8)	9 Aug 2025	Mansfield Tavern, Mansfield, Australia	
34	Win	25–8–1	(Australia) Jasmine Parr	SD	8	13 Dec 2024	The Star, Sydney, Australia	
33	Loss	24–8–1	(New Zealand) Mea Motu	TKO	4 (8) 1.02	4 Oct 2024	The Star, Sydney, Australia	
32	Win	24–7–1	(Thailand) Siriphon Chanbuala	TKO	2 (6) 0:52	11 May 2024	Greek Club, Brisbane, Australia	
31	Loss	23–7–1	(Australia) Ebanie Bridges	TKO	8 (10) 1:45	10 Dec 2022	(United Kingdom) First Direct Arena, Leeds, UK	For IBF female bantamweight World Title
30	Win	23–6–1	(Australia) Sarah Higginson	TKO	1 (6) 1:41	29 Jun 2022	Brisbane Convention & Exhibition Centre, South Brisbane, Queensland, Australia	
29	Win	22–6–1	(Australia) Taylah Robertson	SD	10 (10)	23 Oct 2021	Gold Coast Convention Centre, Broadbeach, Queensland, Australia	For Commonwealth Boxing Council Bantamweight Title
28	Win	21–6–1	(Australia) Cherneka Johnson	SD	10 (10)	13 Mar 2021	Bendigo Stadium, Bendigo, Victoria, Australia	For Vacant WBA Gold World Bantamweight Title
27	Win	20–6–1	(Australia) Kori Farr	UD	10 (10)	3 Dec 2020	Fortitude Music Hall, Fortitude Valley, Queensland, Australia	For Vacant Commonwealth Boxing Council Bantamweight Title
26	Win	19–6–1	(Australia) Kylie Fulmer	TKO	7 (8) 0:29	26 Aug 2020	Queensland Country Bank Stadium, Townsville, Queensland, Australia	For Vacant Australian Super Bantamweight Title
25	Win	18–6–1	(Australia) Bianca Elmir	SD	6 (6)	31 Aug 2019	Bendigo Stadium, Bendigo, Victoria, Australia	
24	Win	17–6–1	(Indonesia) Febriyanti Lubis	TKO	3 (6) 0:17	30 Mar 2019	Fortitude Stadium, Newstead, Queensland, Australia	
23	Win	16–6–1	(Thailand) Sumalee Tongpootorn	KO	1 (6) 1:40	13 Dec 2017	Brisbane Convention and Exhibition Centre, South Brisbane, Queensland, Australia	
22	Loss	15–6–1	(United States) Helen Joseph	KO	2 (8) 0:55	29 Jul 2017	The Famous Fortitude Gym, Newstead, Queensland, Australia	
21	Loss	15–5–1	(Argentina) Marcela Eliana Acuña	UD	10 (10)	16 Jun 2017	Ce.De.M. N° 2, Caseros, Buenos Aires, Argentina	IBF World female super bantamweight title
20	Win	15–4–1	(Argentina) Laura Soledad Griffa	UD	8 (8)	10 Dec 2016	Spark Arena, Auckland, New Zealand	WBO Asia Pacific Super Bantamweight Title
19	Win	14–4–1	(Hungary) Edina Kiss	UD	10 (10)	21 Oct 2016	Sleeman Sports Complex, Chandler, Queensland, Australia	WBC Silver female super bantamweight title
18	Win	13–4–1	(Japan) Kimika Miyoshi	UD	10 (10)	13 Aug 2016	Melbourne Park Function Centre, Melbourne, Australia	WBC Silver female super bantamweight title
17	Win	12–4–1	(Thailand) Tanwarat Saengiamjit	KO	6 (10) 00:57	9 Apr 2016	Warrnambool Stadium, Warrnambool, Victoria, Australia	vacant WBC Silver female super bantamweight title
16	Draw	11–4–1	(Colombia) Dayana Cordero	TD	3 (10)	21 November 2015	Bendigo Stadium, Bendigo, Victoria, Australia	For vacant WBC female silver featherweight title
15	Loss	11–4	(Canada) Sandy Tsagouris	UD	8	11 September 2015	Ricoh Coliseum, Toronto, Canada	
14	Win	11–3	(Thailand) Saranphat Sirisot	TKO	1 (6), 1:46	13 June 2015	Fortitude Stadium, Newstead, Queensland, Australia	
13	Win	10–3	(New Zealand) Bronwyn Wylie	UD	10	6 July 2014	Grand Star Receptions, Altona North, Victoria, Australia	Won vacant WIBA World super bantamweight title
12	Win	9–3	(New Zealand) Gentiane Lupi	MD	6	17 May 2014	PCYC, Nerang, Queensland, Australia	
11	Loss	8–3	(Australia) Diana Prazak	TKO	5 (10), 1:56	1 March 2014	The Melbourne Pavilion, Flemington, Victoria, Australia	For WBC World female super featherweight title
10	Win	8–2	(South Africa) Gabisile Tshabalala	KO	7 (10), 0:36	29 June 2013	Graceland Hotel Casino, Secunda, South Africa	Won vacant WBF female featherweight title
9	Loss	7–2	(South Korea) Choi Hyun-mi	UD	10	8 May 2013	KBS Sports World, Seoul, South Korea	For WBA World female featherweight title
8	Win	7–1	(Australia) Narelle Leahey	UD	6	4 April 2013	Southport RSL Club, Southport, Queensland, Australia	Won vacant Australia – Queensland State female featherweight title
7	Win	6–1	(Thailand) Pimchanok Ruamwong	TKO	3 (6), 0:36	24 October 2012	South Sydney Junior Rugby League Club, Kingsford, New South Wales, Australia	
6	Win	5–1	(Thailand) Naruemol Ubuabon	UD	8	24 August 2012	Mansfield Tavern, Mansfield, Queensland, Australia	
5	Win	4–1	(New Zealand) Michelle Preston	UD	6	29 June 2012	ABA Stadium, Auckland, New Zealand	
4	Win	3–1	(Thailand) Chuthaporn Pradissan	TKO	5 (6), 1:54	3 June 2012	Mansfield Tavern, Mansfield, Queensland, Australia	
3	Win	2–1	(Thailand) Pimchanok Ruamwong	TKO	3 (6), 0:30	24 March 2012	Irish Club Hotel, Toowoomba, Queensland, Australia	
2	Loss	1–1	(Australia) Sara George	UD	6	2 March 2012	Mansfield Tavern, Mansfield, Queensland, Australia	For vacant Australia – Queensland State female bantamweight title
1	Win	1–0	(Australia) Kelly O'Doherty	TKO	3 (6), 0:58	15 December 2011	Gambaro's Restaurant and Function Centre, Brisbane, Queensland, Australia	

Sporting positions
Regional boxing titles
Vacant Title last held by Sarah O'Connell	Australia – Queensland State female featherweight champion 4 April 2013 – May 2013; Fought for world title	Vacant Title next held by Rebecca Hawker
Vacant Title last held by Goda Dailydaite	WBF female featherweight champion 29 June 2013 – August 2013; Fought for world title	Vacant Title next held by Ina Menzer
Vacant Title last held by Jessica Rakoczy	WIBA super-bantamweight champion 6 July 2014 – 2015	Vacant Title next held by Gentiane Lupi
