= Rachel Ball =

English boxer (born 1991)

Personal information
- Nationality: English
- Born: 12 March 1991 (age 35) Walsall, West Midlands, England
- Height: 5 ft 9 in (175 cm)
- Weight: Super-bantamweight; Featherweight

Boxing career
- Stance: Orthodox

Boxing record
- Total fights: 8
- Wins: 7
- Win by KO: 0
- Losses: 1

Rachel Ball (born 12 March 1991) is an English professional boxer and former kickboxer who held the WBC female interim super-bantamweight title.

== Professional career ==
Ball made her professional debut on 17 December 2017, scoring a four-round points decision (PTS) victory against Claudia Ferenczi at the Banks's Stadium's Stadium Suite in Walsall. After three more PTS victories she suffered the first defeat of her career in March 2019, losing by majority decision (MD) over eight rounds against former European female super-featherweight champion Katharina Thanderz.

She bounced back from defeat with a ten-round PTS win against Bec Connolly in a final eliminator for the Commonwealth female super-featherweight title in November, followed by a victory against favoured opponent Shannon Courtenay in August 2020. After dropping Courtenay in the opening round with a left hook, Ball secured the win via PTS over eight rounds.

She next faced IBF female junior-bantamweight champion Jorgelina Guanini on 14 November 2020, with the vacant WBC female interim super-bantamweight title on the line. The bout served as part of the undercard for Katie Taylor's world title defence against Miriam Gutiérrez at The SSE Arena in London. Ball was originally scheduled to face Ebanie Bridges for the vacant WBA female bantamweight title, but Bridges was forced to withdraw after suffering an injury during training. The WBA title was set to still be up for grabs with the change of opponent, however, after Guanini failed to make the bantamweight limit at the pre-fight weigh-in, the WBA withdrew their sanction for the fight. The WBC agreed to allow the pair to fight for their interim super-bantamweight world title, but Guanini also failed to weigh inside the super-bantamweight limit, causing the title to be on the line for Ball only. Ball stayed behind her jab for the first three rounds, moving forward while fighting at range as Guanini closed the distance to fight on the inside with hooks. The pair engaged at close quarters in the fourth before Ball went back to fighting at range with combination punches in the fifth. Ball became more aggressive in the second half of the fight, landing straight right hands and hooks en route to a wide unanimous decision (UD) victory. Two judges scored the bout 99–91 and the third scored it 99–92 to award Ball the WBC female interim super-bantamweight title.

Ball was scheduled to fight Shannon Courtenay for the vacant WBA female bantamweight title on 10 April 2021 but withdrew due to illness.

== Professional boxing record ==
8 fights	7 wins	1 loss
By decision	7	1

No.	Result	Record	Opponent	Type	Round, time	Date	Location	Notes
8	Win	7–1	(Argentina) Jorgelina Guanini	UD	10	14 Nov 2020	(United Kingdom) The SSE Arena, London, England	Won vacant WBC female interim super-bantamweight title
7	Win	6–1	(United Kingdom) Shannon Courtenay	PTS	8	14 Aug 2020	(United Kingdom) Matchroom Headquarters, Brentwood, England	
6	Win	5–1	(United Kingdom) Bec Connolly	PTS	10	30 Nov 2019	(United Kingdom) Oasis Leisure Centre, Swindon, England	
5	Loss	4–1	(Norway) Katharina Thanderz	MD	8	2 Mar 2019	SØR Amfi, Arendal, Norway	
4	Win	4–0	(United Kingdom) Eftychia Kathopouli	PTS	6	20 Jul 2018	(United Kingdom) Stadium Suite at Banks's Stadium, Walsall, England	
3	Win	3–0	(Poland) Monika Antonik	PTS	4	4 May 2018	(United Kingdom) Town Hall, Walsall, England	
2	Win	2–0	(Poland) Bojana Libiszewska	PTS	6	10 Feb 2018	(United Kingdom) Stadium Suite at Banks's Stadium, Walsall, England	
1	Win	1–0	(Slovenia) Claudia Ferenczi	PTS	4	17 Dec 2017	(United Kingdom) Stadium Suite at Banks's Stadium, Walsall, England	

Sporting positions
World boxing titles
Vacant Title last held by Dina Thorslund	WBC super-bantamweight champion Interim title 14 November 2020 – present	Incumbent
