= Amy Timlin =

English boxer (born 1999)

Personal information
- Nationality: English
- Born: 17 December 1999 (age 26) Southam, Warwickshire, England
- Height: 165 cm (5 ft 5 in)
- Weight: Bantamweight, Super-bantamweight, Featherweight, Super-featherweight

Boxing career
- Stance: Orthodox

Boxing record
- Total fights: 7
- Wins: 5
- Losses: 1
- Draws: 1

Amy Timlin (born 17 December 1999) is an English former professional boxer who challenged for the Commonwealth and European female super-bantamweight titles. As an amateur she represented England at the AIBA Women's Youth World Boxing Championships.

== Career ==
A former British, Commonwealth, European and World kickboxing champion, Timlin switched to boxing in 2017 under the guidance of former World amateur champion Frankie Gavin.

She represented England in the 57 kg category at the 2017 AIBA Women's Youth World Boxing Championships in India losing in the preliminaries to Valeria Rodionova from Russia by unanimous decision.

Aged just 19, Timlin turned professional in 2019 making her pro-debut on 11 May that year, with a points victory over Roz Mari Silyanova in Walsall.

Having compiled a record of four wins from four fights, Timlin signed a management deal with Dave Coldwell in May 2020.

She battled to a split decision draw with Carly Skelly in a contest for the vacant Commonwealth female super-bantamweight title on the undercard of the Oleksandr Usyk vs Derek Chisora heavyweight clash at Wembley Arena on 31 October 2020.

In her next outing, Timlin lost her unbeaten record when she unsuccessfully challenged Mary Romero for the European super-bantamweight title in Barcelona, Spain, on 11 September 2021. Timlin suffered a cut near her left eye in the opening round and, after taking heavy punishment throughout the contest, retired on her stool before the start of round nine.

She returned to winning ways with a points win over Nicaraguan boxer Jamillette Janitza Vallejos in Bolton on 20 August 2022.

== Professional boxing record ==
7 fights	5 wins	1 loss
By decision	5	1
Draws	1	

No.	Result	Record	Opponent	Type	Round, time	Date	Location	Notes
7	Win	5–1–1	Jamillette Janitza Vallejos	PTS	4 (4)	20 August 2022	Bolton Whites Hotel, Bolton, England	
6	Loss	4–1–1	Mary Romero	RTD	8 (10)	11 September 2021	Pabellón de la Vall d'Hebron, Barcelona, Spain	Lost challenge for the European female super-bantamweight title
5	Draw	4–0–1	Carly Skelly	SD	10 (10)	31 October 2020	Wembley Arena, London, England	For the vacant Commonwealth female super-bantamweight title
4	Win	4–0	Klaudia Ferenczi	PTS	6 (6)	14 December 2019	Lion of Vienna Suite, Bolton Wanderers FC, Bolton, England	
3	Win	3–0	Bojana Libiszewska	PTS	4 (4)	12 October 2019	Kings Hall, Stoke-on-Trent, England	
2	Win	2–0	Sonia Klos	PTS	4 (4)	6 July 2019	Town Hall, Walsall, England	
1	Win	1–0	Roz Mari Silyanova	PTS	4 (4)	11 May 2019	Town Hall, Walsall, England	
