= Shannon Courtenay =

British boxer (born 1993)

Personal information
- Nickname: Baby Faced Assassin
- Born: 3 July 1993 (age 33) Abbots Langley, Hertfordshire, England
- Weight: Bantamweight; Super-bantamweight

Boxing career
- Stance: Orthodox

Boxing record
- Total fights: 15
- Wins: 11
- Win by KO: 4
- Losses: 3
- Draws: 1

Shannon Courtenay (born 3 July 1993) is a British professional boxer who held the WBA female bantamweight title between April and October 2021.

== Professional career ==
Courtenay made her professional debut on 23 March 2019, scoring a four-round points decision victory over Cristina Busuioc at the Copper Box Arena in London. The fight was televised live on Sky Sports as part of the undercard for Charlie Edwards' world title defense against Angel Moreno.

One month later she defeated Roz Mari Silyanova via four-round points decision on 23 April. The fight was streamed live on Sky Sports' Facebook page as part of the preliminary undercard for Dave Allen vs. Lucas Browne at The O2 Arena, London. In June, she stopped Valerija Sepetovska by technical knockout (TKO) at 1 minute 16 seconds in the second-round of a scheduled six-round bout held at the York Hall. Her next fight was a four-round points win over Jasmina Nad on 26 October as part of the undercard for the Josh Taylor vs. Regis Prograis world title fight, held at The O2 Arena. Courtenay's final fight of 2019 came on 19 December, scoring a fifth-round TKO over Buchra El Quaissi at the York Hall.

Her first fight of 2020 came against Rachel Ball on 14 August at the Matchroom Sport headquarters in Brentwood, Essex. In a fight which saw Courtenay dropped to the canvas by a left hook in the first round, she went on to suffer her first professional defeat, losing on points over eight rounds, with the referee scoring the bout 77–75.

She bounced back with a technical knockout victory against Dorota Norek on 4 December 2020, before facing Ebanie Bridges for the vacant WBA female bantamweight title. The bout took place on 10 April 2021 at the Copper Box Arena in London. In a fight which saw Courtenay hurt her opponent with a right hand in the fifth round while also causing Bridges' eye to close through swelling by the ninth, Courtenay emerged victorious via ten-round unanimous decision. Two judges scored the bout 98–92 and the third judge scored it 97–94.

In July 2021 it was announced that Courtenay would make the first defence of her title against Jamie Mitchell on 14 August that year at the Matchroom Sport Headquarters. The fight was postponed after Courtenay suffered an injury in training and was forced to withdraw. It was rescheduled for 9 October 2021 at Echo Arena in Liverpool . The day before the fight, Courtenay failed to make the required weight and was stripped of the title. The bout went with Mitchell, who was still able to claim the now vacant title, winning via majority decision.

=== Ring return ===
After almost two years of inactivity, Courtenay made her ring return on 19 October 2024 at the Copper Box Arena in London, England, losing a six-round contest on points 56–58 to Catherine Tacone Ramos.

She signed with Jake Paul's Most Valuable Promotions in July 2025. Courtenay made her first appearance for the promotion against Jessica Radtke Maltez at LIV Nightclub in Miami, Florida, USA, on 16 December 2025, as part of a three-fight card building up to the Jake Paul vs. Anthony Joshua bout set to take place three days later. She won the six round bout by unanimous decision.

Courtenay faced Sasha Booker at London Olympia on 5 April 2026. She won by third round technical knockout.

On 29 August 2026, Courtenay fought Ebonie Cotton at bp pulse LIVE in Birmingham with the bout ending in a 57-57 draw.

== Professional boxing record ==
15 fights	11 wins	3 losses
By knockout	4	0
By decision	7	3
Draws	1	

No.	Result	Record	Opponent	Type	Round, time	Date	Location	Notes
15	Draw	11–3–1	(United Kingdom) Ebonie Cotton	PTS	6	29 Aug 2026	(United Kingdom) bp pulse LIVE, Birmingham, England	
14	Win	11–3	(United Kingdom) Sasha Booker	TKO	3 (8), 1:57	5 Apr 2026	(United Kingdom) London Olympia, Kensington, England	
13	Win	10–3	(United States) Jessica Radtke Maltez	UD	6	16 Dec 2025	(United States) LIV Nightclub, Miami, Florida, USA	
12	Win	9–3	(United Kingdom) Bec Connolly	PTS	6	14 Mar 2025	(United Kingdom) Liverpool Olympia, Liverpool, England	
11	Loss	8–3	(Brazil) Catherine Tacone Ramos	PTS	6	19 Oct 2024	(United Kingdom) Copper Box Arena, London, England	
10	Win	8–2	(United Kingdom) Gemma Ruegg	PTS	8	10 Dec 2022	(United Kingdom) First Direct Arena, Leeds, England	
9	Loss	7–2	(United States) Jamie Mitchell	MD	10	9 Oct 2021	(United Kingdom) Echo Arena, Liverpool, England	
8	Win	7–1	(Australia) Ebanie Bridges	UD	10	10 Apr 2021	(United Kingdom) Copper Box Arena, London, England	Won vacant WBA female bantamweight title
7	Win	6–1	(Poland) Dorota Norek	TKO	7 (8), 1:35	4 Dec 2020	(United Kingdom) The SSE Arena, London, England	
6	Loss	5–1	(United Kingdom) Rachel Ball	PTS	8	14 Aug 2020	(United Kingdom) Matchroom Headquarters, Brentwood, England	
5	Win	5–0	(Spain) Buchra El Quaissi	TKO	5 (6), 1:20	19 Dec 2019	(United Kingdom) York Hall, London, England	
4	Win	4–0	(Serbia) Jasmina Nad	PTS	4	26 Oct 2019	(United Kingdom) The O2 Arena, London, England	
3	Win	3–0	(Latvia) Valerija Sepetovska	TKO	2 (6), 1:17	21 Jun 2019	(United Kingdom) York Hall, London, England	
2	Win	2–0	(Bulgaria) Roz Mari Silyanova	PTS	4	20 Apr 2019	(United Kingdom) The O2 Arena, London, England	
1	Win	1–0	(Romania) Cristina Busuioc	PTS	4	23 Mar 2019	(United Kingdom) Copper Box Arena, London, England	

Sporting positions
World boxing titles
Vacant Title last held by Mayerlin Rivas	WBA female bantamweight champion 10 April 2021 – 8 October 2021; Stripped	Vacant Title next held by Jamie Mitchell
