= Jorgelina Guanini =

Argentine boxer (born 1992)

Personal information
- Nickname: Jota
- Born: 31 May 1992 (age 34) Necochea, Buenos Aires, Argentina
- Height: 5 ft 2 1/2 in (159 cm)
- Weight: Super-flyweight; Bantamweight; Super-bantamweight; Featherweight

Boxing career
- Stance: Orthodox

Boxing record
- Total fights: 17
- Wins: 10
- Win by KO: 1
- Losses: 5
- Draws: 2

Jorgelina Guanini (born 31 May 1992) is an Argentine professional boxer who is a former IBF junior bantamweight champion.

== Professional career ==
Guanini made her professional debut on 19 September 2015, fighting to a split draw against Lilian Dolores Silva at Club Rivadavia in Necochea, Argentina. One judge scored the bout 39–37 in favour of Guanini, the second scored it 39.5–37.5 to Silva while the third scored it a draw at 39–39.

After compiling a record of 7–0–1, Guanini faced Davinia Perez (5–0) for the vacant WBC Silver female super bantamweight title. The bout took place on 7 October 2017 at Gallera del López Socas in Las Palmas, Spain. Guanini suffered the first defeat of her career via split decision. Two judges scored the bout 98–92 and 96–95 in favour of Perez while the third scored it 98–92 for Guanini. She bounced back from defeat with a ten-round majority decision victory over Julieta Cardozo (11–2) to capture the South American bantamweight title on 2 March 2018 at Club Deportivo Luján in San Salvador de Jujuy, Argentina. Two judges scored the bout in favour of Guanini with 96–95 and 98–97.5, while the third scored it a draw with 96–96.

Six months later, on 14 September 2018, she faced undefeated IBF female junior bantamweight champion Débora Dionicius (28–0) at Club Ferro Carril in Concordia, Argentina. Guanini captured the title by split decision to become a world champion in her eleventh professional fight, with two judges scoring the bout 96–94 in her favour while the third scored it 96–94 to Dionicius.

Guanini defended her title against fellow Argentine boxer Micaela Luján on 15 June 2019 with the fight ending in a majority draw with one judge scoring in favour of the challenger 96-94 and the other two unable to split the fighters with 95-95 scorecards.

Guanini was due to fight Rachel Ball for the vacant WBA female bantamweight World title in London, England, on 14 November 2020 but twice failed to make the required check weight despite going to the extreme measure of cutting her hair off. Subsequently the WBC added its interim female super-bantamweight World title to the contest but Guanini did not make that weight either although she was close enough to allow the bout to proceed with only Ball able to win the belt which she did by unanimous decision.

On 12 December 2021, Guanini lost a unanimous decision verdict to Jennifer Miranda in a contest for the vacant WBA female featherweight Intercontinental title in Madrid, Spain.

She suffered her third successive defeat when she lost to Ellie Scotney by unanimous decision while challenging for the vacant WBA female super-bantamweight Inntercontinental title on 12 February 2022.

Guanini finally got back to winning ways with an eight-round unanimous decision win over Stevi Levy on 1 April 2022 in a super-bantamweight bout held in Barcelona, Spain.

Guanini lost via unanimous decision to Raven Chapman in a contest for the vacant WBC female featherweight International title on the undercard of the Joe Joyce vs Joseph Parker clash at Manchester Arena in England on 24 September 2022.

== Professional boxing record ==
| 17 fights | 10 wins | 5 losses |
|---|---|---|
| By knockout | 1 | 0 |
| By decision | 9 | 5 |
| Draws | 2 | |

| No. | Result | Record | Opponent | Type | Round, time | Date | Location | Notes |
|---|---|---|---|---|---|---|---|---|
| 17 | Loss | 10–5–2 | (United Kingdom) Raven Chapman | UD | 10 | 24 Sep 2022 | (United Kingdom) Manchester Arena, Manchester, England | Lost challenge for vacant WBC female featherweight International title |
| 16 | Win | 10–4–2 | (United Kingdom) Stevi Levy | UD | 8 | 1 April 2022 | Palau Olímpic Vall d'Hebron, Barcelona, Spain | |
| 15 | Loss | 9–4–2 | (United Kingdom) Ellie Scotney | UD | 10 | 12 Feb 2022 | (United Kingdom) Alexandra Palace, Muswell Hill, England | Lost challenge for vacant WBA female super-bantamweight Intercontinental title |
| 14 | Loss | 9–3–2 | align=left (Spain) Jennifer Miranda | UD | 10 | 12 Dec 2021 | Polideportivo Magarinos, Madrid, Spain | Lost challenge for vacant WBA female featherweight Intercontinental title |
| 13 | Loss | 9–2–2 | (United Kingdom) Rachel Ball | UD | 10 | 14 Nov 2020 | (United Kingdom) The SSE Arena, London, England | |
| 12 | Draw | 9–1–2 | (Argentina) Micaela Luján | MD | 10 | 15 Jun 2019 | Estadio F.A.B., Buenos Aires, Argentina | Retained IBF female junior bantamweight title |
| 11 | Win | 9–1–1 | (Argentina) Débora Dionicius | SD | 10 | 14 Sep 2018 | Club Ferro Carril, Concordia, Argentina | Won IBF female junior bantamweight title |
| 10 | Win | 8–1–1 | (Argentina) Julieta Cardozo | MD | 10 | 2 Mar 2018 | Club Deportivo Luján, San Salvador de Jujuy, Argentina | Won South American female bantamweight title |
| 9 | Loss | 7–1–1 | (Spain) Davinia Perez | SD | 10 | 7 Oct 2017 | Gallera López del Socas, Las Palmas, Spain | For WBC Silver female super bantamweight title |
| 8 | Win | 7–0–1 | (Argentina) Makarena Gallastegui | UD | 6 | 21 Apr 2017 | Toro Club, Coronel Moldes, Argentina | |
| 7 | Win | 6–0–1 | (Argentina) Veronica Tesure | UD | 6 | 18 Feb 2017 | Club Rivadavia, Necochea, Argentina | |
| 6 | Win | 5–0–1 | (Argentina) Maria Sanchez | UD | 4 | 5 Nov 2016 | Club Union y Progreso, Tandil, Argentina | |
| 5 | Win | 4–0–1 | (Argentina) Lilian Silva | MD | 4 | 10 Sep 2016 | Club social y Deportivo Nahuel, Florencio Varela, Argentina | |
| 4 | Win | 3–0–1 | (Argentina) Valeria Almiron | UD | 4 | 9 Apr 2016 | Club Rivadavia, Necochea, Argentina | |
| 3 | Win | 2–0–1 | (Argentina) Alicia Machaca | TKO | 4 (4) | 12 Mar 2016 | Estadio F.A.B., Buenos Aires, Argentina | |
| 2 | Win | 1–0–1 | (Argentina) Noemi Pared | MD | 4 | 23 Jan 2016 | Asociación de Fomento, San Bernardo del Tuyú, Argentina | |
| 1 | Draw | 0–0–1 | (Argentina) Lilian Silva | SD | 4 | 19 Sep 2015 | Club Rivadavia, Necochea, Argentina | |
