= Castellbisbal =

- Municipality
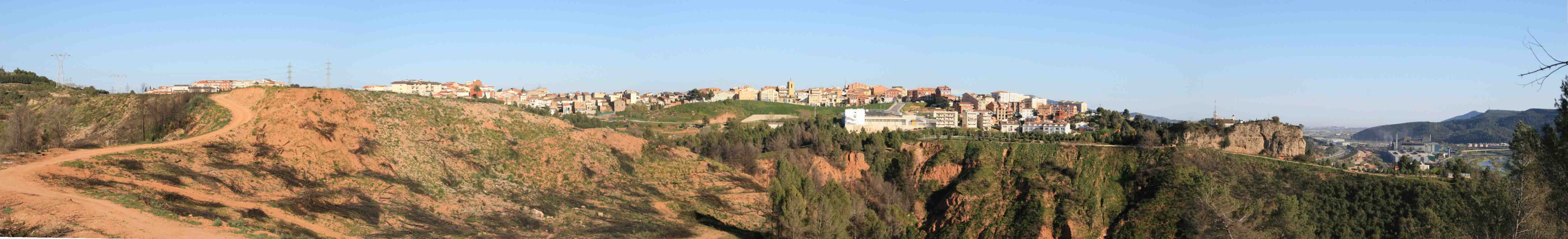

- Flag Coat of arms

- Location in Catalonia Castellbisbal (Spain)
- Coordinates: 41.476°N 1.983°E
- Country: Spain
- Autonomous community: Catalonia
- Province: Barcelona
- Comarca: Vallès Occidental

Government
  - Mayor: Joan Playà Guirado (2015)

Area
  - Total: 31.0 km^{2} (12.0 sq mi)
- Elevation: 132 m (433 ft)

Population (2025-01-01)
  - Total: 13,061
  - Density: 421/km^{2} (1,090/sq mi)
- Demonym: Castellbisbalenc
- Postal code: 08755
- Nominal GDP per capita: 86.700 € ($99,120)
- Website: www.castellbisbal.cat

Castellbisbal (Catalan pronunciation: [kəsˌteʎβizˈbal]) is a municipality in the comarca of Vallès Occidental in Catalonia. It is situated on the left bank of the Llobregat river at its confluence with the Rubí river. The town is served by the A-7 autopista, the main N-II road and the Renfe railway line R4 between Barcelona and València.

The remains of the Castellbisbal castle are visible on a hill near to the actual urban centre, while the surviving portion of the Pont del Diable ("Devil's Bridge") across the Llobregat river with its triumphal arch illustrates the historical importance of the town on the Via Augusta. The parish church of Sant Vincenç dates from the sixteenth century, while a Romanesque chapel (12th century) is in Can Pederol de Baix.

== Notable people ==
- Júlia Bartel (born 2004), footballer
