= Christy Martin vs. Deirdre Gogarty =

1996 women's boxing match

- Date: March 16, 1996
- Venue: MGM Grand Garden Arena in Paradise, Nevada

Tale of the tape
Boxer	Christy Martin	Deirdre Gogarty
Nickname	The Coal Miner's Daughter	Dangerous
Hometown	Bluefield, West Virginia, United States	Drogheda, Ireland
Pre-fight record	28–1–2 (23 KO)	8–3–2 (7 KO)
Height	5 ft 4 in (163 cm)	5 ft 5 in (165 cm)
Weight	135	130

Result
- Martin wins by 6 rounds unanimous decision (59–54, 60–53, 60–53)

Christy Martin vs. Deirdre Gogarty was a women's boxing match that took place on March 16, 1996, between American Christy Martin and Irishwoman Deirdre Gogarty. The contest was held at the MGM Grand Garden Arena in Paradise, Nevada, on the Las Vegas Strip, as part of the undercard of a pay-per-view championship match between Mike Tyson and Frank Bruno with 1.1 million buys. Surprising viewers with the participants' ferocity, strength, and technical skill, Martin vs. Gogarty is often called the fight that "put women's boxing on the map", or "the bout that made women's boxing". The fight was won by Martin, who was bleeding profusely, in a six-round unanimous decision, and led to her being the first female boxer featured on the cover of Sports Illustrated.

== Pre-fight ==
=== Christy Martin ===
Christy Renea Martin (née Salters) was born on June 12, 1968, in Mullens, West Virginia, the daughter and granddaughter of coal miners. As a freshman basketball player at Concord College in 1987, Martin began boxing in amateur contests on a dare, easily taking home the $1,000 prize. She won six Toughwoman fight nights, before turning professional in 1989.

In 1991, she started training with her future husband, Jim Martin, an ex-fighter who was 25 years her senior. She had two wins and one draw before her first loss to Andrea DeShong, who was unbeaten, on November 4, 1989, in Bristol, Tennessee. Determined to avenge the loss, Martin trained hard and went on to win their April 1990 rematch by a unanimous decision with a five-point advantage.

Martin went on to have a string of knockout wins, as she perfected her straight-right punch and took on novice boxers, all while wearing her trademark pink satin trunks. Her impressive record caught the attention of Don King, the world-famous boxing promoter. He signed Martin in October 1993 following her third-round knockout win against Beverly Szymanski, making Martin the first female boxer to sign with King.

King immediately started slotting Martin onto fight cards he had running in Las Vegas. On January 29, 1994, she appeared on the undercard of a fight between Julio César Chávez and Frankie Randall at the MGM Grand Hotel, knocking out Susie "Sluggin'" Melton 40 seconds into their first round. On May 7, 1994, she appeared on the undercard of the rematch between Chavez and Randall, taking on Mexican boxer Laura Serrano, who was making her US debut. After six rounds of nonstop intensity, the bout was judged a unanimous draw. In February 1996, Christy Martin had her first nationally televised boxing match on the Showtime network.

=== Deirdre Gogarty ===
Deirdre Mary Gogarty was born on November 10, 1969, in Drogheda, County Louth, Ireland, the daughter of dentists. She moved to Dublin and eventually started training with Pat McCormack, a former British light welterweight champion. Her professional debut was a six-round bout against Anne-Marie Griffin in Limerick on June 30, 1991. Gogarty won on points in the fight, which was actually on a kickboxing fight card. Despite her promising start, the Irish Boxing Union (IBU) refused to provide her with a license to compete professionally.

In April 1992, Gogarty fought an underground match in England, facing Jane Johnson in the basement of the Park Tavern Pub in Leeds. Gogarty won by a TKO in round four of a six-round match. McCormack introduced her to Paddy Sower, a British referee and former boxer. Impressed with her potential, Sower convinced Beau Willford, an American former heavyweight boxer who used to practice fighting with Muhammad Ali, to train her at his gym in Lafayette, Louisiana.

In January 1993, Gogarty had her US debut against Stacey Prestage in Kansas City, Missouri, which resulted in a technical draw due to a headbutt. She went on to have four wins before a rematch with Prestage the following August, which ended once again in a draw after six rounds. On November 23, 1993, Gogarty had her first world championship try, facing Prestage for a third time, for the inaugural Women's International Boxing Federation's world lightweight title. After ten grueling rounds, Gogarty was handed her first loss, by decision.

Gogarty had a second try for the WIBF world lightweight title on April 20, 1995, at the Aladdin Hotel in Las Vegas, facing Laura Serrano of Mexico, who had drawn against Christy Martin in her own US debut. It was the main event in a historic all-female fight card featuring five ten-round championship matches in boxing, as well as an exhibition match in kickboxing. The result was a loss for Gogarty as her stamina was pushed to the limit, and the match was stopped in the seventh round as a TKO. Although the fight was well received by an enthusiastic crowd, it was not broadcast as originally planned due to the Oklahoma City bombing which took place the day before.

== The fight ==
The March 16, 1996, fight between Christy Martin and Deirdre Gogarty at the MGM Grand Garden Arena was an unexpected sensation. Gogarty accepted the match with only ten days' notice, in spite of a fifteen-pound weight advantage to Martin. It was televised on Showtime pay-per-view on the undercard of Mike Tyson's championship bout against Frank Bruno for the WBC heavyweight title, with media from around the world attending to report on Tyson's comeback. The much-hyped boxing extravaganza was seen by more than 1.1 million viewers, at the time the second-most-watched card in the history of pay-per-view.

Scheduled on the early part of the card that evening, the crowd was nonetheless at near capacity, as Martin vs. Gogarty was the only female match in an otherwise all-male lineup. According to Martin, celebrities including Magic Johnson and other basketball and football stars were among the spectators in the "jam-packed" arena. The contest's referee was the actor and referee, Filipino Carlos Padilla Jr. Gogarty wore white satin trunks with a green stripe as a nod to her Irish roots, while Martin wore her signature pink.

It was an action-packed contest that went on for six rounds. According to The Irish Times, "It took five, maybe 10, seconds for the beery, testosterone charged crowd in the MGM Garden to realise they weren't watching a novelty act". Martin came out aggressively as soon as the bell rang, while Gogarty responded with an "equally hard-hitting" series of combinations. They ran even toward the end of the first round, but in the second round, Martin stunned and floored Gogarty with a straight right 30 seconds in. Gogarty got up and kept fighting, impressing the announcers and fans with her perseverance, skill, and "some astonishingly heavy blows". Martin sought to end the match then and there by cornering her with a barrage of blows, but Gogarty caught Martin on the nose, which started bleeding, and later turned out to be broken. Despite the bloody nose, Martin was still the aggressor, unleashing massive combinations in the fourth round, while Gogarty continued to fight back and kept her feet moving. In the fifth round, Gogarty landed a straight right on Martin, engaging her in a brutal exchange against the ropes, but Martin fought back and pushed herself to the center of the ring. The sixth and final round continued similarly, with Martin throwing lefts and rights up until the bell, as the crowd cheered, and the on-air announcer praised both boxers' "brilliant" heart.

In the end, Gogarty's come-from-behind effort was not enough, as Martin was deemed the winner by the judges' unanimous decision, with a comfortable lead in points based on her shot rate, which was consistently on-target with both hands, and range. Journalist Tom Humphries wrote, "The mixture of ferocity and serious boxing skills left the most chauvinistic ticket holders gape mouthed...Aside from the main event, Tyson and Bruno, this was the match which most thoroughly and genuinely engaged the passions of the crowd."

== Aftermath ==
Given Mike Tyson's easy victory over Frank Bruno for the WBC heavyweight title, the most talked-about "fight of the night" was the "girl fight", which had offered "more action and better boxing", according to Sports Illustrated. The image of Christy Martin, flushed with exertion but triumphant, even as "she bled like a stuck pig" in the words of her trainer-husband, captured the attention of the media and won her fans worldwide. Demonstrating that women could box aggressively with courage, strength, and technical skill, Christy Martin vs. Deirdre Gogarty came to be called the fight that "put women's boxing on the map", a seminal moment that contributed significantly to its growth as a sport. Financially, the Martin vs. Gogarty fight paid dividends for Don King, piqued the interest of other boxing promoters such as Bob Arum, and generated opportunities for other women boxers, resulting in what author Malissa Smith calls the "pink rush" into the boxing ring.

=== Christy Martin ===
Impressed with her performance, the WBC awarded Martin the nominal title of Women's Lightweight Champion, although the official title belts were not offered to female boxers until 2005. Two weeks after the fight, Martin was featured in Time magazine as "Belle of the Brawl". On April 15, 1996, Martin became the first female boxer to appear on the cover of Sports Illustrated; the headline read, "The Lady Is a Champ". Appearing on numerous TV shows such as The Today Show, Primetime Live, Inside Edition, she became a widely recognized sports personality in her own right.

Following her win against Gogarty, Martin had a record of 29 wins, two draws, and only one loss. Christy Martin went on to become one of the most successful women boxers in history, winning the WBC super welterweight championship in 2009, and finishing with a record of 49 wins, 7 losses and 3 draws in 59 professional boxing fights, with 31 wins by knockout. Despite her professional triumphs, Martin later revealed that she had suffered years of abuse during her marriage to Jim Martin, who was sentenced to 25 years in prison after nearly killing her on November 23, 2010. Martin survived, and was inducted into the International Women's Boxing Hall of Fame in 2014, and into the International Boxing Hall of Fame in 2020. In 2017, Christy Martin married her former boxing rival Lisa Holewyne. In 2021, Martin was featured in the Netflix documentary Untold: Deal With the Devil, and her autobiography, Fighting for Survival: My Journey Through Boxing Fame, Abuse, Murder and Resurrection, was released on June 22, 2022.

=== Deirdre Gogarty ===
Although Tyson and Bruno split a purse worth $36 million, the women who boxed on the undercard took home considerably less: Christy Martin was paid $15,000, while Deirdre Gogarty ended up with only $3,000. Although Gogarty did start to get paid more after her fight with Martin, she did not get as many big matchups as she had hoped for.

On March 2, 1997, Gogarty finally won the WIBF featherweight championship on her third try for a title after defeating Bonnie Canino in New Orleans, becoming Ireland's first female world boxing champion. However, she did not receive the $12,500 purse she was owed, after the promoter absconded without paying anyone. She stopped competing the following year due to injury, officially retiring from boxing in 2004 with a 16–5–2 record.

After winning the title in 1997, Gogarty received a fan letter from 11-year-old Katie Taylor, who wrote that she hoped to represent Ireland in the Olympics someday. Gogarty's autobiography, My Call to the Ring: A Memoir of a Girl Who Yearns to Box, was released in 2012, one day before Taylor won the gold medal in lightweight boxing at the London 2012 Olympic Games; it was the first time women's boxing was included as an official Olympic sport. In 2015, Gogarty was inducted into the International Women's Boxing Hall of Fame, one year after Martin.
