= Lucia Rijker =

Dutch boxer (born 1967)

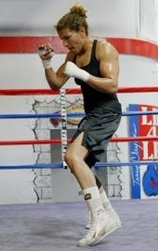
- Rijker in 2005
- Born: December 6, 1967 (age 58); Amsterdam, Netherlands
- Nickname: The Dutch Destroyer; Lady Tyson
- Height: 1.68 m (5 ft 6 in)
- Weight: 63.5 kg (140 lb)
- Style: Orthodox

Professional boxing record
- Total: 17
- Wins: 17
- By knockout: 14
- Losses: 0

Kickboxing record
- Total: 36
- Wins: 35
- By knockout: 25
- Draws: 1

Lucia Frederica Rijker (Dutch pronunciation: [ˈlysijaː ˈrɛikər]; born December 6, 1967) is a Dutch professional boxer, kickboxer, and actress.

Rijker was sometimes dubbed by the press "The Most Dangerous Woman in the World".

== Early career ==
Rijker was born in Amsterdam to a Surinamese father and a Dutch mother. She speaks four languages and is a Buddhist, dedicating time daily to meditation and chanting.

Rijker started her martial arts career at the early age of six, when she began training in judo. A year later, she was part of the Dutch National Softball Team. At fourteen, after picking up fencing a year earlier, Lucia became the Netherlands Junior Champion of that sport. When she was fifteen she began kickboxing and knocked out the reigning American kickboxing champion, Lily Rodriguez. Rijker eventually amassed a 36-0 (25 KO) record as a kickboxer, and won four different world titles. Her only defeat in a kickboxing ring was in an exhibition match at Sporthallen Zuid in Amsterdam in October 1994, when she fought male Muay Thai fighter Somchai Jaidee, who knocked her out in the second round.

== Career change ==
After winning her first 14 fights, but failing to secure a match with Christy Martin, Rijker stepped away from boxing in 1999 to pursue a career in Hollywood. She appeared as Billie 'The Blue Bear' Osterman in 2004's Oscar-winning, female boxer-based film Million Dollar Baby and was featured in the documentary film Shadow Boxers. She played a minor role in Rollerball and had a brief cameo in the season 2 finale of The L Word as Dana's trainer. She returned to The L Word in Season 5 as Dusty, Helena's cellmate in prison. Rijker played a Romulan communications officer in the film Star Trek.

== Return to the ring ==
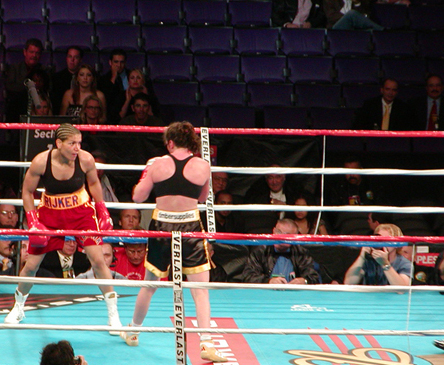
Lucia Rijker and Jane Couch boxing, 2003

She returned to the ring in February 2002, and later beat Jane Couch (20-4 going in; 25-6 as of December 2004) by decision (eight rounds) on June 21, 2003 for her 16th win. Win number 17 was a ten-round decision over "Sun shine” Fettkether on May 20, 2004.

Rijker and Christy Martin were scheduled to fight on July 30, 2005 at the Mandalay Bay in Las Vegas. Major U.S. promoter Bob Arum (Top Rank Boxing's head) had made their match the main event of a card (with otherwise male boxing matches) called "Million Dollar Lady". Each woman was guaranteed $250,000 (U.S.), with the winner receiving an extra $750,000; however, on July 20, it was announced that she had ruptured an Achilles tendon while training for the fight; recovery time was estimated to be 4–7 months. The match was ultimately cancelled.

In 2006, Rijker stated that although not retired as a professional boxer, she would only consider one more fight - a bout with Laila Ali.

== Boxing records ==
As of February 2007, she was undefeated in the ring; her boxing record is 17-0 (14 K.O.'s).

Rijker has been on the cover of numerous magazines including Inside Kung Fu. As a professional boxer, she has won the WIBF Welterweight Title, and has beaten name fighters such as Marcela Acuña (5th-round K.O.; Acuña was 0-1 going into the fight, and retired with a record of 42-6-1), and Deborah "Sunshine" Fettkether (10th-round decision; Fettkether was 8-4-3 going in).

== Current activities ==
For several years, Rijker has been training under the world-famous boxing coach Freddie Roach. In 2012, she was hired as a striking coach to former UFC Champion Ronda Rousey.

Rijker once again gained media attention in June 2013, when she worked in the corner of female boxing challenger Diana Prazak in her WBC super featherweight title bout against local champion Frida Wallberg in Stockholm, Sweden. Prazak knocked Wallberg down twice in the eighth round prompting the referee to stop the fight. After a brief check by the ringside doctor, Wallberg started to collapse in her corner. Rijker immediately realized the seriousness of the situation and called the doctor back to the ring while she and Prazak assisted Wallberg. Wallberg had to be carried from the ring on a stretcher to hospital and underwent surgery with a cerebral hemorrhage. This event sparked controversy about the level of the provided medical attention and reignited debates about banning boxing in Sweden.

In 2014, Rijker was part of the inaugural class of the International Women's Boxing Hall of Fame in Fort Lauderdale, Florida.

In 2019, Rijker became one of the first three women boxers (and the first Dutch woman boxer) elected to the International Boxing Hall of Fame; 2019 was the first year that women were on the ballot.

In 2017, Rijker hosted the Dutch adaptation of Jamie's Dream School; as well as in 2018, 2019, and 2020.

She continues giving lectures and seminars to athletes and people from all walks of life to perform their best, while she maintains her fitness.

== Championships and accomplishments ==
=== Kickboxing ===
- 1988–1989 — IWBA Women's Boxing World Champion
- 1985–1994 — WKA Women's Division World Champion
- 1989–1994 — ISKA Women's Division World Champion

=== Boxing ===
- 1997 - WIBF Super Lightweight World Champion
- 1998 - WIBO Junior Welterweight World Champion
- 1997–1998 — European WIBF Boxing Champion

== Kickboxing record ==
Kickboxing record
37 wins (25 KOs), 0 losses, 1 draws
Date	Result	Opponent	Event	Location	Method	Round	Time	Record
1994-04-30	Win	(England) Sandra Moore	K-1 Grand Prix '94	Tokyo, Japan	Decision (unanimous)	5	3:00	
1993-12-19	Win	(Japan) Yoriko Okamoto	K-2 Grand Prix '93	Tokyo, Japan	TKO (right low kick)	2	0:38	
1993-09-04	Win	(Japan) Kyoko Kamikaze	K-1 Illusion	Tokyo, Japan	TKO	2	0:44	
1993-02-14	Win	(United States) Alene Sanchez	ISKA Fightnight	Amsterdam, Netherlands	TKO	2	1.05	
1992-05-17	Win	(England) Michele Aboro		Hamburg, Germany	TKO			
1992-00-00	Win	(Canada) Kathy Petereit		Amsterdam, Netherlands	TKO	1		
1991-10-06	Win	(England) Sandra Moore			Decision	5	3:00	
Full contact title.
1991-06-00	Win	(England) Michele Aboro		Oldham, England	TKO	1		
IMTF world lightweight title.
1990-11-18	Win	(England) Maxine Adams			KO	1		
1989-10-08	Win	(Germany) Paola Zarbo		Amsterdam, Netherlands	KO	1		
1988-10-00	Win	(Republic of Ireland) Ruth O'Hara		Japan				
1988-02-14	Win	(France) Daniëlle Roccard		Arnhem, Netherlands	TKO	1	0:15	
1987-11-08	Win	(France) Valérie Hénin		Amsterdam, Netherlands	TKO	4		
World kickboxing title.
0000-00-00	Win	(United States) Bonnie Canino			Decision	7	2:00	
1987-04-26	Win	(England) Anne Holmes		Amsterdam, Netherlands	TKO	1	0:30	
1985-10-06	Win	(United States) Cheryl Wheeler		Amsterdam, Netherlands	Decision (unanimous)	7	2:00	
World full contact title.
1985-05-26	Win	(France) Nancy Vesula		Amsterdam, Netherlands	TKO	2		
European title.
1985-03-04	Win	(France) Ermelinda Fernandez		Clermont-Ferrand, France	KO	2		
1984-01-15	Win	(United States) Lilly Rodriuez		Amsterdam, Netherlands	KO (low kick)	1	0:30	6-0-1
Retains the ISKA World Super Lightweight (−62.3 kg/137 lb) Full Contact Championship.
1983-09-04	Win	(Spain) Linda Lladossa		Amsterdam, Netherlands	Decision (unanimous)			
1983-06-00	Win	(France) Catherine Zanzouri		Paris, France	KO	3		
1983-00-00	Win	(France) Nancy Joseph		Amsterdam, Netherlands	TKO (doctor stoppage)	1		
1983-06-29	Draw	(Spain) Linda Lladossa		Amsterdam, Netherlands	Draw			
1982-11-04	Win	(Netherlands) Sandra Oostendorp		Amsterdam, Netherlands				
Legend: Win Loss Draw/No contest Notes

Exhibition Kickboxing record
0 wins, 1 loss (1 KO)
Date	Result	Opponent	Event	Location	Method	Round	Time	Record
1993-10-17	Loss	(Thailand) Somchai Jaidee		Amsterdam, Netherlands	KO	2		0–1
Legend: Win Loss Draw/No contest Notes

== Professional boxing record ==
17 Fights, 17 Wins (14 KO's), 0 Losses
No.	Result	Record	Opponent	Type	Round	Date	Location	Notes
17	Win	17–0	(United States) Deborah Fettkether	UD	10	May 20, 2004	(Netherlands) Amsterdam	
16	Win	16–0	(United Kingdom) Jane Couch	UD	8	June 21, 2003	(United States) Los Angeles, CA	
15	Win	15–0	(United States) Carla Witherspoon	TKO	4	February 16, 2002	(United States) Ucansville, CT	
14	Win	14–0	(Canada) Diana Dutra	TKO	3	August 28, 1999	(United States) Las Vegas, NV	
13	Win	13–0	(United States) Britt van Buskirk	TKO	3	April 18, 1999	(United States) Miami, FL	
12	Win	12–0	(Argentina) Marcela Acuña	KO	5	September 25, 1998	(United States) Mashantucket, CT	
11	Win	11–0	(United States) Lisa Ested	TKO	4	June 25, 1998	(United States) Mashantucket, CT	
10	Win	10–0	(United States) Mary Ann Almager	TKO	1	March 23, 1998	(United States) Mashantucket, CT	
9	Win	9–0	(Germany) Jeanette Witte	TKO	3	November 20, 1997	(United States) Los Angeles, CA	
8	Win	8–0	(United States) Andrea DeShong	TKO	3	September 13, 1997	(United States) Las Vegas, NV	
7	Win	7–0	(United States) Gwen Smith	TKO	4	June 14, 1997	(United States) Biloxi, MS	
6	Win	6–0	(United States) Dora Webber	UD	6	May 14, 1997	(United States) Mashantucket, CT	
5	Win	5–0	(United States) Chevelle Hallback	TKO	5	Mar 22, 1997	(United States) Corpus Christi, TX	
4	Win	4–0	(Netherlands) Irma Verhoef	TKO	4	Feb 4, 1997	(Netherlands) Rotterdam	
3	Win	3–0	(Hungary) Zsuzsanna Szuknai	TKO	1	December 17, 1997	(Netherlands) Rotterdam	
2	Win	2–0	(United States) Kelly Jacobs	TKO	1	December 6, 1996	(United States) Reno, NV	
1	Win	1–0	(United States) Melinda Robinson	KO	1	March 23, 1996	(United States) Los Angeles, CA	
