= Christy (2025 American film) =

Biographical film by David Michôd

- Theatrical release poster
- Directed by: David Michôd
- Screenplay by: Mirrah Foulkes; David Michôd
- Story by: Katherine Fugate
- Produced by: Kerry Kohansky-Roberts; Teddy Schwarzman; Brent Stiefel; Justin Lothrop; David Michôd; Sydney Sweeney
- Starring: Sydney Sweeney; Ben Foster; Merritt Wever; Katy O'Brian
- Cinematography: Germain McMicking
- Edited by: Matt Villa
- Music by: Antony Partos
- Production companies: Black Bear Pictures; Anonymous Content; Votiv Films; Yoki, Inc.; Fifty-Fifty Films
- Distributed by: Black Bear Pictures
- Release dates: September 5, 2025 (TIFF); November 7, 2025 (United States)
- Running time: 135 minutes
- Country: United States
- Language: English
- Budget: $15 million
- Box office: $2.3 million

Christy is a 2025 American biographical sports drama film directed by David Michôd, written by Michôd and Mirrah Foulkes, and starring Sydney Sweeney, Ben Foster, Merritt Wever, Katy O'Brian, Ethan Embry, and Chad L. Coleman. The film chronicles the rise of former professional boxer Christy Martin (Sweeney) to becoming America's best-known female boxer in the 1990s, and later her coach-turned-husband's 2010 attempted murder of her.

The film had its world premiere at the 2025 Toronto International Film Festival on September 5, 2025, in the Special Presentations section. It was released theatrically on November 7, 2025, by Black Bear Pictures, earning $1.3 million in its opening weekend in the United States, which Box Office Mojo classified as one of the top 12 worst openings for a new release that opened on over 2,000 screens. As a result, the film has been considered a box-office bomb. It opened at #11 at the box office, outside the top ten, and fell to #23 by its second week. The film received mixed reviews from critics, though the performances were praised, in particular Sweeney.

== Plot ==
In 1989 Itmann, West Virginia, college basketball player Christy Salters enters a local female boxing competition and wins. Impressed by her skills, local boxing coach James Martin contacts Christy and offers to coach her. Christy is initially ambivalent about pursuing boxing, but her raw talent and success at the sport motivate her to continue pursuing it. Meanwhile, her secret relationship with her high-school girlfriend, Rosie, falls apart, and Christy's homophobic mother, Joyce, is troubled by rumors that Christy is a lesbian, causing tension within the family.

By 1995, Christy has moved to Apopka, Florida, with James and opened a boxing gym. James exhibits controlling behavior, but their relationship has become sexual. The couple marry, which pleases Christy's family, particularly Joyce. James, acting as Christy's coach and manager, fails to keep promises to facilitate career connections for her, but the couple manage to arrange a meeting with Don King, a prolific boxing promoter with whom she signs a contract. A series of successes follow, including a win against Lisa Holewyne, an out lesbian whose sexuality Christy publicly mocks.

Christy's rise to fame continues, affording her and James a comfortable life. In a career high, Christy defeats Deirdre Gogarty in a Las Vegas match at the MGM Grand, marking the first female boxing competition to be shown on pay-per-view television. Her profile continues to rise as she becomes the first female boxer on the cover of Sports Illustrated. Don warns Christy about her bravado and patronizing attitude toward her competitors, fearing it may lead to her downfall.

In 2003, at James's suggestion, Christy is committed to fight Laila Ali, feigning a higher weight class to do so. James hires Lisa to help train her, but Christy loses to Ali. Meanwhile, James's controlling nature has progressed to physical abuse, which is suspected by Jeff, Christy's ringside support and a trainer at her and James's gym. The couple also develop a codependent cocaine addiction. Christy confides in her mother about James's abuse and manipulation, which includes forcing Christy to engage in filmed sex acts, but Joyce dismisses it as drug-induced paranoia.

By 2010, Christy's and James's relationship has significantly deteriorated. Jeff tells Christy that James has been stealing money from her for years, leading to a violent confrontation. Determined to leave James, Christy seeks support from Rosie, whom she reconnects with, only to find herself stalked by James. James sends clips from the sex tapes he has made with Christy to her peers and family members before claiming Christy has left him for Rosie, publicly outing her. A defiant Christy returns to their home, where James stabs her multiple times and flays her calf muscle before shooting Christy in the chest with a pistol. Christy manages to flee the house and is saved by a passerby who rushes her to a hospital.

At the hospital, Joyce blames Rosie for James's attack. During her convalescence, Christy is visited by Lisa, to whom she apologizes for her previous hostility, and the two reconcile. Christy returns to her gym, where she is embraced by Jeff and the other staff. Christy resumes boxing without James, who is sentenced to 25 years in prison for attempted second-degree murder. Intertitles reveal that Christy and Lisa married in 2017, and that Christy has become an advocate for victims of domestic violence.

== Cast ==
- Sydney Sweeney as Christy Salters Martin
- Ben Foster as James V. Martin, Christy's coach turned abusive husband
- Merritt Wever as Joyce Salters, Christy's mother
- Katy O'Brian as Lisa Holewyne, a boxing adversary and Christy's love interest later future wife
- Ethan Embry as John Salters, Christy's father
- Coleman Pedigo as Randy Salters, Christy's younger brother
- Jess Gabor as Rosie (based on Sherry Lusk), Christy's high school girlfriend
- Chad L. Coleman as Don King, a prolific boxing promoter
- Tony Cavalero as James Maloney
- Bill Kelly as Larry Carrier, a Tennessee promoter who first discovers Christy
- Bryan Hibbard as Big Jeff, Christy's friend and ringside support team-member
- Gilbert Cruz as Miguel Díaz, Christy's cutman and a trainer
- Naomi Graham as Laila Ali
- James Self as Coach
- Adrian Lockett as Mike Tyson
- Stephanie Baur as Deirdre Gogarty

== Production ==
=== Development ===
In May 2024, it was announced that a biographical film about the former professional boxer Christy Martin was in production, with David Michôd set to direct, and a screenplay written by Michôd and Mirrah Foulkes.

In May 2024, it was announced that the film was being introduced to international buyers at the Marché du Film at the 2024 Cannes Film Festival. The film was expected to begin principal photography in the fall of 2024. It was produced by Kerry Kohansky-Roberts, David Michôd, Justin Lothrop, Brent Stiefel, Sydney Sweeney, and Teddy Schwarzman, and executive-produced by Michael Heimler, John Friedberg, Mirrah Foulkes, Brad Zimmerman, David Levine, Ryan Schwartz, and Nick Shumaker. Production companies involved with the film are Anonymous Content, Yoki, Inc., Votiv, Fifty-Fifty Films, and Black Bear Pictures.

=== Casting ===
Christy is played by Sydney Sweeney. In September 2024, it was announced that Ben Foster, Merritt Wever, Katy O'Brian, Ethan Embry, Jess Gabor, and Chad L. Coleman had joined the cast.

To prepare for the role, Sweeney trained extensively in boxing and weightlifting, gaining over 30 pounds (14 kg) during the process. She also performed her own stunts in the film, refusing to use a stunt double for the boxing sequences.

=== Filming ===
Principal photography began by September 30, 2024, in North Carolina, and wrapped on November 15, 2024. Filming occurred in the cities of Gastonia, Charlotte, and the Lake Norman area. Martin was involved in the making of the film and spent some time on the set.

== Music ==
Antony Partos composed the score for the film.

== Release ==
Christy had its world premiere at the 2025 Toronto International Film Festival on September 5, 2025. Before its Toronto premiere, Black Bear Pictures was announced to be distributing the film through its U.S. division, releasing it on November 7, 2025.

The film screened in the Icon section of the 2025 Stockholm International Film Festival on November 5, 2025.

=== Home media ===
The film was released digitally on December 9, 2025, and was released by Universal Pictures Home Entertainment on Blu-ray and DVD on April 21, 2026.

== Reception ==
=== Box office ===
In its opening weekend in the United States, Christy earned $1.3 million, which Box Office Mojo classified as one of the top 12 worst openings for a new release that opened on over 2,000 screens. In its second weekend, the film grossed $108,487, declining by 91.7% and setting a new record for biggest second weekend drop.

=== Critical response ===
On the review aggregator website Rotten Tomatoes, 66% of 207 critics' reviews are positive, with an average rating of 6.3/10. The website's consensus reads: "While Christy falters in tonal cohesion and emotional impact, it remains a compelling showcase for Sydney Sweeney's transformative performance, grounding a mythic genre in raw, personal storytelling." Metacritic, which uses a weighted average, assigned the film a score of 58 out of 100, based on 38 critics, indicating "mixed or average" reviews. Audiences polled by CinemaScore gave the film an average grade of "B+" on an A+ to F scale.

After its festival debut, Glenn Garner for Deadline Hollywood summarized reactions, writing, "Some critics have praised Sweeney for disappearing into the role of the professional boxer, others say that’s all the movie has going for it." Sonia Rao criticized the screenplay in a 2 out of 4 star review for The Washington Post, calling Christy a "run-of-the-mill biopic that suffers from its inability to convey what truly sets Christy’s narrative apart from the rest." In a mixed review for Slant Magazine, Marshall Shaffer wrote that the film "lulls us into complacency by deviating little from the standard inspirational sports-movie playbook. But nestled in the early scenes of the eponymous phenom’s rise are the seeds of struggle that will bloom in the film’s more effective back as her fighting career begins to plateau." Robert Abele of the Los Angeles Times lauded Sweeney's performance but wrote that the film "screams for a treatment grittier than the slick melodrama we’ve been given. It’s all highlights and lowlights, rarely interested in the in-between stuff that makes watching all the rounds of a bout so necessary to appreciating what it means to survive on the canvas."

Barry Hertz of The Globe and Mail praised the lead performances by Sweeney and Foster but conceded that "too much of director David Michôd’s film fails to deliver as much as blood, sweat and tears as Sweeney herself offers, the familiar beats and boundaries of a sports biopic constantly forcing its star to bounce against the ropes of convention." Dan Jolin of Time Out awarded the film four out of five stars, praising both the lead and supporting performances. Lisa Kennedy of The New York Times praised Sweeney's lead performance, writing that she "settles into Christy’s heft but never overthinks her character, whose innate skills are decades ahead of her self-esteem." The Seattle Times's Jocelyn Noveck wrote, "The mashup of genres may feel a bit tonally rough, but it ultimately works, not least because of its unifying factor: Sweeney, who imbues her no-holds-barred portrayal of Martin with both sweetness and rage, with brio and real vulnerability."

=== Accolades ===
Award	Date of ceremony	Category	Recipient	Result	Ref.
Astra Film Awards	January 9, 2026	Best Actress – Drama	Sydney Sweeney	Nominated	
Denver Film Festival	November 5, 2025	Outlaw Award	Ben Foster	Honored	
GLAAD Media Awards	March 5, 2026	Outstanding Film – Wide Release	Christy	Nominated	
Hamptons International Film Festival	October 5, 2025	Achievement in Acting Award	Sydney Sweeney	Honored	
Hollywood Music in Media Awards	November 19, 2025	Music Supervision – Film	Jemma Burns	Nominated	
New York Film Critics Online	December 15, 2025	Best Actress	Sydney Sweeney	Nominated	
Santa Barbara International Film Festival	February 8, 2026	Virtuoso Award	Sydney Sweeney	Honored	
SCAD Savannah Film Festival	October 27, 2025	Spotlight Award	Sydney Sweeney	Honored	
Screen Music Awards Australia	October 28, 2026	Best Soundtrack Album (Antony Partos)	Nominated		
Screen Music Awards Australia	October 28, 2026	Feature Film Score of the Year (Antony Partos)	Nominated		
Women Film Critics Circle	December 18, 2025	Adrienne Shelly Award	Christy	Runner-up	

== See also ==
- List of boxing films
