= Emma Lindsey =

- Occupation: Journalist
- Known for: Britain's first Black woman sportswriter
- Awards: Sports Journalists' Association Best Newcomer of the Year Award (1995)

Emma Lindsey is a British writer and journalist. She became the first Black woman sportswriter in British national press when she began her career in sports journalism at The Observer the 1990s. In addition to sports, she went on to cover issues of race and social justice in The Guardian and The Independent.

== Career ==
Lindsey studied at the London College of Communication (formerly called the London College of Printing), before writing for the Weekly Journal.

Her first major piece in sports journalism - an interview with boxer Chris Eubank for the BBC - caught the attention of Alan Hubbard, who was then the sports editor of The Observer. As a freelancer for the Independent, Lindsey focused on women's boxing, and interviewed Laila Ali, Freeda Foreman, and Jane Couch.

In the 2000s, Lindsey's focus shifted to include sociocultural coverage, including race, gender, and art.

== Selected Reporting ==
- Lindsey, Emma. 14 August 1994. "What's black and white and lives in a political minefield?: Society expects people to be one thing or the other - but what if you're both at once? Emma Lindsey on mixed-race perspectives." The Independent.
- Lindsey, Emma. 13 October 1998. "A mountain to climb." The Guardian.
- Lindsey, Emma. 13 February 2000. "What would you do to get the edge?" The Independent.
- Lindsey, Emma. 4 Jun 2000. "Fan-tastic!" The Guardian.
- Lindsey, Emma. 3 March 2002. "In the name of Allah the Prince gets back on his horse." The Guardian.
