= Dora and Cora Webber =

American boxers

Dora Webber
Personal information
- Nationality: American
- Born: December 5, 1958 (age 67) Los Angeles, United States
- Height: 1.73 m (5 ft 8 in)
- Weight: Middleweight

Boxing career
- Reach: 1.70 m (67 in)
- Stance: Orthodox

Boxing record
- Total fights: 13
- Wins: 4
- Win by KO: 1
- Losses: 5
- Draws: 3
- No contests: 0

Cora Webber
Personal information
- Nationality: American

Boxing career

Dora Webber and Cora Webber (born December 5, 1958) are twin sisters who participate in women's boxing. They are from the U.S. state of Florida. It is believed that at one time, they were the only set of twins to actively participate on boxing's women's leg.

Cora Webber was a participant in the sport of karate before she discovered boxing in 1979, and she allegedly left karate because she kept on being disqualified on her karate fights. Her sister Dora followed her footsteps five years later. The Webbers were among the most popular female boxers of the 1980s and kept on facing top opposition well into the 1990s.

Cora's first fight was against a woman named Toni Lear. Cora won the fight by a decision, earning 100 dollars for her efforts. She put a string of wins together, and won the California State women's title. After that, she had a chance to spar with men's Welterweight world champion Carlos Palomino in Los Angeles.

In 1984, Dora followed suit and began a professional boxing career of her own. Her first opponent was her sister's former rival Lear, who, upon meeting Dora, thought that she was fighting Cora and that Cora was just trying to pull some kind of scam. After she was presented with proof that she was not fighting Cora but her twin sister Dora, Dora proceeded to beat her by a knockout.

Cora has fought, among others, Marian Trimiar, who was beaten twice by Cora, Belinda Laracuente, who also lost to her, and Bonnie Canino, who defeated her by decision. She was the IWBF world Lightweight champion, but lost that honor when she fought a unification bout to the IFBA world champion Zulfia Koutdoussova on January 10, 1998, by a decision in Atlantic City. Dora, meanwhile, who has fought Lucia Rijker, was a world champion in the Junior Middleweight division until she lost the IFBA belt a month after her sister's defeat at the hands of Koutdoussova, by a 10-round decision to Gina Guidi.

During 2021, Dora Webber was inducted into the Women's International Boxing Hall of Fame. Cora Webber was among the Hall's 2022 intake.

== Dora Webber's professional boxing record ==
13 fights	4 wins	6 losses
By knockout	1	1
By decision	3	5
Draws	3	

No.	Result	Record	Opponent	Type	Round, time	Date	Location	Notes
13	Loss	4-6-3	(United States) Sumya Anani	UD		Jun 11, 1999	(United States) Bossier City, Louisiana, USA	
12	Loss	4-5-3	(United States) Sumya Anani	UD		Mar 23, 1999	(United States) KC Market Center, Kansas City, Missouri, USA	International Women's Boxing Federation World welterweight title
11	Loss	4-4-3	(United States) Lisa Ested	KO		Aug 21, 1998	(United States) Baton Rouge, Louisiana, USA	
10	Loss	4-3-3	(United States) Gina Guidi	SD		Feb 15, 1998	(United States) Grand Casino, Biloxi, Mississippi, USA	
9	Win	3-1-4	(United Kingdom) Jane Couch	PTS		Jan 10, 1998	(United States) Tropicana Hotel & Casino, Atlantic City, New Jersey, USA	
8	Win	2-1-4	(United Kingdom) Jane Couch	SD		Oct 24, 1997	(United States) Lady Luck Casino, Lula, Mississippi, USA	vacant International Women's Boxing Federation World super lightweight title
7	Win	2-1-4	(Russia) Zulfia Kutdyusova	UD		Sep 27, 1997	Circus, Moscow, Russia	
6	Loss	1-1-4	(Netherlands) Lucia Rijker	PTS		May 14, 1997	(United States) Foxwoods Resort, Mashantucket, Connecticut, USA	
5	Draw	1-0-4	(United States) Kathy Collins	PTS		Mar 7, 1997	(United States) Music Fair, Westbury, New York, USA	
4	Draw	1-0-3	(United States) Kathy Collins	PTS		Mar 1, 1997	(United States) Convention Center, Atlantic City, New Jersey, USA	
3	Draw	1-0-2	(United States) Leah Mellinger	PTS		Feb 22, 1997	(United States) Harrisburg, Pennsylvania, USA	
2	Draw	1-0-1	(United States) Betty Garner	PTS		Aug 28, 1984	(United States) Municipal Auditorium, Pensacola, Florida, USA	
1	Win	1-0	(United States) Jackie Holley	TKO		Aug 25, 1984	(United States) Municipal Auditorium, Pensacola, Florida, USA	

Cora Webber
Personal information
- Nationality: American
- Born: Cora Moody Webber; December 5, 1958 (age 67) Los Angeles, United States
- Height: 1.73 m (5 ft 8 in)
- Weight: Middleweight

Boxing career
- Reach: 1.70 m (67 in)
- Stance: Orthodox

Boxing record
- Total fights: 10
- Wins: 3
- Win by KO: 1
- Losses: 5
- No contests: 0

== Cora Webber's professional boxing record ==
10 fights	4 wins	5 losses
By knockout	1	0
By decision	3	5
Draws	1	

No.	Result	Record	Opponent	Type	Round, time	Date	Location	Notes
10	Loss	4-5-1	(United States) Melissa Del Valle	UD		Feb 20, 1999	(United States) Madison Square Garden, New York, New York, USA	
9	Loss	4-4-1	(Russia) Zulfia Kutdyusova	SD		Jan 10, 1998	(United States) Tropicana Hotel & Casino, Atlantic City, New Jersey, USA	International Women's Boxing Federation World lightweight title
8	Loss	4-3-1	(United States) Bonnie Canino	SD		Oct 24, 1997	(United States) Lady Luck Casino, Lula, Mississippi, USA	International Female Boxers Association World featherweight title
7	Win	4-2-1	(Puerto Rico) Belinda Laracuente	UD		May 23, 1997	(United States) Charlotte Memorial Auditorium, Punta Gorda, Florida, USA	
6	Loss	3-2-1	(United States) Lena Akesson	PTS		Apr 19, 1997	(United States) Community Center, Palm Bay, Florida, USA	
5	Loss	3-1-1	(United States) Laurie Holt	UD		Mar 23, 1986	(United States) Radisson Hotel, Denver, Colorado, USA	
4	Win	3-0-1	(United States) Lavonne Ludian	KO		Aug 30, 1980	(United States) Hyatt Tahoe, Incline Village, Nevada, USA	
3	Win	2-0-1	(United States) Toni Lear Rodriguez	UD		Dec 8, 1979	(United States) Salt Palace, Salt Lake City, Utah, USA	
2	Win	1-0-1	(United States) Carlotta Lee	UD		Jul 13, 1979	(United States) California, USA	
1	Draw	0-0-1	(United States) Lydia Bayardo	PTS		Feb 11, 1979	(United States) Hawthorne, California, USA	
