= Christy Martin =

American boxer (born 1968)

Christy Salters
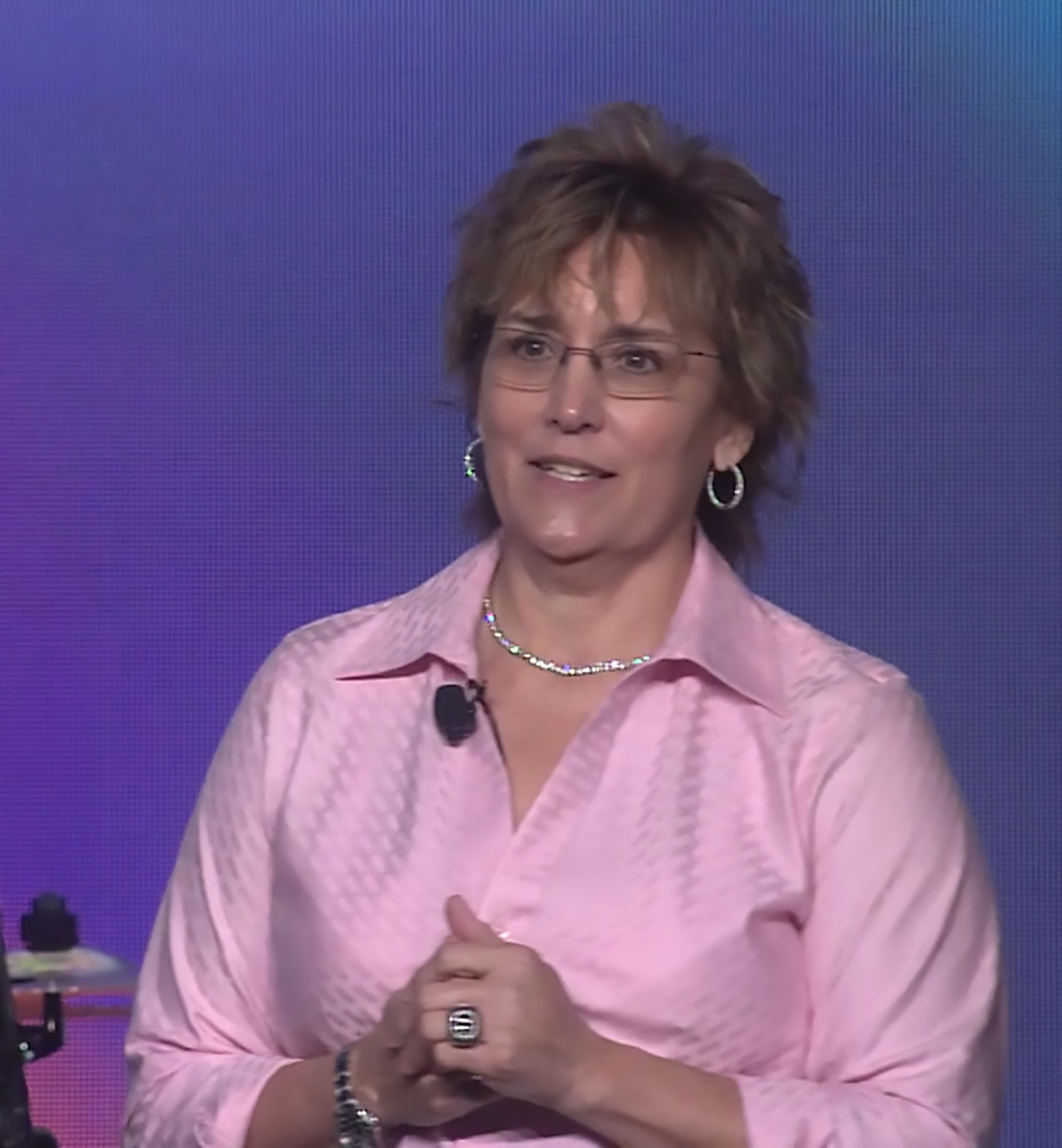
- Martin speaks to Hope House 2024

Personal information
- Nickname: The Coal Miner's Daughter
- Born: Christy Renea Salters; June 12, 1968 (age 58) Mullens, West Virginia, U.S.
- Height: 5 ft 4 1/2 in (164 cm)
- Weight: Light middleweight; Middleweight; Super middleweight
- Spouses: James V. Martin (m. 1991; div. 2010) Lisa Holewyne (m. 2017)

Boxing career
- Reach: 64 in (163 cm)
- Stance: Orthodox

Boxing record
- Total fights: 59
- Wins: 49
- Win by KO: 32
- Losses: 7
- Draws: 3

Christine Renea Salters (previously Martin, born June 12, 1968), nicknamed "the Coal Miner's Daughter", is an American former professional boxer, boxing analyst, and motivational speaker. Competing from 1989–2012, she held the WBC female super welterweight title in 2009. Martin was the first female boxer elected to the Nevada Boxing Hall of Fame in 2016. She was elected to the International Boxing Hall of Fame in 2020, the first year that women were on the ballot.

== Early life ==
Martin was born Christy Renea Salters on June 12, 1968, in Mullens, West Virginia. She attended Mullens High School.

She played various sports as a child including Little League baseball and all-state basketball. According to Martin, she knew that she was a lesbian from "5th or 6th grade". She was in a relationship with her basketball teammate Sherry Lusk throughout high school, of which her parents disapproved. She attended Concord College in Athens, West Virginia, on a basketball scholarship and earned a BS in education.

In her memoir Fighting for Survival, Martin states she was sexually abused as a child by a family friend.

== Professional career ==
Throughout her career, Martin was nicknamed "the Coal Miner's Daughter" in reference to her father's occupation.

Martin is said to be "the most successful and prominent female boxer in the United States" and the person who "legitimized" women’s participation in the sport of boxing. She began her career fighting in "Toughwoman" contests and won three consecutive titles. She then began training with boxing coach Jim Martin, who became her husband in 1991.

Martin started her professional boxing career at the age of 21 with a six-round draw with Angela Buchanan in 1989. She had her first training under the direction of Charlie Sensabaugh of Daniels, West Virginia. Martin won a rematch with Buchanan one month later with a second round knockout. Andrea DeShong then beat Martin in a five-round decision. Martin then had nineteen consecutive wins, including two against Jamie Whitcomb and Suzanne Riccio-Major as well as a rubber match win against Buchanan. On October 15, 1993, Martin defeated Beverly Szymansky. Martin won by knocking out Szymansky in three rounds. Martin fought to a draw against debutante Laura Serrano in Las Vegas.

Martin's next fights included a rematch with Szymansky and a fourth fight with Buchanan. In 1993 Martin signed a promotional agreement with International Hall of Fame Promoter Don King that would put her in the international spotlight. Her first fights in that new agreement would be against Melinda Robinson and Sue Chase on the undercard of the Julio Cesar Chavez vs Frankie Randall fight in the first ever fight card at the MGM Grand Hotel in Las Vegas, Nevada, on January 29, 1994.

On March 16, 1996, Christy Martin vs. Deirdre Gogarty took place, a fight that many credit for popularizing women's boxing. Martin and Deirdre Gogarty fought what many consider a great fight, on the Showtime pay-per-view broadcast of the Mike Tyson vs Frank Bruno WBC Heavyweight Championship. Martin got the decision, and after that bout, she began to gain more celebrity. On April 15, 1996, Martin became the first female boxer to appear on the cover of Sports Illustrated. The headline read, "The Lady Is a Champ".

Martin made a special guest appearance on the television series Roseanne in season 9, episode 6, "Pampered to a Pulp".

Martin won her next eight bouts, including wins against Robinson, DeShong, Marcela Acuña and Isra Girgrah. Martin lost her title in a 10-round decision loss to Sumya Anani in 1998. Martin then won her next nine fights including wins against Belinda Laracuente, Sabrina Hall and Kathy Collins. Martin won her next two fights by ten-round decisions against Lisa Holewyne and Mia St. John.

In 2003 Martin fought Laila Ali and lost by a knockout in the fourth round.

Martin's next fight in 2005 was a second-round knockout against Lana Alexander in Lula, Mississippi.

In 2005 a fight with Lucia Rijker, titled "Million Dollar Lady", was canceled because Rijker ruptured her Achilles during training.

On September 16, 2005, in Albuquerque, New Mexico, Martin lost a 10-round unanimous decision to Holly Holm. Martin was beaten by the 23-year-old southpaw, with all three judges scoring for Holm.

Martin holds a record of 49 wins, 7 losses and 3 draws with 31 wins by knockout. She is a frequent visitor of the International Boxing Hall Of Fame annual induction ceremonies, and an avid autograph signer. She has fought on the undercard of boxers Mike Tyson, Evander Holyfield, Félix Trinidad and Julio César Chávez.

Martin was promoted by Don King, and was the first woman to sign with him. He signed Martin in October 1993 following her third-round knockout win against Beverly Szymanski.

=== Final bouts and retirement ===
Martin announced on January 19, 2011, that she would be fighting again in hopes of her 50th career win on the undercard of the Ricardo Mayorga vs Miguel Cotto fight at the MGM Grand Hotel in Las Vegas, Nevada, on March 12, 2011, against Dakota Stone in a rematch of their 2009 Fight. The fight was postponed due to a rib injury to Martin. The rescheduled rematch took place June 4, 2011, at Staples Center in Los Angeles on the Julio Cesar Chavez Jr. vs Sebastian Zbik undercard. Dakota Stone prevailed by TKO with :51 left as Martin broke her right hand on a punch in the fourth round and could not continue.

=== Post-retirement ===
Martin was among the first inductees in the International Women's Boxing Hall of Fame in 2014.

In 2016, she became the first female boxer inducted into the Nevada Boxing Hall of Fame. That same year, Sports Illustrated reported that she was working two jobs, as a substitute teacher and helping military veterans find work, and that she was dealing with the after effects of her career, including lack of stamina and double vision.

In 2020, she was inducted into the International Boxing Hall of Fame and was elected to it in 2019, the first year that women were on the ballot.

== Personal life ==
Christy married her manager, James V. "Jim" Martin, in 1991. At the time, Christy was 22 while her husband was 47. Christy referred to the marriage as one of convenience and stated her husband was emotionally and physically abusive throughout their relationship, and enabled her addiction to cocaine to control her. She also claimed he used her prize money to pay for an extravagant lifestyle.

Martin married former ring rival Lisa Holewyne on November 25, 2017.

== Attempted murder ==
In March 2010, Christy Martin reconnected with her high school girlfriend Sherry Lusk over social media. Sometime later, Martin told her husband she wanted a divorce. On November 23, 2010, Christy Martin was stabbed several times and shot at least once in her torso and left for dead by her husband, 66-year-old James V. Martin. The attack reportedly occurred after an argument in their Apopka home.

Christy Martin survived the attack. On November 30, 2010, James Martin was arrested and taken to Orlando Regional Medical Center after he stabbed himself. He was booked in Orange County Jail and charged with attempted first-degree murder and aggravated battery with a deadly weapon.

In April 2012, James Martin was found guilty of attempted second-degree murder. Two months later, he was sentenced to 25 years in prison, the mandatory minimum sentence. James Martin died on November 26, 2024, while serving his sentence at Graceville Correctional Facility.

== In popular culture ==
- In 2021, Netflix released Untold: Deal with the Devil, a documentary chronicling Martin’s career and personal life.
- Christy, a biopic of her life starring Sydney Sweeney, premiered in September 2025 at the Toronto International Film Festival. The film was released in theaters on November 7, 2025. Martin makes a cameo towards the end of the film.

== Professional boxing record ==
59 fights	49 wins	7 losses
By knockout	32	2
By decision	17	5
Draws	3	

No.	Result	Record	Opponent	Type	Round, time	Date	Location	Notes
59	Loss	49–7–3	Mia St. John	UD	10	Aug 14, 2012	Friant, California, U.S.	
58	Loss	49–6–3	Dakota Stone	TKO	6 (6)	Jun 4, 2011	Los Angeles, California, U.S.	
57	Win	49–5–3	Dakota Stone	MD	10	Sep 9, 2009	Syracuse, New York, U.S.	Won vacant WBC female super welterweight title
56	Win	48–5–3	Cimberly Harris	SD	6	Aug 1, 2009	Huntington, West Virginia, U.S.	
55	Draw	47–5–3	Valerie Mahfood	MD	8	Jul 18, 2008	Houston, Texas, U.S.	For vacant WBC–NABF female middleweight title
54	Win	47–5–2	Amy Yuratovac	UD	2 (6)	Jun 2, 2007	Lake Charles, Louisiana, U.S.	
53	Loss	46–5–2	Angelica Martinez	SD	10	Oct 6, 2006	Worley, Idaho, U.S.	
52	Loss	46–4–2	Holly Holm	UD	10	Sep 16, 2005	Albuquerque, New Mexico, U.S.	
51	Win	46–3–2	Lana Alexander	KO	2 (6)	Apr 30, 2005	Lula, Mississippi, U.S.	
50	Loss	45–3–2	Laila Ali	KO	4 (10)	Aug 23, 2003	Biloxi, Mississippi, U.S.	For IBA female super middleweight title
49	Win	45–2–2	Mia St. John	UD	10	Dec 6, 2002	Pontiac, Michigan, U.S.	
48	Win	44–2–2	Lisa Holewyne	UD	10	Nov 17, 2001	Las Vegas, Nevada, U.S.	
47	Win	43–2–2	Kathy Collins	MD	10	May 12, 2001	New York City, New York, U.S.	
46	Win	42–2–2	Jeanne Martinez	UD	10	Mar 3, 2001	Las Vegas, Nevada, U.S.	
45	Win	41–2–2	Sabrina Hall	KO	1 (8)	Dec 2, 2000	Las Vegas, Nevada, U.S.	
44	Win	40–2–2	Dianna Lewis	UD	10	Aug 12, 2000	Las Vegas, Nevada, U.S.	
43	Win	39–2–2	Belinda Laracuente	MD	8	Mar 3, 2000	Las Vegas, Nevada, U.S.	
42	Win	38–2–2	Daniella Somers	TKO	5 (10)	Oct 2, 1999	Las Vegas, Nevada, U.S.	
41	Win	37–2–2	Jovette Jackson	TKO	1	Apr 24, 1999	Washington, D.C., U.S.	
40	Loss	36–2–2	Sumya Anani	MD	10	Dec 18, 1998	Fort Lauderdale, Florida, U.S.	
39	Win	36–1–2	Christine Robinson	TKO	5 (6)	Sep 19, 1998	Atlanta, Georgia, U.S.	
38	Win	35–1–2	Cheryl Nance	TKO	9 (10)	Aug 29, 1998	Las Vegas, Nevada, U.S.	
37	Win	34–1–2	Marcela Acuña	UD	10	Dec 5, 1997	Pompano Beach, Florida, U.S.	
36	Win	33–1–2	Isra Girgrah	UD	8	Aug 23, 1997	New York City, New York, U.S.	
35	Win	32–1–2	Andrea DeShong	TKO	7 (8)	Jun 28, 1997	Las Vegas, Nevada, U.S.	
34	Win	31–1–2	Bethany Payne	TKO	1 (6)	Nov 9, 1996	Las Vegas, Nevada, U.S.	
33	Win	30–1–2	Melinda Robinson	KO	4	Sep 7, 1996	Las Vegas, Nevada, U.S.	
32	Win	29–1–2	Deirdre Gogarty	UD	6	Mar 16, 1996	Las Vegas, Nevada, U.S.	
31	Win	28–1–2	Del Pettis	TKO	1	Feb 24, 1996	Richmond, Virginia, U.S.	
30	Win	27–1–2	Sue Chase	TKO	3 (6)	Feb 10, 1996	Las Vegas, Nevada, U.S.	
29	Win	26–1–2	Melinda Robinson	UD	6	Jan 13, 1996	Miami, Florida, U.S.	
28	Win	25–1–2	Erica Schmidlin	TKO	1	Dec 16, 1995	Philadelphia, Pennsylvania, U.S.	
27	Win	24–1–2	Angela Buchanan	TKO	2 (6)	Aug 12, 1995	Las Vegas, Nevada, U.S.	
26	Win	23–1–2	Beverly Szymanski	KO	4 (6)	Apr 1, 1995	Las Vegas, Nevada, U.S.	
25	Win	22–1–2	Chris Kreuz	TKO	4 (6)	Sep 12, 1994	Las Vegas, Nevada, U.S.	
24	Draw	21–1–2	Laura Serrano	UD	6	May 7, 1994	Las Vegas, Nevada, U.S.	
23	Win	21–1–1	Sonja Donlevy	TKO	1	Mar 4, 1994	Las Vegas, Nevada, U.S.	
22	Win	20–1–1	Susie Melton	TKO	1 (6)	Jan 29, 1994	Las Vegas, Nevada, U.S.	
21	Win	19–1–1	Beverly Szymanski	KO	3	Oct 15, 1993	Auburn Hills, Michigan, U.S.	
20	Win	18–1–1	Rebecca Kirkland	TKO	1 (6)	Aug 27, 1993	Punta Gorda, Florida, U.S.	
19	Win	17–1–1	Deborah Cruickshank	KO	1 (4)	May 28, 1993	Punta Gorda, Florida, U.S.	
18	Win	16–1–1	Susie Hughes	TKO	1	Jan 29, 1993	Columbia, South Carolina, U.S.	
17	Win	15–1–1	Angela Buchanan	TKO	1	Nov 14, 1992	Greenville, South Carolina, U.S.	
16	Win	14–1–1	Tracy Gordon	TKO	1	Sep 5, 1992	Daytona Beach, Florida, U.S.	
15	Win	13–1–1	Stacey Prestage	UD	8	May 30, 1992	Daytona Beach, Florida, U.S.	
14	Win	12–1–1	Jackie Thomas	TKO	3 (8)	Jan 25, 1992	Daytona Beach, Florida, U.S.	
13	Win	11–1–1	Rose Noble	TKO	1	Jan 11, 1992	Grundy, Virginia, U.S.	
12	Win	10–1–1	Shannon Davenport	TKO	2	Sep 10, 1991	Princeton, West Virginia, U.S.	
11	Win	9–1–1	Rhonda Hefflin	KO	1	May 25, 1991	Tennessee, U.S.	
10	Win	8–1–1	Pat Watts	TKO	1	Mar 16, 1991	Chattanooga, Tennessee, U.S.	
9	Win	7–1–1	Suzanne Riccio	PTS	5	Feb 25, 1991	Bristol, Tennessee, U.S.	
8	Win	6–1–1	Jamie Whitcomb	TKO	2 (5)	Jan 12, 1991	Bristol, Tennessee, U.S.	
7	Win	5–1–1	Lisa Holpp	TKO	1	Oct 27, 1990	Bristol, Tennessee, U.S.	
6	Win	4–1–1	Jamie Whitcomb	PTS	6	Sep 22, 1990	Johnson City, Tennessee, U.S.	
5	Win	3–1–1	Andrea DeShong	PTS	5	Apr 21, 1990	Bristol, Tennessee, U.S.	
4	Loss	2–1–1	Andrea DeShong	MD	5	Nov 4, 1989	Bristol, Tennessee, U.S.	
3	Win	2–0–1	Tammy Jones	TKO	1	Oct 21, 1989	Bristol, Tennessee, U.S.	
2	Win	1–0–1	Angela Buchanan	KO	2	Sep 30, 1989	Durham, North Carolina, U.S.	
1	Draw	0–0–1	Angela Buchanan	PTS	5	Sep 9, 1989	Bristol, Tennessee, U.S.	
