= Jaime Clampitt =

Canadian boxer (born 1976)

Jaime Clampitt-Hayes
Personal information
- Nickname: The Hurricane
- Born: July 8, 1976 (age 50) Gravelbourg, Saskatchewan, Canada
- Height: 5 ft 5.5 in (166.4 cm)
- Weight: Lightweight, Super-lightweight

Boxing career
- Reach: 66 in (168 cm)
- Stance: Orthodox

Boxing record
- Total fights: 35
- Wins: 25
- Win by KO: 7
- Losses: 7
- Draws: 2
- No contests: 1

Jaime "Hurricane" Clampitt-Hayes (born July 8, 1976) is a Canadian former boxer. A four-time world champion at two different weights, she was inducted into the International Women's Boxing Hall of Fame in 2021. Clampitt-Hayes retired in 2013 but made a comeback in 2021, before finally hanging up her gloves in June 2024.

== Professional boxing record ==
35 fights	25 wins	7 losses
By knockout	7	2
By decision	18	5
Draws	2	
No contests	1	

No.	Result	Record	Opponent	Type	Round, time	Date	Location	Notes
35	Loss		Kandi Wyatt	TKO		2024-06-15	Mohegan Sun Casino, Uncasville, Connecticut, USA	
34	Win		Josefina Vega	UD		2023-08-12	Mohegan Sun Casino, Uncasville, Connecticut, USA	
33	Win		Taynna Cardoso	UD		2023-03-25	Park Theatre, Cranston, Rhode Island, USA	
32	Loss		Miranda Reyes	UD		2022-06-24	Twin River Event Center, Lincoln, Rhode Island, USA	
31	Win		Kim Wabik	UD		2022-02-19	Crowne Plaza Hotel, Warwick, Rhode Island, USA	
30	Draw		Olivia Gerula	UD		2021-06-19	Cranston Stadium, Cranston, Rhode Island, USA	
29	Win		Dominga Olivo	UD		2013-11-22	Twin River Event Center, Lincoln, Rhode Island, USA	
28	Loss		(United States) Holly Holm	TKO		2010-08-06	Hard Rock, Albuquerque, New Mexico, USA	vacant International Boxing Association female super lightweight title
27	Win		Jill Emery	MD		2010-03-19	Twin River Event Center, Lincoln, Rhode Island, USA	
26	Win		Rachel Clark	UD		2009-11-20	Twin River Event Center, Lincoln, Rhode Island, USA	
25	Win		(Puerto Rico) Belinda Laracuente	MD		2008-03-14	Twin River Event Center, Lincoln, Rhode Island, USA	International Women's Boxing Federation World lightweight title
24	Win		(United Kingdom) Jane Couch	UD		2007-06-20	Foxwoods Resort, Mashantucket, Connecticut, USA	
23	Win		(United States) Mia St. John	UD		2007-02-09	Convention Center, Providence, Rhode Island, USA	vacant International Women's Boxing Federation World lightweight title
22	Loss		(United States) Melissa Fiorentino	UD		2006-05-18	Convention Center, Providence, Rhode Island, USA	International Women's Boxing Federation World lightweight title
21	Win		Shelby Walker	TKO		2005-08-26	Convention Center, Providence, Rhode Island, USA	International Women's Boxing Federation World lightweight title
20	Win		Leora Jackson	TKO		2005-06-17	Theatre at Dunkin Donuts Center, Providence, Rhode Island, USA	
19	Draw		Eliza Olson	PTS		2004-12-10	Foxwoods Resort, Mashantucket, Connecticut, USA	vacant International Women's Boxing Federation World super lightweight title
18	Win		Brenda Drexel	UD		2004-10-01	Bayside Expo Center, Boston, Massachusetts, USA	
17	Loss		(United Kingdom) Jane Couch	UD		2004-06-12	Foxwoods Resort, Mashantucket, Connecticut, USA	International Women's Boxing Federation World super lightweight title WBA-NABA female super lightweight title
16	Win		Lani Ellis	RTD		2004-03-27	Foxwoods Resort, Mashantucket, Connecticut, USA	International Women's Boxing Federation World super lightweight title vacant WBA-NABA female super lightweight title
15	Win		Eliza Olson	UD		2003-10-31	Convention Center, Providence, Rhode Island, USA	vacant International Women's Boxing Federation World super lightweight title
14	Win		Crystal Bolles	TKO		2003-07-18	Cape Cod Melody Tent, Hyannis, Massachusetts, USA	
13	Win		Ragan Pudwill	KO		2003-03-07	St. Leonard's Church, Boston, Massachusetts, USA	
12	Win		Cynthia Jones	MD		2003-01-11	Dunkin Donuts Center, Providence, Rhode Island, USA	
11	Win		Summer De Leon	MD		2002-10-25	Foxwoods Resort, Mashantucket, Connecticut, USA	
10	Win		Connie Bechtel	UD		2002-06-28	Park Plaza Castle, Boston, Massachusetts, USA	
9	Win		Kanicia Eley	UD		2002-04-12	Coleman Theatre, Miami, Oklahoma, USA	
8	Loss		Elizabeth Mueller	UD		2001-12-07	Foxwoods Resort, Mashantucket, Connecticut, USA	vacant International Women's Boxing Federation World lightweight title
7	Win		Erica Sugar	UD		2001-08-10	Foxwoods Resort, Mashantucket, Connecticut, USA	
6	Win		Anita Parker	TKO		2001-06-02	Rhodes-on-the-Pawtuxet, Cranston, Rhode Island, USA	
5	NC		Brenda Drexel	ND		2001-05-19	Inner City Athletic Club, Calgary, Alberta, Canada	
4	Loss		Elizabeth Mueller	MD		2001-02-09	Foxwoods Resort, Mashantucket, Connecticut, USA	
3	Win		Cathy Boyes	UD		2000-09-20	Edmonton, Alberta, Canada	
2	Win		Jamie Day	UD		2000-04-26	Saskatoon, Saskatchewan, Canada	
1	Win		Christina Miller	TKO		2000-01-15	Ogden Legion, Calgary, Alberta, Canada	

== See also ==
- List of female boxers
