= Sumya Anani =

American boxer (born 1972)

Personal information
- Nickname: Island Girl
- Nationality: American
- Born: February 12, 1972 (age 54) Minnesota, U.S.
- Height: 5 ft 6 in (168 cm)
- Weight: Welterweight
- Website: http://www.sumya.com

Boxing career
- Reach: 65 in (170 cm)
- Stance: Orthodox

Boxing record
- Total fights: 29
- Wins: 25
- Win by KO: 10
- Losses: 3
- Draws: 1
- No contests: 0

Sumya Anani (born February 12, 1972) is a retired American professional female boxer nicknamed "The Island Girl." She was 5'6" and boxed as a junior welterweight. She is best known for a 1996 bout which left her opponent severely injured and may have served as an inspiration for the film Million Dollar Baby. Outside the ring, she is a yoga instructor and holistic healer.

Anani was born in Minnesota and raised in Kansas. She competed as a weightlifter in 1995 and 1996. She took up boxing for self-defense and started boxing professionally because she was "short on cash." She began to box professionally in the summer of 1996.

She began by boxing against relatively unknown opponents. Her fourth professional bout was in St. Joseph, Missouri against Katie Dallam, a novice welterweight who had only gotten her pro boxing license the day before — a pairing described as "an obvious mismatch." In four rounds she landed 119 blows to Dallam's head. Dallam collapsed in her dressing room afterward and required brain surgery. Anani was so upset she considered quitting boxing.

She came to prominence in the boxing world on September 30, 1997, when she defeated former WIBF lightweight champion Stacy Prestage by a knockout. On March 28, 1998, she scored "the sport's biggest upset" with a unanimous six-round decision over veteran Andrea DeShong, considered "the standard bearer for the sport." On December 18, 1998, she fought boxing star Christy Martin and won the match, handing Martin her first defeat since November 1989.

In 2016, Anani was inducted into the International Women's Boxing Hall of Fame in Fort Lauderdale, Florida. The IWBHF was created and founded by Sue TL Fox.

== Professional boxing record ==
29 fights	25 wins	3 losses
By knockout	10	0
By decision	15	3
Draws	1	

No.	Result	Record	Opponent	Type	Round, time	Date	Location	Notes
29	Loss	25–3–1	(United States) Terri Blair	TKO	9 (10)	May 27, 2006	(United States) Louisville Gardens, Louisville, Kentucky, USA	For IBA Female welterweight title
28	Loss	25–2–1	(United States) Terri Blair	TKO	10 (10)	Mar 25, 2006	(United States) Grand Victoria Casino, Rising Sun, Indiana, USA	Lost IBA Female welterweight title
27	Win	25–1–1	(Puerto Rico) Belinda Laracuente	UD	10	Jan 22, 2005	(United States) Coushatta Casino Resort, Kinder, Louisiana, USA	Retained IBA Female welterweight title
26	Win	24–1–1	(United States) Stephanie Jaramillo	UD	10	Dec 4, 2004	(United States) Municipal Auditorium, Kansas City, Missouri, USA	Retained IBA Female super lightweight title
25	Win	23–1–1	(United States) Lisa Holewyne	UD	6	Apr 24, 2004	(United States) Staples Center, Los Angeles, California, USA	
24	Win	22–1–1	(United States) Fredia Gibbs	RTD	1 (8)	Apr 18, 2003	(United States) Palace Indian Gaming Center, Lemoore, California, USA	
23	Win	21–1–1	(United States) Lisa Holewyne	KO	5 (10)	Nov 2, 2002	(United States) The Palace, Auburn Hills, Michigan, USA	Won vacant IBA Female welterweight title
22	Win	20–1–1	(United Kingdom) Jane Couch	TKO	4 (10)	Jun 21, 2002	(United States) Convention Center, Waco, Texas, USA	Won vacant Female IBA super lightweight title
21	Win	19–1–1	(United States) Britt Van Buskirk	UD	8	Feb 1, 2002	(United States) Coca-Cola Center, Oklahoma City, Oklahoma, USA	
20	Draw	18–1–1	(United States) Fredia Gibbs	PTS	10	Nov 16, 2001	(United States) Convention Center, Austin, Texas, USA	For vacant Female IBA super lightweight title
19	Win	18–1	(United States) Britt Van Buskirk	UD	10	Oct 20, 2001	(United States) Seven Feathers Hotel & Casino Resort, Canyonville, Oregon, USA	Won vacant Female IBF and Global Boxing Union Female welterweight titles
18	Win	17–1	(United States) Elizabeth Mueller	UD	10	May 11, 2001	(United States) Convention Center, Tulsa, Oklahoma, USA	Won vacant IBA Female lightweight title
17	Loss	16–1	(United States) Britt Van Buskirk	SD	6	Sep 17, 2000	(United States) Harrah's Casino, Saint Louis, Missouri, USA	
16	Win	16–0	(United States) Vicki Woods	UD	8	Jun 25, 2000	(United States) Majestic Star Casino, Gary, Indiana, USA	
15	Win	15–0	(United States) Dora Webber	UD	10	Jun 11, 1999	(United States) Bossier City, Louisiana, USA	
14	Win	14–0	(United States) Dora Webber	UD	8	Mar 23, 1999	(United States) KC Market Center, Kansas City, Missouri, USA	
13	Win	13–0	(United States) Denise Moraetes	UD	8	Mar 12, 1999	(United States) Roseland Ballroom, New York, New York, USA	
12	Win	12–0	(United States) Christy Martin	MD	10	Dec 18, 1998	(United States) Memorial Auditorium, Fort Lauderdale, Florida, USA	
11	Win	11–0	(United States) Alicia Sparks	TKO	1 (6)	Sep 18, 1998	(United States) Flamingo Casino, Kansas City, Missouri, USA	
10	Win	10–0	(United States) Andrea DeShong	UD	6	Mar 28, 1998	(United States) KC Market Center, Kansas City, Missouri, USA	
9	Win	9–0	(United States) Loretta James	TKO	1 (4)	Jan 31, 1998	(United States) Convention Center, Des Moines, Iowa, USA	
8	Win	8–0	(United States) Charlotte Esparza	KO	1 (4)	Nov 13, 1997	(United States) Ramada Inn, Jefferson City, Missouri, USA	
7	Win	7–0	(United States) Stacey Prestage	KO	4 (6)	Sep 30, 1997	(United States) KC Market Center, Kansas City, Missouri, USA	
6	Win	6–0	(United States) Ashley Needham	UD	4	Apr 2, 1997	(United States) Station Casino, Kansas City, Missouri, USA	
5	Win	5–0	(United States) Shelley Walden	TKO	4 (4)	Mar 19, 1997	(United States) Omaha, Nebraska, USA	
4	Win	4–0	(United States) Katherine Dallam	TKO	4 (4)	Dec 11, 1996	(United States) O'Fireman's Local 77, Saint Joseph, Missouri, USA	
3	Win	3–0	(United States) Valerie Almack	TKO	2 (4)	Oct 16, 1996	(United States) Beaumont Club, Kansas City, Missouri, USA	
2	Win	2–0	(United States) Jessica Breitfelder	UD	4	Aug 26, 1996	(United States) Midnight Rodeo, Springfield, Missouri, USA	
1	Win	1–0	(United States) Jessica Breitfelder	UD	4	Aug 12, 1996	(United States) Beaumont Club, Kansas City, Missouri, USA	

== See also ==
- List of female boxers
