= Melissa Fiorentino =

American boxer (born 1977)

Personal information
- Nickname: The Fury
- Nationality: American
- Born: Melissa Fiorentino; January 19, 1977 (age 49) Cranston, Rhode Island, United States
- Weight: Super Featherweight

Boxing career
- Stance: Orthodox

Boxing record
- Total fights: 19
- Wins: 17
- Win by KO: 6
- Losses: 2
- Draws: 0
- No contests: 0

Melissa "Missy" Fiorentino (born January 19, 1977) is a female boxer from Cranston, Rhode Island, United States. Her fighting nickname is: "The Fury."

A world champion in women's boxing. she has two defeats, one in a world championship bout, and she has been active as a professional since 2001.

She made her professional debut on November 16, 2001, knocking out Vanessa Pine in the first round in front of a hometown crowd. Fiorentino next beat Ragan Pudwill by knockout in round two on April 4, 2002.

Fiorentino won her first four fights by knockout. On October 4, 2002, she fought Trisha Hill at the Dunkin' Donuts Center, in Providence. Hill became the first fighter to last the scheduled distance with Fiorentino, but Fiorentino beat her by a four-round unanimous decision.

Next was Brenda Drexel, a relatively experienced fighter of 24 previous fights, who also went on to lose by a four-round unanimous decision to Fiorentino, on May 2, 2003. This the bout was held at the Foxwood Casino in Connecticut.

Two knockouts followed, one in three rounds over Liz Drew and the other, a second round victory over previously undefeated Talia Smith.

Next came what, perhaps, has been Fiorentino's most important victory to date: on May 14, 2004, she met the former and future world champion "Downtown Leona Brown" in Providence, with Fiorentino earning a six-round unanimous decision win.

With that win, Fiorentino got a chance to fight for the world title for the first time: In her first fight abroad, she battled Emiko Raika for the WIBA world Featherweight title on September 18 in Kyoto, Japan. Fiorentino lost her first world title fight by a 10-round unanimous decision.

Fiorentino was inducted into the International Women's Boxing Hall of Fame in 2019.

== Professional boxing record ==
19 fights	17 wins	2 losses
By knockout	6	1
By decision	11	1

No.	Result	Record	Opponent	Type	Round, time	Date	Location	Notes
17	Win		Cindy Serrano	UD		2007-07-07	Joseph L. Bruno Stadium, Troy, New York	NABF female super featherweight title
16	Win		Belinda Laracuente	UD		2006-12-01	Convention Center, Providence, Rhode Island, USA	
15	Win		Jaime Clampitt	UD		2006-05-18	Convention Center, Providence, Rhode Island, USA	International Women's Boxing Federation World lightweight title
14	Win		Esther Schouten	UD		2005-11-23	Convention Center, Providence, Rhode Island, USA	vacant International Women's Boxing Federation World featherweight title
13	Win		Belinda Laracuente	UD		2005-07-08	Hampton Beach Casino, Hampton Beach, New Hampshire, USA	
12	Win		Lisa Lewis	UD		2005-06-17	Theatre at Dunkin Donuts Center, Providence, Rhode Island, USA	
11	Win		Kim Colbert	UD		2005-03-25	Dorchester Armory, Dorchester, Massachusetts, USA	
10	Loss		Emiko Raika	UD		2004-09-18	Kyoto, Japan	Women's International Boxing Association World featherweight title
9	Win		Leona Brown	UD		2004-05-14	Convention Center, Providence, Rhode Island, USA	
8	Win		Talia Smith	KO		2003-10-31	Convention Center, Providence, Rhode Island, USA	
7	Win		Liz Drew	TKO		2003-08-01	Hampton Beach Casino, Hampton Beach, New Hampshire, USA	
6	Win		Brenda Drexel	UD		2003-05-02	Foxwoods Resort, Mashantucket, Connecticut, USA	
5	Win		Trisha Hill	UD		2002-10-04	Dunkin Donuts Center, Providence, Rhode Island, USA	
4	Win		Melissa Quashi	TKO		2002-07-26	Rhodes-on-the-Pawtuxet, Cranston, Rhode Island, USA	
3	Win		Vicky Clardy	KO		2002-05-24	Rhodes-on-the-Pawtuxet, Cranston, Rhode Island, USA	
2	Win		Ragan Pudwill	KO		2002-04-04	Foxwoods Resort, Mashantucket, Connecticut, USA	
1	Win		Vanessa Pine	TKO		2001-11-16	Rhodes-on-the-Pawtuxet, Cranston, Rhode Island, USA	
