= Tracy Byrd (boxer) =

American boxer (born 1964)

Personal information
- Nickname: The Lady
- Born: Tracy Michelle Byrd; August 27, 1964 (age 62) Flint, Michigan, United States
- Height: 5 ft 4 in (163 cm)
- Weight: Super bantamweight Lightweight

Boxing career
- Stance: Orthodox

Boxing record
- Total fights: 24
- Wins: 13
- Win by KO: 4
- Losses: 10
- Draws: 1

Tracy Michelle Byrd (born August 27, 1964, Flint, Michigan) is an American female boxer. She was inducted into the International Women's Boxing Hall of Fame in 2022.

== Early life ==
Byrd comes from a boxing family: her father, Joe Byrd, is a former boxer who trained her.

Her brother Antoine once lost to Roy Jones Jr. in a bid to win the world's Middleweight title, and her other brother, Chris, is a former heavyweight title holder.

Tracy Byrd enjoyed athletics since she was a young child. She excelled in high school as a basketball player. Her brothers Antoine and Chris, however, inspired her into trying out boxing, so she began to attend the Byrd boxing gym, owned by her father.

== Professional career ==
On her first professional fight, August 6, 1996, the then 32-year-old boxer beat Sue Chase by a decision in four rounds in Flint. Her first three fights were held in Flint, and she earned first round knockouts in professional fights number two and three.

Her fourth fight, a rematch with Chase on January 28, 1997, took place just outside Flint, in Detroit. Byrd again outpointed Chase over four rounds.

After beating Dee Dufoe by decision in six in what turned out to be her first fight held outside Michigan (the fight was held in Indio, California), Byrd was given the opportunity to challenge for a world championship for the first time: On August 2, 1997, she defeated defending champion Nora Daigle to become the IFBA world Lightweight champion, in Biloxi, Mississippi.

Byrd retained the title on October 24 with a fourth-round knockout of Bethanny Payne in New Jersey. After this fight, and since Byrd continued undefeated in nine fights, Byrd was given some attention by boxing magazines such as The Ring and KO. But, on her second defense, held on June 30, 1998, she lost her title, and her undefeated mark, to Russian Zulfia Koutdoussova, who, as a consequence, inherited the media attention that Byrd was receiving.

Byrd rebounded with three consecutive decision wins, and she was given a second chance at becoming a world champion, when she met Laura Serrano of Mexico on September 2, 1999. She lost by a ten-round decision in Tunica, Mississippi, for the WIBF's world Lightweight title.

Byrd then took off two years from boxing, deciding to lose weight and return as a Junior Lightweight in 2001. Initially, she had success fighting at a lower weight class, conquering the vacant IFBA intercontinental title with a ten-round unanimous decision over Brenda Vickers on May 19, at Ignacio, Colorado.

Her next fight was for the IFBA world Featherweight title, on July 7. She lost that world championship bid, being outpointed over ten rounds by Layla McCarter. This was the beginning of a five fight losing streak for Byrd. All those fights were lost by decision, and they included two more losses to McCarter, another loss to Koutdoussova, and a defeat at the hands of Isra Girgrah.

Despite losing five times in a row, she was given yet another world title chance, when, on March 22, 2003, she faced Agnieszka Rylik for the WIBO world Jr. Welterweight title. Byrd became a world champion for the second time, when she defeated Rylik by a ten-round split decision in Las Vegas, Nevada.

Her next, and so far last, fight, took place on June 28 of that year, when she and Puerto Rico's Belinda Laracuente drew (tied) in an eight rounds non-title bout held at Coconut Grove, Florida.

Byrd has a record of thirteen wins, seven losses and one draw, with four wins by knockout, she has not been knocked out as a professional.

== Championships and accomplishments ==
- 2001 IFBA Intercontinental Super Featherweight Title
- 1998 IWBF Lightweight Title
- 1997 IFBA Lightweight Title (1 defense)

== Professional boxing record ==
24 fights	13 wins	10 losses
By knockout	4	1
By decision	9	9
Draws	1	

No.	Result	Record	Opponent	Type	Round, time	Date	Location	Notes
24	Loss		(Mexico) Laura Serrano	RTD		2006-04-01	Sky Ute Casino, Ignacio, Colorado, US	
23	Loss		(United States) Valanna McGee	UD		2005-08-26	Radisson Hotel, Sacramento, California, US	
22	Loss		(Canada) Kara Ro	UD		2005-02-18	State Fair Grounds, Detroit, Michigan, US	
21	Draw		(Puerto Rico) Belinda Laracuente	PTS		2003-06-28	Seminole Casino, Coconut Creek, Florida, US	
20	Win		(Poland) Agnieszka Rylik	SD		2003-03-22	Mandalay Bay Resort & Casino, Las Vegas, Nevada, US	
19	Loss		(United States) Layla McCarter	SD		2003-03-07	City Center Pavilion, Reno, Nevada, US	
18	Loss		(United States) Layla McCarter	MD		2003-02-15	Caesars Palace, Las Vegas, Nevada, US	
17	Loss		(Russia) Zulfia Kutdyusova	UD		2002-04-26	Ramada Hotel O'Hare, Rosemont, Illinois, US	
16	Loss		(Yemen) Isra Girgrah	SD		2002-02-28	Wyndham Hotel, Baltimore, Maryland, US	
15	Loss		(United States) Layla McCarter	UD		2001-07-07	Sky Ute Casino, Ignacio, Colorado, US	International Female Boxers Association World featherweight title
14	Win		(United States) Brenda Vickers	UD		2001-05-19	Sky Ute Casino, Ignacio, Colorado, US	
13	Loss		(Mexico) Laura Serrano	UD		1999-09-02	Gold Strike Casino, Tunica, Mississippi, US	
12	Win		(United States) Carla Witherspoon	UD		1999-07-31	IMA Sports Arena, Flint, Michigan, US	
11	Win		(United States) Vicki Woods	UD		1999-03-11	Gold Strike Casino, Tunica, Mississippi, US	
10	Win		Corrine Geeris	UD		1998-11-13	Jackpot Junction Casino, Morton, Minnesota, US	vacant International Women's Boxing Federation World lightweight title
9	Loss		Zulfia Kutdyusova	UD		1998-06-30	Lady Luck Casino, Lula, Mississippi, US	International Female Boxers Association World lightweight title
8	Win		Bethany Payne	KO		1997-10-24	Lady Luck Casino, Lula, Mississippi, US	International Female Boxers Association World lightweight title
7	Win		Nora Daigle	UD		1997-08-02	Grand Casino, Biloxi, Mississippi, US	International Female Boxers Association World lightweight title
6	Win		Dee Dufoe	UD		1997-05-17	Fantasy Springs Casino, Indio, California, US	
5	Win		Vicki Woods	TKO		1997-03-18	IMA Sports Arena, Flint, Michigan, US	
4	Win		Sue Chase	UD		1997-01-28	The Palace, Auburn Hills, Michigan, US	
3	Win		Shannon Williams	TKO		1996-10-19	Dearborn, Michigan, US	
2	Win		Kathleen Ridell	TKO		1996-10-08	IMA Sports Arena, Flint, Michigan, US	
1	Win		Sue Chase	PTS		1996-08-06	IMA Sports Arena, Flint, Michigan, US	

== See also ==
- List of female boxers
