= Stephanie Jaramillo =

American boxer (born 1982)

Personal information
- Nickname: Golden Girl
- Nationality: American
- Born: Stephanie Jaramillo; May 18, 1982 (age 44) Albuquerque, New Mexico, United States
- Weight: Welterweight

Boxing career
- Stance: Orthodox

Boxing record
- Total fights: 7
- Wins: 4
- Win by KO: 2
- Losses: 2
- Draws: 1

Stephanie "Golden Girl" Jaramillo (born May 18, 1982) is an American former professional boxer. She has been inducted into the Amateur Athletic World Hall of Fame Museum for outstanding boxing achievement. Jaramillo is a member of the International Women's Boxing Hall of Fame.

== Childhood ==
Stephanie "Golden Girl" Jaramillo is a native of the South Valley located in Albuquerque, New Mexico. She became attracted to boxing from seeing a Mike Tyson fight at her grandparents’ house. In her adolescence Jaramillo sparred neighborhood kids, but her father would not allow her to train at boxing until he had seen a female boxing bout on TV, which finally happened when Jaramillo was 14. She had her first amateur fight two and a half months later (a knockout).

== Early career ==
Jaramillo had over 40 amateur bouts. She won the junior division in the New Mexico state amateur championships in 1996 and 1997. In 1998 she won a silver medal in the junior division of the Women's National Championships. She placed in two other competitions in 1999, and achieved a gold medal in the 1999 Everlast National PAL Championships, defeating future pro boxers Andrea Nelson and Kelly Whaley, both by 5-0 decisions.

In 2000, she competed in dual meets on the USA Women's Amateur Boxing Team, once against Canada, and twice against Russia. She earned a silver medal in all three meets.

Highlights of Jaramillo's amateur career:

- 1996 – State Champion-Junior Division
- 1997 - State Champion – Junior Division
- 1997 – Junior Olympics Champion
- 1997 – Silver Gloves Champion – Junior Division
- 1997 – Golden Gloves Champion – Junior Division
- 1998 – State Champion – Junior Division
- 1998 – Junior Olympics Champion
- 1998 – Silver Gloves Champion- Junior Division
- 1998 – Silver Gloves Champion – Junior Division
- 1998 – Golden Gloves Champion – Junior Division
- 1998 – Women's National Championships-Junior Division, Silver Medalist
- 1999 – Everlast Women's National Championships – Open Division, Bronze Medalist
- 1999 – Ringside Women's National Golden Gloves – Open Division, Silver Medalist
- 1999 – Everlast National PAL Championships – Open Division, Gold Medalist (Defeated, now pro-boxers, Andrea Nelson and Kelly Whaley, both 5-0 decision)
- 2000 – Everlast Women's Nationals – Bronze Medalist
- 2000 – USA vs. Canada – Silver Medalist
- 2000 – USA vs. Russia Dual – Silver Medalist (Nov. 15)
- 2000 – USA vs. Russia Dual – Silver Medalist (Nov. 17)

As an amateur Stephanie's strength trainer was Koeth Jardine

== Professional career ==
Jaramillo made her pro debut on June 29, 2002. She had seven professional bouts.

On December 3, 2004, she fought Sumya Anani, who at the time held the WIBA, IFBA, IBA, and GBU titles. Jaramillo went the distance but lost by decision.

== Retirement ==
Jaramillo announced her retirement on May 10, 2005. She remains active in boxing management and training. She was inducted into the Amateur Athletic World Hall of Fame Museum for Outstanding Boxing Achievement.

Jaramillo is Vice President of her family company, AmeriStar Construction, Inc. She says, "If not for the sweat and tears and hard work of my mother and father, the company would not be where it is today." Now President Ricky Jaramillo, his wife Angela Jaramillo, and Stephanie run the business

She was inducted into the International Women's Boxing Hall of Fame in 2025.

== Professional record at a glance ==
=== 2002 ===
- June 28, 2002 - Santa Ana, Bernalillo, NM - Martha Flores - TKO 2
- March-15-2002- Acoma Angie Poe UD 4

=== 2003 ===
- May-23-2003 - Albuquerque - Mimi Palfy TKO 1
- August 26-2003- Albuquerque Holly Holm Majority Decision 4
- October-3-2003- Albuquerque Holly Holm DRAW 6

=== 2004 ===
- February 24, 2004, Bernalillo, NM Imelda Arias UD 6
- December 3, 2004 - Kansas City, MO Sumya Anani UD 10 WIBA World Jr. Welterweight title

== Professional boxing record ==
7 fights	4 wins	2 losses
By knockout	2	0
By decision	2	2
Draws	1	

No.	Result	Record	Opponent	Type	Round, time	Date	Location	Notes
7	Loss	4–2–1	(United States) Sumya Anani	UD	10	2004–12–03	(United States) Municipal Auditorium, Kansas City, Missouri, USA	For Women's IBA Super lightweight title.
6	Win	4–1–1	(Mexico) Imelda Arias	UD	6	2004–02–28	(United States) Santa Ana Star Casino, Bernalillo, New Mexico, USA	
5	Draw	3–1–1	(United States) Holly Holm	PTS	6	2003–10–03	(United States) Sandia Resort and Casino, Albuquerque, New Mexico, USA	
4	Loss	3–1	(United States) Holly Holm	MD	4	2003–08–26	(United States) Sandia Resort and Casino, Albuquerque, New Mexico, USA	
3	Win	3–0	(United States) Mimi Palfy	TKO	1 (4), 2:59	2003–05–23	(United States) Sandia Resort and Casino, Albuquerque, New Mexico, USA	
2	Win	2–0	(United States) Angie Poe	UD	4	2003–03–15	(United States) Sky City Casino, Acoma, New Mexico, USA	
1	Win	1–0	(United States) Martha Flores	TKO	3 (4)	2002–06–28	(United States) Santa Ana Star Casino, Bernalillo, New Mexico, USA	Professional debut.
