= Kara Ro =

Canadian boxer (born 1975)

Personal information
- Born: Kara Olivia Rheault; November 9, 1975 (age 50) Sudbury, Ontario, Canada
- Height: 5 ft 8 in (173 cm)

Boxing career
- Stance: Orthodox

Boxing record
- Wins: 17
- Win by KO: 7
- Losses: 0
- Draws: 0

Kara Olivia Rheault (born November 9, 1975), best known as Kara Ro, is a Canadian boxing and MMA trainer, retired boxer, and radio broadcaster. She held the Women's International Boxing Association lightweight title in 2005. Ro was inducted into the International Women's Boxing Hall of Fame in 2025.

== Early life ==
Ro has enjoyed an extensive career as an athlete and as a professional trainer. As early as the first grade, she received awards for her athleticism. In high school, while maintaining academic excellence, Ro excelled in athletics. She was a member of eight high school teams including basketball, volleyball, co-ed volleyball, track and field, tennis, badminton, swimming, and baseball. Ro was awarded M.V.P. in basketball, volleyball, co-ed volleyball, and track and field and was the city champion in tennis and triple jump.

Ro was the youngest player elected to the city's All-Star basketball team and won numerous awards as a tournament All-Star in volleyball. Ro's achievements and leadership awarded her both the junior and the senior athlete of the year awards. As a university student, Ro played volleyball for the University of Windsor. Not only was she elected captain of the team, but she also ranked in the top ten in Canada.

After her second year at university, Ro was introduced to the world of boxing. After two years in Windsor boxing clubs, Ro decided to go to Detroit, Michigan. In addition to many outstanding boxing awards in her amateur competitions, Ro won the prestigious Ringside National Tournament.

== Boxing career ==
Ro fought and won all 18 of her pro bouts between 2002 and 2011, and won the vacant Women's International Boxing Association version of the women's world lightweight title in June 2005. Chronic back injuries affected her ability to walk after surgery for extended periods. Ro fought only four times in the next six years. Ro retired to marriage and family life, and has become a noted amateur and professional MMA and boxing trainer in the Windsor and Detroit areas.

== Broadcasting career ==
Ro has also had a career in radio, serving as an on-air host for CKUE-FM until being laid off in 2012. From 2016 to 2019, she hosted the afternoon show The TKO Show on CKLW. In August 2024, she became a morning co-host on CKWW, and began hosting middays for its Hamilton sister station CKOC.

== Professional boxing record ==
17 fights	17 wins	0 losses
By knockout	7	0
By decision	10	0

No.	Result	Record	Opponent	Type	Round, time	Date	Location	Notes
17	Win		Elizabeth Sherman	UD		2011-10-06	Motor City Casino, Detroit, Michigan, USA	
16	Win		Lakeysha Williams	UD		2008-03-29	Soaring Eagle Casino, Mount Pleasant, Michigan, USA	
15	Win		Lakeysha Williams	UD		2008-02-22	Ford Community Center, Dearborn, Michigan, USA	
14	Win		Kim Colbert	UD		2006-09-15	Little River Casino, Manistee, Michigan, USA	
13	Win		(Puerto Rico) Belinda Laracuente	UD		2005-06-10	State Fair Grounds, Detroit, Michigan, USA	vacant Women's International Boxing Association World lightweight title
12	Win		Tracy Byrd	UD		2005-02-18	State Fair Grounds, Detroit, Michigan, USA	
11	Win		Renee Richardt	TKO		2004-11-19	Michigan State Fairgrounds, Detroit, Michigan, USA	
10	Win		Angie Poe	UD		2004-08-28	Cobo Hall, Detroit, Michigan, USA	
9	Win		Crystal Bolles	KO		2004-07-17	Cobo Arena, Detroit, Michigan, USA	
8	Win		Talia Smith	TKO		2004-04-02	Joe Louis Arena, Detroit, Michigan, USA	
7	Win		Blanca Luna	UD		2004-03-12	Edgewater Hotel & Casino, Laughlin, Nevada, USA	
6	Win		(United States) Sarah Schneider	TKO		2003-12-05	Polk County Convention Center, Des Moines, Iowa, USA	
5	Win		Leona Tanner	TKO		2003-09-02	Mountaineer Casino Racetrack and Resort, Chester, West Virginia, USA	
4	Win		Melissa Rodriguez	TKO		2003-08-30	Sam's Town Casino, Tunica, Mississippi, USA	
3	Win		Kim Colbert	UD		2003-06-27	Joe Louis Arena, Detroit, Michigan, USA	
2	Win		Julia Day	TKO		2003-02-07	The Palace, Auburn Hills, Michigan, USA	
1	Win		Terri Blair	UD		2002-09-27	The Palace, Auburn Hills, Michigan, USA	
