= Isra Girgrah =

Yemeni-born American boxer

Personal information
- Nationality: American
- Born: September 16, 1971 (age 54) Aden, South Yemen
- Height: 5 ft 7 in (170 cm)
- Weight: Featherweight

Boxing career
- Reach: 69 in (175 cm)
- Stance: Orthodox

Boxing record
- Total fights: 33
- Wins: 28
- Win by KO: 11
- Losses: 3
- Draws: 2

Isra Girgrah (born September 16, 1971) is a Yemeni-born American professional world champion female boxer. She was inducted into the International Women's Boxing Hall of Fame in 2020.

== Family and early life ==
The Girgrah family is of the old gypsy roaming families of Aden who are originally of Ethiopian descent. They trace their roots to the southern Yemeni mountains. Isra, at the age of 3, moved to Canada with her family in 1974 and began boxing there in 1994 to stay in shape. A multi-sport star in high school, volleyball and soccer she proved a natural as a boxer. She took it up again after graduating from college and moving to Atlanta, Georgia, United States.

== Career ==
Girgrah, whose world boxing identification number is MD040035, is an American citizen, although the "MD" in her identification number stands for Middle East. Her nickname is "Raging Beauty". Her record includes holding 4 World Class Belts (IBF Lightweight Champion, UBA Lightweight Champion, IWBF Jr. Lightweight Champion & WIBF Jr. Lightweight Champion).

Her professional boxing debut came on February 14, 1995, in Louisiana, when she lost to future world champion Deirdre Gogarty by a knockout in three rounds. On November 2, she acquired her first victory, a six-round decision win, over Melinda Robinson, another future world champion, in Austin, Texas.

On January 19, 1996, Girgrah recorded her first knockout win, beating Amy Sherald in the first round at Philadelphia, Pennsylvania. Her wins over Robinson and Sherrald were the beginning of a six fight winning streak, which included another victory over Robinson, with a six-round unanimous decision on February 22, 1996 in Corpus Christi, Texas. The streak came to a halt when she faced Andrea DeShong, on October 6 of the same year. She and DeShong fought to a four-round draw (tie) in Washington, D.C. After that, Girgrah knocked out Norma Mosley in the second round fifteen days later, to begin a three fight winning streak that also included wins over Bethany Payne and in a rematch against Tennile Davis.

Girgrah then faced Christy Martin on a pay per view televised match that formed part of an undercard that included the Trinidad-Waters and López-Sánchez bouts. Girgrah lost to Martin on points over eight rounds, but her name's stock rose in defeat, as most boxing magazine writers agreed that she performed well against the defending WBC women's world champion.

On April 11, 1998, she rebounded from defeat in her first world title try, by knocking out Andrea Buchanan in three rounds at Columbia, South Carolina. Next came a rematch with Bethany Payne, whom Girgrah beat by a knockout in seven rounds on November 20, at Stone Mountain, Georgia. After one more victory, she was beaten on October 23, 1999 by Marischa Sjauw by a four-round decision. This fight marked Girgrah's Las Vegas debut. On February 16, 2000, she faced the well known Britt Van Buskirk in Miami, being held to a draw after four rounds.

Girgrah fought Melinda Robinson for the third time on July 12 at Woodlawn, Maryland. Girgrah obtained her third consecutive win against Robinson with a six-round unanimous decision. On September 16, she beat Susan Mullett by a unanimous six-round decision in Atlantic City, New Jersey. After one more win, Girgrah received her second world championship opportunity.

On January 12, 2001, she and Mullet were rematched, with the UBA's vacant world Lightweight championship on the line. Girgrah became the first Middle Eastern woman to be a world champion in boxing history when she knocked out Mullet in the fourth round, in a fight that was, once again, held in Atlantic City. After a fourth win over Robinson, she met Snodene Blackeney on June 1, at Atlantic City, to unify her UBA title with the WIBF world championship. Girgrah added the WIBF's belt with a ten-round unanimous decision over Blackeney.

Girgrah won her next three bouts, but she did not expose the WIBF title in any of those fights, reason why she was stripped of the WIBF championship. She won all three of those non-title bouts, which included a February 28, 2002 ten-round decision victory over Tracy Byrd in Baltimore. After those three wins, however, she was given an opportunity to regain her WIBF championship.

Fighting for the vacant championship that she had vacated herself, Girgrah met Michele Nielsen on August 24, with Girgrah recovering the title by a ten-round decision win, once again, in Atlantic City. She followed this win with a series of non-title bouts, which led to her being stripped again, this time of the UBA and the WIBF belts. But among the fighters she beat were Mexico's Laura Serrano, decisioned over eight rounds on April 18, 2003 in Lemoore, California, and Puerto Rico's Melissa Del Valle, outpointed over eight rounds on September 6 of that same year in Washington D.C.

After the win against Del Valle, Girgrah fought Jo Wyman on December 13, for the IFBA's vacant world Jr. Lightweight title. Contrary to common boxing practice, Girgrah won her second division world championship by going down in weight, when she outpointed Wyman over 10 rounds in Washington. On March 27, 2004, she had her fourth victory against Carla Witherspoon, defeating Witherspoon by a six-round unanimous decision in Washington. The March 27 bout was Girgrah's last fight to date.

== Records ==
Isra Girgrah has a record of 28 wins, 3 losses and 2 draws in 33 bouts as a professional boxer, with 11 wins by knockout. Her record includes holding 4 World Class Belts. IBF Lightweight Champion, UBA Lightweight Champion, IWBF Jr. Lightweight Champion, WIBF Jr. Lightweight Champion

== Professional boxing record ==
33 fights	28 wins	3 losses
By knockout	11	1
By decision	17	2
Draws	2	

No.	Result	Record	Opponent	Type	Round, time	Date	Location	Notes
33								
32								
31			Melissa Del Valle					
30								
29								
28								
27	Win		Michele Nielsen	UD		2002-08-24	Resorts Hotel & Casino, Atlantic City, New Jersey, USA	Women's International Boxing Federation World super featherweight title
26	Win		Carla Witherspoon	TKO		2002-06-15	DC Tunnel, Washington, District of Columbia, USA	
25	Win		Cheryl Nance	UD		2002-04-12	DC Tunnel, Washington, District of Columbia, USA	
24	Win		Tracy Byrd	SD		2002-02-28	Wyndham Hotel, Baltimore, Maryland, USA	
23	Win		Snodene Blakeney	UD		2001-06-01	Sands Casino Hotel, Atlantic City, New Jersey, USA	vacant Women's International Boxing Federation World super featherweight title
22	Win		Melinda Robinson	UD		2001-02-20	Hyatt Regency Hotel, Baltimore, Maryland, USA	
21	Win		Susan Mullett	TKO		2001-01-12	Sands Casino Hotel, Atlantic City, New Jersey, USA	
20	Win		Carla Witherspoon	UD		2000-10-19	Zembo Shrine, Harrisburg, Pennsylvania, USA	
19	Win		Susan Mullett	UD		2000-09-15	Sands Casino Hotel, Atlantic City, New Jersey, USA	
18	Win		(United States) Melinda Robinson	UD		2000-07-12	Martin's West, Woodlawn, Maryland, USA	
17	Draw		Britt Van Buskirk	PTS		2000-02-16	Miccosukee Indian Gaming Resort, Miami, Florida, USA	
16	Win		Marischa Sjauw	UD		1999-10-23	MGM Grand, Las Vegas, Nevada, USA	
15	Win		Karen Ramos	TKO		1999-09-02	Gold Strike Casino, Tunica, Mississippi, USA	
14	Win		Bethany Payne	TKO		1998-11-20	Stone Mountain, Georgia, USA	
13	Win		Angela Buchanan	TKO		1998-04-11	Township Auditorium, Columbia, South Carolina, USA	
12	Loss		(United States) Christy Martin	UD		1997-08-23	Madison Square Garden, New York, New York, USA	
11	Win		Tennile Davis	PTS		1997-07-19	Arena, Nashville, Tennessee, USA	
10	Win		Bethany Payne	PTS		1997-01-31	Doraville, Georgia, USA	
9	Win		Norma Mosley	KO		1996-10-25	Atlanta, Georgia, USA	
8	Draw		(United States) Andrea DeShong	PTS		1996-10-10	Hilton Towers Hotel, Washington, District of Columbia, USA	
7	Win		Stephanie Osborne	TO		1996-08-30	International Ballroom, Atlanta, Georgia, USA	
6	Win		Tennile Davis	TKO		1996-08-02	Northport, Alabama, USA	
5	Win		Angela Thomas	TKO		1996-02-24	Caswell Civic Center, Yanceyville, North Carolina, USA	
4	Win		Melinda Robinson	UD		1996-02-22	Corpus Christi, Texas, USA	
3	Win		Amy Sherrald	TKO		1996-01-19	Blue Horizon, Philadelphia, Pennsylvania, USA	
2	Win		Melinda Robinson	UD		1995-11-02	Music Hall, Austin, Texas, USA	
1	Loss		(Republic of Ireland) Deirdre Gogarty	TKO		1995-02-14	(United States) Youth Center, Cut Off, Louisiana, USA	
