= Deirdre Gogarty =

Irish boxer

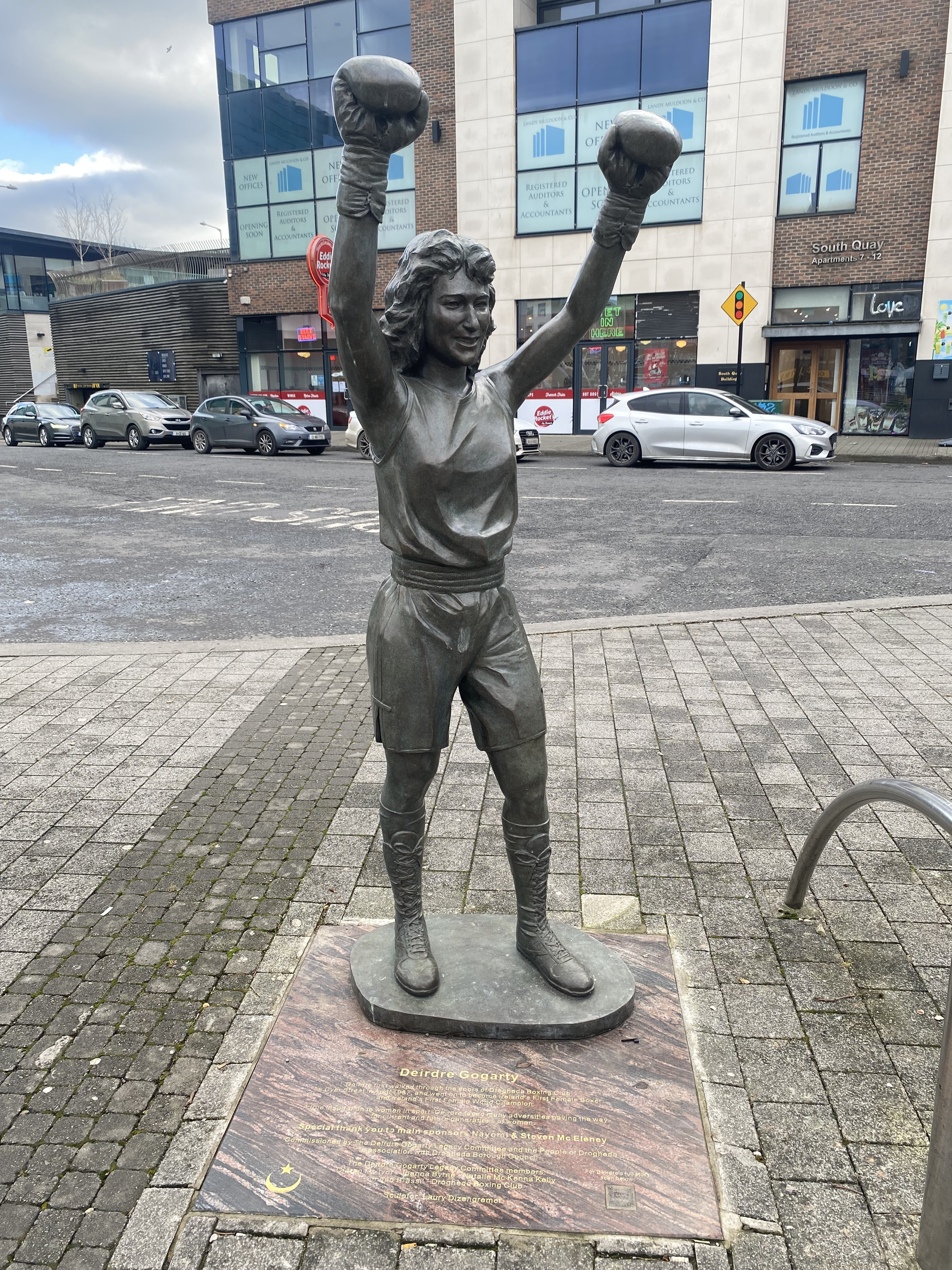

Personal information
- Nickname: Dangerous
- Nationality: Irish
- Born: 10 November 1969 (age 56) Drogheda, Ireland
- Height: 5 ft 5 1/2 in (166 cm)
- Weight: Featherweight

Boxing career
- Stance: Orthodox

Boxing record
- Total fights: 23
- Wins: 16
- Win by KO: 14
- Losses: 5
- Draws: 2

Deirdre Gogarty (born 10 November 1969) is an Irish former female boxer who is coach of the Ragin' Cajun Boxing Club. Originally from Drogheda in County Louth, she attended Drogheda Grammar School. Before a law was passed in Ireland preventing women from engaging in boxing events, Gogarty was able to begin her career with a six-round decision win against Anne-Marie Griffin. However, when that law was passed, Gogarty could not engage in competition in Ireland. In consequence, she was based in Lafayette, Louisiana and was managed and trained by Beau Williford.

The law preventing females from participating in the sport of boxing in Ireland has since been revoked and there is an increasing number of females becoming involved with the sport thanks to its Olympic acceptance and the consistent international success of Katie Taylor.

After leaving Ireland, Gogarty's next three fights took her to London and Kansas City, Missouri. In London, she defeated Jane Johnson twice, by a four-round knockout and by and eight-round decision. In Kansas City, she drew after six rounds with Stacy Prestage After the rematch with Johnson, she obtained her first knockout in the first round, beating Jane McGhee. Another win followed this and she was matched with Prestage again, resulting in another draw after six rounds.

Following the emerging pattern, another win followed this tie and she was matched against Prestage for a rubber match. However, this time Gogarty suffered her first loss when Prestage won a ten-round decision over her. Two more wins followed this defeat, including a six-round knockout of the top contender Carol Brown and a first-round knockout win over Missy Buchanan. In spite of this winning streak, Gogarty next lost a six-round decision when she faced Mary Ann Almager.

Gogarty followed this defeat with a win, after which she was matched with Isra Girgrah, whom Gogarty knocked out in three rounds. This is considered her biggest win to date. She then boxed another of female boxing's top competitors when she faced Laura Serrano, who beat Gogarty by a knockout in round seven. A knockout win in the first round followed this defeat, when she fought Jessica Breitfelder. Gogarty then participated in the fight many credit as putting female boxing on the sports' fan page: she and Christy Martin faced each other in a six-round match that was televised by Showtime. This fight made the covers of many magazines. Many fans of women's boxing considered it the female version of the Thrilla in Manila. Martin won by a six-round decision.

Gogarty succeeded in winning another three fights consecutively before she challenged Bonnie Canino for the Women's International Boxing Federation's Women's World Featherweight Championship. Gogarty became a World Champion after winning the fight on a ten-round decision. This made her the first Irishwoman to win any boxing world title; the fight occurred in the United States in 1997. She defended her title against Monique Strohman and Debra Strohman. Both were defeated in first-round knockouts. In her last fight, Gogarty lost her title to Beverly Szymanski on a 10-round decision.

Gogarty co-wrote her memoir, My Call to the Ring: A Memoir of a Girl Who Yearns to Box, with Darrelyn Saloom. The book was published by Glasnevin Publishing on 8 August 2012. The next day, Katie Taylor won a gold medal for Ireland in the 2012 Summer Olympics, which included women's boxing for the first time.

In 2015, Gogarty was inducted into the International Women's Boxing Hall of Fame in Fort Lauderdale, Florida. The IWBHF was created by founder Sue TL Fox.

== Professional boxing record ==
23 fights	16 wins	5 losses
By knockout	13	1
By decision	3	4
Draws	2	

No.	Result	Record	Opponent	Type	Round, time	Date	Location	Notes
23	Loss	16-5-2	(United States) Beverly Szymanski	UD		1 October 1998	(United States) Tropicana Hotel & Casino, Atlantic City, New Jersey, USA	vacant International Women's Boxing Federation World featherweight title
22	Win	16-4-2	(United States) Monique Stroman	TKO		19 April 1998	(United States) Memorial Auditorium, Shreveport, Louisiana, USA	
21	Win	15-4-2	(United States) Bonnie Canino	UD		11 January 1997	(United States) UNO Lakefront Arena, New Orleans, Louisiana, USA	Women's International Boxing Federation World featherweight title
20	Win	14-4-2	(United States) Debra Stroman	TKO		11 January 1997	(United States) Nashville Arena, Nashville, Tennessee, USA	
19	Win	13-4-2	(United States) Patricia Simms	KO		29 November 1997	(United States) Saint Paul, Minnesota, USA	
18	Win	12-4-2	(United States) Sharon Yates	TKO		29 November 1997	(United States) UAW Hall, Parma, Ohio, USA	
17	Win	11-4-2	(United States) Sharon Yates	KO		27 October 1996	(United States) Cleveland, Ohio, USA	
16	Win	10-4-2	(United States) Shannise Davis	TKO		18 September 1996	(United States) War Memorial Auditorium, Fort Lauderdale, Florida, USA	
15	Win	9-4-2	(United States) Jessica Breitfelder	KO		13 July 1996	(United States) Mammoth Events Center, Denver, Colorado, USA	
14	Loss	8-4-2	(United States) Christy Martin	UD		16 March 1996	(United States) MGM Grand, Las Vegas, Nevada, USA	
13	Win	8-3-2	(United States) Jessica Breitfelder	TKO		30 November 1995	(United States) Capitol Plaza Hotel, Jefferson City, Missouri, USA	
12	Loss	7-3-2	(Mexico) Laura Serrano	TKO		20 April 1995	(United States) Aladdin Hotel & Casino, Las Vegas, Nevada, USA	Women's International Boxing Federation World lightweight title
11	Win	7-2-2	(United States) Isra Girgrah	TKO		14 February 1995	(United States) Youth Center, Cut Off, Louisiana, USA	
10	Win	6-2-2	(United States) Gail Grandchamp	TKO		6 October 1994	(United States) Tampa, Florida, USA	
9	Loss	5-2-2	(United States) Mary Ann Almager	TKO	6	22 July 1994	(United States) Fort Smith, Arkansas, USA	
8	Win	5-1-2	(United States) Angela Buchanan	TKO		8 April 1994	(United States) Kansas City, Missouri, USA	
7	Loss	4-1-2	(United States) Stacey Prestage	PTS		23 November 1993	(United States) Kansas City, Missouri, USA	
6	Draw	4-0-2	(United States) Stacey Prestage	PTS		2 August 1993	(United States) Marriott Downtown, Kansas City, Missouri, USA	Women's International Boxing Association World lightweight title
5	Win	4-0-1	(United States) Jane McGhee	TKO		13 May 1993	(United States) Fort Smith, Arkansas, USA	
4	Win	3-0-1	(United Kingdom) Jane Johnson	TKO		24 April 1993	London, United Kingdom	
3	Draw	2-0-1	(United States) Stacey Prestage	TD		25 January 1993	(United States) Allis Plaza Hotel, Kansas City, Missouri, USA	
2	Win	2-0	(United Kingdom) Jane Johnson	TKO		8 April 1992	Town Hall, Leeds, Yorkshire, United Kingdom	
1	Win	1-0	(Republic of Ireland) Anne-Marie Griffin	PTS		30 June 1991	(Republic of Ireland) Limerick, Ireland	
