= Laura Serrano =

Mexican boxer

Personal information
- Nickname: La Poeta del Ring
- Nationality: (Mexico) Mexican
- Born: Laura Serrano Garcia; October 20, 1967 (age 58) Mexico City, Mexico
- Height: 165 cm (5 ft 5 in)
- Weight: Featherweight

Boxing career
- Stance: Southpaw

Boxing record
- Total fights: 25
- Wins: 17
- Win by KO: 6
- Losses: 4
- Draws: 2

Laura Serrano Garcia (born October 20, 1967, in Mexico City) is a Mexican boxer.

Serrano began boxing at the Universidad Nacional Autónoma de México in Mexico City, where she was studying to become a lawyer. She wanted to lose weight and stay in shape. She applied for a professional boxer's license in Mexico. After a short appearance in two episodes of the Volver a empezar soap opera, she went to Las Vegas, and on a pay per view card she challenged Christy Martin for the world title. It was her first fight as a professional and resulted in a draw.

Serrano's next fight was against world champion Deirdre Gogarty. She won by a knockout in seven rounds, in what was the first all women's boxing undercard held at the Aladdin Hotel & Casino in Las Vegas.

Serrano was supposed to box on the Julio César Chávez-Miguel Ángel González Pay Per View event's undercard in Mexico City. However, a ban from 1947 was found, forbidding women from boxing events in Mexico City. Thanks in part to Serrano's subsequent legal battle, the ordinance was dropped.

Serrano suffered a foot injury for which she underwent surgery, but in 1999 she came back and won a decision in her comeback bout. She then, on 2 September 1999, [details from her BoxRec page] met and defeated the world champion Tracy Byrd to become Mexico's first woman world boxing champion.

She defended her title against Cinthya Prouder (won in a unanimous decision after round 6), Alicia Ashley (won in a unanimous decision after round 8), Gina Greenwald (knockout in round 1) and Kelsey Jeffries (knockout in round 3), followed. The Jeffries fight resulted in Jeffries' first defeat.

On August 12, 2008, Serrano challenged Melissa Del Valle for the Junior Lightweight title. Once again, this world title attempt resulted in a draw (tie).

Serrano has won her last two world title defenses, both decisions, one in ten rounds in Las Vegas and another one, a six-round win in Phoenix.

== Personal ==
As of 2005, she was engaged to be married. Serrano is also a lawyer.

During 2015, she was inducted as the first Mexican female boxer in the International Women's Boxing Hall of Fame.

== Professional boxing record ==
25 fights	17 wins	5 losses
By knockout	6	0
By decision	11	5
Draws	3	

No.	Result	Record	Opponent	Type	Round, time	Date	Location	Notes
25								
24								
23	Loss		Ina Menzer	UD		2007-11-17	Bordelandhalle, Magdeburg, Sachsen-Anhalt, Germany	Women's International Boxing Federation World featherweight title
22	Win		Shanty Ortiz	UD		2007-09-21	Sindicato de Taxistas, Cancun, Quintana Roo, Mexico	
21	Loss		Jeannine Garside	UD		2006-11-04	Shaw Conference Centre, Edmonton, Alberta, Canada	vacant Women's International Boxing Association World featherweight title
20	Win		(United States) Tracy Byrd	RTD		2006-04-01	Sky Ute Casino, Ignacio, Colorado, US	
19	Loss		Jo Wyman	UD		2003-07-15	Playboy Mansion, Beverly Hills, California, US	
18	Loss		(United States) Isra Girgrah	SD		2003-04-18	Palace Indian Gaming Center, Lemoore, California, US	
17	Win		Jo Wyman	TKO		2003-02-07	HP Pavilion, San Jose, California, US	
16	Win		Jo Wyman	MD		2002-03-22	Celebrity Theater, Phoenix, Arizona, US	
15	Win		Kelsey Jeffries			2001-11-11	Belterra Casino Resort, Elizabeth, Indiana, US	
14	Win		Snodene Blakeney	UD		2001-09-23	Sunset Station, San Antonio, Texas, US	
13	Win		(United States) Chevelle Hallback	MD		2001-07-08	Texas Station Casino, Las Vegas, Nevada, US	
12	Draw		(United States) Melissa Del Valle	PTS		2000-08-12	Miccosukee Indian Gaming Resort, Miami, Florida, US	Women's International Boxing Association World super featherweight title
11	Win		Kelsey Jeffries	TKO		2000-06-16	Mandalay Bay Resort & Casino, Las Vegas, Nevada, US	
10	Win		Gina Greenwald	TKO		2000-05-24	Treasure Chest Casino, Kenner, Louisiana, US	
9	Win		(United States) Alicia Ashley	UD		2000-02-11	Gold Strike Casino, Tunica, Mississippi, US	
8	Win		Cynthia Prouder	UD		1999-09-27	Great Western Forum, Inglewood, California, US	
7	Win		(United States) Tracy Byrd	UD		1999-09-02	Gold Strike Casino, Tunica, Mississippi, US	
6	Win		(United States) Layla McCarter	SD		1999-07-26	Great Western Forum, Inglewood, California, US	
5	Win		Gloria Ramirez	PTS		1998-05-01	Ciudad Juarez, Chihuahua, Mexico	
4	Win		Cheryl Nance	TKO		29 Mar 1997	Hilton Hotel, Las Vegas, Nevada, US	
3	Win		Maria Nieves Garcia	PTS		1996-04-22	Tijuana, Baja California, Mexico	
2	Win		(Republic of Ireland) Deirdre Gogarty	TKO		1995-04-20	Aladdin Hotel & Casino, Las Vegas, Nevada, US	Women's International Boxing Federation World lightweight title
1	Draw		(United States) Christy Martin	PTS		May 7, 1994	MGM Grand, Las Vegas, Nevada, US	
