= International Women's Boxing Hall of Fame =

Sports hall of fame

The International Women's Boxing Hall of Fame (IWBHF) is a sports hall of fame located in Vancouver, Washington. It is dedicated to women's boxing, and was started by Sue TL Fox and her website Women Boxing Archive Network. The Hall of Fame has a board of 11 members, who vote on nominees who are submitted to the IWBHF by the public. Terri Moss, a 2015 inductee, says that the IWBHF helps show women's accomplishments in the sport. Their primary mission is to "call honorary attention to those professional female boxers (now retired) along with men and women whose contributions to the sport and its athletes, from outside the ring, have been instrumental in growing female boxing."

== History ==
Women Boxing Archive Network (also known as WBAN) is an American-based women's boxing website. The website reports women's boxing news, archives women's boxing history, publishes women's boxing results, creates their own women's boxing world ranking and profiles women boxers. The website was founded and is owned by former professional boxer (ranked number 1 in the world in 1979) Sue Fox; it began in May 1998.

The International Women's Boxing Hall of Fame first surged as an idea in 2013, by Sue TL Fox, the Founder and Creator of Women Boxing Archive Network [WBAN]. That year the WBAN, a website dedicated to women's boxing exclusively, announced that steps were being taken to open the Hall of Fame.

The Hall of Fame's first inductee class was announced in April, 2014, and its first induction ceremony took place on July 11, 2014, and was attended by among others, Claressa Shields, women's boxing gold medalist at the 2012 London Olympic Games.

On July 4, 2021, the International Women's Boxing Hall of Fame announced that the event that takes place on August 14, 2021, at the Orleans Hotel & Casino, in Las Vegas, Nevada, has been declared a "Proclamation Day" by the Honorable Carolyn G. Goodman, Mayor of the City of Las Vegas as "Women's Boxing Day." Mayor Carolyn G. Goodman said in the Proclamation Letter, "By virtue of the Authority given to me by the Laws of the State of Nevada and by the Charter of the City of Las Vegas, do hereby Proclaim, AUGUST 14, 2021 as "WOMEN'S BOXING DAY" in the city of Las Vegas and all Residents and Visitors to join me in celebrating the Inductees for the 2020-2021 International Women's Boxing Hall of Fame. We congratulate the women boxers and other inductees for their hard work and dedication to the sport of boxing."

== Inductees ==
=== 2014 class ===
- Barbara Buttrick
- Bonnie Canino
- Regina Halmich
- Christy Martin
- Christy Halbert
- Lucia Rijker
- JoAnn Hagen

=== 2015 class ===
- Laila Ali
- Jeannine Garside
- Deirdre Gogarty
- Phyllis Kugler (Posthumous)
- Sparkle Lee
- Terri Moss
- Laura Serrano
- Ann Wolfe

=== 2016 class ===
- Sumya Anani
- Jane Couch
- Elena Reid
- Ann Saccurato
- Giselle Salandy
- Marian “Tyger” Trimiar
- Britt Vanbuskirk
- Jackie Kallen

=== 2017 class ===
- Aileen Eaton
- Holly Holm
- Daisy Lang
- Ria Ramnarine
- Ana María Torres
- Ada Velez

=== 2018 class ===
- Myriam Lamare
- Belinda Laracuente
- Jessica Rakoczy
- Mary Jo Sanders
- Vonda Ward
- Julie Lederman
- Belle Martell
- Bernie McCoy

=== 2019 class ===
- Carina Moreno
- Wendy Rodriquez
- Bridgett Riley
- Martha Salazar
- Lisa Holewyne
- Terri Cruz
- Melissa Fiorentino
- Pat Emerick
- David Avila
- Stephen Blea
- Blanca Gutierrez
- Patricia Martinez-Pino

=== 2020 class ===
==== Boxers ====
- Sharon Anyos
- Lisa Brown
- Kelsey Jeffries
- Michele Aboro
- Melinda Cooper
- Valerie Mahfood
- Mary Ortega
- Isra Girgrah
- Jaime Clampitt
- Graciela Casillas

==== Non-boxing category ====
- Mary Ann Owen
- Shelley Williams

=== 2021 class ===
==== Boxers ====
- Alicia Ashley
- Kathy Collins
- Gina Guidi
- Bonnie Mann
- Anne Sophie Mathis
- Ina Menzer
- Natascha Ragosina
- Marischa Sjauw
- Dora Webber
- Jo Wyman

==== Non-boxing category ====
- Roy Englebrecht
- Carol Steindler

=== 2022 class ===
International Women’s Boxing Hall of Fame Announcement.

==== Boxers ====
- Eva Jones-Young
- Margaret Sidoroff
- Hannah Fox
- Eliza Olson
- Tori Nelson
- Fredia Gibbs
- Brooke Dierdorff
- Tracy Byrd
- Yvonne Reis
- Delia Gonzalez
- Susi Kentikian
- Cora Webber

==== Non-boxing category ====
- Tom Gerbasi
- Rose Byrd (Posthumous)
- Jimmy Finn
- Rose Trentman

=== 2023 class ===
==== Boxers ====
- Kaliesha West
- Sonya Lamonakis
- Laura Ramsey
- Kim Messer
- Leah Mellinger
- Jenifer Alcorn
- Melissa McMorrow
- Yvonne Trevino
- Melissa Del Valle

==== Non-boxing category ====
- Jill Diamond Chastain
- Bruce Silverglade
- Dallas Malloy

=== 2024 class ===
==== Boxers ====
- Agnieszka Rylik
- Daniella Smith
- Suzy Taylor
- Rhonda Luna
- María Jesús Rosa (Posthumous)
- Jacqui Frazier-Lyde
- Esther Schouten
- Stacy Prestage
- Sindy Amador

==== Non-boxing category ====
- Judy Kulis
- Lou Dibella
- Jenny Reid

=== 2025 class ===
==== Boxers ====
- Jackie Nava
- Vaia Zaganas
- Kina Malpartida
- Jennifer Han
- Shelly Vincent
- Helga Risoy
- Diana Prazak
- Kara Ro
- Frida Wallberg
- Kathy Williams
- Yvonne Caples
- Jolene Blackshear
- Yessica Chávez
- Stephanie Jaramillo
- Jill Matthews
- Carlette Ewell
- Yvonne Barkley

==== Non-boxing category ====
- Linda Platt
- Don King
- Diane Fischer

=== 2026 class ===
==== Boxers ====
- Seniesa Estrada
- Cindy Serrano
- Raja Amasheh
- Kali Reis
- Melissa Hernández
- Heather Hardy
- Ronica Jeffrey
- Hollie Dunaway
- Momo Koseki
- Naoko Fujioka
- Eva Wahlström
- Alejandra Oliveras (Posthumous)
- Deborah Nichols
- Christine Kreuz
- Mitzi Jeter
- Sandra Yard

==== Non-boxing category ====
- Al Bernstein
- Bettina Palle
- Melvina Lathan
- Jeanette Salazar

== Relation to the IBHOF ==
The International Women's Boxing Hall of Fame has no working relations with the International Boxing Hall of Fame of Canastota, New York.

== See also ==
- Women Boxing Archive Network
