= Andrea DeShong =

American boxer

Personal information
- Born: March 16, 1962 (age 64) Mingo Junction, Ohio, United States
- Height: 5 ft 9 in (1.75 m)
- Weight: lightweight

Boxing career
- Stance: Orthodox

Boxing record
- Total fights: 24
- Wins: 13
- Losses: 9
- Draws: 1

Andrea DeShong (born March 16, 1962) is a former United States female boxer who is best remembered for defeating Christy Martin in Martin's fourth professional bout.

== Professional career ==
DeShong made her professional debut on March 11, 1989, when she beat Angel Horton by a first round knockout in Wheeling, West Virginia. After one more win, she faced the experienced Jamie Whitcomb, and also won this bout by a first-round knockout.

=== First fights with Martin ===
After winning two more fights, one by a second-round knockout, she and Martin met on November 4, at Bristol, Tennessee. DeShong inflicted Martin's first career defeat, winning by a five-round decision. Right after defeating Martin, she had a second victory against Whitcomb, who lasted five full rounds this time, before losing a unanimous decision to DeShong.

On April 21, 1990, she and Martin fought for the second time, and Martin avenged her defeat, while at the same time handing DeShong her own first loss as a professional, by a five-round decision, also at Bristol.

=== Rematch ===
It remains difficult for women boxers to find matches, and it was more difficult prior to the mid-'90s. DeShong ended up having a six-year layoff after the rematch with Martin. When she returned to boxing, she was somewhat known to fans, as Martin had become the WBC women's World Welterweight Champion, and DeShong remained the only boxer to defeat her as a professional. It helped DeShong regain prominence that Martin had become a symbol of women's boxing, having appeared in the cover of Sports Illustrated magazine and becoming a popular fighter by appearing on Showtime Network boxing undercards as well as pay-per-view boxing shows.

== Return ==
DeShong returned April 27, 1996, losing a four-round decision to Christine Butts. After two knockout wins against Jackie Rogers and one more win, she faced Kathy Collins, losing by a six-round unanimous decision at New York, New York.

After another win, she faced Isra Girgrah, on November 10, at Washington, D.C. The two fought to a six-round draw (tie).

After two more wins, she received her first world title try, on March 2, 1997, being knocked out by Jane Couch in seven rounds at New Orleans, Louisiana, for the WIBF's World Jr. Welterweight title.

Despite that setback, her next fight was a major event. As part of the undercard of the rematch between Evander Holyfield and Mike Tyson ("The Bite Fight"), which also featured former world champions Julio César Chávez and Miguel Ángel González, she and Martin met for a third time. The fight was preceded by much fan hype, and both boxers were involved in "trash talking" on the days leading to the match. Martin defeated DeShong by a seventh-round knockout on June 28.

DeShong lost to Lucia Rijker in her next fight, September 13, by a knockout in round three.

Despite losing three fights in a row, she found herself challenging Kathy Collins for the world title in her next fight. DeShong failed for the second time to win the world title, also losing for the fourth time in a row, when Collins handed her a ten-round unanimous decision loss on January 10, 1998, for the IWBF World Jr. Welterweight title.

After two more losses in a row, to Sumya Anani and Mitzi Jeter, she retired from boxing.

Some fans and critics have observed that, after she gave up boxing for the first time, she should not have returned. When she did return, in 1996, she was 34 years old, an age when most boxers and athletes in general are considered to be "past their prime".

Andrea DeShong had 13 wins, 9 losses and 1 draw in 24 bouts, with 8 knockout wins.

== Professional boxing record ==
23 fights	13 wins	9 losses
By knockout	8	3
By decision	5	6
Draws	1	

No.	Result	Record	Opponent	Type	Round, time	Date	Location	Notes
23	Loss		Mitzi Jeter	UD		1999-08-11	New Orleans, Louisiana, USA	
22	Loss		Sumya Anani	UD		1998-03-28	KC Market Center, Kansas City, Missouri, USA	
21	Loss		Kathy Collins	UD		1998-01-10	Tropicana Hotel & Casino, Atlantic City, New Jersey, USA	International Women's Boxing Federation World super lightweight title
20	Loss		Lucia Rijker	TKO		1997-09-13	Thomas & Mack Center, Las Vegas, Nevada, USA	
19	Loss		Christy Martin	TKO		1997-06-28	MGM Grand, Las Vegas, Nevada, USA	
18	Loss		Jane Couch	TKO		1997-03-02	UNO Lakefront Arena, New Orleans, Louisiana, USA	Women's International Boxing Federation World super lightweight title
17	Win		Helga Risoy	TKO		1997-02-12	Coeur d'Alene Casino, Worley, Idaho, USA	
16	Draw		Isra Girgrah	PTS		1996-10-10	Hilton Towers Hotel, Washington, District of Columbia, USA	
15	Win		Janet Green	TKO		1996-09-27	Mountaineer Casino Racetrack and Resort, Chester, West Virginia, USA	
14	Loss		Kathy Collins	UD		1996-08-20	Madison Square Garden Theater, New York, New York, USA	
13	Win		Stacey Prestage	UD		1996-06-22	Mark Etess Arena, Atlantic City, New Jersey, USA	
12	Win		Jackie Rodgers	TKO		1996-06-04	Martin's West, Woodlawn, Maryland, USA	
11	Win		Jackie Rodgers	TKO		1996-05-22	West Virginia, USA	
10	Loss		Christina Butts	PTS		1996-04-27	Mountaineer Casino Racetrack and Resort, Chester, West Virginia, USA	
9	Loss		Christy Martin	PTS		1990-04-21	Bristol, Tennessee, USA	
8	Win		Rose Noble	KO		1990-03-10	West Virginia, USA	
7	Win		Jamie Whitcomb	UD		1989-12-02	Valley Sports Arena, Roanoke, Virginia, USA	
6	Win		Christy Martin	MD		1989-11-04	Bristol, Tennessee, USA	
5	Win		Sharon Taylor	PTS		1989-09-08	Beckley, West Virginia, USA	
4	Win		Sharon Taylor	TKO		1989-09-08	Holiday Inn, Parkersburg, West Virginia, USA	
3	Win		Jamie Whitcomb	SD		1989-06-02	Holiday Inn, Parkersburg, West Virginia, USA	
2	Win		Danata Griffin	PTS		1989-04-08	Tennessee, USA	
1	Win		Angel Horton	KO		1989-03-11	Wheeling, West Virginia, USA	
