= Jane Couch =

English boxer

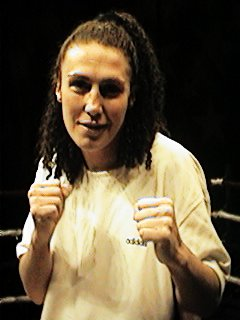
- Couch in 1998

Personal information
- Nickname: The Fleetwood Assassin
- Nationality: British
- Born: 14 August 1968 (age 58) Fleetwood, Lancashire, England
- Height: 5 ft 7 1/2 in (171 cm)
- Weight: Lightweight; Light-welterweight

Boxing career
- Stance: Orthodox

Boxing record
- Total fights: 39
- Wins: 28
- Win by KO: 9
- Losses: 11

Jane Couch (born 14 August 1968) is a British former professional boxer who competed from 1994 to 2007. She became the first licensed female boxer in the United Kingdom in 1998.

Couch was inducted into the International Boxing Hall of Fame as part of the class of 2024.

== Background ==
Born in Fleetwood, Lancashire, Couch was expelled from her school in Blackpool and thereafter lived "a life of booze, drugs and street fighting". At the age of 26 she saw a television documentary about women's boxing and decided to try it. In her first official fight, a Muay Thai match, she defeated a policewoman, about which she said "it was brilliant to flatten one [a police officer] and get paid for it".

== Professional boxing career ==
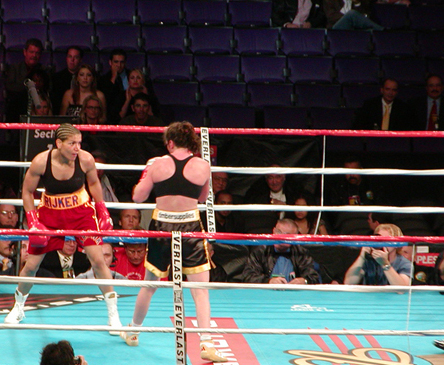
Lucia Rijker and Jane Couch boxing, 2003

The British Boxing Board of Control initially refused to grant Couch a professional licence on the sole ground that she was a woman, and argued that PMS made women too unstable to box. Claiming sexual discrimination and supported by the Equal Opportunities Commission, Couch managed to have this decision overturned by a tribunal in March 1998. However, some criticism followed as the British Medical Association called this result "a demented extension of equal opportunities".

Couch would later seek the right to fight a male opponent, but was unsuccessful. Of this, she said

Going into the ring against a man wouldn't bother me. I spar with blokes seven days a week so it's not as if it would be a new experience. It would mean an awful lot to me to appear at Wembley.

Couch's first major success occurred in only her fifth pro fight in 1996 when she won the WIBF light welterweight title by outpointing France's Sandra Geiger over ten rounds in Copenhagen, Denmark. Of this fight, Couch observed in 2004 that "I have never been hit so hard in all my life", and called Geiger "the toughest opponent (she) fought".

The first sanctioned professional boxing match between women in the U.K. was in November 1998 at Streatham in London, between Couch and Simona Lukic. Couch won.

Couch announced her retirement on 1 December 2008 and said she intended to continue as a boxing promoter. At the time, she said

"Boxing has been my life for a long time and it will always will be, but I'm not going to miss getting my head smashed in."

== Other achievements ==
In 2001, she published an autobiography, Jane Couch – Fleetwood Assassin.

Couch was appointed a Member of the Order of the British Empire (MBE) in the 2007 Queen's Birthday Honours.

In 2012, Couch was awarded the AOCA / Awakening Outstanding Contribution Award for her part played in raising public awareness and acceptance of female fighters.

In 2016, Couch was inducted into the International Women's Boxing Hall of Fame in Fort Lauderdale, Florida. The IWBHF was created and founded in 2014 by Sue TL Fox.

== Post-boxing career ==
In 2008 Couch competed in the reincarnation of Superstars.

On 20 December 2008 Couch co-promoted a promotion with Ricky Hatton in Bristol and then in February 2009 announced a more formal partnership with Hatton Promotions when she signed as boxing co-ordinator.

Couch long supported the inclusion of women's boxing in the Olympic Games, saying

"It's no more dangerous for a woman to box than for a man ... The Olympics would encourage more girls into gyms where hopefully they would be welcomed."

On 12 August 2009 it was reported that the International Olympic Committee appeared set to include the sport in the 2012 Summer Olympics.

In December 2009, Couch promoted a competition at the Marriott Hotel, Bristol.

Couch also has her own YouTube channel which features regular interviews with people involved in boxing.

== Professional boxing record ==
28 Wins (9 KOs), 11 Losses
Res.	Record	Opponent	Type	Round	Date	Location	Notes
Loss	28–11	(France) Anne Sophie Mathis	TKO	2 (6)	2007-12-08	La Palestre, Le Cannet, Alpes-Maritimes, France.	
Loss	28–10	(Canada) Jaime Clampitt	UD	10	2007-06-20	(United States) Foxwoods Resort, Mashantucket, Connecticut.	For vacant IWBF light welterweight title.
Loss	28–9	(United States) Holly Holm	UD	10	2006-09-23	(United States) Isleta Casino & Resort, Albuquerque, New Mexico.	
Win	28–8	(Ukraine) Viktoria Oliynyk	PTS	6	2006-05-06	(England) International Convention Centre, Birmingham, West Midlands.	
Win	27–8	(Bulgaria) Galina Gumliiska	TKO	3 (4)	2006-02-25	(England) Whitchurch Leisure Centre, Bristol, Avon.	
Loss	26–8	(France) Myriam Lamare	TKO	3 (10)	2005-12-05	Palais Omnisports, Bercy, France.	For vacant WIBF light welterweight title. For Women's WBA light welterweight title.
Win	26–7	(Latvia) Oksana Cernikova	PTS	6	2005-11-12	(England) Thistle Hotel, Bristol, Avon.	
Loss	25–7	(Canada) Jessica Rakoczy	TKO	6 (10)	2005-07-21	(United States) Palace Indian Gaming Center, Lemoore, California.	For vacant Women's WBC lightweight title.
Win	25–6	(Ukraine) Larysa Berezenko	PTS	6	2004-12-02	(England) Thistle Hotel, Bristol, Avon.	
Win	24–6	(Canada) Jaime Clampitt	UD	10	2004-06-12	(United States) Foxwoods Resort, Mashantucket, Connecticut.	Won IWBF light welterweight title.
Loss	23–6	(Belgium) Nathalie Toro	UD	10	2004-04-03	Vise, Liege, Belgium	For vacant Women's European light welterweight title
Win	23–5	(Bulgaria) Borislava Goranova	PTS	6	2004-02-29	(England) Marriott Hotel, Bristol, Avon	
Win	22–5	(United States) Brenda Drexel	PTS	8	2003-12-21	(England) Marriott Hotel, Bristol, Avon.	
Win	21–5	(United States) Brenda Drexel	PTS	10	2003-09-21	(England) Marriott Hotel, Bristol, Avon.	
Loss	20–5	(Netherlands) Lucia Rijker	UD	8	2003-09-21	(United States) Staples Center, Los Angeles.	
Win	20–4	(Ukraine) Larysa Berezenko	PTS	8	2003-05-15	(England) Hand Stadium, Bristol, Avon.	
Win	19–4	(Bulgaria) Borislava Goranova	TKO	7	2003-02-26	(England) Marriott Hotel, Bristol, Avon.	
Win	18–4	(Bulgaria) Borislava Goranova	UD	10	2002-12-08	(England) Thistle Hotel, Bristol, Avon.	
Win	17–4	(Bulgaria) Borislava Goranova	UD	6	2002-08-03	(England) Norbreck Castle Hotel, Blackpool, Lancashire.	
Loss	16–4	(United States) Sumya Anani	TKO	4 (10)	2002-06-21	(United States) Convention Center, Waco, Texas.	
Win	16–3	(Bulgaria) Tzanka Karova	TKO	3	2001-12-16	(England) Whitchurch Leisure Centre, Bristol, Avon.	
Win	15–3	(United States) Carla Witherspoon	UD	4	2001-07-28	Montego Bay, Jamaica.	
Win	14–3	(Ukraine) Viktoria Oliynyk	UD	4	2001-06-16	(England) Conference Centre, Wembley, London.	
Loss	13–3	(United States) Elizabeth Mueller	UD	6	2000-08-19	(United States) Foxwoods Resort, Mashantucket, Connecticut.	
Win	13–2	(Bulgaria) Galina Gumliiska	TKO	6 (10)	2000-07-01	(England) Elephant & Castle Centre, Southwark, London.	Retained WIBF light welterweight title.
Win	12–2	(South Africa) Michelle Strauss	TKO	3 (6)	2000-03-09	(England) York Hall, Bethnal Green, London.	
Win	11–2	(Australia) Sharon Anyos	UD	10	1999-10-31	(England) David Lloyd Tennis Centre, Raynes Park, London.	Won vacant WIBF light welterweight title.
Win	10–2	(Germany) Heike Noller	UD	8	1999-04-01	(England) Birmingham, West Midlands	
Win	9–2	(Netherlands) Marischa Sjauw	UD	10	1999-02-20	(England) Stockton on Tees, County Durham	Won WIBF light welterweight title.
Win	8–2	(Germany) Simona Lukic	TKO	2 (6)	1998-11-25	(England) Caesars Nightclub, Streatham, London	
Loss	7–2	(United States) Dora Webber	PTS	10	2001-06-20	(United States) Tropicana Hotel & Casino, Atlantic City, New Jersey	For vacant IWBF light welterweight title.
Loss	7–1	(United States) Dora Webber	SD	6	1997-10-24	(United States) Lula, Mississippi	
Win	7–0	(United States) Leah Mellinger	UD	10	1997-08-07	(United States) Foxwoods Resort, Mashantucket, Connecticut	Retained WIBF light welterweight title.
Win	6–0	(United States) Andrea DeShong	TKO	7 (10)	1997-03-02	(United States) New Orleans, Louisiana.	Retained WIBF light welterweight title.
Win	5–0	(France) Sandra Geiger	PTS	10	1996-05-31	K.B. Hallen, Copenhagen, Denmark	Won WIBF light welterweight title.
Win	4–0	Julia Shirley	PTS	6	1995-07-01	(England) Fleetwood, Lancashire	
Win	3–0	Jane Johnson	TKO	4 (6)	1995-04-01	(England) Speedway Stadium, Fleetwood, Lancashire	
Win	2–0	Fosteres Joseph	PTS	6	1995-01-01	(England) Fleetwood, Lancashire	
Win	1–0	Kalpna Shah	TKO	2 (6)	1994-10-30	(England) Wigan, Greater Manchester	Professional debut.

== See also ==
- List of female boxers
