= Bonnie Canino =

American boxer

- Born: 11 January 1962 (age 64); Florida, United States
- Other names: Dangerous
- Height: 5 ft 6 in (168 cm)
- Weight: 135 lb (61 kg; 9 st 9 lb)
- Division: Featherweight
- Reach: 70 in (178 cm)
- Style: Boxing
- Fighting out of: Coral Springs, Florida, United States
- Team: US-1 Fitness
- Trainer: Bert Rodriguez
- Rank: 1st degree Black belt in Kenpo; 1st degree Black belt in Taekwondo

Professional boxing record
- Total: 15
- Wins: 11
- By knockout: 5
- Losses: 4

Kickboxing record
- Total: 33
- Wins: 28
- Losses: 4
- Draws: 1

Other information
- Notable school: Coral Springs High School
- Boxing record from BoxRec

Bonnie Canino (born 11 January 1962) is a retired American boxer and kickboxer, and former world featherweight champion for two different associations. She also won world titles in kick boxing for two different associations.

She is the former IFBA World Feather weight champion and two time IBF World Featherweight title challenger. She is the former WAKO and World KICK Kickboxing Champion.

In 2014, Canino was inducted into the Women's International Boxing Hall of Fame in Fort Lauderdale, Florida.

Canino holds notable wins over Gloria Ramirez, Nora Daigle and Sue Chase in her career. She also lost bouts to Chevelle Hallback and Alicia Ashley.

== Personal life ==
After retiring in 1999 from professional boxing, she worked at a car dealership and managed Ada Vélez, the first Puerto Rican woman to become a world boxing champion, and Yvonne Reiss, the WBC Women's Middleweight World Champion who won the title in 2006.

Since retiring from prize fighting she has become a boxing coach. She later opened her own karate and boxing gym.

She has organized the Women’s National Golden Gloves tournament.

== Professional career ==
Bonnie Canino has in her professional kickboxing career had 35 fights, winning 28 of them. She was the KICK World Featherweight Champion, as well as the WAKO World Featherweight kickboxing champion between 1993 and 2000.

Alongside her kickboxing career, she participated in boxing bouts as well. She won her two fights, against April Griffith and Tina Speakman, by TKO and her third fight against Sue Chase by unanimous decision. She then challenged for the Women's IBF Featherweight title, but lost a unanimous decision against Deirdre Gogarty.

She would then challenge for the vacant IFBA Featherweight title against Beverly Szymanski, and win by unanimous decision. Her first title defense was a split decision win against Cora Webber.

She once against fought for the Women's IBF Featherweight title in 1998, but lost by way of TKO against Chevelle Hallback. Her second IFBA title defense was a unanimous decision win against Nora Daigle.

== Championships and accomplishments ==
- International Women's Boxing Hall of Fame
  - IWBHF Class of 2014 Hall of Fame Inductee
- International Female Boxers Association
  - IFBA World Featherweight Championship (126 lbs)
    - Two successful title defenses
- World Association of Kickboxing Organizations
  - WAKO World Featherweight Kickboxing Championship
- KICK Kickboxing
  - KICK World Featherweight Kickboxing Championship

== Professional boxing record ==
15 fights	11 wins	4 losses
By knockout	5	2
By decision	6	2
Draws	0	

No.	Result	Record	Opponent	Type	Round, time	Date	Location	Notes
15	Loss	11–4	(United States) Chevelle Hallback	TKO		4 June 2004	(United States) Chinook Winds Casino, Lincoln City, Oregon, USA	
14	Win	11–3	(Panama) Nayira Brown	TKO		29 September 1999	Gimnasio Nuevo Panama, Panama City, Panama	
13	Loss	10–3	(Jamaica) Alicia Ashley	UD		27 May 1999	(United States) Gold Strike Casino, Tunica, Mississippi, USA	
12	Win	10–2	(United States) Gina Davis	UD		25 March 1999	(United States) Kenner, Louisiana, USA	
11	Win	9–2	(United States) Sue Chase	UD		25 March 1999	(United States) New Orleans, Louisiana, USA	
10	Win	8–2	(United States) Carla Witherspoon	KO		12 September 1998	(United States) New Orleans, Louisiana, USA	
9	Win	7–2	(United States) Gloria Ramirez	UD		26 June 1998	(United States) Baton Rouge, Louisiana, USA	
8	Win	6–2	(United States) Nora Daigle	UD		26 June 1998	(United States) Bally's Las Vegas, Las Vegas, Nevada, USA	International Female Boxers Association World featherweight title
7	Loss	5–2	(United States) Chevelle Hallback	UD		6 March 1998	(United States) Memorial Auditorium, Fort Lauderdale, Florida, USA	International Female Boxers Association World featherweight title
6	Win	5–1	(United States) Cora Webber	SD		24 October 1997	(United States) Grand Casino, Biloxi, Mississippi, USA	International Female Boxers Association World featherweight title
5	Win	4–1	(United States) Beverly Szymanski	UD		2 August 1997	(United States) Grand Casino, Biloxi, Mississippi, USA	vacant International Female Boxers Association World featherweight title
4	Loss	3–1	(Republic of Ireland) Deirdre Gogarty	UD		2 March 1997	(United States) UNO Lakefront Arena, New Orleans, Louisiana, USA	Women's International Boxing Federation World featherweight title
3	Win	3–0	(United States) Sue Chase	PTS		23 November 1996	(United States) Grand Casino, Biloxi, Mississippi, USA	
2	Win	2–0	(United States) Tina Speakman	TKO		20 November 1996	(United States) War Memorial Auditorium, Fort Lauderdale, Florida, USA	
1	Win	1–0	(United States) April Griffith	TKO		16 January 1996	(United States) War Memorial Auditorium, Fort Lauderdale, Florida, USA	

== Kickboxing record ==
Kickboxing record
28 wins, 4 losses, 1 draw
Date	Result	Opponent	Event	Location	Method	Round	Time	Record
May 1995	Win	(Russia) Zulfia Koutdossova	?	?	Decision (Unanimous)	5	3:00	
November 1992	Win	(United States) Sandra Strong	?	United States	Decision (Unanimous)	5	3:00	
For the KICK World Featherweight Title.
23 November 1991	Win	(United States) Tammy Hudson	?	Rocky Point (Tampa), Florida, United States	Decision (Unanimous)	5	3:00	
1990	Loss	(United States) Kathy Long	?	France	Decision (Unanimous)	12	3:00	
1986	Win	(United States) Charli Carr	?	United States	Decision (Unanimous)	3	3:00	
1986	Win	(United States) Stacey Whirlwind	?	United States	TKO	5	3:00	
For the KICK World Featherweight Title.
1985	Win	(United States) Linda Bear	?	United States	Decision (Unanimous)	5	3:00	
Legend: Win Loss Draw/No contest Notes
