= Victoria Cisneros =

American boxer

Personal information
- Nickname: La Reina de Guerra
- Nationality: (United States) American
- Born: Victoria Ann Cisneros; April 17, 1985 (age 41) Albuquerque, New Mexico, United States
- Height: 1.65 m (5 ft 5 in)
- Weight: Lightweight

Boxing career
- Stance: Orthodox

Boxing record
- Total fights: 33
- Wins: 12
- Win by KO: 5
- Losses: 19
- Draws: 2

Victoria Cisneros (born April 17, 1985, in Albuquerque, New Mexico) is a female American boxer, who has fought six former or present World Champions in her career. She has three brothers, a twin sister and an older sister.

== Career ==
In her pro boxing career, she has fought some of the world's best boxers, such as Holly Holm, Mikaela Laurén, Melissa Hernández, Layla McCarter, Chevelle Hallback and Cecilia Brækhus.

She got the opportunity to fight Holly Holm, when Melissa Hernández and her team decided to pull out of the fight on December 4, 2009.

== Professional boxing record ==
33 fights	12 wins	19 losses
By knockout	5	6
By decision	7	13
Draws	2	

No.	Result	Record	Opponent	Type	Round, time	Date	Location	Notes
35	Loss	12-19-2	Kali Reis	TKO		02/19/16	Twin River Event Center, Lincoln, Rhode Island, United States	vacant UBF World middleweight title
34	Win	12-18-2	Yolanda Segura	TKO		12/04/15	Gymnacio Municipal, Irapuato, Guanajuato, Mexico	
33	Loss	11-18-2	Mikaela Laurén	TKO		06/06/15	Eriksdalshallen, Stockholm, Sweden	
32	Loss	11-17-2	Tori Nelson	UD		11/15/14		WIBA & vacant UBF World Welterweight Titles
31	Loss		Chevelle Hallback	TKO		08/22/14	St. Pete Times Forum, Tampa, Florida, United States	
30	Loss		Rola El-Halabi	UD		05/10/14	Ulm, Baden-Württemberg, Germany	
29	Win		Paty Ramirez	TKO		11/01/13	Auditorio Morelos, Aguascalientes, Mexico	
28	Win		Kita Watkins	UD		06/28/13	Convention Center, Albuquerque, New Mexico, United States	
27	Win		DJ Morrison	UD		04/05/13	Convention Center, Albuquerque, New Mexico, United States	
26	Loss		Mary McGee	TKO		12/07/12	Route 66 Casino, Albuquerque, New Mexico, United States	
25	Win		Silvia Zuniga	UD		11/10/12	El Chamizal, Puerto Penasco, Sonora, Mexico	
24	Win		DJ Morrison	TKO		10/27/12	Kiva Auditorium, Albuquerque, New Mexico, United States	
23	Win		Silvia Zuniga	KO		05/26/12	El Chamizal, Puerto Penasco, Sonora, Mexico	
22	NC		Adelita Irizarry	NC		2012-05-05	Mohegan Sun Casino, Uncasville	
21	Loss		Tatina Anderson	TKO		2011-11-20	Texas Station Casino, Las Vegas	
20	Loss		Holly Holm	UD		2011-06-10	Route 66 Casino, Albuquerque	
19	Loss		Chevelle Hallback	SD		2010-12-03	Route 66 Casino, Albuquerque	
18	Loss		Melissa Hernandez	UD		2010-08-14	Santa Ana Star Casino, Bernalillo	interim Women's International Boxing Association World Lightweight Title
17	Loss		Cecilia Brækhus	UD		2010-05-15	MCH Kongrescenter, Herning, Denmark	Retained WBA and WBC female welterweight titles; Won vacant WBO female welterweight title
16	Win		Letizia Guerrero	TKO		2010-04-24	West Las Vegas High School, Las Vegas	
15	Win		Terri Blair	MD		2010-03-26	Isleta Casino & Resort, Albuquerque	
14	Loss		Holly Holm	UD		2009-12-04	Isleta Casino & Resort, Albuquerque	vacant NABF Female Super Lightweight Title
13	Loss		Jacqueline Davis	MD		2009-09-11	Blue Horizon, Philadelphia	
12	Loss		(New Zealand) Daniella Smith	SD		2006-11-17	Sky City Convention Centre, Auckland	
11	Loss		Jill Emery	UD		2006-06-30	Blu Mega Club, El Paso	
10	NC		Molly McConnell	NC		2006-06-15	Seven Feathers Hotel & Casino Resort, Canyonville	
9	Loss		Layla McCarter	UD		04/01/06	Sky Ute Casino, Ignacio, Colorado, USA	
8	Loss		Ann Saccurato	UD		02/10/06	Iona College, New Rochelle, New York, United States	
7	Draw		Lisa Holewyne	PTS		08/26/05	Harrah's Rincon Casino, Valley Center, California, United States	
6	Draw		Crystal Hickerson	PTS		07/15/05	Fort McDowell Casino, Fountain Hills, Arizona, United States	
5	Loss	3-2	Ann Saccurato	UD		02/04/05	Westchester County Center, White Plains, New York, United States	
4	Win	3-1	Angie Poe	UD		11/20/04	Sky Ute Casino, Ignacio, Colorado, United States	
3	Win	2-1	Janae Archuleta	UD		2004-09-24	Kiva Auditorium, Albuquerque	
2	Loss	1-1	Crystal Hickerson	TKO		2004-05-28	Santa Ana Star Casino, Bernalillo	
1	Win	1-0	Wendy Baltazar	UD		2004-05-08	Dodge Theater, Phoenix	
