= Layla McCarter =

American boxer

Personal information
- Nickname: Amazing
- Born: Layla Eveleen McCarter; April 19, 1979 (age 47) Alameda, California, U.S.
- Height: 5 ft 4 in (163 cm)
- Weight: Featherweight; Super featherweight; Lightweight; Light welterweight; Welterweight; Light middleweight

Boxing career
- Reach: 65 1/2 in (166 cm)
- Stance: Orthodox

Boxing record
- Total fights: 65
- Wins: 47
- Win by KO: 13
- Losses: 13
- Draws: 5

Layla Eveleen McCarter (born April 19, 1979) is an American professional boxer.

== Career ==
She has held multiple world titles across five weight divisions, having held the WIBF welterweight title since 2018 and previously the IFBAfeatherweight title in 2000; the WIBF super lightweight title in 2003; the WBA female lightweight title twice between 2007 and 2009; and the WBA female super welterweight title in 2012.

In 2016 January Ring magazine considered Layla McCarter the 10th best female boxer of all time. She was also awarded by the Nevada and California Boxing Hall of Fame, and recently in February 2017 she was signed by Mayweather Promotions, as its second female boxer.

=== Public challenge to Ronda Rousey ===
On July 31, 2015, Ronda Rousey's trainer, Edmond Tarverdyan, expressed the belief that his fighter "can win the boxing world title" while discussing a potential fight with Cris Cyborg. After noting that "Ronda spars with boxing world champions that punch way harder than Cyborg", Tarverdyan claimed that she "has never lost a round in the gym. A round. With boxing world champions".

Layla McCarter is the current Big Knockout Boxing female champion and immediately challenged Ronda Rousey to boxing match.

Alongside Amanda Serrano went on to criticize Rousey's stand-up fighting technique stating in the Guardian “She’s very good at what she does, but she needs to stay in her lane because boxing takes a lot of experience to reach the top level.

“She better just stay in her lane because she’s going to get hurt.”.

== Professional boxing record ==
65 fights	46 wins	14 losses
By knockout	13	0
By decision	33	14
Draws	5	

No.	Result	Record	Opponent	Type	Round, time	Date	Location	Notes
65	Win	47–13–5	Paulina Cardona	TKO	4 (8)	Feb 1, 2025	Jiutepec, Mexico	
64	Win	46–13–5	Beatriz Aguilar	KO	4 (8)	Aug 17, 2024	Salon Rosas, Jiutepec, Mexico	
63	Win	45–13–5	Halanna Dos Santos	UD	10	Mar 25, 2022	Salon Santosha, Xochitepec, Mexico	Retained WIBF and GBU welterweight titles
62	Win	44–13–5	Beatriz Adriana Aguilar Jimenez	UD	8	Nov 7, 2020	Deportivo Cri-Cri, Cuernavaca, Mexico	
61	Win	43–13–5	Yamila Esther Reynoso	UD	10	Jan 17, 2019	MGM Grand Garden Arena, Paradise, Nevada, U.S.	
60	Win	42–13–5	Eva Bajic	UD	10	Jun 16, 2018	Wildparkstadion, Karlsruhe, Germany	Retained WIBF and GBU welterweight titles
59	Win	41–13–5	Victoria Cisneros	TKO	8 (10)	Mar 3, 2018	Sky Ute Casino, Ignacio, California, U.S.	Won vacant WIBF and GBU welterweight titles
58	Win	40–13–5	Erika Jeanette Hernandez	UD	8	Dec 22, 2017	Deportivo Lázaro Cardenas, Mexico City, Mexico	
57	Win	39–13–5	Szilvia Szabados	TKO	7 (8)	Apr 29, 2017	Sam's Town Hotel & Gambling Hall, Sunrise Manor, Nevada, U.S.	
56	Win	38–13–5	Melissa Hernandez	UD	8	Jul 16, 2016	Legacy Arena, Birmingham, Alabama, U.S.	
55	Win	37–13–5	Yolanda Segura	TKO	1 (10)	Apr 16, 2016	Arena Neza, Ciudad Nezahualcóyotl, Mexico	
54	Win	36–13–5	Melissa Hernandez	UD	8	Nov 21, 2014	The Orleans, Paradise, Nevada, U.S.	
53	Win	35–13–5	Noni Tenge	TKO	8 (10)	Sep 30, 2012	Orient Theatre, East London, South Africa	Won vacant WBA light-middleweight title
52	Win	34–13–5	Belinda Laracuente	UD	8	Aug 13, 2011	Sky Ute Casino, Ignacio, Colorado, U.S.	
51	Win	33–13–5	Cimberly Harris	UD	6	Feb 12, 2011	Sky Ute Casino, Ignacio, Colorado, U.S.	
50	Win	32–13–5	Emiko Raika	UD	10	Jul 3, 2009	South Point Hotel Casino, Enterprise, Nevada, U.S.	Retained WBA and GBU lightweight titles
49	Win	31–13–5	Loli Munoz	UD	10	Aug 15, 2008	The Orleans, Paradise, Nevada, U.S.	Retained GBU lightweight title
48	Win	30–13–5	Jelena Mrdjenovich	SD	10	Mar 28, 2008	Shaw Conference Centre, Edmonton, Alberta, Canada	Retained WBA lightweight title
47	Win	29–13–5	Dominga Olivo	RTD	3 (8)	Mar 7, 2008	The Orleans, Paradise, Nevada, U.S.	Won vacant GBU lightweight title
46	Win	28–13–5	Cindy Serrano	UD	6	Jan 11, 2008	The Orleans, Paradise, Nevada, U.S.	
45	Win	27–13–5	Tammy Franks	TKO	3 (6)	Nov 10, 2007	Sky Ute Casino, Ignacio, Colorado, U.S.	
44	Win	26–13–5	Daniella Smith	UD	6	Nov 2, 2007	Sky City Convention Centre, Auckland, New Zealand	
43	Win	25–13–5	Dominga Olivo	MD	8	Jun 9, 2007	Sky Ute Casino, Ignacio, Colorado, U.S.	
42	Win	24–13–5	Angelica Martinez	UD	6	May 25, 2007	The Orleans, Paradise, Nevada, U.S.	
41	Loss	23–13–5	Melissa Hernandez	UD	8	Apr 27, 2007	The Orleans, Paradise, Nevada, U.S.	Lost GBU lightweight title
40	Win	23–12–5	Melissa Hernandez	RTD	8 (12)	Feb 14, 2007	The Orleans, Paradise, Nevada, U.S.	Retained GBU lightweight title
39	Win	22–12–5	Donna Biggers	TKO	2 (12)	Jan 5, 2007	The Orleans, Paradise, Nevada, U.S.	Retained GBU lightweight title; Won inaugural WBA lightweight title
38	Win	21–12–5	Belinda Laracuente	UD	10	Nov 17, 2006	The Orleans, Paradise, Nevada, U.S.	Won vacant GBU lightweight title
37	Draw	20–12–5	Dakota Stone	MD	8	Oct 7, 2006	Lucky Eagle Casino, Rochester, Washington, U.S.	
36	Win	20–12–4	Shadina Pennybaker	RTD	5 (6)	Jun 24, 2006	Sky Ute Casino, Ignacio, Colorado, U.S.	
35	Win	19–12–4	Victoria Cisneros	UD	6	Apr 1, 2006	Sky Ute Casino, Ignacio, Colorado, U.S.	
34	Loss	18–12–4	Jelena Mrdjenovich	UD	8	Jun 18, 2005	Shaw Conference Centre, Edmonton, Alberta, Canada	
33	Win	18–11–4	Jelena Mrdjenovich	UD	6	Feb 12, 2005	Ramada Kingsway Inn, Edmonton, Alberta, Canada	
32	Loss	17–11–4	Chevelle Hallback	UD	10	Jul 2, 2004	Pala Casino Spa Resort, Pala, California, U.S.	For vacant WIBA super-featherweight title
31	Loss	17–10–4	Mary Jo Sanders	UD	6	Apr 16, 2004	Gund Arena, Cleveland, Ohio, U.S.	
30	Win	17–9–4	Lisa Holewyne	UD	10	Oct 4, 2003	Swinomish Northern Lights Casino, Anacortes, Washington, U.S.	Won vacant WIBF, and GBU light-welterweight titles
29	Win	16–9–4	Claudia Valenciana	UD	6	Jun 14, 2004	Stratosphere Hotel & Casino, Las Vegas, Nevada, U.S.	
28	Win	15–9–4	Lisa Lewis	UD	6	Apr 18, 2003	Tachi Palace, Lemoore, California, U.S.	
27	Win	14–9–4	Tracy Byrd	SD	6	Mar 7, 2003	City Center Pavilion, Reno, Nevada, U.S.	
26	Win	13–9–4	Tracy Byrd	MD	6	Feb 15, 2003	Caesars Palace, Paradise, Nevada, U.S.	
25	Loss	12–9–4	Chevelle Hallback	UD	10	Dec 28, 2002	Johnny Mercer Theater, Savannah, Georgia, U.S.	
24	Win	12–8–4	Blanca Luna	MD	4	Dec 6, 2002	Edgewater Hotel and Casino, Laughlin, Nevada, U.S.	
23	Loss	11–8–4	Kelsey Jeffries	UD	10	Nov 7, 2002	Centennial Garden Arena, Bakersfield, California, U.S.	Lost IFBA featherweight title
22	Draw	11–7–4	Ada Velez	MD	6	Jul 18, 2002	Rose Garden, Portland, Oregon, U.S.	
21	Win	11–7–3	Miki Kikukawa	UD	4	Jul 13, 2002	The Aladdin, Paradise, Nevada, U.S.	
20	Win	10–7–3	Emiko Raika	MD	8	Apr 29, 2002	Shimokita Town Hall, Tokyo, Japan	
19	Loss	9–7–3	Sandra Yard	UD	10	Apr 13, 2002	Sky Ute Casino, Ignacio, Colorado, U.S.	For vacant IFBA super-featherweight title
18	Loss	9–6–3	Jessica Rakoczy	UD	6	Feb 17, 2002	Stardust Resort and Casino, Winchester, Nevada, U.S.	
17	Draw	9–5–3	Alicia Ashley	PTS	6	Jan 13, 2002	Venetian Hotel & Casino, Paradise, Nevada, U.S.	
16	Win	9–5–2	Tracy Byrd	UD	10	Jul 7, 2001	Sky Ute Casino, Ignacio, Colorado, U.S.	Retained IFBA featherweight title
15	Draw	8–5–2	Jo Wyman	PTS	10	May 19, 2001	Sky Ute Casino, Ignacio, Colorado, U.S.	Retained IFBA featherweight title
14	Win	8–5–1	Marilyn Salcido	UD	4	Mar 9, 2001	Reno Hilton, Reno, Nevada, U.S.	
13	Loss	7–5–1	Melissa Del Valle	UD	6	Jan 17, 2001	Yonkers Raceway, Yonkers, New York, U.S.	
12	Win	7–4–1	Sandra Yard	UD	10	Oct 7, 2000	Sky Ute Casino, Ignacio, Colorado, U.S.	Won IFBA featherweight title
11	Win	6–4–1	Jamie Day	TKO	1 (4)	Aug 24, 2000	Coeur d'Alene Casino, Worley, Idaho, U.S.	
10	Win	5–4–1	Linda Tenberg	UD	6	Aug 4, 2000	Ben Hur Shrine Temple, Austin, Texas, U.S.	
9	Win	4–4–1	Jessica Treat	UD	4	July 22, 2000	Civic Center, Maywood, California, U.S.	
8	Win	3–4–1	Elena Reid	UD	4	July 16, 2000	Arizona Charlie's, Las Vegas, Nevada, U.S.	
7	Win	2–4–1	Shelley Lay	TKO	3 (4)	Apr 29, 2000	Peppermill Hotel & Casino, Reno, Nevada, U.S.	
6	Loss	1–4–1	Laura Serrano	SD	4	Jul 26, 1999	Great Western Forum, Inglewood, California, U.S.	
5	Draw	1–3–1	Tamara Hudgins	MD	4	Jun 17, 1999	Coeur d'Alene Casino, Worley, Idaho, U.S.	
4	Loss	1–3	Margaret MacGregor	MD	4	Apr 24, 1999	Arts Museum, Portland, Oregon, U.S.	
3	Loss	1–2	Margaret MacGregor	SD	4	Apr 3, 1999	Kitsap Pavilion, Bremerton, Washington, U.S.	
2	Loss	1–1	Sandra Yard	UD	4	Feb 4, 1999	Coeur d'Alene Casino, Worley, Idaho, U.S	
1	Win	1–0	Deshawn Mohammed	UD	4	Sep 23, 1998	Coeur d'Alene Casino, Worley, Idaho, U.S	

== See also ==
- List of female boxers

Sporting positions
Minor world boxing titles
Preceded by Sandra Yard	IFBA featherweight champion October 7, 2000 – November 7, 2002	Succeeded by Kelsey Jeffries
New title	GBU light-welterweight champion October 4, 2003 – 2004; Vacated	Vacant Title next held by Belinda Laracuente
Vacant Title last held by Agnieszka Rylik	WIBF light-welterweight champion October 4, 2003 – 2004; Vacated	Vacant Title next held by Agnieszka Rylik
New title	GBU lightweight champion November 17, 2006 – April 27, 2007	Succeeded by Melissa Hernández
Vacant Title last held by Melissa Hernández	GBU lightweight champion March 7, 2008 – 2010; Vacated	Vacant Title next held by Lucia Morelli
Vacant Title last held by Verena Kaiser	GBU welterweight champion March 3, 2018 – 2022; Vacated	Vacant
Vacant Title last held by Verena Kaiser	WIBF welterweight champion March 3, 2018 – 2022; Vacated	Vacant
Major world boxing titles
Inaugural champion	WBA lightweight champion January 5, 2007 – 2011; Vacated	Vacant Title next held by Alejandra Oliveras
Vacant Title last held by Giselle Salandy	WBA light-middleweight champion September 30, 2012 – 2014; Vacated	Vacant Title next held by Hanna Gabriels
