= Chevelle Hallback =

American boxer (born 1971)

Chevelle Lynvette Hallback
Personal information
- Nickname: Fist of Steel
- Born: Chevelle Lynvette Hallback; September 3, 1971 (age 55) Plant City, Florida, U.S.
- Height: 1.70 m (5 ft 7 in)
- Weight: Welterweight

Boxing career
- Stance: Orthodox

Boxing record
- Total fights: 43
- Wins: 32
- Win by KO: 13
- Losses: 8
- Draws: 2
- No contests: 1

Chevelle Lynvette Hallback (born September 3, 1971) is a female boxer from Plant City, Florida. Hallback, nicknamed "Fist of Steel", has been featured on television many times, usually fighting the biggest names in the sport. Hallback is among the most recognized female boxers in the world.

== Career ==
Hallback began her professional boxing career on February 21, 1997, beating Connie Plosser by a first round knockout in Miami. In just her second fight, Hallback faced Lucia Rijker, who many considered the best pound-for-pound female boxer in the world at the time. Hallback was defeated by Rijker on March 22, losing by a fifth round technical knockout. Although she lost the fight, Hallback gave Rijker some trouble before Rijker's experience and conditioning edge took over.

After two consecutive wins, she fought for her first world title, and, on February 6, 1998, she became the WIBF's world Featherweight champion by knocking out Bonnie Canino in seven rounds.

In 1999, she only had one fight, which resulted in a non-title defense win. She challenged for her second world title, the IFBA world Jr. Lightweight title, when she faced Doris Hackl on April 26, 2000 in Kenner, Louisiana. Hallback failed to win the title by dropping a ten round majority decision to Hackl. Many people who saw that fight, including the TV commentators, thought Hallback did enough to win the fight. Her next fight was also very important, as she faced Laura Serrano on July 8, 2001 in Las Vegas, Nevada. Despite having been out of the ring for fifteen months before this fight, Hallback lost a six round majority decision to the Mexican fighter.

Four months later, on November 16, she fought for the WIBA world Jr. Lightweight title, in Austin, Texas, against Snodene Blakeney but had to settle for a 2nd round technical draw when Blakeney was accidentally cut by a headbutt. This was followed by two back to back wins over Brenda Drexel.

After two more wins, including a fourth round knockout of Drexel in their third bout, she challenged Alicia Ashley for the IBA world Jr. Lightweight title, on August 27, 2002, at Savannah, Georgia. Hallback outpointed Ashley over ten rounds.

Her next three bouts were non title affairs, and Hallback won each of them in two rounds or less.

She would have defended her IBA world Jr. Lightweight title for the first time on December 28, 2002, against Layla McCarter in Savannah. McCarter, however, suffered an injury during training one week prior to the fight. The promoters could not find an opponent, and McCarter decided to go on with the fight as scheduled, but the IBA decided it would be another non-title fight. Hallback won by a ten round unanimous decision.

Next, Hallback faced the ex-welterweight champ Mitzi Jeter twice in a row, beating her each time by six round unanimous decisions. On May 31, 2003, she met Britt Van Buskirk, winning by a six round decision, and Brenda Drexel for a fourth time, defeating Drexel by a six round decision.

Her next fight, against Melissa Del Valle, was a long-awaited match-up. Hallback retained the IBA Jr. Lightweight title with a ten round unanimous decision on August 30, and she followed that victory with a first round knockout win over Michelle Ewing.

Her luck ran out, however, when she moved up 10 pounds and 2 weight classes to meet Mary Jo Sanders on May 20, 2004, for the IBA continental Jr. Welterweight title, when she lost a ten round decision to the much bigger Sanders.

Hallback returned to 130 pounds, and back to her winning ways June 4, when she was rematched with Canino, in Oregon. Hallback won by a fourth round knockout.

Her next fight was another rematch, as she was finally able to defend her IBA Jr. Lightweight title against McCarter, on July 2, at San Diego, California. Hallback retained the title by a ten round unanimous decision.

Hallback then travelled to Tokyo Japan, and on March 13, 2005, she beat Emiko Raika by 10 round unanimous decision to win the WIBA Super Featherweight World Title.

On November 18, 2005, in Edmonton Alberta Canada, Hallback won a 10-round unanimous decision over Belinda Laracuente, defending her WIBA title.

On 7 May 2011, she faced undefeated Norwegian boxer, Cecilia Brækhus, in Copenhagen.

== Professional boxing record ==
32 Wins (13 knockouts, 20 decisions), 8 Losses, 2 Draws
Res.	Record	Opponent	Type	Rd., Time	Date	Location	Notes
Win	32–8–2	(Hungary) Szilvia Szabados	Decision (unanimous)	6	2019-11-02	Sun Dome, Tampa, Florida	
Win	31–8–2	(Hungary) Szilvia Szabados	Decision (unanimous)	6	2019-09-21	Marriott Clearwater, Saint Petersburg, Florida	
Win	30–8–2	(United States) Victoria Cisneros	TKO	8 (10)	2014-08-22	St. Pete Times Forum, Tampa, Florida	vacant WBF World Female Welterweight Title
Win	29–8–2	(United States) Dominga Olivo	TKO	2 (6)	2014-06-13	St. Pete Times Forum, Tampa, Florida	
Loss	28–8–2	(France) Myriam Lamare	Decision (unanimous)	10	2011-11-05	Palais des Sports, Toulon, France	vacant IBF World Female Super Lightweight Title
Loss	28–7–2	(Norway) Cecilia Brækhus	Decision (unanimous)	10	2011-05-07	Koncerthuset, Copenhagen, Denmark	WBA, WBC & WBO Welterweight Title
Win	28–6–2	(United States) Victoria Cisneros	Decision (split)	8	2010–12-03	Route 66 Casino, Albuquerque, New Mexico	
Loss	27–6–2	(United States) Holly Holm	Decision (unanimous)	10	2010-03–26	Isleta Casino & Resort, Albuquerque, New Mexico	
Win	27–5–2	(Canada) Jeannine Garside	Decision (split)	10	2008-06–13	Isleta Casino & Resort, Albuquerque, New Mexico	vacant WBAN World Lightweight & vacant IFBA World Lightweight Titles
Draw	26–5–2	(Puerto Rico) Melissa Hernández	Points	10	2008-02-07	Pechanga Resort & Casino, Temecula, California	
Win	26–5–1	(United States) Terri Blair	Decision (unanimous)	8	2007-07-02	Pechanga Resort & Casino, Temecula, California	
Loss	25–5–1	(United States) Holly Holm	Decision (unanimous)	10	2007-05–23	Tingley Coliseum, Albuquerque, New Mexico	
Win	25–4–1	(Puerto Rico) Belinda Laracuente	Decision (unanimous)	10	2005–11–18	Shaw Conference Centre, Edmonton, Alberta, Canada	WIBA Super Featherweight Title
NC	24–4–1	(Puerto Rico) Melissa Del Valle	No decision	3	2005-10–07	A La Carte Event Pavilion, Tampa, Florida	
Win	24–4–1	(Japan) Emiko Raika	Decision (unanimous)	10	2005–03–13	Velfarre, Roppongi, Tokyo, Japan	WIBA Super Featherweight Title
Win	23–4–1	(United States) Kim Colbert	TKO	2	2005-01–26	A La Carte Event Pavilion, Kansas City, Missouri	
Win	22–4–1	(United States) Layla McCarter	Decision (unanimous)	10	2004-07-02	Pala Casino, Pala, California	WIBA Super Featherweight Title
Win	21–4–1	(United States) Bonnie Canino	TKO	4	2004-06–04	Chinook Winds Casino, Lincoln City, Oregon	
Loss	20–4–1	(United States) Mary Jo Sanders	Points	10	2004-05–20	Kewadin Casino, Sault Sainte Marie, Michigan	
Win	20–3–1	(United States) Michelle Ewing	TKO	1	2003-09–20	(Georgia (U.S. state)) Jarrell's Gym, Savannah, Georgia	
Win	19–3–1	(Puerto Rico) Melissa Del Valle	Decision (unanimous)	10	2003-08–30	(Georgia (U.S. state)) Civic Center, Savannah, Georgia	IBA Super Featherweight Title
Win	18–3–1	(United States) Brenda Drexel	Decision (unanimous)	6	2003-06–28	(Georgia (U.S. state)) Jarrell's Gym, Savannah, Georgia	
Win	17–3–1	(United States) Britt Van Buskirk	Decision (unanimous)	6	2003-05–31	(Georgia (U.S. state)) Jarrell's Gym, Savannah, Georgia	
Win	16–3–1	(United States) Mitzi Jeter	Decision (unanimous)	6	2003-04–26	(Georgia (U.S. state)) Jarrell's Gym, Savannah, Georgia	
Win	15–3–1	(United States) Mitzi Jeter	Decision (unanimous)	6	2003-03–29	(Georgia (U.S. state)) Jarrell's Gym, Savannah, Georgia	
Win	14–3–1	(United States) Layla McCarter	Decision (unanimous)	10	2002-12–28	(Georgia (U.S. state)) Johnny Mercer Theater, Savannah, Georgia	
Win	13–3–1	(United States) Willicia Moorehead	KO	1	2002-11–22	(Georgia (U.S. state)) Civic Center, Savannah, Georgia	
Win	12–3–1	(United States) Vicky Clardy	KO	1	2002-10–20	(Georgia (U.S. state)) Civic Center, Savannah, Georgia	
Win	11–3–1	(Puerto Rico) Vanessa Pine	KO	2	2002-09–27	(Georgia (U.S. state)) Civic Center, Savannah, Georgia	
Win	10–3–1	(Jamaica) Alicia Ashley	Decision (unanimous)	10	2002-08–27	(Georgia (U.S. state)) Civic Center, Savannah, Georgia	IBA Super Featherweight Title
Win	9–3–1	(United States) Brenda Drexel	TKO	4	2002-06–29	(Georgia (U.S. state)) Civic Center, Savannah, Georgia	
Win	8–3–1	(United States) Carla Witherspoon	Decision (unanimous)	6	2002-06–04	(Georgia (U.S. state)) Morrell Park, Savannah, Georgia	
Win	7–3–1	(United States) Brenda Drexel	Decision (unanimous)	6	2002-04–27	(Georgia (U.S. state)) Jarrell's Gym, Savannah, Georgia	
Win	6–3–1	(United States) Brenda Drexel	Decision (unanimous)	6	2002-03–22	(Georgia (U.S. state)) Civic Center, Savannah, Georgia	
Draw	5–3–1	(United States) Snodene Blakeney	Decision (technical)	3	2001-11–16	Convention Center, Austin, Texas	WIBA Super Featherweight Title
Loss	5–3	(Mexico) Laura Serrano	Decision (majority)	6	2001-07–08	Texas Station Casino, North Las Vegas, Nevada	
Loss	5–2	(Canada) Doris Hackl	Decision (majority)	10	2000-04–26	New Orleans, Louisiana	IFBA Super Featherweight Title
Win	5–1	(Puerto Rico) Hayde Nuñez	Decision (unanimous)	4	1999-06–11	Bossier City, Louisiana	
Win	4–1	(United States) Bonnie Canino	TKO	7	1998-03–06	Memorial Auditorium, Fort Lauderdale, Florida	WIBF Featherweight Title
Win	3–1	(United States) Bethany Payne	TKO	1	1997-09–20	Round 1 Gym, Boca Raton, Florida	
Win	2–1	(United States) Judy Mayrand	TKO	1	1997-05–21	Tallahassee, Florida	
Loss	1–1	(Netherlands) Lucia Rijker	TKO	5	1997-03–22	Memorial Coliseum, Corpus Christi, Texas	
Win	1-0	(United States) Connie Plosser	TKO	1	1997-02–21	Mahi Temple Shrine Auditorium, Miami, Florida	

== Mixed martial arts record ==
Professional record breakdown
2 matches	1 win	1 loss
By knockout	1	0
By submission	0	1
By decision	0	0

Res.	Record	Opponent	Method	Event	Date	Round	Time	Location	Notes
Loss	1–1	Sarah Wilson	Submission (triangle choke)	XFC 7	February 20, 2009	1	3:03	Knoxville, Tennessee, United States	
Win	1–0	Melissa Vasquez	TKO (punches)	XFC 6	December 5, 2008	1	0:41	Tampa, Florida, United States	
