= Jenifer Alcorn =

American boxer

Personal information
- Born: Jennifer Lynn Alcorn; July 15, 1970 (age 55) San Luis Obispo, California, United States
- Weight: Lightweight

Boxing career
- Stance: orthodox

Boxing record
- Total fights: 18
- Wins: 18
- Win by KO: 11
- Losses: 0
- Draws: 0
- No contests: 0

Jenifer Lynn Alcorn (born July 15, 1970) is an American retired, undefeated WIBA, IWBF, and IBA World Champion female professional boxer. She was inducted into the International Women's Boxing Hall of Fame in 2023.

== Early life and education ==
Alcorn grew up in Le Grand, California, and later moved to Fresno. She was well known in Fresno athletic circles before beginning her career as a boxer. She was a stand-out high school athlete and attended California State University, Fresno.

== Athletic career ==
Despite only having six amateur bouts, Alcorn fought in the women's nationals, 1999 USA Boxing National Championships, losing a 10–1 decision to eventual silver medalist Jean Martin of Brooklyn, N.Y. in the 139 pound quarterfinals.

Alcorn then launched a professional boxing career. She made her pro debut on July 2, 1999, in Fresno, where she TKO'd Robyn Covino in 0:59 seconds of the first round.

Alcorn eventually stepped up her level of competition by taking on undefeated Jessica Rakoczy, for the vacant IWBF Lightweight title. Alcorn won a ten-round split (96-94 92-98 98-92) decision over Rakoczy, by carrying the fight to Rakoczy aggressively.

On April 19, 2003, at Selland Arena in Fresno, Alcorn won an eight-round unanimous (78-74 77-75 77-75) decision over Mia St. John.

On December 11, 2003, at Palace Indian Gaming Center in Lemoore, California, Alcorn won a ten-round split (96-93 96-93 94-95) decision over Melissa Del Valle for the vacant WIBA Lightweight title. Alcorn was knocked down by a left hook in the second round, and Del Valle landed effectively with overhand rights throughout the bout. However, Del Valle faded in the late going and Alcorn won the critical late rounds. Alcorn remained undefeated at 18-0-0 (11 KO) while Del Valle fell to 28-4-1 (11 KO).

Soon after the Del Valle fight, Alcorn announced her retirement from boxing on February 5, 2004, citing the stress that her boxing career placed on her children. saying "After eight years of training, I know I'll feel the effects of walking away, but I've seen fighters stay in too long, and I've seen the effect it has on their mind and body. By going out on top, the worst I'll be is a former 3-time World Champion. Every good thing has to come to an end." She said she would continue her work with the Fresno State women's basketball team and her fitness training business.

== Personal life ==
Alcorn and her family appeared on the October 9, 2006, episode of the U.S. version of Wife Swap.

Alcorn established and manages Team JIB JAB, a fitness program utilizing a "bootcamp" instructional model. The curriculum focuses on physical exercise and dietary management as primary methods for personal health improvement.

== Professional boxing record ==
18 fights	18 wins	0 losses
By knockout	11	0
By decision	7	0
Draws	0	

No.	Result	Record	Opponent	Type	Round, time	Date	Location	Notes
18	Win		Melissa Del Valle	SD		2003-12-11	Palace Indian Gaming Center, Lemoore, California, US	vacant Women's International Boxing Association World lightweight title
17	Win		Franchesca Alcanter	TKO		2003-10-02	Palace Indian Gaming Center, Lemoore, California, US	
16	Win		Mia St. John	UD		Apr 19, 2003	Selland Arena, Fresno, California, US	
15	Win		Jessica Rakoczy	SD		2003-01-17	Palace Indian Gaming Center, Lemoore, California, US	vacant International Women's Boxing Federation World lightweight title
14	Win		Cheryl Nance	TKO		2002-09-29	Palace Indian Gaming Center, Lemoore, California, US	
13	Win		Susan Mullett	TKO		2002-04-26	Palace Indian Gaming Center, Lemoore, California, US	vacant Women's International Boxing Federation World lightweight title
12	Win		Carla Witherspoon	UD		2002-02-01	Palace Indian Gaming Center, Lemoore, California, US	
11	Win		Lisa Lewis	UD		2002-01-17	Centennial Garden Arena, Bakersfield, California, US	
10	Win		Carla Witherspoon	UD		2001-11-15	Centennial Garden Arena, Bakersfield, California, US	
9	Win		Jessica La Pointe	TKO		2001-06-24	Coeur d'Alene Casino, Worley, Idaho, US	
8	Win		Kimberly Reed	K0		2001-04-13	Spa Resort Casino, Palm Springs, California, US	
7	Win		Lisa Lovell	KO		2000-10-13	Spa Resort Casino, Palm Springs, California, US	
6	Win		Willicia Moorehead	TKO		2000-09-10	Peppermill Hotel & Casino, Reno, Nevada, US	
5	Win		Imelda Arias	TKO		2000-07-28	Selland Arena, Fresno, California, US	
4	Win		Kanako Kudo	TKO		2000-05-11	Table Mountain Casino, Friant, California, US	
3	Win		Kelly Whaley	UD		2000-03-31	Spa Resort Casino, Palm Springs, California, US	
2	Win		Chris Sepulvado	TKO		1999-09-04	Casino West, Yerington, Nevada, US	
1	Win		Robyn Covino	TKO		1999-07-02	Fresno Fair Pavilion, Fresno, California, US	
