= Myriam Lamare =

French boxer (born 1975)

- Born: January 1, 1975 (age 51); Saint-Denis, France
- Nationality: French
- Height: 5 ft 6 in (1.68 m)
- Weight: 140 lb (64 kg; 10 st)
- Division: Featherweight
- Reach: 70.0 in (178 cm)
- Style: Boxing
- Stance: Orthodox

Professional boxing record
- Total: 26
- Wins: 22
- By knockout: 10
- Losses: 4

Mixed martial arts record
- Total: 1
- Wins: 1
- By decision: 1
- Losses: 0

Other information
- Boxing record from BoxRec
- Mixed martial arts record from Sherdog

Myriam Lamare (born 1 January 1975, in Saint-Denis) is a French female boxer who won world titles in the World Boxing Association (WBA), World Boxing Federation (WBF), and International Boxing Federation (IBF).

== Biography ==
Myriam Lamare was born to a French father and an Algerian mother. She spent her childhood in Aubervilliers, France. She left school at age 17, hoping to help support her family, and began boxing as an amateur because her parents did not have the means to enroll her in a club. She went on to practice athletics, full-contact karate, and boxing.

While working in a catering job in Martinique, Lamare trained in contact sports such as full-contact kickboxing. Her unexpected break happened at a facility in Fort-de-France, when she was seen by an expert coach visiting from Hatman Miloudi, a French boxing club in Bobigny. He helped Lamare develop from a regional-level fighter to elite status in a recognized national federation, the French Federation of Savate (French boxing).

When Lamare was awarded the title of vice-champion of France, she left Martinique and moved to Marseille for better training conditions. As an amateur, her record was 45 fights, 42 wins.

In November 2004, Lamare became the world champion in the super lightweight category, beating the United States' Eliza Olson. She became the first female world champion recognized by the World Boxing Association. On 29 April 2005, she defended her title by beating Ukraine's Elena Tverdokhleb before 7,000 spectators at the Palais des Sports in Marseille.

It was during the sixth defense of her world title on 2 December 2006 in Paris that Lamare, who had earned a reputation as a "killer" in the ring, met Anne Sophie Mathis for the first time. Lamare lost by referee stoppage in the sixth round. The match was voted female fight of the year by Ring Magazine. A rematch was held in Marseille on 29 June 2007, and the result was the same: Mathis dominated all 10 rounds.

On 23 January 2009, Lamare lost to Holly Holm, the reigning Women's International Boxing Association (WIBA) welterweight champion. However, on 9 October 2009, she won the vacant position of WBF welterweight champion, beating Ann Saccurato of the United States.

On 5 November 2011, Lamare became the IBF super lightweight world champion by defeating Chevelle Hallback in Toulon, France.

Lamare announced her retirement from professional boxing in February 2014. She was inducted into the International Women's Boxing Hall of Fame in 2018.

== Professional boxing record ==
26 fights	22 wins	4 losses
By knockout	10	1
By decision	12	3

No.	Result	Record	Opponent	Type	Round, time	Date	Location	Notes
26	Loss	22–4	Cecilia Brækhus	UD	10	Feb 1, 2014	Arena Nord, Frederikshavn, Denmark	For WBA, WBC & WBO welterweight titles
25	Win	22–3	Loli Munoz	PTS	8	Nov 30, 2013	Halle Monconseil, Tours, France	
24	Win	21–3	Floarea Lihet	PTS	8	Oct 20, 2012	Salle Schmitt, Sedan, France	
23	Win	20–3	Chevelle Hallback	UD	10	Nov 5, 2011	Palais des Sports de Toulon, Toulon, France	Won inaugural IBF light-welterweight title
22	Win	19–3	Lely Luz Florez	UD	10	Sep 9, 2011	Stade de l’Est, Saint-Denis, Réunion	Retained WBF light-welterweight title
21	Win	18–3	Lucia Morelli	TKO	6 (10)	Nov 6, 2010	Complexe sportif Vallier, Marseille, France	Retained WBF light-welterweight title
20	Win	17–3	Ann Saccurato	UD	10	Oct 9, 2009	Salle Vallier, Marseille, France	Won vacant WBF light-welterweight title
19	Loss	16–3	Holly Holm	UD	10	Jan 23, 2009	Isleta Casino & Resort, Albuquerque, New Mexico, U.S.	For WIBA welterweight title
18	Win	16–2	Angel McKenzie	RTD	3 (6)	Jun 27, 2008	Palais des Sports de Toulon, Toulon, France	
17	Win	15–2	Angel McKenzie	TKO	6 (6)	May 3, 2008	Palais des Sports, Marseille, France	
16	Win	14–2	Daniela David	TKO	4 (6)	Dec 8, 2007	La Palestre, Le Cannet, France	
15	Loss	13–2	Anne Sophie Mathis	MD	10	Jun 29, 2007	Palais des Sports, Marseille, France	For WBA light-welterweight title
14	Loss	13–1	Anne Sophie Mathis	TKO	7 (10)	Dec 2, 2006	Palais Omnisport de Paris-Bercy, Paris, France	Lost WBA light-welterweight title; For European light-welterweight title
13	Win	13–0	Belinda Laracuente	UD	10	Jul 15, 2006	La Palestre, Le Cannet, France	Retained WBA light-welterweight title
12	Win	12–0	Belinda Laracuente	UD	10	Mar 18, 2006	Palais des sports Marcel-Cerdan, Levallois-Perret, France	Retained WBA light-welterweight title
11	Win	11–0	Jane Couch	TKO	3 (10)	Dec 5, 2005	Palais Omnisport de Paris-Bercy, Paris, France	Retained WBA light-welterweight title; Won vacant WIBF light-welterweight title
10	Win	10–0	Iva Weston	TKO	3 (10)	Jul 9, 2005	La Palestre, Le Cannet, France	Retained WBA light-welterweight title
9	Win	9–0	Elena Tverdokhleb	TKO	10 (10)	Apr 29, 2005	Palais des Sports, Marseille, France	Retained WBA light-welterweight title
8	Win	8–0	Eliza Olson	UD	10	Nov 8, 2004	Palais Omnisport de Paris-Bercy, Paris, France	Won inaugural WBA light-welterweight title
7	Win	7–0	Elena Tverdokhleb	PTS	8	Jul 10, 2004	La Palestre, Le Cannet, France	
6	Win	6–0	Monica Herzilla	TKO	1 (8)	May 27, 2004	Zenith d'Auvergne, Cournon-d'Auvergne, France	
5	Win	5–0	Larysa Berezenko	PTS	6	Apr 29, 2004	Palais des sports Marcel-Cerdan, Levallois-Perret, France	
4	Win	4–0	Borislava Goranova	PTS	6	Mar 20, 2004	Palais des Sports de Gerland, Lyon, France	
3	Win	3–0	Elena Tverdokhleb	PTS	6	Dec 16, 2003	Palais des sports Marcel-Cerdan, Levallois-Perret, France	
2	Win	2–0	Laura Stefanescu	TKO	1 (6)	Nov 14, 2003	Palais des sports Marcel-Cerdan, Levallois-Perret, France	
1	Win	1–0	Katalin Csehi	TKO	1 (6)	Oct 10, 2003	Palais des Sports, Marseille, France	

== Mixed martial arts record ==
Professional record breakdown
1 match	1 win	0 losses
By decision	1	0

Res.	Record	Opponent	Method	Event	Date	Round	Time	Location	Notes
Win	1–0	Annalisa Bucci	Decision (Unanimous)	PFC 4 - Pancrase Fighting Championship 4	April 14, 2012	2	5:00	Marseille, France	

== See also ==
- List of female boxers
- List of female mixed martial artists

Sporting positions
Minor world boxing titles
Vacant Title last held by Agnieszka Rylik	WIBF light-welterweight champion December 5, 2005 – 2009; Vacated	Vacant Title next held by Anne Sophie Mathis
New title	WBF light-welterweight champion October 9, 2009 – 2011; Vacated	Vacant Title next held by Holly Holm
Major world boxing titles
Inaugural champion	WBA light-welterweight champion November 8, 2004 – December 2, 2006	Succeeded by Anne Sophie Mathis
Inaugural champion	IBF light-welterweight champion November 5, 2011 – 2012; Vacated	Vacant Title next held by Marisa Gabriela Nunez
