= Mary Jo Sanders =

American boxer

Personal information
- Born: January 13, 1974 (age 52) Detroit, Michigan, U.S.
- Height: 5 ft 7 in (170 cm)
- Weight: Light welterweight; Welterweight; Light middleweight; Middleweight

Boxing career
- Stance: Orthodox

Boxing record
- Total fights: 27
- Wins: 25
- Win by KO: 8
- Losses: 1
- Draws: 1

Mary Jo Sanders (born January 13, 1974) is an American retired professional boxer. She is the daughter of NFL Hall of Famer, Charlie Sanders.

== Professional career ==
In March 2007, Sanders defended her IBA middleweight title against Valerie Mahfood, this would end up being the last women's world title fight on English-language television in the U.S for 10 years. In a highly anticipated bout in 2008 with Holly Holm, a fight in which Sanders was favored to win, Holm won via decision. The two had a rematch four months later and fought to a draw. She was inducted into the International Women's Boxing Hall of Fame in 2018.

== Professional boxing record ==
| 27 fights | 25 wins | 1 loss |
|---|---|---|
| By knockout | 8 | 0 |
| By decision | 17 | 1 |
| Draws | 1 | |

| No. | Result | Record | Opponent | Type | Round, time | Date | Location | Notes |
|---|---|---|---|---|---|---|---|---|
| 27 | Draw | 25–1–1 | Holly Holm | MD | 10 | Oct 17, 2008 | The Palace, Auburn Hills, Michigan, U.S. | For vacant IBA female super welterweight title |
| 26 | Loss | 25–1 | Holly Holm | UD | 10 | Jun 13, 2008 | Isleta Casino & Resort, Albuquerque, New Mexico, U.S. | For vacant IBA female super welterweight title |
| 25 | Win | 25–0 | Veronica Rucker | TKO | 4 (8) | Nov 29, 2007 | Andiamo Italia, Warren, Michigan, U.S. | |
| 24 | Win | 24–0 | Valerie Mahfood | UD | 10 | Mar 30, 2007 | Cobo Hall, Detroit, Michigan, U.S. | Retained IBA female middleweight title |
| 23 | Win | 23–0 | Gina Nicholas | RTD | 2 (10) | Jan 12, 2007 | The Palace, Auburn Hills, Michigan, U.S. | Won IBA female middleweight title |
| 22 | Win | 22–0 | Cimberly Harris | UD | 4 | Nov 24, 2006 | Little River Casino and Resort, Manistee, Michigan, U.S. | |
| 21 | Win | 21–0 | Tricia Turton | UD | 10 | Jun 3, 2006 | The Palace, Auburn Hills, Michigan, U.S. | Won vacant WIBA super welterweight title |
| 20 | Win | 20–0 | Iva Weston | TKO | 3 (10) | Feb 3, 2006 | Conference Center, Detroit, Michigan, U.S. | Won vacant WBC female & WIBA welterweight titles |
| 19 | Win | 19–0 | Lisa Holewyne | UD | 10 | Dec 17, 2005 | The Palace, Auburn Hills, Michigan, U.S. | |
| 18 | Win | 18–0 | Yvonne Reis | UD | 6 | Oct 19, 2005 | Andiamo's, Warren, Michigan, U.S. | |
| 17 | Win | 17–0 | Eliza Olson | UD | 10 | Jul 30, 2005 | Cobo Arena, Detroit, Michigan, U.S. | Won WBC World female super lightweight title |
| 16 | Win | 16–0 | Belinda Laracuente | UD | 10 | May 14, 2005 | Coushatta Casino Resort, Kinder, Louisiana, U.S. | |
| 15 | Win | 15–0 | Lois Theobald | TKO | 1 (8) | Apr 29, 2005 | The Palace, Auburn Hills, Michigan, U.S. | |
| 14 | Win | 14–0 | Melissa Del Valle | UD | 6 | Mar 16, 2005 | Andiamo Italian, Warren, Michigan, U.S. | |
| 13 | Win | 13–0 | Rita Turrisi | UD | 8 | Oct 27, 2004 | Andiamo's Banquet Center, Warren, Michigan, U.S. | |
| 12 | Win | 12–0 | Carla Witherspoon | TKO | 3 (6) | Sep 16, 2004 | Kewadin Casino, Sault Sainte Marie, Michigan, U.S. | |
| 11 | Win | 11–0 | Lisa Holewyne | TKO | 9 (10) | Aug 19, 2004 | Aldrich Arena, Maplewood, Minnesota, U.S. | |
| 10 | Win | 10–0 | Terri Blair | UD | 4 | Jul 16, 2004 | Memorial Civic Center, Canton, Ohio, U.S. | |
| 9 | Win | 9–0 | Chevelle Hallback | PTS | 10 | May 20, 2004 | Kewadin Casino, Sault Sainte Marie, Michigan, U.S. | |
| 8 | Win | 8–0 | Layla McCarter | UD | 6 | Apr 16, 2004 | Gund Arena, Cleveland, Ohio, U.S. | |
| 7 | Win | 7–0 | Jamie Whitcomb | TKO | 1 (4) | Jan 30, 2004 | The Palace, Auburn Hills, Michigan, U.S. | |
| 6 | Win | 6–0 | Terri Blair | UD | 4 | Jul 31, 2003 | Kewadin Casino, Sault Sainte Marie, Michigan, U.S. | |
| 5 | Win | 5–0 | Cynthia Prouder | UD | 4 | Jul 15, 2003 | Playboy Mansion, Beverly Hills, California, U.S. | |
| 4 | Win | 4–0 | Shadina Pennybaker | MD | 4 | Jul 1, 2003 | Cafaro Field, Niles, Ohio, U.S. | |
| 3 | Win | 3–0 | Shadina Pennybaker | UD | 4 | Jun 5, 2003 | State Theater, Detroit, Michigan, U.S. | |
| 2 | Win | 2–0 | Terri Blair | UD | 4 | May 23, 2003 | Grays Armory, Cleveland, Ohio, U.S. | |
| 1 | Win | 1–0 | Willicia Moorehead | TKO | 1 (4) | Feb 7, 2003 | The Palace, Auburn Hills, Michigan, U.S. | |

== See also ==
- List of female boxers

Sporting positions
Major world boxing titles
| Inaugural champion | WBC female super lightweight champion July 30, 2005 – 2006; Vacated | Vacant Title next held by Anne Sophie Mathis |
| Inaugural champion | WBC female welterweight champion February 3, 2006 – 2007; Vacated | Vacant Title next held by Holly Holm |
