= Anne Sophie Mathis =

French boxer (born 1977)

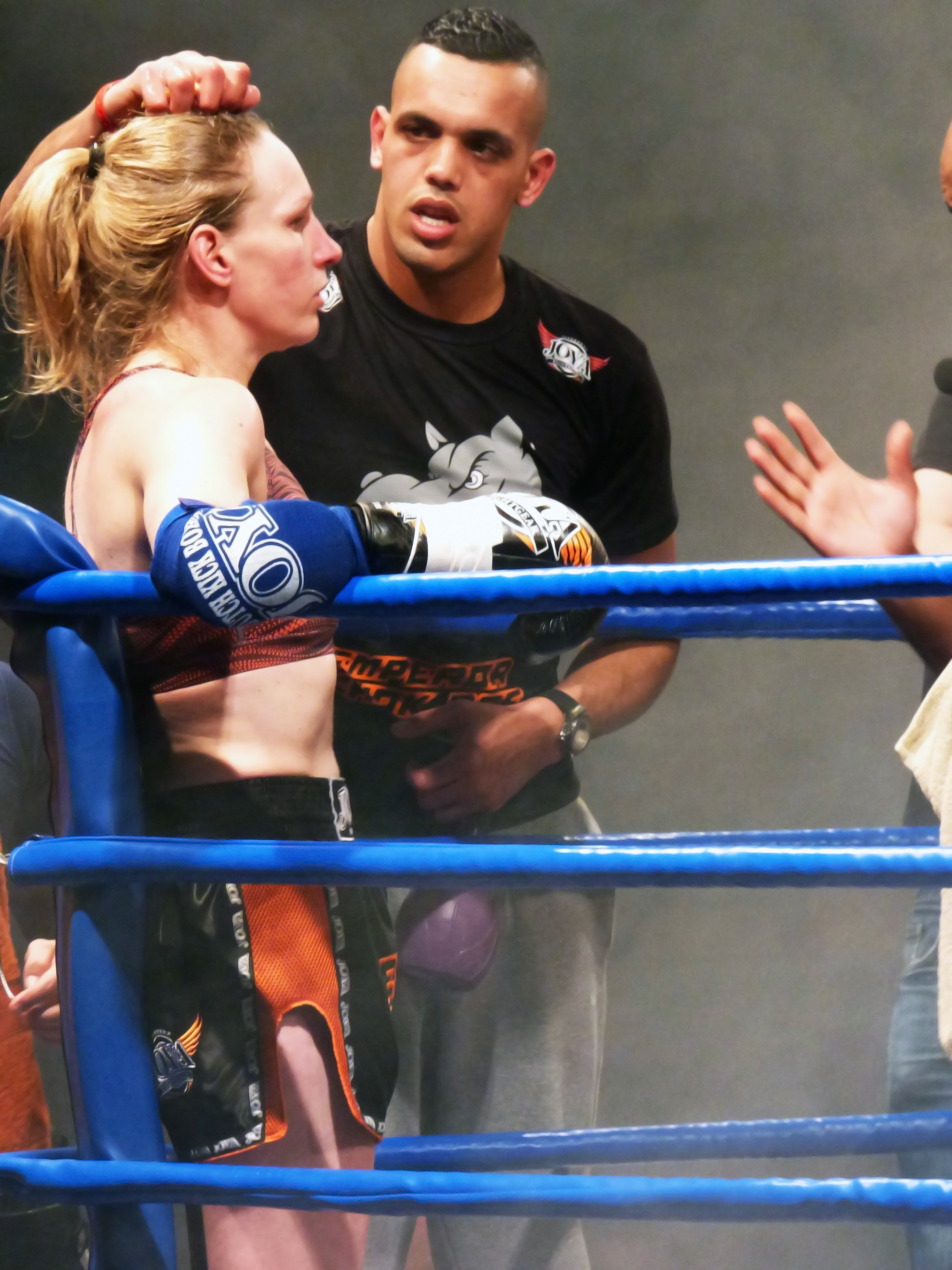
- Anne Sophie Mathis and Zinedine Hameur-Lain in 2016

Personal information
- Born: 23 July 1977 (age 49) Nancy, France
- Height: 5 ft 11 in (180 cm)
- Weight: Light welterweight; Welterweight; Light middleweight

Boxing career
- Stance: Orthodox

Boxing record
- Total fights: 33
- Wins: 27
- Win by KO: 23
- Losses: 4
- Draws: 1
- No contests: 1

Anne Sophie Mathis (born 23 July 1977) is a French former professional boxer who competed between 1995 and 2016. She held world titles in two weight division; the WBA female super-lightweight from 2006 to 2008; the WBC female super-lightweight title in 2008; and the WIBF and WIBA welterweight titles in 2011. She also challenged once for the WBO female light-middleweight title in 2014 and the undisputed welterweight title in 2016 against Cecilia Brækhus. She is best known for her knockout win over Holly Holm in 2011 and is considered one of the biggest punchers in the history of women's boxing.

== Career ==
Beating her compatriot Myriam Lamare on 2 December 2006 at Palais Omnisports de Paris-Bercy, she became the women's WBA super Lightweight Champion. On 29 June 2007, she successfully defended her title in a rematch against.

On 2 December 2011 she beat Holly Holm by seventh-round knockout in Albuquerque. However, she lost her belts in a rematch against Holm in a unanimous decision on 15 June 2012 and failed to capture the WBA, WBC and WBO championship belts against Cecilia Brækhus on 22 September 2012.

Mathis went on to win the vacant WBF Super Welterweight title against Yahaira Hernandez on 1 June 2013 by fifth round stoppage.

On 26 July 2014, she put her newly acquired WBF title on the line and attempted to gain the vacant WBO Super Welterweight title against Christina Hammer. This bout resulted in a controversial disqualification of Mathis which was later overruled to No Contest with many arguing that Mathis was robbed of a KO victory.

On 1 October 2016, Mathis challenged Cecilia Brækhus for the WBC/WBA/IBF/WBO and IBO female welterweight titles in Oslo, Norway, losing by stoppage in the second round.

Mathis was inducted into the International Women's Boxing Hall of Fame in 2021.

== Professional boxing record ==
| 33 fights | 27 wins | 4 losses |
|---|---|---|
| By knockout | 23 | 2 |
| By decision | 4 | 2 |
| Draws | 1 | |
| No contests | 1 | |

| No. | Result | Record | Opponent | Type | Round, time | Date | Location | Notes |
|---|---|---|---|---|---|---|---|---|
| 33 | Loss | 27–4–1 (1) | Cecilia Brækhus | TKO | 2 (10), 1:04 | 1 Oct 2016 | The Spectrum, Oslo, Norway | For WBA, WBC, IBF, WBO, and IBO welterweight titles |
| 32 | Draw | 27–3–1 (1) | Oxandia Castillo | SD | 10 | 27 Feb 2015 | Espace Venise, Sarcelles, France | Retained WBF light-middleweight title |
| 31 | NC | 27–3 (1) | Christina Hammer | NC | 5 (10) | 26 Jul 2014 | Anhalt Arena, Dessau, Germany | Retained WBF light-middleweight title; For vacant WBO female light-middleweight title; Originally DQ win for Hammer after Mathis disqualified for rabbit punches, later ruled no contest due to incorrect referee decision |
| 30 | Win | 27–3 | Yahaira Hernandez | TKO | 5 (10), 1:59 | 1 Jun 2013 | Salle Roger Boileau, Dombasle-sur-Meurthe, France | Won vacant WBF light-middleweight title |
| 29 | Loss | 26–3 | Cecilia Brækhus | UD | 10 | 22 Sep 2012 | Arena Nord, Frederikshavn, Denmark | For WBA, WBC, and WBO welterweight titles |
| 28 | Loss | 26–2 | Holly Holm | UD | 10 | 15 Jun 2012 | Route 66 Casino, Albuquerque, New Mexico, US | Lost IBA, and WBF welterweight titles |
| 27 | Win | 26–1 | Holly Holm | KO | 7 (10), 1:38 | 2 Dec 2011 | Route 66 Casino, Albuquerque, New Mexico, US | Won vacant IBA welterweight title |
| 26 | Win | 25–1 | Cindy Serrano | UD | 10 | 1 Oct 2011 | Salle Mermoz, Yutz, France | Retained WIBA, and WBF welterweight titles; Won vacant WIBF welterweight title |
| 25 | Win | 24–1 | Olivia Boudouma | TKO | 5 (10) | 23 Jun 2011 | Salle Jean Roure, Les Pennes-Mirabeau, France | Won vacant WIBA, and WBF welterweight titles |
| 24 | Win | 23–1 | Duda Yankovich | TKO | 3 (10) | 29 Apr 2011 | Espace Roger Boisrame, Pontault-Combault, France | |
| 23 | Win | 22–1 | Diane Schwachhofer | TKO | 2 (8) | 11 Feb 2011 | Palais des Sports, Saint-Quentin, France | |
| 22 | Win | 21–1 | Angel McKenzie | TKO | 4 (6) | 4 Dec 2010 | Salle Roger Boileau, Dombasle-sur-Meurthe, France | |
| 21 | Win | 20–1 | Mihaela Dragan | TKO | 1 (6) | 26 Nov 2010 | Gymnase du Clos de l'Arche, Noisy-le-Grand, France | |
| 20 | Win | 19–1 | Belinda Laracuente | UD | 10 | 22 Nov 2008 | Les Vielles Forges, Les Mazures, France | Retained WBA light-welterweight title |
| 19 | Win | 18–1 | Ana Pascal | TKO | 3 (10) | 8 Mar 2008 | Palais des sports St Symphorien, Metz, France | Retained WBA light-welterweight title; Won vacant WBC, and WIBF light-welterweight titles |
| 18 | Win | 17–1 | Jane Couch | TKO | 2 (6) | 8 Dec 2007 | La Palestre, Le Cannet, France | |
| 17 | Win | 16–1 | Myriam Lamare | MD | 10 | 29 Jun 2007 | Palais des Sports, Marseille, France | Retained WBA light-welterweight title |
| 16 | Win | 15–1 | Borislava Goranova | KO | 4 (6) | 26 May 2007 | Salle Roger Boileau, Dombasle-sur-Meurthe, France | |
| 15 | Win | 14–1 | Olga Bojare | TKO | 2 (6) | 28 Apr 2007 | Salle de l'Hotel de Ville, Villerupt, France | |
| 14 | Win | 13–1 | Myriam Lamare | TKO | 7 (10) | 2 Dec 2006 | Palais Omnisports Paris Bercy, Paris, France | Retained European light-welterweight title; Won WBA light-welterweight title |
| 13 | Win | 12–1 | Borislava Goranova | TKO | 5 (6) | 14 Oct 2006 | Dombasle-sur-Meurthe, France | |
| 12 | Win | 11–1 | Oksana Cernikova | TKO | 3 (6) | 4 Feb 2006 | Longuyon, France | |
| 11 | Win | 10–1 | Nathalie Toro | TKO | 9 (10) | 29 Oct 2005 | Dombasle-sur-Meurthe, France | Won European light-welterweight title |
| 10 | Win | 9–1 | Larysa Berezenko | TKO | 5 (6) | 19 Mar 2005 | Metz, France | |
| 9 | Win | 8–1 | Borislava Goranova | TKO | 6 (6) | 27 Nov 2004 | Hussigny-Godbrange, France | |
| 8 | Win | 7–1 | Daniela David | TKO | 3 (6) | 24 Sep 2004 | Matoury, French Guiana | |
| 7 | Win | 6–1 | Alexandra Vajdova | TKO | 1 (6) | 11 Jun 2004 | Palais des Sports, Nancy, France | |
| 6 | Win | 5–1 | Daniela David | TKO | 6 (6) | 26 May 2004 | Matoury, French Guiana | |
| 5 | Win | 4–1 | Daniela David | TKO | 6 (6) | 17 Apr 2004 | Dombasle-sur-Meurthe, France | |
| 4 | Win | 3–1 | Larysa Berezenko | PTS | 6 | 27 Feb 2004 | Hyères, France | |
| 3 | Win | 2–1 | Katalin Csehi | TKO | 2 (6) | 6 Dec 2003 | Dombasle-sur-Meurthe, France | |
| 2 | Loss | 1–1 | Marischa Sjauw | TKO | 5 (10) | 18 Nov 1995 | Landgraaf, Netherlands | |
| 1 | Win | 1–0 | Erika Szegedi | TKO | 1 (4) | 21 Oct 1995 | Eger, Hungary | |

== See also ==
- List of female boxers

Sporting positions
Regional boxing titles
| Preceded by Nathalie Toro | European light-welterweight champion 29 October 2005 – 2008; Vacated | Vacant Title next held by Vinni Skovgaard |
Minor world boxing titles
| Vacant Title last held by Myriam Lamare | WIBF light-welterweight champion 8 March 2008 – 2009; Vacated | Vacant Title next held by Klara Svensson |
| Vacant Title last held by Jessica Balogun | WIBA welterweight champion 23 June 2011 – 2006; Vacated | Vacant Title next held by Tori Nelson |
| Vacant Title last held by Noni Tenge | WBF welterweight champion 23 June 2011 – 15 June 2012 | Succeeded by Holly Holm |
| Vacant Title last held by Heidi Hartmann | WIBF welterweight champion 1 October 2011 – 2011; Vacated | Vacant Title next held by Vivian Fontana |
| Vacant Title last held by Holly Holm | IBA welterweight champion 2 December 2011 – 15 June 2012 | Succeeded by Holly Holm |
| New title | WBF light-middleweight champion 1 June 2013 – 2015; Vacated | Vacant Title next held by Noni Tenge |
Major world boxing titles
| Preceded by Myriam Lamare | WBA light-welterweight champion 2 December 2006 – 2010; Vacated | Vacant Title next held by Monica Silvina Acosta |
| Vacant Title last held by Mary Jo Sanders | WBC light-welterweight champion 8 March 2008 – 2009; Vacated | Vacant Title next held by Monica Silvina Acosta |
