= Rola El-Halabi =

German boxer

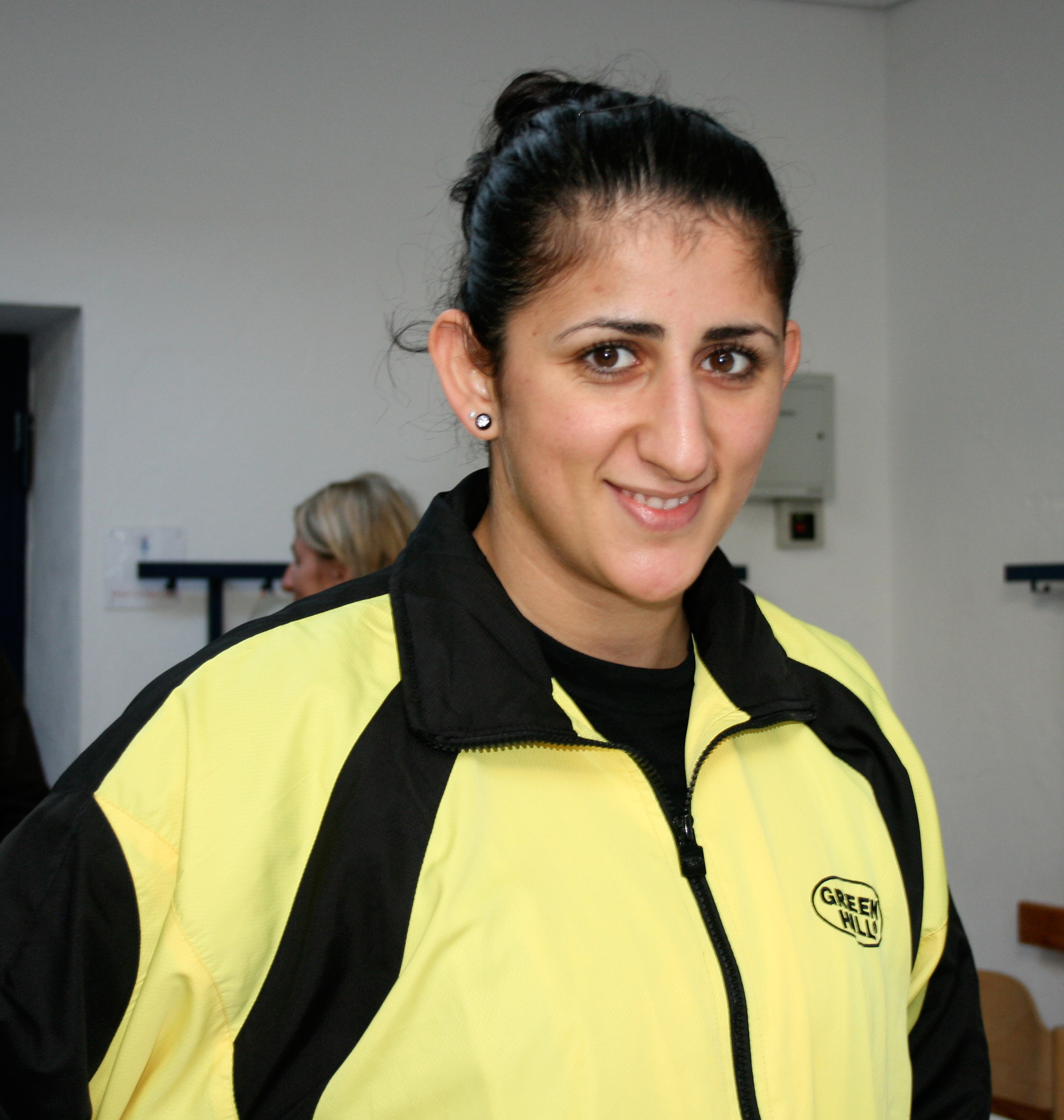

Personal information
- Nationality: (Germany) German
- Born: 17 March 1985 (age 41) Beirut, Lebanon
- Height: 168 cm (5 ft 6 in)
- Weight: Lightweight 135.0 lb (61.2 kg; 9.64 st)

Boxing career
- Stance: Regular

Boxing record
- Total fights: 13
- Wins: 12
- Win by KO: 7
- Losses: 1
- Draws: 0
- No contests: 0

Rola El-Halabi (Arabic: رولا الحلبي; born in Bourjein, Lebanon, on 17 March 1985) is a professional German boxer of Syrian-Lebanese origin and former quadruple world champion in the WIBF, UBF, WBF and WIBA.

She migrated to Germany with her family when she was one. In 1994 she started in kickboxing and Thai kickboxing, and in 1996 in amateur boxing. After becoming champion runner-up in kick-boxing and multiple German champion in the International Amateur Boxing, she turned professional in 2006. On 30 September 2007, Rola Bou Orm became European champion of the Women's International Boxing Federation (WIBF) in the lightweight division. In October 2008, she was honored as outstanding female athlete in Ulm. On 5 June 2009, she won the world title by WIBF and Women's International Boxing Association (WIBA) after defeating Spanish Loly Munoz.

On 1 April 2011 just before a title fight against the Bosnian Irma Adler in Berlin-Karlshorst, her stepfather and former manager Hicham El-Halabi shot her in her hand, knee and both feet, a few months after his management contract was terminated in January 2011. He also injured two security guards before being arrested. The reason of the assault was apparently private, Hicham El-Halabi disapproving of Rola's relationship with a married man of Greek origin.

Following her injuries, she did not fight in a professional match until she was defeated by Lucia Morelli on 12 January 2013. After her defeat she switched to a higher weight class (light welterweight) and in August of the same year she won the WBF title there by defeating Dalia Vasarhelyi. A month later she defended her title successfully against Sopo Putkaradze.

== Amateur record ==
=== Kickboxing and Thai kickboxing ===
She had 20 fights with 17 wins (8 with KO) and 3 defeats. In addition, she was:

- Baden-Wuerttemberg kickboxing champion in 2001
- German Champion Kickboxing 2003
- Nations Cup champion kickboxing 2004
- German Champion Kickboxing 2004
- International German Champion Thai Boxing 2004
- Kickboxing World Cup winner 2004
- Vice European Champion Kickboxing 2004
- Vice World Champion Kickboxing 2005

=== Boxing ===
She had 22 amateur boxing fights, with 18 victories (3 with KO), 4 losses. In 2004, she took part in the European Championship. She was also:

- International Tiroler Champion 2002
- Ceresit-Cup winner in 2002
- Bavarian Champion 2003
- International German Champion 2003
- International German Champion 2004
- South German Champion 2005
- Dolomitencup Winner 2005
- Polencup Winner 2006
- International German Champion 2006

== Professional boxing career ==
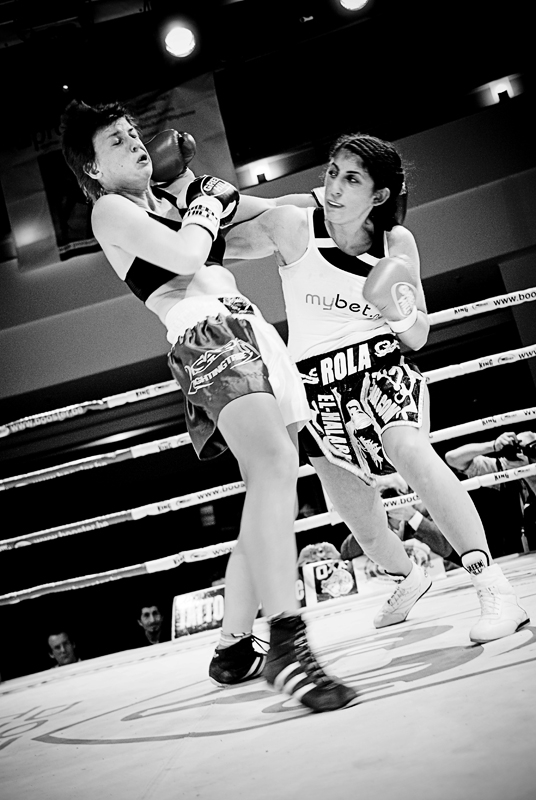
Rola El-Halabi in 2009

Until January 2014, she won 12 out of 13 matches (with 7 KOs):

- Charlotte von Baumgarten (Germany) (technical KO in first round – 10 June 2007)
- Sabrina Stegner (Germany) (KO in first round – 4 August 2007)
- Galina Gumliiska (Bulgaria) (points in 10 rounds – 30 September 2007)
- Borislava Goranova (Bulgaria) (points in 4 rounds – 4 December 2007)
- Elisabejta Suerica (Romania) (KO in first round – 9. February 2008)
- Marina Kohlgruber (Germany) (points in 10 rounds – 26 July 2008)
- Eva Santa (Serbia) (KO in 5th round – 16 November 2008)
- Loly Munoz (Spain) (points in 10 rounds – 5 June 2009)
- Agnese Boza (Latvia) (KO in 4th round – 4 September 2009)
- Mia St. John (USA) (technical KO in 5th round – 20 March 2010)
- Olga Bojare (Latvia) (points in 6 rounds – 4 June 2010)
- Lucia Morelli (ITA) (PTN10 am 12 January 2013)
- Dalia Vasarhelyi (Hun) (UD am 3 August 2013)
- Sopo Putkaradze (GEO) (TKO am 7 September 2013)

== Professional boxing record ==
14 fights	13 wins	1 loss
By knockout	7	0
By decision	6	1

No.	Result	Record	Opponent	Type	Round, time	Date	Location	Notes
15	Win	14-1-0	(United States) Victoria Cisneros	UD		10 May 2014	(Germany)	
14	Win	13-1-0	(Georgia (country)) Sopo Putkaradze	TKO		7 Sep 2013	(Germany)	
13	Win	12-1-0	(Hungary) Dalia Vasarhelyi	UD		3 Aug 2013	(Germany)	
12	Loss	11-1-0	(Italy) Lucia Morelli	MD		12 Jan 2013	(Germany)	
11	Win	11-0-0	(Latvia) Olga Bojare	UD		4 Jun 2010	(Germany)	
10	Win	10-0-0	(United States) Mia St. John	TKO		20 Mar 2010	(Germany)	
9	Win	9-0-0	(Latvia) Agnese Boza	KO		4 Sep 2009	(Germany)	
8	Win	8-0-0	(Spain) Loli Munoz	PTS		5 Jun 2009	(Germany)	
7	Win	7-0-0	(Serbia) Eva Bajic	KO		16 Nov 2008	(Germany)	
6	Win	6-0-0	(Germany) Marina Kohlgruber	UD		26 July 2008	(Germany)	
5	Win	5-0-0	(Romania) Elisabejta Suerica	KO		9 Feb 2008	(Germany)	
4	Win	4-0-0	(Bulgaria) Borislava Goranova	PTS		4 Dec 2007	(Germany)	
3	Win	3-0-0	(Bulgaria) Galina Gumliiska	UD		30 Sep 2007	÷ (Germany)	
2	Win	2-0-0	(Germany) Sabrina Stegner	KO		4 Aug 2007	(Germany)	
1	Win	1-0-0	(Germany) Charlotte von Baumgarten	TKO		10 Jun 2007	(Germany)	
