= Fight Valley =

2016 film

- Directed by: Rob Hawk
- Written by: Rob Hawk
- Starring: Cris Cyborg; Holly Holm; Miesha Tate; Susie Celek
- Production company: Cinestyle Media Group
- Distributed by: Breaking Glass Films
- Release date: July 22, 2016
- Running time: 90 minutes
- Country: United States
- Language: English

Fight Valley is a 2016 action film directed by Rob Hawk. It stars Susie Celek, as well as mixed martial artists Miesha Tate, Holly Holm, and Cris Cyborg.

== Plot ==
Twenty-two year old Tori Coro gets involved in an underground fighting ring in a rough section of Camden, NJ. When her bruised and beaten body is found abandoned in the woods, rumors begin to swirl that Tori died in Fight Valley, an unofficial neighborhood where fighters go to make money. Tori's sister Windsor moves to town to start her own investigation. Jabs, a respected fighter turned gym owner, agrees to train Windsor as she prepares to come face to face with Tori's killer and fight for justice

== Cast ==
- Susie Celek as Windsor Coro
- Miesha Tate as Jabs
- Cris Cyborg as Church
- Cabrina Collesides as Jamie
- Erin O'Brien as Duke
- Kari J. Kramer as Yanni
- Chelsea Durkalec as Tori Coro
- Amanda Serrano as Vivian
- Holly Holm as Payton Walsh
- Katlyn Chookagian as Parking Lot Fighter
- Ivy LaShawn Coleman as Gracey

== Release ==
The film was signed by Philadelphia-based distributor Breaking Glass Pictures and released in July 2016.

== Reception ==
The film gained a mixed reception from critics.
