= Melissa Del Valle =

American boxer

Personal information
- Nickname: Honey Girl
- Nationality: (United States) American
- Born: Melissa Del Valle; June 2, 1969 (age 57) New York City, New York, U.S.
- Height: 1.65 m (5 ft 5 in)
- Weight: Light welterweight

Boxing career
- Stance: Orthodox

Boxing record
- Total fights: 37
- Wins: 29
- Win by KO: 11
- Losses: 6
- Draws: 1

Melissa Del Valle (born June 2, 1969, in New York) is an American multiple champion in women's boxing. She was inducted into the International Women's Boxing Hall of Fame in 2023.

== Biography ==
A member of a sports-minded family of Puerto Rican decent. Del Valle took up boxing in the early 1990s, while her older brother Lou Del Valle was making a name for himself as a light-welterweight boxer.

Then fighting under her married name of Melissa Salamone, she won the New York state Golden Gloves title at 132 pounds in 1996 and 1997. In the latter year, she added the national amateur lightweight title, sweeping all five scorecards in the finals on July 19, 1997.

She then announced she was joining the professional ranks, debuting on September 5, 1997, with a first round knockout of Marsha Evans. She followed that up with several more impressive victories, and one year and one week later, she earned her first title shot. On September 12, 1998, Del Valle won a 10-round unanimous decision over Melinda Robinson to claim the vacant WIBF super featherweight title.

She fought and won six non-title bouts over the next 11 months, then defended her title against fellow unbeaten Lena Akesson on August 14, 1999, in Miami Beach, Florida. Despite suffering a cut over one eye and an early knockdown, she rallied late to win a close but unanimous decision.

Personal problems then kept her out of the ring for nearly a year before she challenged Laura Serrano on August 5, 2000, in Connecticut for the IBA version of the super featherweight title. After 10 rounds, the fight was ruled a draw, but most spectators believed Serrano had won. Del Valle, in an act of candor that won her a great deal of respect, also admitted she thought Serrano beat her.

The controversial Serrano fight did not slow down Del Valle, however, and she won seven straight fights to earn, yet another title shot, on June 21, 2002, against Ada Vélez for the WIBA super bantamweight title. This was the featured event on an all-women's card featuring several of the sport's top boxers. Del Valle rose to the occasion, taking Velez' title by winning seven of the 10 rounds on two cards and nine of 10 on the other.

Over a three-month period in 2003, Del Valle challenged four of the top fighters in women's boxing, suffering her first three losses in the process. On July 10, she fell to 27-1-1 by losing a close decision over six rounds to Kelsey Jeffries. On August 9, she faced junior lightweight world champion Isra Girgrah, taking the fight on short notice. Girgrah was given the decision, but most observers thought Del Valle won, and Girgrah promised her a rematch in the future.

Three weeks later, Del Valle moved back down to the super featherweight ranks once again and challenged Chevelle Hallback for her IBA title in Savannah, Georgia. Hallback defeated her over 10 rounds, handing Del Valle her third straight loss. But she got back on the winning track on October 11, when she handed undefeated Kelli Cofer her first loss in a six-round fight in Greensboro, North Carolina. The win over Cofer improved her career record to 28 wins, three losses, and one draw, with 11 knockouts.

Del Valle is also noteworthy as the answer to a handful of boxing trivia questions. She and her brother are the only brother and sister to both win world boxing titles; Lou Del Valle was WBA light-heavyweight champion from 1997 to 1998. She was also the first women's boxer to fight on the same card as her (then) husband, Craig Salamone. The two appeared together on a card in Atlanta, Georgia, on November 21, 1997.

She is known by the nickname Honey Girl, in deference to her brother, who calls himself Honey Boy because of a reputation for being able to slip punches from opponents.

== Professional boxing record ==
37 fights	29 wins	6 losses
By knockout	11	0
By decision	18	6
Draws	1	
No contests	1	

No.	Result	Record	Opponent	Type	Round, time	Date	Location	Notes
38	Loss		Belinda Laracuente	UD		2007-06-15	Orleans Hotel & Casino, Las Vegas, Nevada, US	Global Boxing Union Female World super lightweight title
37	NC		Chevelle Hallback			2005-10-07	A La Carte Event Pavilion, Tampa, Florida, US	
36	Loss		Mary Jo Sanders	UD		2005-03-16	Andiamo Italian, Warren, Michigan, US	
35	Win		Trisha Hill	UD		2004-05-30	DC Tunnel, Washington, District of Columbia, US	
34	Loss		Jenifer Alcorn	SD		2003-12-11	Palace Indian Gaming Center, Lemoore, California, US	vacant Women's International Boxing Association World lightweight title
33	Win		Kelli Cofer	MD		2003-10-11	Coliseum, Greensboro, North Carolina, US	
32	Loss		Chevelle Hallback	UD		2003-08-30	Civic Center, Savannah, Georgia, US	International Boxing Association female super featherweight title
31	Loss		Isra Girgrah	UD		2003-08-09	Convention Center, Washington, District of Columbia, US	
30	Loss		Kelsey Jeffries	UD		2003-07-10	HP Pavilion, San Jose, California, US	
29	Win		Brenda Drexel	UD		2003-01-31	Harriet Himmel Theatre, West Palm Beach, Florida, US	
28	Win		Ada Velez	UD		2002-06-21	Convention Center, Waco, Texas, US	Women's International Boxing Association World super bantamweight title
27	Win		Carla Witherspoon	TKO		2001-09-29	Martinsville, Virginia, US	
26	Win		Sophia Johnson	UD		2001-07-26	Charleston, South Carolina, US	
25	Win		Kelley Jones	TKO		2001-05-24	The Plex, Charleston, South Carolina, US	
24	Win		Jovette Jackson	UD		2001-05-12		
23	Win		Sophia Johnson	TKO		2001-04-28	Nashville, Tennessee, US	
22	Win		Carla Witherspoon	TKO		2001-04-12	Gaillard Municipal Auditorium, Charleston, South Carolina, US	
21	Win		Layla McCarter	UD		2001-01-17	Yonkers Raceway, Yonkers, New York, US	
20	Draw		Laura Serrano	PTS		2000-08-12	Miccosukee Indian Gaming Resort, Miami, Florida, US	Women's International Boxing Association World super featherweight title
19	Win		Lena Åkesson	UD		1999-08-14	Loews Hotel, Miami Beach, Florida, US	Women's International Boxing Federation World super featherweight title
18	Win		Olivia Gerula	UD		1999-06-12	Shriner's Auditorium, Wilmington, Massachusetts, US	
17	Win		Cora Webber	UD		Feb 20, 1999	Madison Square Garden, New York, New York, US	
16	Win		Carla Witherspoon	UD		1999-01-22	Milander Auditorium, Hialeah, Florida, US	
15	Win		Tawayna Broxton	TKO		1998-12-18	Memorial Auditorium, Fort Lauderdale, Florida, US	
14	Win		Carla Witherspoon	UD		1998-11-13	Miccosukee Indian Gaming Resort, Miami, Florida, US	
13	Win		Melinda Robinson	UD		1998-09-12	Miccosukee Indian Gaming Resort, Miami, Florida, US	
12	Win		Tawayna Broxton	TKO		1998-08-11	Miccosukee Indian Gaming Resort, Miami, Florida, US	
11	Win		Lakeya Williams	TKO		1998-06-27	North River Gym, Miami, Florida, US	
10	Win		Jacklyn Rogers	TKO		1998-05-02	Miccosukee Indian Gaming Resort, Miami, Florida, US	
9	Win		Monica Taylor			1998-04-18	Miccosukee Indian Gaming Resort, Miami, Florida, US	
8	Win		Denette Montgomery	KO		1998-04-04	Miccosukee Indian Gaming Resort, Miami, Florida, US	
7	Win		Gwen Smith			1998-01-31	Ice Palace, Tampa, Florida, US	
6	Win		Tequile Haskins	TKO		1997-12-20	Club Grand Slam, Miami, Florida, US	
5	Win		Taquella Hoskin	TKO		1997-12-04	The Moon, Tallahassee, Florida, US	
4	Win		Rolanda Andrews			1997-11-21	Yonkers Raceway, Yonkers, New York, US	
3	Win		Tawayna Broxton	UD		1997-10-02		
2	Win		Tawayna Broxton	UD		1997-09-20	Round 1 Gym, Boca Raton, Florida, US	
1	Win		Marsha Evans	TKO		1997-09-05	Davidson Theatre, Pembroke Pines, Florida, US	
