= Holly Holm =

American boxer, kickboxer, and mixed martial arts fighter (born 1981)

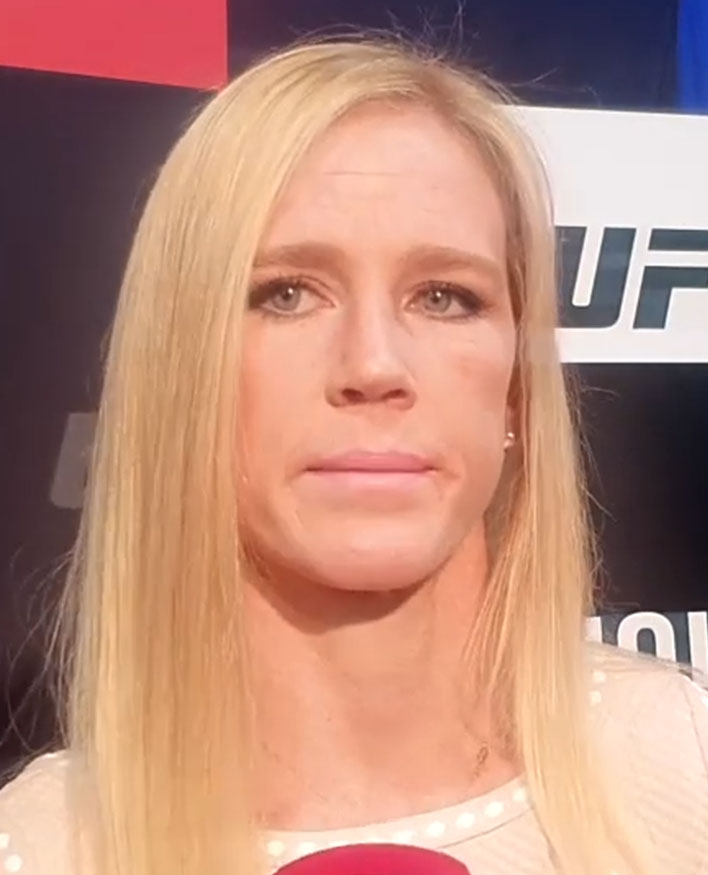
- Holm at UFC 246
- Born: Holly Rene Holm; October 17, 1981 (age 45); Albuquerque, New Mexico, U.S.
- Other names: The Preacher's Daughter
- Height: 5 ft 8 in (173 cm)
- Weight: 135 lb (61 kg; 9 st 9 lb)
- Division: Bantamweight (MMA); Featherweight (MMA); Light Welterweight (Boxing); Welterweight (Boxing and Kickboxing); Light Middleweight (Boxing)
- Reach: 70 in (178 cm)
- Style: Boxing
- Fighting out of: Albuquerque, New Mexico, U.S.
- Team: Jackson Wink MMA Academy (2007–present); AKKA Karate USA (2000–2007)
- Trainer: Mike Winkeljohn (Boxing, Kickboxing); Greg Jackson (MMA); Izzy Martinez (Wrestling); Rafael "Barata" Freitas (BJJ)
- Rank: Blue belt in Brazilian Jiu-Jitsu under Roberto "Tussa" Alencar
- Years active: 2011–2024 (MMA); 2002–2013; 2025–present (Boxing); 2001–2003 (Kickboxing)

Professional boxing record
- Total: 41
- Wins: 34
- By knockout: 9
- Losses: 4
- By knockout: 2
- Draws: 3

Kickboxing record
- Total: 22
- Wins: 14
- Losses: 1
- By knockout: 1
- Draws: 7

Mixed martial arts record
- Total: 23
- Wins: 15
- By knockout: 8
- By decision: 7
- Losses: 7
- By knockout: 1
- By submission: 2
- By decision: 4
- No contests: 1

Other information
- University: University of New Mexico
- Spouse: Jeff Kirkpatrick (m. 2012; div. 2019)
- Notable school: Manzano High School
- Website: hollyholm.com
- Boxing record from BoxRec
- Mixed martial arts record from Sherdog

Holly Rene Holm (born October 17, 1981) is an American professional boxer and mixed martial artist. She previously competed in the women's Bantamweight division of the Ultimate Fighting Championship (UFC), where she is a former Women's Bantamweight Champion.

In boxing, Holm has been a multiple-time world champion, defending her titles 18 times in three weight classes, and a two-time Ring magazine fighter of the year (2005, 2006). She is ranked by BoxRec as the 5th greatest female professional boxer of all time, pound for pound.

Holm's most notable win in mixed martial arts (MMA) occurred at UFC 193 on November 15, 2015, in Melbourne, when she captured the bantamweight title and gave Ronda Rousey her first loss in the sport. According to ESPN, this fight is generally considered to be one of the biggest upsets in combat-sports history. She is the first fighter to have won a major world title in both professional boxing and mixed martial arts and Fight Matrix currently ranks her as the 17th greatest female fighter of all time, pound for pound.

== Early life ==
Holm was born in Albuquerque, New Mexico, the youngest of three children. Her father, Roger, is a Church of Christ preacher of Swedish and Native American ancestry—as a fighter, Holly would later be nicknamed "The Preacher's Daughter"—and her mother, Tammy, is a massage therapist of Irish and French descent.

Growing up, Holm played soccer and participated in gymnastics, swimming and diving. Her parents divorced shortly before she graduated from Manzano High School in 2000; after graduation, she studied for a year at the University of New Mexico.

== Amateur kickboxing career ==
Holm's path to a career in boxing and kickboxing began with aerobics classes when she was 16 years old. Her cardio-kickboxing instructor, Mike Winkeljohn, recognized Holm's potential as a fighter and began training her.

In September 2001, Holm won the championship title in the International Rules Adult Women's Welterweight Division at the International Kickboxing Federation (IKF) USA National Amateur Championship Tournament, held in Kansas City, Missouri. She fought two bouts in the tournament. She won the first by technical knockout at 34 seconds in the first round. She won the second by unanimous decision. This was Holm's last amateur competition. Her overall amateur kickboxing record is 6–0–2.

== Professional boxing career ==
Holm has held several welterweight boxing titles, been highly regarded as one of the best female welterweights in the world, and is considered among the best of all time by some. She also has been named Ring Magazine female Fighter of the Year, twice in consecutive years in 2005 and 2006. She has drawn large audiences in her hometown of Albuquerque, having all but three of her fights there and just one of her fights outside of her home state of New Mexico.

In June 2008 she became the undisputed welterweight champion and holder of belts from 140 to 154 by defeating former champ Mary Jo Sanders by decision. They had a rematch on October 17, 2008, at the Palace of Auburn Hills in suburban Detroit, which ended in a draw.

On December 2, 2011, Holm took on knockout artist Anne Sophie Mathis of France for the vacant IBA female and WBAN welterweight titles. Holm was badly beaten by the stronger Mathis without the referee interfering, even going into the canvas without a count. She finally lost by knockout in the 7th round, which would be dubbed the upset of the year in women's boxing. The two fought again on June 15, 2012, for Mathis's WBF female, IBA female, and WBAN welterweight titles. Holm took a unanimous decision to win over Mathis, becoming the new champion and avenging her earlier KO loss.

=== Return to boxing ===
Holm signed with Jake Paul's Most Valuable Promotions in May 2025. She made her boxing return in a 10-round lightweight bout against previously undefeated Yolanda Ochoa on June 28, 2025, in Anaheim, California. Holm won the fight by unanimous decision with all three ringside judges awarding her every round.

==== Holm vs. Han ====
She challenged WBA female lightweight champion Stephanie Han at Coliseo Roberto Clemente in San Juan, Puerto Rico, on January 3, 2026. Holm lost by unanimous technical decision having been behind on all three ringside judges' scorecards when the fight was stopped in the seventh round due to a cut on her hairline caused by an accidental clash of heads.

==== Holm vs. Han 2 ====
Holm challenged Stephanie Han for her WBA lightweight title in a rematch at County Coliseum in El Paso, Texas, on May 30, 2026. She lost via majority decision decision with two of the ringside judges scoring the fight 96–94 in her opponent's favour, while the third had it a 95–95 draw.

== Mixed martial arts career ==
=== Early career ===
Holm made her mixed martial arts debut on March 4, 2011, against Christina Domke at an event organized by her boxing promoter, Lenny Fresquez. She headlined the card with Jackson's Submission Fighting teammate Keith Jardine. Holm won the fight via TKO in the second round after her opponent was unable to continue due to leg kicks inflicted by Holm.

Holm returned to MMA on September 9, 2011, at Fresquez Productions: Clash in the Cage against Strikeforce veteran Jan Finney. She defeated Finney by TKO in the third round.

=== Bellator MMA ===
On February 28, 2013, Holm made her Bellator MMA debut against Katie Merrill at Bellator 91 in Rio Rancho, New Mexico. Holm won the bout via TKO in the second round.

Holm announced that she would retire from boxing after her May 11, 2013, boxing match against Mary McGee so that she can fully concentrate on her MMA career. The message came as a punctuation in the negotiations to arrange a title-battle between Holm and the Norwegian champion Cecilia Brækhus. Holm went on to defeat McGee via unanimous decision, for her boxing retirement bout.

=== Legacy Fighting Championship ===
On July 19, 2013, Holm faced Allanna Jones at Legacy Fighting Championship 21. She won the fight by head-kick knockout in the second round.

Holm was expected to face Erica Paes at Legacy Fighting Championship 24 on October 11, 2013. However, Paes was removed from the card and Holm instead faced Nikki Knudsen. Holm won the fight via TKO due to a body kick and knees in round two.

On December 6, 2013, Holm faced Angela Hayes at Fresquez Productions: Havoc. She won the fight via unanimous decision.

On April 4, 2014, Holm faced Juliana Werner for the inaugural Legacy FC Women's Bantamweight Championship. She won the bout and title via TKO in the fifth round due to a head kick and punches. Holm broke her left arm during the first round of the bout.

=== Ultimate Fighting Championship ===
On July 10, 2014, the media announced that Holm had signed a multi-fight deal with the Ultimate Fighting Championship (UFC). Later in an interview with MMA Junkie, Holm's manager Lenny Fresquez disclosed that Holm's contract is for five fights.

Holm was expected to make her debut at UFC 181 against Raquel Pennington. However, on November 13, Holm was forced to pull out due to an undisclosed injury. The two fighters faced each other at UFC 184. Holm won the bout by split decision (29–28, 28–29, and 30–27).

Holm faced Marion Reneau on July 15, 2015, at UFC Fight Night 71. Holm won the fight by unanimous decision (30–27, 30–26, and 29–28).

==== Holm vs. Rousey ====
In her highest-profile MMA fight to date, Holm was initially scheduled to face defending women's bantamweight champion Ronda Rousey at UFC 195 on January 2, 2016. However, following a bout shuffle due to Robbie Lawler's injury, they faced before a record-setting crowd in the main event of UFC 193 on November 14, 2015. Despite being a massive betting underdog, Holm controlled a majority of the bout with her striking and defended all of Rousey's takedowns. The second fighter to take Rousey past the first round (after Miesha Tate), she won the fight via knockout in the second with a high kick, ending Rousey's undefeated streak and three-year reign as champion, causing her to spend the night in the hospital.

Holm was also awarded her first "Fight of the Night" and "Performance of the Night" bonus awards (totalling $100,000). By winning the title, she became the first person to win championships in both boxing and MMA. Following the bout, UFC fighter Jon Jones said he thought Holm was "already the G.O.A.T. (greatest of all time) of women's combat sports". Her hometown, Albuquerque, New Mexico, proclaimed November "Holly Holm Month".

In her first title defense, Holm lost to Miesha Tate in the fifth round on March 5, 2016, at UFC 196. After four rounds of back-and-forth fighting, Tate defeated Holm in the fifth with a rear-naked choke. Holm was strong in the first round of the fight standing up but was less effective grappling with Tate on the mat. After Tate took Holm down in the second round, Holm almost submitted to a guillotine choke but wriggled out just before the bell. In the fifth round, Tate scored another takedown and locked in another rear-naked choke. Holm refused to submit, was rendered unconscious, and the referee declared a technical submission.

Holm faced Valentina Shevchenko on July 23, 2016, at UFC on Fox 20. She lost the bout via unanimous decision.

==== Women's featherweight championship ====
Holm faced Germaine de Randamie at UFC 208 for the inaugural UFC Women's Featherweight Championship on February 11, 2017. She lost the fight via unanimous decision. At the end of the second and third rounds, de Randamie continued to throw punches after the horn had sounded and the referee stepped in, the first of which was a right hand that visibly wobbled Holm, who had already stopped fighting. The referee did not take a point on either occasion. 14 out of 23 media outlets and a majority of MMA fans still scored the fight in favor of Holm. Holm said post-fight that she believed both instances were intentional. She appealed to the New York State Athletic Commission (NYSAC) to review the referee's decisions and determine an "appropriate result". On February 28, the NYSAC denied the appeal, finding "no clear error or violation of statute or rule."

==== Post championship ====
Holm returned to bantamweight division after losing the featherweight title bout. Holm faced Bethe Correia at UFC Fight Night: Holm vs. Correia on June 17, 2017, in Singapore. She won the fight via knockout in the third round via a head kick that dropped Correia and then a punch. The win earned Holm her second Performance of the Night bonus award. This also set up her bout against UFC Women's Featherweight Champion Cris Cyborg at UFC 219.

In a return to the women's featherweight division, Holm challenged Cris Cyborg for the UFC Featherweight Championship on December 30, 2017, in the main event at UFC 219. She lost the fight via unanimous decision. This fight earned Holm her second Fight of the Night bonus.

Holm faced Megan Anderson on June 9, 2018, at UFC 225. She won the fight via unanimous decision.

Holm was expected to face Aspen Ladd in a bantamweight bout on March 2, 2019, at UFC 235. However, on January 31, 2019, it was reported the pairing was no longer taking place at the event.

On March 20, it was reported that Holm signed a new six-fight contract with the UFC.

Holm faced Amanda Nunes for the Women's bantamweight championship on July 6, 2019, at UFC 239. She lost the fight via technical knockout in round one after being dropped by a head kick and finished with follow-up punches by Nunes.

Holm was scheduled to face Raquel Pennington on October 6, 2019, at UFC 243. However, on September 27, it was revealed that Holm withdrew from the bout due to a hamstring injury and the bout was cancelled. The pair was rescheduled to fight on January 18, 2020, at UFC 246. She won the fight via unanimous decision.

Holm was scheduled to face Irene Aldana on August 1, 2020, at UFC Fight Night: Brunson vs. Shahbazyan, but Aldana withdrew after testing positive for COVID-19. Holm was removed from the card as well and the pairing was rescheduled for October 4, 2020 at UFC on ESPN: Holm vs. Aldana. Holm won the fight by a unanimous decision.

Holm was scheduled to face Julianna Peña on May 8, 2021, at UFC on ESPN 24. However, Holm was forced to withdraw from the bout, citing hydronephrosis.

Holm was scheduled to face Norma Dumont in a featherweight bout on October 16, 2021, at UFC Fight Night 195. However, Holm withdrew from the bout due to a knee injury, and she was replaced by Aspen Ladd.

Holm faced Ketlen Vieira on May 21, 2022, at UFC Fight Night 206. She lost the fight via controversial split decision. 18 out of 20 media outlets scored the bout as a win for Holm.

Having one bout left on her prevailing contract, Holm signed a new six-fight contract with the UFC in late 2022.

Holm faced Yana Santos on March 25, 2023, at UFC on ESPN 43. She won the fight via unanimous decision.

Holm faced Mayra Bueno Silva on July 15, 2023, at UFC on ESPN 49 as a replacement for an injured Miesha Tate whom Bueno Silva was originally scheduled to face at UFC on ESPN 46. She lost the fight via ninja choke in the second round. In mid-October 2023, the bout was overturned to a No Contest after Bueno Silva was suspended by the Nevada State Athletic Commission for a positive pre-fight test.

Holm faced Kayla Harrison on April 13, 2024, at UFC 300. She lost the fight due to a rear-naked choke submission in the second round.

On January 13, 2025, Holm was released by the UFC at her request.

=== Global Fight League ===
Holm was scheduled to face former Bellator Women's Featherweight World Champion Julia Budd in the inaugural Global Fight League event on May 24, 2025 at GFL 1. However, all GFL events were cancelled indefinitely.

== Freestyle wrestling career ==
Holm received an exemption from Most Valuable Promotions to compete at RAF 01 on August 30, 2025, where she lost by decision to Alejandra Rivera.

== Fighting style ==
Holm employs frequent lateral movement while working stiff jabs to an opponent's head. When standing within the pocket, she often waits to attack with counter-strikes, usually employing a straight left hand. Holm is also known for her punching combinations, typically done while her opponents are against the cage.

Decorated boxer and ONE Championship fighter Ana Julaton has described Holm as a "natural mover", noting her footwork as an asset in setting up strikes. At UFC 193, Ronda Rousey took several blows while struggling to close the distance against Holm. Holm uses a variety of kicking techniques, often targeting the body with a fast side kick, pushing back a rush with a low oblique kick, and attacking the head with a left high kick.

== In popular culture ==
Holm is one of several boxers photographed by artist Delilah Montoya and profiled in the publication Women Boxers: The New Warriors. She appeared in the 2016 feature film Fight Valley alongside Miesha Tate and Cris Cyborg.

== Championships and accomplishments ==
=== Boxing ===
- Overall
  - 16 title defenses won at three different weight classes
- World Boxing Federation
  - WBF Female World Light Welterweight Championship (One time)
  - WBF Female World Welterweight Championship (One time)
  - 2012 Female Fighter of the Year
  - 2012 Female Fight of the Year vs. Anne Sophie Mathis on June 15
- Women Boxing Archive Network
  - WBAN World Welterweight Championship (One time)
  - WBAN World Junior Welterweight Championship (One time)
  - WBAN World Junior Middleweight Championship (One time; First)
  - 2012 Biggest Comeback of the Year
  - 2011 Fight of the Year vs. Anne Sophie Mathis on December 2
  - 2010 Fighter of the Year
  - 2009 Most Accomplished of the Year
  - 2008 Highest Achievements of the Year
  - 2007 Fighter of the Year
  - 2007 Most Improved Boxer of the Year
  - 2006 Most Improved Boxer of the Year
  - 2005 Hottest Rising Star of the Year
  - 2005 Upset of the Year vs. Christy Martin on September 16
- World Boxing Council
  - WBC Female World Welterweight Championship (One time)
  - NABF Female Light Welterweight Championship (One time)
- Global Boxing Union
  - Global Boxing Union (GBU) World Welterweight Championship (One time)
- Women's International Boxing Association
  - WIBA World Light Welterweight Championship (One time)
  - WIBA World Welterweight Championship (One time)
- International Female Boxers Association
  - IFBA World Welterweight Championship (One time)
  - IFBA World Light Middleweight Championship (One time)
  - 2006 Fighter of the Year
- World Boxing Association
  - WBA Female World Welterweight Championship (One time; First)
- International Boxing Association
  - IBA Female World Welterweight Championship (Three times)
  - IBA Female World Light Welterweight Championship (Three times; First)
- BadLeftHook.com
  - 2012 Female Comeback Fighter of the Year
- BoxRec
  - Highest ranked female boxer in automated all-time pound-for-pound rankings at the time of her retirement from boxing. By the time of winning her UFC championship she dropped to #2 in pound-for-pound rankings but still was #1 in welterweight
- The Ring
  - 2006 Female Fighter of the Year
  - 2005 Female Fighter of the Year
- New Mexico Boxing
  - 2013 Hall of Fame Inductee
  - 2010 Fighter of the Year
  - 2009 Fighter of the Year
  - 2008 Fighter of the Year
  - 2007 Fighter of the Year
  - 2006 Fighter of the Year
  - 2005 Fighter of the Year
- Albuquerque Sports Hall of Fame
  - 2005 Female Athlete of the Year
- International Women's Boxing Hall of Fame
  - 2017 Hall of Fame inductee
- New Mexico Sports Hall of Fame
  - 2019 Hall of Fame inductee
- International Boxing Hall of Fame
  - 2022 Hall of Fame inductee

=== Kickboxing ===
- International Kickboxing Federation
  - IKF/Ringside 2001 USA National Amateur International Rules Welterweight Championship
  - IKF/Ringside 2001 Central Mountain Regional Amateur International Rules Welterweight Tournament Winner

=== Mixed martial arts ===
- Ultimate Fighting Championship
  - UFC Women's Bantamweight Championship (One time; former)
  - Fight of the Night (Two times) vs. Ronda Rousey and Cris Cyborg
  - Performance of the Night (Two times) vs. Ronda Rousey and Bethe Correia
  - Third most total fight time in UFC Women's Bantamweight division history (3:12:13)
  - Tied (Sara McMann & Marion Reneau) for fifth most bouts in UFC Women's Bantamweight division history (13)
  - Second longest average fight time in UFC Women's Bantamweight division history (15:27)
  - UFC.com Awards
    - 2015: Newcomer of the Year, Upset of the Year & Knockout of the Year vs. Ronda Rousey & Ranked #4 Fighter of the Year
    - 2017: Ranked #7 Knockout of the Year vs. Bethe Correia
- Legacy Fighting Championships
  - Legacy FC Women's Bantamweight Championship (One time; first)
- ESPN
  - 2015 Knockout of the Year vs. Ronda Rousey on November 15
- Sherdog
  - 2015 Upset of the Year vs. Ronda Rousey on November 15
  - 2015 Breakthrough Fighter of the Year
  - 2015 All-Violence Third Team
- MMA Fighting
  - 2015 Knockout of the Year vs. Ronda Rousey on November 15
- MMA Junkie
  - 2015 Upset of the Year vs. Ronda Rousey
  - 2015 Knockout of the Year vs. Ronda Rousey
  - 2015 November Knockout of the Month vs. Ronda Rousey
- Bleacher Report
  - 2015 Breakout Star of the Year
  - 2015 Biggest Moment: Holly Holm Knocks out Ronda Rousey on November 15
  - 2015 Knockout of the Year vs. Ronda Rousey on November 15
  - 2013 WMMA Knockout of the Year vs. Allanna Jones on July 19
- Inside MMA
  - 2015 Female Fighter of the Year Bazzie Award
  - 2015 Knockout of the Year Bazzie Award vs. Ronda Rousey on November 15
  - 2013 Rising Star of the Year Bazzie Award
- World MMA Awards
  - 2015 Female Fighter of the Year
  - 2015 Breakthrough Fighter of the Year
  - 2015 Knockout of the Year vs. Ronda Rousey at UFC 193
  - 2015 Upset of the Year vs. Ronda Rousey at UFC 193
- ESPY Awards
  - 2016 Upset of the Year vs. Ronda Rousey on November 15, 2015
- CBS Sports
  - 2016 #3 Ranked UFC Fight of the Year vs. Miesha Tate
- Combat Press
  - 2015 Female Fighter of the Year
  - 2015 Breakout Fighter of the Year
  - 2015 Knockout of the Year vs. Ronda Rousey at UFC 193
  - 2015 Upset of the Year vs. Ronda Rousey at UFC 193
- MMA Weekly
  - 2015 Knockout of the Year vs. Ronda Rousey at UFC 193
  - 2015 Upset of the Year vs. Ronda Rousey at UFC 193

== Mixed martial arts record ==
Professional record breakdown
23 matches	15 wins	7 losses
By knockout	8	1
By submission	0	2
By decision	7	4
No contests	1	

Res.	Record	Opponent	Method	Event	Date	Round	Time	Location	Notes
Loss	15–7 (1)	Kayla Harrison	Submission (rear-naked choke)	UFC 300	April 13, 2024	2	1:47	Las Vegas, Nevada, United States	
NC	15–6 (1)	Mayra Bueno Silva	NC (overturned)	UFC on ESPN: Holm vs. Bueno Silva	July 15, 2023	2	0:38	Las Vegas, Nevada, United States	Originally a submission (ninja choke) win for Bueno Silva; overturned after she tested positive for ritalinic acid.
Win	15–6	Yana Santos	Decision (unanimous)	UFC on ESPN: Vera vs. Sandhagen	March 25, 2023	3	5:00	San Antonio, Texas, United States	
Loss	14–6	Ketlen Vieira	Decision (split)	UFC Fight Night: Holm vs. Vieira	May 21, 2022	5	5:00	Las Vegas, Nevada, United States	
Win	14–5	Irene Aldana	Decision (unanimous)	UFC on ESPN: Holm vs. Aldana	October 4, 2020	5	5:00	Abu Dhabi, United Arab Emirates	
Win	13–5	Raquel Pennington	Decision (unanimous)	UFC 246	January 18, 2020	3	5:00	Las Vegas, Nevada, United States	
Loss	12–5	Amanda Nunes	TKO (head kick and punches)	UFC 239	July 6, 2019	1	4:10	Las Vegas, Nevada, United States	Return to Bantamweight. For the UFC Women's Bantamweight Championship.
Win	12–4	Megan Anderson	Decision (unanimous)	UFC 225	June 9, 2018	3	5:00	Chicago, Illinois, United States	
Loss	11–4	Cris Cyborg	Decision (unanimous)	UFC 219	December 30, 2017	5	5:00	Las Vegas, Nevada, United States	For the UFC Women's Featherweight Championship. Fight of the Night.
Win	11–3	Bethe Correia	KO (head kick and punch)	UFC Fight Night: Holm vs. Correia	June 17, 2017	3	1:09	Kallang, Singapore	Bantamweight bout. Performance of the Night.
Loss	10–3	Germaine de Randamie	Decision (unanimous)	UFC 208	February 11, 2017	5	5:00	Brooklyn, New York, United States	Featherweight debut. For the inaugural UFC Women's Featherweight Championship.
Loss	10–2	Valentina Shevchenko	Decision (unanimous)	UFC on Fox: Holm vs. Shevchenko	July 23, 2016	5	5:00	Chicago, Illinois, United States	
Loss	10–1	Miesha Tate	Technical Submission (rear-naked choke)	UFC 196	March 5, 2016	5	3:30	Las Vegas, Nevada, United States	Lost the UFC Women's Bantamweight Championship.
Win	10–0	Ronda Rousey	KO (head kick and punches)	UFC 193	November 15, 2015	2	0:59	Melbourne, Australia	Won the UFC Women's Bantamweight Championship. Performance of the Night. Fight of the Night. Knockout of the Year.
Win	9–0	Marion Reneau	Decision (unanimous)	UFC Fight Night: Mir vs. Duffee	July 15, 2015	3	5:00	San Diego, California, United States	
Win	8–0	Raquel Pennington	Decision (split)	UFC 184	February 28, 2015	3	5:00	Los Angeles, California, United States	
Win	7–0	Juliana Werner	TKO (head kick and punches)	Legacy FC 30: Holm vs. Werner	April 4, 2014	5	1:50	Albuquerque, New Mexico, United States	Won the inaugural Legacy FC Women's Bantamweight Championship.
Win	6–0	Angela Hayes	Decision (unanimous)	Fresquez Productions: Havoc	December 6, 2013	3	5:00	Albuquerque, New Mexico, United States	
Win	5–0	Nikki Knudsen	TKO (kick to the body and knees)	Legacy FC 24: Feist vs. Ferreira	October 11, 2013	2	1:18	Dallas, Texas, United States	
Win	4–0	Allanna Jones	KO (head kick)	Legacy FC 21: Huerta vs. Hobar	July 19, 2013	2	2:22	Houston, Texas, United States	
Win	3–0	Katie Merrill	TKO (punches)	Bellator 91	February 28, 2013	2	3:02	Rio Rancho, New Mexico, United States	
Win	2–0	Jan Finney	KO (kick to the body)	Fresquez Productions: Clash in the Cage	September 9, 2011	3	2:49	Albuquerque, New Mexico, United States	
Win	1–0	Christina Domke	TKO (leg kicks)	Fresquez Productions: Double Threat	March 4, 2011	2	3:58	Albuquerque, New Mexico, United States	

== Professional boxing record ==
41 fights	34 wins	4 losses
By knockout	9	2
By decision	25	2
Draws	3	

No.	Result	Record	Opponent	Type	Round, time	Date	Location	Notes
41	Loss	34–4–3	Stephanie Han	MD	10	May 30, 2026	El Paso County Coliseum, El Paso, Texas, U.S.	For WBA female lightweight title
40	Loss	34–3–3	Stephanie Han	TD	7 (10), 1:44	Jan 3, 2026	Coliseo Roberto Clemente, San Juan, Puerto Rico	For WBA female lightweight title
39	Win	34–2–3	Yolanda Vega	UD	10	Jun 28, 2025	Honda Center, Anaheim, California, U.S.	
38	Win	33–2–3	Mary McGee	UD	10	May 11, 2013	Route 66 Casino, Albuquerque, New Mexico, U.S.	Retained IBA female, and WBF female light welterweight titles
37	Win	32–2–3	Diana Prazak	UD	10	Dec 7, 2012	Route 66 Casino, Albuquerque, New Mexico, U.S.	Won vacant IBA female, and WBF female light welterweight titles
36	Win	31–2–3	Anne Sophie Mathis	UD	10	Jun 15, 2012	Route 66 Casino, Albuquerque, New Mexico, U.S.	Won IBA female, WBF female, and WBAN welterweight titles
35	Loss	30–2–3	Anne Sophie Mathis	KO	7 (10), 1:38	Dec 2, 2011	Route 66 Casino, Albuquerque, New Mexico, U.S.	For vacant IBA female and WBAN welterweight titles
34	Win	30–1–3	Victoria Cisneros	UD	10	Jun 10, 2011	Route 66 Casino, Albuquerque, New Mexico, U.S.	
33	Win	29–1–3	Ann Saccurato	TKO	8 (10), 0:51	Dec 3, 2010	Route 66 Casino, Albuquerque, New Mexico, U.S.	Retained IBA female light welterweight title; Won WBAN light welterweight title
32	Win	28–1–3	Jaime Clampitt	TKO	1 (10), 1:53	Aug 6, 2010	Hard Rock, Albuquerque, New Mexico, U.S.	Won vacant IBA female light welterweight title
31	Win	27–1–3	Chevelle Hallback	UD	10	Mar 26, 2010	Isleta Casino & Resort, Albuquerque, New Mexico, U.S.	Won vacant WIBA light welterweight title
30	Win	26–1–3	Victoria Cisneros	UD	10	Dec 4, 2009	Isleta Casino & Resort, Albuquerque, New Mexico, U.S.	Won vacant WBC-NABF female light middleweight title
29	Win	25–1–3	Terri Blair	UD	10	Aug 28, 2009	New Mexico Highlands University, Las Vegas, New Mexico, U.S.	Retained WIBA welterweight title
28	Win	24–1–3	Duda Yankovich	TKO	4 (10), 0:32	Jun 5, 2009	Isleta Casino & Resort, Albuquerque, New Mexico, U.S.	Retained WIBA welterweight title
27	Win	23–1–3	Myriam Lamare	UD	10	Jan 23, 2009	Isleta Casino & Resort, Albuquerque, New Mexico, U.S.	Retained WIBA welterweight title
26	Draw	22–1–3	Mary Jo Sanders	MD	10	Oct 17, 2008	The Palace, Auburn Hills, Michigan, U.S.	For vacant IBA female light middleweight title
25	Win	22–1–2	Mary Jo Sanders	UD	10	Jun 13, 2008	Isleta Casino & Resort, Albuquerque, New Mexico, U.S.	Retained IFBA light middleweight title; Won inaugural WBAN light middleweight title
24	Win	21–1–2	Belinda Laracuente	UD	10	Feb 7, 2008	Pechanga Resort & Casino, Temecula, California, U.S.	Retained IFBA welterweight title
23	Win	20–1–2	Miriam Brakache	TKO	7 (10), 1:40	Jan 11, 2008	Isleta Casino & Resort, Albuquerque, New Mexico, U.S.	Retained WBC female, and IFBA welterweight titles
22	Win	19–1–2	Angelica Martinez	UD	10	Sep 21, 2007	Santa Ana Star Casino, Bernalillo, New Mexico, U.S.	Won vacant IBA female welterweight title
21	Win	18–1–2	Chevelle Hallback	UD	10	May 23, 2007	Tingley Coliseum, Albuquerque, New Mexico, U.S.	
20	Win	17–1–2	Ann Saccurato	UD	10	Mar 22, 2007	Isleta Casino & Resort, Albuquerque, New Mexico, U.S.	Retained WBA female welterweight title; Won vacant WBC female, IBA female, GBU female, WIBA, and IFBA welterweight titles
19	Win	16–1–2	Tricia Turton	UD	10	Dec 1, 2006	Isleta Casino & Resort, Albuquerque, New Mexico, U.S.	Won vacant IFBA light middleweight title
18	Win	15–1–2	Jane Couch	UD	10	Sep 23, 2006	Isleta Casino & Resort, Albuquerque, New Mexico, U.S.	Retained IBA female light welterweight title
17	Win	14–1–2	Angelica Martinez	UD	10	Jun 10, 2006	Isleta Casino & Resort, Albuquerque, New Mexico, U.S.	Won inaugural WBA female welterweight title
16	Win	13–1–2	Shadina Pennybaker	TKO	7 (10), 0:57	Feb 24, 2006	Isleta Casino & Resort, Albuquerque, New Mexico, U.S.	Retained IBA female light welterweight title
15	Win	12–1–2	Mia St. John	UD	10	Dec 8, 2005	Isleta Casino & Resort, Albuquerque, New Mexico, U.S.	Retained IBA female light welterweight title
14	Win	11–1–2	Christy Martin	UD	10	Sep 16, 2005	Isleta Casino & Resort, Albuquerque, New Mexico, U.S.	
13	Win	10–1–2	Lisa Lewis	TKO	8 (10), 3:00	Jun 24, 2005	Isleta Casino & Resort, Albuquerque, New Mexico, U.S.	Retained IBA female light welterweight title
12	Win	9–1–2	Gloria Ramirez	UD	4	Apr 15, 2005	Tingley Coliseum, Albuquerque, New Mexico, U.S.	
11	Win	8–1–2	Terri Blair	UD	10	Dec 10, 2004	Isleta Casino & Resort, Albuquerque, New Mexico, U.S.	Won inaugural IBA female light welterweight title
10	Loss	7–1–2	Rita Turrisi	TKO	4 (6)	Jun 27, 2004	Sandia Casino, Albuquerque, New Mexico, U.S.	
9	Draw	7–0–2	Angelica Martinez	MD	6	May 15, 2004	Sky Ute Casino, Ignacio, Colorado, U.S.	
8	Win	7–0–1	Janae Archuleta	TKO	1 (6)	Apr 10, 2004	Convention Center, Albuquerque, New Mexico, U.S.	
7	Win	6–0–1	Angelica Martinez	UD	6	Dec 12, 2003	Kiva Auditorium, Albuquerque, New Mexico, U.S.	
6	Draw	5–0–1	Stephanie Jaramillo	PTS	6	Oct 3, 2003	Sandia Casino, Albuquerque, New Mexico, U.S.	
5	Win	5–0	Stephanie Jaramillo	MD	4	Aug 26, 2003	Sandia Casino, Albuquerque, New Mexico, U.S.	
4	Win	4–0	Bonnie Mann	UD	4	Sep 6, 2002	Santa Ana Star Casino, Albuquerque, New Mexico, U.S.	
3	Win	3–0	Martha Deitchman	UD	4	Aug 17, 2002	Santa Ana Star Casino, Albuquerque, New Mexico, U.S.	
2	Win	2–0	Terrie Carrillo	TKO	1 (4), 2:36	Jun 21, 2002	Sky City Casino, Acoma, New Mexico, U.S.	
1	Win	1–0	Martha Deitchman	TKO	3 (4)	Jan 25, 2002	Isleta Casino & Resort, Albuquerque, New Mexico, U.S.	

== Kickboxing record ==
Kickboxing Record
2 Wins (2 knockouts, 0 decisions), 1 Loss (1 knockout, 0 decisions), 0 Draws
Date	Result	Opponent	Event	Location	Method	Round	Time	Record
August 9, 2003	Win	Alisa Cantwell	Ring of Fire 9: Eruption	Baraboo, Wisconsin	TKO	1	1:30	2–1
April 6, 2003	Loss	Trisha Hill	GKD Productions & Ring of Fire: Triple Threat Fight Night	Albuquerque, New Mexico	KO	4	N/A	1–1
June 1, 2002	Win	Valerie Anthonson	World Championship Kickboxing: Bad to the Bone	Bernalillo, New Mexico	TKO	2	N/A	1–0
Legend: Win Loss Draw/No contest Notes

== Freestyle record ==
Senior Freestyle Matches
Res.	Record	Opponent	Score	Date	Event	Location
Loss	0-1	(Mexico) Alejandra Rivera	7-9	August 30, 2025	RAF 01	(United States) Cleveland, Ohio

== Pay-per-view bouts ==
=== MMA ===
No.	Event	Fight	Date	City	Venue	PPV Buys
1.	UFC 193	Rousey vs. Holm	November 14, 2015	Melbourne, Victoria, Australia	Docklands Stadium	1,100,000
2.	UFC 208	Holm vs. de Randamie	February 11, 2017	Brooklyn, New York, United States	Barclays Center	200,000
3.	UFC 219	Cyborg vs. Holm	December 30, 2017	Paradise, Nevada, United States	T-Mobile Arena	380,000

== Filmography ==
=== Television ===
Year	Title	Role	Notes
2010	Knockout Sportsworld	Herself	Episode: "Throwing Bombs"; Archive footage

=== Film ===
Year	Title	Role	Notes
2016	Fight Valley	Payton Walsh	

== Personal life ==
Holm has close relationships with her parents and brothers. Her father always attends her fights, and for years assisted in her corner during her boxing matches. She and her father are partners in a real estate company and sold Jon Jones his home. Holm is a Christian and her faith background is in Churches of Christ. Her mother, Tammy Bredy, has seen little of Holm in the cage and rarely attends Holm's bouts.

In 2012, she married Jeff Kirkpatrick, also from Albuquerque, whom she met in college. The couple separated in July 2019; Holm filed for a divorce and sought to get her maiden name back.

== See also ==
- List of female boxers
- List of female mixed martial artists
- List of mixed martial artists with professional boxing records
- List of multi-sport athletes
- List of multi-sport champions
- List of prizefighters with professional boxing and kickboxing records
- List of WBA female world champions
- List of WBC female world champions

Sporting positions
Preceded by Ronda Rousey	2nd UFC Women's Bantamweight Champion; November 15, 2015 – March 5, 2016	Succeeded by Miesha Tate
Major world boxing titles
Inaugural champion	WBA female welterweight champion June 10, 2006 – 2007; Vacated	Vacant Title next held by Cecilia Brækhus
Vacant Title last held by Mary Jo Sanders	WBC female welterweight champion March 22, 2007 – 2008; Vacated	Vacant Title next held by Cecilia Brækhus
Inaugural champion	Undisputed female welterweight champion March 22, 2007 – 2007; Titles fragmented	Vacant Title next held by Cecilia Brækhus
Awards
Preceded by Jaime Clampitt	The Ring magazine Female Fighter of the Year; 2005, 2006	Unknown
Preceded by Mary Kom	WBAN Fighter of the Year; 2007	Succeeded by Katie Taylor
Preceded by Ronda Rousey	World MMA Female Fighter of the Year; 2015	Succeeded by Amanda Nunes
Preceded by Kelvin Gastelum	World MMA Breakthrough Fighter of the Year; 2015	Succeeded by Cody Garbrandt
Preceded by Mark Hunt	World MMA Knockout of the Year; 2015 vs. Ronda Rousey at UFC 193	Succeeded by Michael Page
Preceded by T.J. Dillashaw	World MMA Upset of the Year; 2015 vs. Ronda Rousey at UFC 193	Succeeded by Michael Bisping
Preceded by Ole Miss over Alabama	Best Upset ESPY Award; 2016 vs. Ronda Rousey at UFC 193	Succeeded by Mississippi State defeats Connecticut
