= Emiko Raika =

Japanese boxer and mixed martial artist

- Born: January 24, 1975 (age 51); Kyoto, Japan
- Other names: Raika
- Nationality: Japanese
- Height: 5 ft 4 in (163 cm)
- Weight: 115 lb (52 kg; 8 st 3 lb)
- Division: Lightweight (boxing); Flyweight (MMA)
- Reach: 68.0 in (173 cm)
- Style: Boxing
- Stance: Orthodox
- Years active: 2000–2013 (Boxing); 2014–present (MMA)

Professional boxing record
- Total: 34
- Wins: 25
- By knockout: 10
- Losses: 8
- By knockout: 0
- Draws: 1

Mixed martial arts record
- Total: 26
- Wins: 13
- By knockout: 2
- By submission: 2
- By decision: 9
- Losses: 11
- By knockout: 1
- By submission: 3
- By decision: 7
- Draws: 1
- No contests: 1

Other information
- Boxing record from BoxRec
- Mixed martial arts record from Sherdog

Emiko Raika (来家 恵美子, born January 24, 1975, in Kyoto, Japan) is a Japanese female professional boxer and mixed martial artist.

Although more Japanese women have taken up traditionally male sports such as karate, kickboxing and wrestling in recent years, many in Japan still believe that women should not box, because of the injury risk. Raika, who has suffered a broken nose and an eye socket fracture in fights, shrugs off the possibility of injuries. "When I told friends that I want to become a boxer, they were surprised and put down my decision because I am a woman," said Raika. "But I had to resist. I like boxing and I wanted to do it. In fact, I am expressing myself through boxing. I am fighting not to beat the opponent, but for myself."

== Biography ==
=== Early life ===
Raika lived with her grandmother until she was three. After her grandmother died, she spent the next 15 years in the Karyo-en children's home in Kyoto. Raika was a good student, among the top of her high school graduating class. She studied at Ogaki Women's College and became a licensed dental hygienist, later working at a dental clinic. She quit the job after a month, because she did not like the uniform. She tried other jobs, but they did not make her happy.

"I felt as if I were not living and felt myself destroying." said Raika, "I was very weak mentally. I could choose to have an ordinary life, but I wanted more than just that - to become strong."

=== Boxing career ===
Always enjoying rough sports such as wrestling and rugby, Raika joined a local boxing gym that she found while commuting to work at a battery manufacture, and trained to compete as an amateur boxer.

Raika had three wins in three amateur fights, and was named the most outstanding woman in a local amateur tournament, where she was spotted by Toshihiro Yamaki, a Tokyo gym owner.

With a growing number of Japanese women becoming interested in boxing, a group of gym owners had organized a women's boxing association in 1999, with Yamaki as its secretary general, called the Japanese Women's Boxing Commission (JWBC).

Yamaki was impressed by Raika, and asked her to join his gym and turn professional. She now devotes full-time to boxing.

Raika won the WIBA Featherweight World title from Australian Sharon Anyos in 2001, and successfully defended the title in a 2002 rematch. After destroying an overmatched Shelby Walker in two rounds for her second title defence on May 23, 2004, Raika made her 3rd title defence against the rugged (and undefeated) brawler Melissa Fiorentino on September 18, 2004, in Kyoto, Japan. It was called the WIBA 2004 Fight of the Year, Raika again successfully defended her crown via 10-round decision in a brutal toe-to-toe slugfest.

Raika then vacated her world title at featherweight (126 pounds) to move up in weight to the super featherweight division (130 pounds).

On March 13, 2005, in Tokyo, Japan, Raika lost a 10-round decision to Chevelle Hallback for the vacant WIBA Super Featherweight World Title.

On October 1, 2005, in Tokyo, Japan, Raika won an 8-round decision over Belinda Laracuente.

On May 20, 2006, in Cholla Province, Korea, Raika moved up another 2 weight classes, to 140 pounds, where she won a 10-round unanimous decision over Won Mi Chung, for the IFBA Light Welterweight World Title.

On June 10, 2006, in Tokyo, Japan, Raika knocked out Yoko Takahashi in the 4th round with a body shot.

On December 15, 2006, in Tokyo, Japan, Raika won a 10-round unanimous decision over Terri Blair to win the vacant WIBA Lightweight World Title.

== Mixed martial arts record ==
Professional record breakdown
26 matches	13 wins	11 losses
By knockout	2	1
By submission	2	3
By decision	9	7
Draws	1	
No contests	1	

Res.	Record	Opponent	Method	Event	Date	Round	Time	Location	Notes
Loss	13–11–1 (1)	Shizuka Sugiyama	Decision (unanimous)	Pancrase 341	March 31, 2024	3	5:00	Tokyo, Japan	
Loss	13–10–1 (1)	Honoka Shigeta	Decision (unanimous)	Pancrase 338	November 12, 2023	3	5:00	Tokyo, Japan	
Win	13–9–1 (1)	Kei Nagisa	TKO (punches)	Pancrase 336	July 9, 2023	1	0:25	Tokyo, Japan	
Win	12–9–1 (1)	Fumika Watanabe	Decision (split)	Pancrase 331	March 26, 2023	3	5:00	Tokyo, Japan	
Loss	11–9–1 (1)	So Yul Kim	Technical Submission (rear-naked choke)	Shooto 2022 Vol.7	November 27, 2022	3	2:18	Tokyo, Japan	
Draw	11–8–1 (1)	Megumi Sugimoto	Draw (majority)	Shooto 2022 Vol.6	September 19, 2022	2	5:00	Tokyo, Japan	
Loss	11–8 (1)	Nori	Decision (unanimous)	Pancrase 321	May 30, 2021	3	5:00	Tokyo, Japan	
Loss	11–7 (1)	Takayo Hashi	Decision (unanimous)	Pancrase 316	July 24, 2020	3	5:00	Tokyo, Japan	
Win	11–6 (1)	Anne Karoline Nascimento	Decision (split)	Pancrase 309	October 20, 2019	3	5:00	Tokyo, Japan	
Win	10–6 (1)	Gleicielen Faria	Submission (rear naked choke)	Pancrase 307	July 21, 2019	1	0:45	Tokyo, Japan	
Loss	9–6 (1)	Mayra Cantuária	Submission (armbar)	Pancrase 304	April 14, 2019	1	3:17	Tokyo, Japan	
Win	9–5 (1)	Edna Oliveira	Decision (split)	Pancrase 302	December 9, 2018	3	5:00	Tokyo, Japan	
Loss	8–5 (1)	Kseniya Guseva	Decision (split)	Pancrase 297	July 1, 2018	3	5:00	Tokyo, Japan	
Win	8–4 (1)	Seul Gi Jeon	Decision (unanimous)	GRANDSLAM 7: Way of the Cage	March 25, 2018	2	5:00	Tokyo, Japan	
Win	7–4 (1)	Ji Yeon Seo	Submission (rear naked choke)	TTF Challenge 07	October 9, 2017	2	2:37	Tokyo, Japan	
Win	6–4 (1)	Hae In Kim	Decision (split)	Road FC 040	July 15, 2017	2	5:00	Seoul, South Korea	
Win	5–4 (1)	Jin Hee Kang	Decision (unanimous)	Road FC 037 XX	March 11, 2017	3	5:00	Seoul, South Korea	
Win	4–4 (1)	Satsuki Kodama	Decision (unanimous)	Deep Jewels 15	February 25, 2017	2	5:00	Tokyo, Japan	
Win	3–4 (1)	Jin Hee Kang	Decision (unanimous)	Deep Jewels 14	November 2, 2016	2	5:00	Tokyo, Japan	
Loss	2–4 (1)	Rin Nakai	TKO (elbows)	Pancrase 279	July 24, 2016	3	2:43	Tokyo, Japan	
Loss	2–3 (1)	Brogan Walker	Decision (unanimous)	PXC 50	December 4, 2015	3	5:00	Mangilao, Guam	
NC	2–2 (1)	Jessica-Rose Clark	No Contest	TTF Challenge 05	September 23, 2015	3	5:00	Tokyo, Japan	Result overturned due to Clark missing weight.
Win	2–2	Slavka Vitaly	Decision (split)	Pancrase - 268	July 5, 2015	3	3:00	Tokyo, Japan	
Win	1–2	Sayako Fujita	KO (punch)	Real FC 2 - Zone & Real 2	October 16, 2015	2	2:06	Yokohama, Japan	
Loss	0–2	Shizuka Sugiyama	Technical Submission (armbar)	Deep - Dream Impact 2014: Omisoka Special	December 31, 2014	1	4:06	Saitama, Japan	
Loss	0–1	Su Jeong Lim	Decision (unanimous)	Revolution 2 - Start of the Revolution	September 12, 2014	2	5:00	Seoul, South Korea	

== Professional boxing record ==
43 fights	35 wins	8 losses
By knockout	10	0
By decision	25	8

No.	Result	Record	Opponent	Type	Round	Time	Date	Location	Notes
34	Loss	25–8–1	(South Korea) Choi Hyunmi	UD	10	2:00	Aug 15, 2013	(South Korea) Wolmido, Icheon	For WBA interim female super featherweight title
33	Win	25–7–1	(United States) Cristina Sanchez	UD	8	2:00	Mar 12, 2013	(Japan) Korakuen Hall	
32	Win	24–7–1	(Thailand) Bas Sor Tammajak	KO	2	1:10	Oct 28, 2012	(Japan) Furukawa Sogo Gym, Osaki, Miyagi	
31	Win	23–7–1	(United States) Cynthia Munoz	UD	6	2:00	Jul 11, 2012	(Japan) Korakuen Hall, Tokyo	
30	Loss	22–7–1	(Canada) Jelena Mrdjenovich	UD	10	2:00	Sep 22, 2011	(Japan) Korakuen Hall, Tokyo	
29	Win	22–6–1	(Japan) Chika Mizutani	KO	4	1:54	Apr 4, 2011	(Japan) Korakuen Hall, Tokyo	
28	Win	21–6–1	(United States) Bronwyn Wylie	UD	10	2:00	Sep 24, 2010	(Japan) Korakuen Hall, Tokyo	Won vacant OPBF female lightweight title
27	Win	20–6–1	(Thailand) Lamduan Superchamps	KO	3	2:09	Apr 1, 2010	(Japan) Korakuen Hall, Tokyo	
26	Win	19–6–1	(Thailand) Pantip Muangubon	KO	4	1:48	Dec 6, 2009	ATC Hall, Osaka, Osaka, Japan	
25	Loss	18–6–1	(United States) Layla McCarter	UD	10	2:00	Jul 3, 2009	(United States) South Point Hotel Casino, Las Vegas, Nevada	For WBA and GBU female lightweight titles
24	Loss	18–5–1	(Canada) Olivia Gerula	SD	8	2:00	Mar 3, 2009	(Japan) Korakuen Hall, Tokyo	
23	Loss	18–4–1	(United States) Ann Saccurato	UD	10	2:00	Aug 11, 2008	(Japan) Korakuen Hall, Tokyo	For vacant WBC female lightweight title
22	Win	18–3–1	(United States) Natalie Brown	MD	6	2:00	May 9, 2008	(Japan) Korakuen Hall, Tokyo,	
21	Win	17–3–1	(United States) Ann Saccurato	MD	10	2:00	Nov 10, 2007	(Japan) Shinjuku FACE, Tokyo	Retained WIBA lightweight title
20	Loss	16–3–1	(Canada) Jelena Mrdjenovich	UD	10	2:00	Apr 7, 2007	(Canada) Shaw Conference Centre, Edmonton, Alberta	For WBC female super featherweight title
19	Win	16–2–1	(United States) Terri Blair	UD	10	2:00	Dec 15, 2006	(Japan) Tokyo	Won vacant WIBA lightweight title
18	Win	15–2–1	(Japan) Yoko Takahashi	KO	4	1:30	Jun 10, 2006	(Japan) Shinjuku FACE	
17	Win	14–2–1	(South Korea) Won-Mi Jung	UD	10	2:00	May 20, 2006	Jeongeup, South Korea	Won vacant IFBA super lightweight title
16	Win	13–2–1	(Puerto Rico) Belinda Laracuente	PTS	8	2:00	Oct 1, 2005	(Japan) Roppongi Velfarre, Tokyo	
15	Loss	12–2–1	(United States) Chevelle Hallback	UD	10	2:00	Mar 13, 2005	(Japan) Velfarre, Roppongi, Tokyo	Lost WIBA featherweight title
14	Win	12–1–1	(United States) Melissa Fiorentino	UD	10	2:00	Sep 18, 2004	(Japan) Kyoto	Retained WIBA featherweight title
13	Win	11–1–1	(United States) Shelby Walker	TKO	2	1:59	May 23, 2004	(Japan) Kyoto	Retained WIBA featherweight title
12	Win	10–1–1	(Australia) Sharon Anyos	UD	10	2:00	Nov 30, 2003	(Japan) Tokyo	Retained WIBA featherweight title
11	Win	9–1–1	(United States) Jeri Sitzes	MD	8	2:00	Jun 25, 2003	(Japan) Tokyo	
10	Win	8–1–1	(Australia) Sharon Anyos	SD	10	2:00	Dec 18, 2002	(Japan) Tokyo	Won WIBA featherweight title
9	Win	7–1–1	(United States) Lauren Bennett	TKO	2	0:27	Sep 7, 2002	(Japan) Tokyo	
8	Win	6–1–1	(Japan) Mika Harikae	TKO	3		Jun 9, 2002	(Japan) Tokyo	
7	Loss	5–1–1	(United States) Layla McCarter	MD	8	2:00	Apr 29, 2002	(Japan) Shimokita Town Hall, Tokyo	
6	Win	5–0–1	(Japan) Miki Kikukawa	UD	10	2:00	Feb 3, 2002	(Japan) Shimokita Town Hall, Tokyo	
5	Win	4–0–1	(Japan) Mika Harikae	TKO	3	1:15	Jul 20, 2001	(Japan) Shimokita Town Hall, Tokyo	
4	Win	3–0–1	(Japan) Miki Kikukawa	SD	6	2:00	Mar 2, 2001	(Japan) Shimokita Town Hall, Tokyo	
3	Win	2–0–1	(Japan) Ann Jihe	MD	6	2:00	Dec 12, 2000	(Japan) Shimokita Town Hall, Tokyo	
2	Draw	1–0–1	(Japan) Kaori Koizumi	MD	6	2:00	Sep 21, 2000	(Japan) Shimokita Town Hall, Tokyo	
1	Win	1–0	(Japan) Keiko Onuma	TKO	3	1:17	May 8, 2000	(Japan) Shimokita Town Hall, Tokyo	
