= Belinda Laracuente =

Puerto Rican boxer (born 1980)

Personal information
- Nationality: Puerto Rican
- Born: January 29, 1979 (age 47) Bridgeport, Connecticut, U.S.
- Weight: Super-bantamweight

Boxing career

Boxing record
- Total fights: 58
- Wins: 26
- Win by KO: 9
- Losses: 28
- Draws: 3
- No contests: 1

Belinda Laracuente (born 1980) is a women's boxing competitor from Mayagüez, Puerto Rico, where she lived from 1989 to 1998. Her nickname is Brown Sugar.

Laracuente debuted as a professional boxer on 12 February 1997 in a match against Karen Nye, which Laracuente won.

On 10 October 1999 she reached a draw in four rounds with Jeanne Martinez. After winning her next fight, she went to Bay St. Louis, Mississippi, where she was arrested the night before the fight for underage gambling. She spent a night in jail, and then lost a decision in ten rounds to Denise Moraetes.

In her next competition, Laracuente beat future world champion Daniela Somers by a unanimous decision in Miami. After Somers went on to win the world title by beating Leah Melinger, Laracuente asked for a rematch, but she was denied by Somers' management.

After winning three more matches, she faced Zulfia Koutdoussova, who she ultimately lost to on a split decision.

Facing world champion Christy Martin at the Félix Trinidad-David Reid Pay Per View undercard, Laracuente lost a decision in eight rounds, in a bout that HBO Boxing commentator Jim Lampley said that he thought Laracuente should have won by 78 to 74 on his unofficial score.

After losing one more fight, she retired, but in December 2002 she announced plans to return into the ring, with hopes of getting a new world title chance.

On 14 May 2005, she returned, losing a decision to Mary Jo Sanders, in Kinder, Louisiana. She later lost also to Layla McCarter.

On 8 July 2005, she fought Missy Fiorentino on short notice, losing a unanimous decision to the undefeated prospect.

In 2007 Esther Phiri defeated Belinda to become a world champion.

In 2008 she appeared as a defendant on The People's Court. She was sued by a one-time cornerman who claimed Laracuente never paid him for his services. The cornerman had sued for $2500 of her $7000 purse, plus an additional $2500 for embarrassment and threats, but was awarded only $350 by judge Marilyn Milian.

Laracuente ended her boxing career on 22 June 2012, with a career record of 26-28-3 (9 KO's).

She also appeared in an episode of Made when a teenager was being made into a boxer.

Laracuente was inducted into the International Women's Boxing Hall of Fame in 2018.

== Professional boxing record ==
58 fights	26 wins	28 losses
By knockout	9	1
By decision	17	27
Draws	3	
No contests	1	

No.	Result	Record	Opponent	Type	Round, time	Date	Location	Notes
58	Loss	26–3–28	(Argentina) Monica Silvina Acosta	TKO		Aug 9, 2013	Club Estudiantes, Santa Rosa, La Pampa, Argentina	WBA World female super lightweight title
57	Win	26–3–27	(Canada) Jelena Mrdjenovich	UD	8	Jun 29, 2012	Shaw Conference Centre, Edmonton, Alberta, Canada	
56	Win	26–3–26	(United States) Nicole Woods	UD		Mar 27, 2012	(United States) Grand Ballroom, Atlanta, Georgia, USA	
55	Loss	26–3–25	(United States) Layla McCarter	UD	8	Aug 13, 2011	(United States) Santa Ana Star Casino, Bernalillo, New Mexico, USA	
54	Win		(United States) DJ Morrison	UD		Oct 16, 2010	(United States) Sky Ute Casino, Ignacio, Colorado, USA	
53	Win		(United States) Lakeysha Williams	UD		Sep 29, 2009	(United States) Yesha Center, Philadelphia, Pennsylvania, USA	
52	Loss		(Canada) Jessica Rakoczy	UD		Apr 23, 2009	(United States) Tachi Palace Hotel & Casino, Lemoore, California, USA	
51	Loss		(Kenya) Fatuma Zarika	UD		Dec 20, 2008	Charter Hall, Nairobi, Kenya	interim Women's International Boxing Federation World super bantamweight title
50	Loss		(France) Anne Sophie Mathis	UD		Nov 22, 2008	Les Vielles Forges, Les Mazures, Ardennes, France	WBA World female super lightweight title
49	Loss		(Canada) Jaime Clampitt	UD		Mar 14, 2008	(United States) Twin River Event Center, Lincoln, Rhode Island, USA	International Women's Boxing Federation World lightweight title
48	Loss		(Canada) Jessica Rakoczy	UD	8	Feb 29, 2008	(United States) Tachi Palace Hotel & Casino, Lemoore, California, USA	NABF female lightweight title
47	Loss		(United States) Holly Holm	UD	10	Feb 7, 2008	(United States) Pechanga Resort & Casino, Temecula, California, USA	International Female Boxers Association World welterweight title
46	Loss		(Zambia) Esther Phiri	UD	8 (8)	Dec 1, 2007	Woodlands Stadium, Lusaka, Zambia	
45	Win		(United States) Melissa Del Valle	UD		Jun 15, 2007	(Zambia) Orleans Hotel & Casino, Las Vegas, Nevada, USA	Global Boxing Union Female World super lightweight title
44	Loss		(Brazil) Duda Yankovich	UD		Mar 17, 2007	Companhia Athletica Brooklyn, Sao Paulo, Sao Paulo, Brazil	Women's International Boxing Association World super lightweight title
43	Loss		(Canada) Jelena Mrdjenovich	UD		Feb 10, 2007	Delta South Hotel, Edmonton, Alberta, Canada	
42	Loss		(United States) Melissa Fiorentino	UD		Dec 1, 2006	(United States) Convention Center, Providence, Rhode Island, USA	
41	Loss		(United States) Layla McCarter	UD		Nov 17, 2006	(United States) Orleans Hotel & Casino, Las Vegas, Nevada, USA	vacant Global Boxing Union Female World lightweight title
40	NC		(Canada) Jessica Rakoczy	NC		Sep 2, 2006	(United States) Staples Center, Los Angeles, California, USA	
39	Loss		(France) Myriam Lamare	UD		Jul 17, 2006	La Palestre, Le Cannet, Alpes-Maritimes, France	WBA World female super lightweight title
38	Loss		(France) Myriam Lamare	UD		Mar 18, 2006	Palais des Sport Marcel Cerdan, Levallois-Perret, Hauts-de-Seine, France	WBA World female super lightweight title
37	Draw		(United States) Valanna McGee	PTS		Feb 3, 2006	(United States) Win-River Casino, Redding, California, USA	
36	Loss		(United States) Chevelle Hallback	UD		Nov 18, 2005	(France) Shaw Conference Centre, Edmonton, Alberta, Canada	Women's International Boxing Association World super featherweight title
35	Loss		(Japan) Emiko Raika	PTS	8	Oct 1, 2005	Roppongi Velfarre, Tokyo, Japan	
34	Win		(United States) Ann Saccurato	SD		Aug 26, 2005	(United States) Westchester County Center, White Plains, New York, USA	
33	Loss		(United States) Melissa Fiorentino	UD		Jul 8, 2005	(United States) Hampton Beach Casino, Hampton Beach, New Hampshire, USA	
32	Loss		(Canada) Kara Ro			Jun 10, 2005	(United States) State Fair Grounds, Detroit, Michigan, USA	vacant Women's International Boxing Association World lightweight title
31	Loss		(United States) Mary Jo Sanders	UD		May 14, 2005	(United States) Coushatta Casino Resort, Kinder, Louisiana, USA	
30	Loss		(Canada) Jessica Rakoczy	UD		Apr 1, 2005	(United States) Palace Indian Gaming Center, Lemoore, California, USA	International Boxing Association female lightweight title vacant WBA-NABA female lightweight title
29	Loss		(United States) Sumya Anani	UD		Jan 22, 2005	(United States) Coushatta Casino Resort, Kinder, Louisiana, USA	International Boxing Association female welterweight title
28	Win		(United States) Iva Weston	UD		Feb 28, 2004	(United States) Seminole Casino, Coconut Creek, Florida, USA	
27	Draw		(United States) Tracy Byrd	PTS		Jun 28, 2003	(United States) Seminole Casino, Coconut Creek, Florida, USA	
26	Win		(United States) Gina Greenwald			Mar 29, 2003	(United States) Seminole Casino, Coconut Creek, Florida, USA	
25	Win		(United States) Janae Archuleta	UD		Jan 18, 2003	(United States) Seminole Casino, Coconut Creek, Florida, USA	
24	Win		(United States) Carla Witherspoon	UD		Aug 30, 2002	(United States) Holiday Inn, Manchester, New Hampshire, USA	
23	Loss		(United States) Karla Redo	UD		May 12, 2000	(United States) Davidson Theatre, Pembroke Pines, Florida, USA	
22	Loss		(United States) Christy Martin	MD		Mar 3, 2000	(United States) Caesars Palace, Las Vegas, Nevada, USA	
21	Loss		(Russia) Zulfia Kutdyusova	MD		Aug 14, 1999	(United States) Loews Hotel, Miami Beach, Florida, USA	
20	Win		(United States) Mitzi Jeter	UD		May 29, 1999	Coliseo Roberto Clemente, San Juan, Puerto Rico	
19	Win		(United States) Glenda Watkins	UD		Mar 26, 1999	(United States) Park Plaza Hotel, Hialeah, Florida, USA	
18	Win		(United States) Carla Witherspoon	UD		Feb 26, 1999	(United States) Milander Auditorium, Hialeah, Florida, USA	
17	Win		(United States) Daniella Somers			Feb 5, 1999	(United States) Jai Alai Fronton, Miami, Florida, USA	
16	Loss		(United States) Denise Moraetes	UD		Dec 3, 1998	(United States) Casino Magic, Bay Saint Louis, Mississippi, USA	
15	Win		(United States) Tawayna Broxton	UD		Oct 16, 1998	(United States) Miccosukee Indian Gaming Resort, Miami, Florida, USA	
14	Draw		(United States) Jeanne Martinez	PTS		Oct 8, 1998	(United States) New Orleans, Louisiana, USA	
13	Win		(United States) Gail Grandchamp	TKO		Sep 12, 1998	(United States) Miccosukee Indian Gaming Resort, Miami, Florida, USA	
12	Win		(United States) Lasha Church	KO		Jun 27, 1998	(United States) North River Gym, Miami, Florida, USA	
11	Win		(United States) Jasmine Lawson	TKO		Apr 18, 1998	(United States) Miccosukee Indian Gaming Resort, Miami, Florida, USA	
10	Win		(United States) Sharon Tiller	TKO		Apr 3, 1998	Coliseo Ruben Rodriguez, Bayamon, Puerto Rico	
9	Win		(United States) Shannise Davis	TKO		Feb 18, 1998	(United States) Miccosukee Indian Gaming Resort, Miami, Florida, USA	
8	Win		(United States) Tawayna Broxton	UD		Oct 24, 1997	(United States) Classic Club, Hialeah, Florida, USA	
7	Win		(Puerto Rico) Hayde N'unez	TKO		Sep 27, 1997	Marriott Hotel, San Juan, Puerto Rico	
6	Win		(United States) Sue Chase	PTS		Aug 16, 1997	Lima, Peru	
5	Win		(United States) Lusell Aaron	TKO		Jun 22, 1997	Lima, Peru	
4	Win		(United States) Shanna Williams	TKO		May 30, 1997	(United States) Miccosukee Indian Gaming Resort, Miami, Florida, USA	
3	Loss		(United States) Dora Webber	UD		May 23, 1997	(United States) Charlotte Memorial Auditorium, Punta Gorda, Florida, USA	
2	Win		(United States) Stephanie Hopkins	TKO		Mar 14, 1997	(United States) Miccosukee Indian Gaming Resort, Miami, Florida, USA	
1	Win	1–0	(United States) Karen Nye	PTS	4	Feb 13, 1997	Milander Auditorium, Hialeah, Florida, USA	Professional debut

== See also ==
- List of Puerto Ricans
