= Ramona Kühne =

German boxer (born 1980)

Personal information
- Born: January 31, 1980 (age 46) Berlin, Germany
- Height: 5 ft 7 in (170 cm)
- Weight: Featherweight; Super featherweight; Lightweight

Boxing career
- Stance: Orthodox

Boxing record
- Total fights: 33
- Wins: 32
- Win by KO: 13
- Losses: 1

Ramona Kühne (born January 31, 1980) is a German former professional boxer.

== Professional career ==
Kühne turned professional in 2006 & compiled a record of 15–1 before facing and defeating Maribel Santana for the inaugural WBO super-featherweight title. She would defend the title eight times including against Irma Balijagic Adler and Gina Chamie.

== Professional boxing record ==
33 fights	32 wins	1 loss
By knockout	13	1
By decision	19	0

No.	Result	Record	Opponent	Type	Round, time	Date	Location	Notes
33	Win	32–1	Klaudia Vigh	PTS	6	2021-10-30	KW Eventcenter, Königs Wusterhausen, Germany	
32	Win	31–1	Nana Dokadze	TKO	3 (6), 0:51	2021-06-26	Anhalt Arena, Dessau, Germany	
31	Win	30–1	Kamilla Boka	KO	1 (8), 1:41	2019-11-30	Glaspalast, Dessau, Germany	
30	Win	29–1	Nana Chakhvashvili	KO	3 (8), 0:30	2019-03-23	Sporthalle, Dorf Mecklenburg, Germany	
29	Win	28–1	Sylwia Maksym	UD	8	2018-10-27	Stadthalle, Weißenfels, Germany	
28	Win	27–1	Bojana Libiszewska	UD	8	2018-06-09	Kohlrabizirkus, Leipzig, Germany	
27	Win	26–1	Djemilla Gontaruk	UD	10	2017-07-08	Friedrich-Ebert-Halle, Ludwigshafen, Germany	Retained WBO super-featherweight title
26	Win	25–1	Ikram Kerwat	RTD	5 (10), 2:00	2016-07-16	Max-Schmeling-Halle, Berlin, Germany	Won vacant WBA International lightweight title
25	Win	24–1	Erika Kalderas	TKO	5 (10), 1:06	2015-11-14	Anhalt Arena, Dessau, Germany	Retained WBO super-featherweight title
24	Win	23–1	Doris Köhler	PTS	8	2015-08-01	Metropolis Halle, Potsdam, Germany	
23	Win	22–1	Gina Chamie	RTD	6 (10), 2:00	2014-03-28	MBS Arena, Potsdam, Germany	Retained WBO, WBF & WIBF super-featherweight titles
22	Win	21–1	Renata Domsodi	TKO	6 (10), 1:50	2013-12-06	Brandenburg Halle, Frankfurt an der Oder, Germany	Retained WBO, WBF & WIBF super-featherweight titles
21	Win	20–1	Halanna Dos Santos	UD	10	2013-03-02	MBS Arena, Potsdam, Germany	Retained WBO, WBF & WIBF super-featherweight titles
20	Win	19–1	Renata Domsodi	TKO	8 (10), 2:24	2012-01-14	Baden-Arena, Offenburg, Germany	Retained WBO, WBF & WIBF super-featherweight titles
19	Win	18–1	Arleta Krausova	UD	10	2011-04-09	Bordelandhalle, Magdeburg, Germany	Retained WBO, WBF & WIBF super-featherweight titles
18	Win	17–1	Irma Balijagic Adler	UD	10	2010-11-20	Freiberger Arena, Dresden, Germany	Retained WBO, WBF & WIBF super-featherweight titles
17	Win	16–1	Maribel Santana	KO	4 (10), 1:50	2010-06-04	Landesgartenschau, Aschersleben, Germany	Retained WIBF super-featherweight title; Won inaugural WBO & WBF super-featherweight titles
16	Loss	15–1	Ina Menzer	TKO	6 (10), 0:57	2010-01-09	Bordelandhalle, Magdeburg, Germany	For WBC, WBO and WIBF featherweight titles
15	Win	15–0	Zsofia Bedo	TKO	8 (8), 1:30	2009-11-28	Altes Funkwerk, Köpenick, Germany	
14	Win	14–0	Galina Gyumliyska	UD	10	2009-06-19	Tabor Hall, Maribor, Slovenia	Retained WIBF super-featherweight title
13	Win	13–0	Judy Waguthii	UD	10	2009-03-28	Mehrzweckhalle Grossziethen, Schönefeld, Germany	Won vacant WIBF super-featherweight title
12	Win	12–0	Dahianna Santana	UD	10	2008-11-28	Maritim Hotel, Magdeburg, Germany	Retained WIBF lightweight title
11	Win	11–0	Galina Ivanova	SD	10	2008-05-16	Ballhaus Arena, Aschersleben, Germany	Won vacant WIBF lightweight title
10	Win	10–0	Loli Munoz	UD	10	2007-10-13	Herrmann-Gieseler-Halle, Magdeburg, Germany	
9	Win	9–0	Daniela David	UD	6	2007-08-18	Altes Funkwerk, Köpenick, Germany	
8	Win	8–0	Angel McKenzie	PTS	6	2007-03-31	Boxtempel, Weißensee, Germany	
7	Win	7–0	Monica Herzilla	PTS	6	2007-02-24	Mehrzweckhalle Grossziethen, Schönefeld, Germany	
6	Win	6–0	Dorota Kosatka	TKO	6 (6)	2006-11-11	Sportforum Oderstrasse, Neukölln, Germany	
5	Win	5–0	Olga Bojare	TKO	2 (4), 1:41	2006-10-28	EWE Arena, Fürstenwalde, Germany	
4	Win	4–0	Danielle Camerling	TKO	1 (6)	2006-09-16	Altes Funkwerk, Köpenick, Germany	
3	Win	3–0	Miroslava Durinova	UD	4	2006-07-14	Blue Box, Potsdam, Germany	
2	Win	2–0	Jarka Blahova	PTS	4	2006-05-25	Prestige Concertsaal, Neukölln, Germany	
1	Win	1–0	Natalija Dolgova	PTS	4	2006-04-21	Mehrzweckhalle Grossziethen, Schönefeld, Germany	

== See also ==
- List of female boxers

Sporting positions
Regional boxing titles
New title	WBA International lightweight champion July 16, 2016 – 2017; Vacated	Vacant Title next held by Stephanie Han
Minor world boxing titles
Vacant Title last held by Jelena Mrdjenovich	WIBF lightweight champion May 16, 2008 – 2010; Vacated	Vacant Title next held by Rola El-Halabi
Vacant Title last held by Isra Girgrah	WIBF super-featherweight champion March 28, 2009 – 2015; Vacated	Vacant Title next held by Kalliopi Kourouni
New title	WBF super-featherweight champion June 4, 2010 – 2015; Vacated	Vacant Title next held by Choi Hyun-mi
Major world boxing titles
Inaugural champion	WBO super-featherweight champion June 4, 2010 – 2018; Stripped	Succeeded by Ewa Brodnicka; Interim champion promoted
