= Ina Menzer =

Kazakhstani boxer (born 1980)

Personal information
- Born: 10 November 1980 (age 45) Atbasar, Kazakh SSR, USSR (now Kazakhstan)
- Height: 5 ft 5 in (165 cm)
- Weight: Featherweight

Boxing career
- Stance: Orthodox

Boxing record
- Total fights: 32
- Wins: 31
- Win by KO: 11
- Losses: 1

Ina Menzer (born 10 November 1980) is a Kazakhstani former professional boxer. She was inducted into the International Women's Boxing Hall of Fame in 2021.

== Professional career ==
Menzer turned professional in 2004 & compiled a record of 19–0 before beating Sandy Tsagouris to win the vacant WBC featherweight title. She became a unified champion five fights later when she beat Esther Schouten to win the inaugural WBO featherweight title. She suffered her only career defeat against Canadian contender Jeannine Garside.

== Professional boxing record ==
32 fights	31 wins	1 loss
By knockout	11	0
By decision	20	1

No.	Result	Record	Opponent	Type	Round, time	Date	Location	Notes
32	Win	31–1	Goda Dailydaitė	UD	10 (10)	2013-08-24	Warsteiner HockeyPark, Mönchengladbach, Germany	Won vacant WIBA featherweight title
31	Win	30–1	Renáta Dömsödi	TKO	2 (10)	2012-10-12	Sporthalle, Hamburg, Germany	
30	Win	29–1	Doris Köhler	UD	8 (8)	2012-04-21	Sport- und Kongresshalle, Schwerin, Germany	
29	Win	28–1	Milena Koleva	UD	8 (8)	2012-01-28	Grand Elysée, Hamburg, Germany	
28	Win	27–1	Ela Nunez	UD	8 (8)	2011-09-24	Dima-Sportcenter, Hamburg, Germany	
27	Loss	26–1	Jeannine Garside	UD	10 (10)	2010-07-03	Porsche-Arena, Stuttgart, Germany	Lost WBC, WBO and WIBF featherweight titles
26	Win	26–0	Ramona Kuehne	TKO	6 (10)	2010-01-09	Bordelandhalle, Magdeburg, Germany	Retained WBC, WBO and WIBF featherweight titles
25	Win	25–0	Esther Schouten	MD	10 (10)	2009-10-10	Stadthalle, Rostock, Germany	Retained WBC and WIBF featherweight titles; Won inaugural WBO featherweight title
24	Win	24–0	Franchesca Alcanter	UD	10 (10)	2009-05-02	Halle 7, Bremen, Germany	Retained WBC and WIBF featherweight titles
23	Win	23–0	Esther Schouten	UD	10 (10)	2009-01-17	Burg-Waechter Castello, Düsseldorf, Germany	Retained WBC and WIBF featherweight titles
22	Win	22–0	Adriana Salles	UD	10 (10)	2008-11-22	Stadthalle, Rostock, Germany	Retained WBC and WIBF featherweight titles
21	Win	21–0	Stacey Reile	TKO	4 (10)	2008-05-31	Burg-Waechter Castello, Düsseldorf, Germany	Retained WBC and WIBF featherweight titles
20	Win	20–0	Sandy Tsagouris	UD	10 (10)	2008-03-08	KoenigPALAST, Krefeld, Germany	Retained WIBF featherweight title; Won vacant WBC featherweight title
19	Win	19–0	Laura Serrano	UD	10 (10)	2007-11-17	Bordelandhalle, Magdeburg, Germany	Retained WIBF featherweight title
18	Win	18–0	Yazmín Rivas	UD	10 (10)	2007-07-28	Burg-Waechter Castello, Düsseldorf, Germany	Retained WIBF featherweight title
17	Win	17–0	Maria Andrea Miranda	UD	10 (10)	2007-04-28	Koenig Pilsener Arena, Oberhausen, Germany	Retained WIBF featherweight title
16	Win	16–0	Kasha Chamblin	TKO	8 (10)	2006-12-02	Estrel Convention Center, Berlin, Germany	Retained WIBF featherweight title
15	Win	15–0	Lely Luz Florez	UD	10 (10)	2006-09-09	Bordelandhalle, Magdeburg, Germany	Retained WIBF featherweight title
14	Win	14–0	Fatuma Zarika	UD	10 (10)	2006-05-27	Zenith Halle, Munich, Germany	Retained WIBF featherweight title
13	Win	13–0	Maribel Santana	RTD	4 (10)	2006-04-08	Ostseehalle, Kiel, Germany	Retained WIBF featherweight title
12	Win	12–0	Galina Gyumliyska	TKO	6 (10)	2005-12-03	Bordelandhalle, Magdeburg, Germany	Retained WIBF featherweight title
11	Win	11–0	Silke Weickenmeier	UD	10 (10)	2005-10-22	Brandberge Arena, Halle, Germany	Won WIBF featherweight title
10	Win	10–0	Damaris Muthoni	UD	10 (10)	2005-09-10	Dm-Arena, Karlsruhe, Germany	
9	Win	9–0	Darya Voitko	TKO	2 (8)	2005-07-09	Life Sportpark Herrenkrug, Magdeburg, Germany	
8	Win	8–0	Austria Urbaez Urena	KO	1 (8)	2005-05-10	Pueblo Espanol, Palma de Mallorca, Spain	
7	Win	7–0	Jarka Blahova	UD	6 (6)	2005-04-19	Hermann-Wielandner-Halle, Bischofshofen, Austria	
6	Win	6–0	Viktoria Oliynyk	PTS	6 (6)	2005-03-29	Sporthalle, Hamburg, Germany	
5	Win	5–0	Yulia Kulikova	TKO	3 (4)	2005-02-15	Alte Reithalle, Stuttgart, Germany	
4	Win	4–0	Viktoria Oliynyk	UD	4 (4)	2004-09-21	Universum Gym, Hamburg, Germany	
3	Win	3–0	Petra Jachmanova	PTS	4 (4)	2004-06-22	Sportzentrum, Telfs, Austria	
2	Win	2–0	Andrea Medelina	TKO	1 (4)	2004-05-29	Ostseehalle, Kiel, Germany	
1	Win	1–0	Zsanett Erod	TKO	3 (4)	2004-03-30	Saaltheater Geulen, Aachen, Germany	

== See also ==
- List of female boxers

Sporting positions
Minor world boxing titles
Preceded by Silke Weickenmeier	WIBF featherweight champion 22 October 2005 – 3 July 2010	Succeeded by Jeannine Garside
Vacant Title last held by Amanda Serrano	WIBA featherweight champion 24 August 2013 – 2013; Vacated	Vacant Title next held by Lindsay Garbatt
Major world boxing titles
Vacant Title last held by Sharon Anyos	WBC featherweight champion 8 March 2008 – 3 July 2010	Succeeded by Jeannine Garside
Inaugural champion	WBO featherweight champion 10 October 2009 – 3 July 2010	Succeeded by Jeannine Garside
