= Dahianna Santana =

Dominican boxer (born 1984)

Personal information
- Born: Dahianna Santana Lazil; November 5, 1984 (age 41) Santo Domingo, Dominican Republic
- Height: 5 ft 7 1/2 in (171 cm)
- Weight: Super flyweight; Bantamweight; Super bantamweight; Featherweight; Super featherweight

Boxing career
- Reach: 67 in (170 cm)
- Stance: Orthodox

Boxing record
- Total fights: 56
- Wins: 41
- Win by KO: 17
- Losses: 15

Dahianna Santana Lazil (born November 5, 1984) is a Dominican professional boxer. She is a former IBF female featherweight champion.

== Professional career ==
Santana turned professional in 2002 and compiled a record of 27–5 before facing Stacey Reile for the inaugural IBF female featherweight title, losing via split decision on 31 March 2011. She would get another shot at the title in a rematch with Reile on 20 November 2011, which she won via unanimous decision. Santana would eventually vacate the title in 2014. She would aim for another title when she faced Francia Elena Bravo for the Interim WBA female featherweight title on 28 June 2014, winning via unanimous decision. Santana lost the title in her first defense against Anahí Ester Sánchez on 14 August 2015. Santana challenged WBC female super-featherweight champion Eva Wahlström on 18 March 2016, but lost by unanimous decision. She fought Amanda Serrano for the vacant WBO female bantamweight title on 22 April 2017, losing by technical knockout in the eighth round.

== Professional boxing record ==
46 fights	31 wins	15 losses
By knockout	17	5
By decision	14	10

No.	Result	Record	Opponent	Type	Round, time	Date	Location	Notes
56	Win	41–15	Rocio de Leon Query	KO	3 (6)	2025-03-08	Coliseo Carlos 'Teo' Cruz, Santo Domingo, Dominican Republic	
55	Loss	40–15	Oshae Jones	UD	6	2023-03-11	2300 Arena, Philadelphia, Pennsylvania, U.S.	
54	Loss	40–14	Mary McGee	RTD	4 (6)	2023-01-14	Good City Brewing, Milwaukee, Wisconsin, U.S.	
53	Win	40–13	Mirna Elizabeth La Hoz	KO	1 (6)	2022-07-10	Club de Villa Francisca, Santo Domingo, Dominican Republic	
52	Win	39–13	Rocio de Leon Query	UD	6	2022-02-20	Pabellon de Esgrima, Santo Domingo, Dominican Republic	
51	Win	38–13	Diana Collado	UD	4	2021-12-08	Cancha Venus Isabelita, Santo Domingo, Dominican Republic	
50	Win	37–13	Diana Collado	UD	6	2021-03-27	Coliseo Carlos 'Teo' Cruz, Santo Domingo, Dominican Republic	
49	Loss	36–13	Amanda Serrano	TKO	1 (8)	2020-12-16	Hotel Catalonia Malecon Center, Santo Domingo, Dominican Republic	
48	Loss	36–12	Melissa St. Vil	UD	6	2019-10-24	Generoso Pope Athletic Complex, Brooklyn, New York, U.S.	
47	Loss	36–11	Tiara Brown	RTD	4 (8)	2018-12-08	Bowie State University, Bowie, Maryland, U.S.	
46	Loss	36–10	Oshin Derieuw	UD	10	2018-11-10	Espace Francois Mitterrand, Hénin-Beaumont, France	For WBF light-welterweight title
45	Win	36–9	Zuleidy Diaz	KO	2 (4)	2018-04-29	Club el Millon, Santo Domingo, Dominican Republic	
44	Loss	35–9	Amanda Serrano	TKO	8 (10)	2017-04-22	Barclays Center, Brooklyn, New York, U.S.	For vacant WBO female bantamweight title
43	Loss	35–8	Eva Wahlström	UD	10	2016-03-18	Espoo Metro Areena, Espoo, Finland	For WBC super-featherweight title
42	Win	35–7	Diana Collado	UD	8	2015-12-12	Polideportivo de Haina, Santo Domingo, Dominican Republic	
41	Loss	34–7	Anahí Ester Sánchez	UD	10	2015-08-14	Club Comunicaciones, Pergamino, Argentina	Lost Interim WBA featherweight title
40	Win	34–6	Francia Elena Bravo	UD	10	2014-06-28	Sheraton Hotel, Santo Domingo, Dominican Republic	Won Interim WBA featherweight title
39	Win	33–6	Rocio de Leon Query	UD	6	2014-03-10	Polideportvo Eleoncio Mercedes, La Romana, Dominican Republic	
38	Win	32–6	Claudia Andrea López	UD	10	2013-04-27	Club Atlético Vélez Sarsfield, Buenos Aires, Argentina	Retained IBF featherweight title
37	Win	31–6	Helen Joseph	UD	10	2012-12-17	Dominican Fiesta Hotel & Casino, Santo Domingo, Dominican Republic	Retained IBF featherweight title
36	Win	30–6	Marisol Reyes	TKO	7 (10)	2012-08-12	Coliseo Carlos 'Teo' Cruz, Santo Domingo, Dominican Republic	Retained IBF featherweight title
35	Win	29–6	Diana Collado	RTD	2 (8)	2012-03-24	Palacio de Deportes, Santo Domingo, Dominican Republic	
34	Win	28–6	Stacey Reile	UD	10	2011-11-20	Texas Station, North Las Vegas, Nevada, U.S.	Won IBF featherweight title
33	Loss	27–6	Stacey Reile	SD	10	2011-03-31	Estadio Nacional, San José, Costa Rica	For inaugural IBF featherweight title
32	Win	27–5	Jennifer Encarnacion	UD	4	2010-11-29	Coliseo Pepe Mayen, San Pedro de Macorís, Dominican Republic	
31	Win	26–5	Yoseidy Alcantara Zarzuela	TKO	1 (8)	2010-10-16	Polideportivo, San Cristóbal, Dominican Republic	
30	Win	25–5	Anys Cedillo	UD	6	2010-09-18	Coliseo Carlos 'Teo' Cruz, Santo Domingo, Dominican Republic	
29	Win	24–5	Rocio de Leon Query	UD	6	2010-08-19	Dominican Fiesta Hotel & Casino, Santo Domingo, Dominican Republic	
28	Win	23–5	Marilyn Hernandez	UD	10	2010-07-03	Pabellon de Balonmano, Santo Domingo, Dominican Republic	
27	Win	22–5	Yoseydi Alcantara	TKO	5 (6)	2010-05-08	Elías Piña Province, Dominican Republic	
26	Win	21–5	Agnese Boza	UD	10	2009-11-21	Aachen, Germany	
25	Win	20–5	Jaqueline Nowack	PTS	4	2009-09-05	Flughafen Merzbrück, Aachen, Germany	
24	Win	19–5	Evelina Diaz	TKO	3 (6)	2009-08-22	Polideportivo, Nagua, Dominican Republic	
23	Win	18–5	Agnes Duzond	TKO	3 (4)	2009-07-10	Trotyl Bar & Lounge, Pétion-Ville, Haiti	
22	Win	17–5	Diana Collado	TKO	4 (4)	2009-06-29	Coliseo Carlos 'Teo' Cruz, Santo Domingo, Dominican Republic	
21	Win	16–5	Ruth Ester Cuello	KO	1 (6)	2009-03-30	Coliseo Carlos 'Teo' Cruz, Santo Domingo, Dominican Republic	
20	Win	15–5	Doris Köhler	RTD	1 (10)	2009-01-24	Trotyl Bar & Lounge, Pétion-Ville, Haiti	
19	Loss	14–5	Ramona Kühne	UD	10	2008-11-28	Maritim Hotel, Magdeburg, Germany	For WIBF lightweight title
18	Win	14–4	Diana Collado	TKO	4 (4)	2008-05-11	Coliseo Carlos 'Teo' Cruz, Santo Domingo, Dominican Republic	
17	Win	13–4	Escarlyn Fulgencio	TKO	1 (6)	2007-10-13	Club Luperon, Santo Domingo, Dominican Republic	
16	Loss	12–4	Ana María Torres	UD	10	2007-04-16	Coliseo Carlos 'Teo' Cruz, Santo Domingo, Dominican Republic	For WBC super-flyweight title
15	Win	12–3	Grecia Novas Mateo	UD	8	2006-02-25	Santo Domingo, Dominican Republic	
14	Win	11–3	Liliana Martinez	PTS	8	2005-12-10	Santo Domingo, Dominican Republic	
13	Win	10–3	Carolina Martinez de Moreta	TKO	5 (8)	2005-10-07	Coliseo Carlos 'Teo' Cruz, Santo Domingo, Dominican Republic	
12	Win	9–3	Grecia Novas Mateo	UD	10	2005-09-17	Coliseo Carlos 'Teo' Cruz, Santo Domingo, Dominican Republic	
11	Win	8–3	Luisa Maria Romero	UD	6	2005-07-22	Polideportivo De Sabana Perdida, Santo Domingo, Dominican Republic	
10	Win	7–3	Angela Garcia	UD	4	2005-06-25	Club Maquiteria, Santo Domingo, Dominican Republic	
9	Win	6–3	Delia Hoppe	PTS	6	2005-05-20	Santo Domingo, Dominican Republic	
8	Loss	5–3	Alesia Graf	RTD	4 (8)	2005-01-15	GETEC Arena, Magdeburg, Germany	
7	Win	5–2	Marie L'Heureux	UD	4	2004-11-14	Coliseo Carlos 'Teo' Cruz, Santo Domingo, Dominican Republic	
6	Win	4–2	Ruth Ester Cuello	TKO	1 (4)	2004-10-04	Casa de Los Clubes, Villa Juana, Dominican Republic	
5	Loss	3–2	Austria Urbaez Urena	PTS	4	2004-04-30	Club R.P. Acevedo, Santo Domingo, Dominican Republic	
4	Win	3–1	Jennifer Encarnacion	TKO	1 (4)	2002-10-25	San Pedro de Macorís, Dominican Republic	
3	Win	2–1	Diana Collado	UD	4	2002-08-30	Coliseo Carlos 'Teo' Cruz, Santo Domingo, Dominican Republic	
2	Win	1–1	Belkis Vasquez	UD	4	2002-05-20	La Romana, Dominican Republic	
1	Loss	0–1	Diana Collado	PTS	4	2002-05-10	Santo Domingo, Dominican Republic	

== See also ==
- List of female boxers

Sporting positions
World boxing titles
Preceded by Stacey Reile	IBF featherweight champion November 20, 2011 – 2014; Vacated	Vacant Title next held by Jennifer Han
New title	WBA featherweight champion Interim title June 28, 2014 – August 14, 2015	Succeeded by Anahí Ester Sánchez
