= Iboe =

Iboe or IBoE may refer to:

- InfiniBand over Ethernet (IBoE), in computer networking

== See also ==
- Ibu (disambiguation) (Dutch and former Indonesian spelling of Iboe)
- Igbo (disambiguation) (old spelling Iboe)
