= Cindy Serrano =

Puerto Rican boxer (born 1983)

Personal information
- Nickname: Checkmate
- Nationality: Puerto Rican
- Born: May 8, 1983 (age 43) Puerto Rico
- Height: 5 ft 6 in (168 cm)
- Weight: Featherweight; Super featherweight; Lightweight; Welterweight

Boxing career
- Stance: Orthodox

Boxing record
- Total fights: 36
- Wins: 27
- Win by KO: 10
- Losses: 6
- Draws: 3

Cindy Serrano (born May 8, 1983) is a Puerto Rican former professional boxer who held the WBO female featherweight title from 2016 to 2017. She also challenged for the WIBA featherweight title in 2005; the WIBA and WIBF welterweight titles in 2011; and the unified WBA and IBF female lightweight titles in 2018. Her younger sister, Amanda, is also a professional boxer. The pair became the first sisters to hold world titles from major sanctioning bodies at the same time after Cindy captured the WBO title in 2016. Cindy Serrano is a member of the International Women's Boxing Hall of Fame.

== Professional career ==
Serrano made her professional debut on September 12, 2003, scoring a four-round unanimous decision (UD) victory against Kathy Rodriguez at Dover Downs in Dover, Delaware.

After compiling a record of 12–0 (7 KOs) she faced Rhonda Luna for the vacant WIBA featherweight title on December 10, 2005, at the Turning Stone Resort Casino in Verona, New York. The bout ended in a split draw, with one judge scoring the bout 96–94 in favour of Serrano, another judge scoring it 98–92 for Luna, while the third judge scored it even at 95–95.

Following three UD victories, she faced Melissa Fiorentino for the inaugural WBC-NABF female super featherweight title on July 7, 2007, at the Joseph L. Bruno Stadium in Troy, New York. Serrano suffered the first defeat of her career, losing via eight-round UD with all three judges scoring the bout 79–73. After the fight, Serrano required 20 stitches to close a cut on her eyelid sustained in the second round.

She suffered two more UD defeats in 2018—against former world champions Layla McCarter and Jessica Rakoczy in January and April respectively—before a three-year spell out of the ring. She returned to action in June 2011, fighting to a split draw against Oxandia Castillo.

Serrano's next fight came four months later, facing WIBA and WBF female welterweight champion Anne Sophie Mathis, with the vacant WIBF title also up for grabs, on October 1 at the Salle Mermoz in Yutz, France. Serrano suffered the fourth defeat of her career, losing via shutout UD with all three judges scoring the bout 100–90.

She bounced back from defeat with three UD victories in 2012 before defeating Grecia Nova via first-round technical knockout (TKO) on May 10, 2013, capturing the lightly regarded vacant UBF female super featherweight title at the Coliseo Carlos 'Teo' Cruz in Santo Domingo, Dominican Republic.

After defeating Diana Dominguez via UD in August 2013, Serrano fought Dominguez again on May 12, 2014, capturing the vacant UBF female lightweight title via ten-round UD at the Cancha del Congo in Santiago de los Caballeros, Dominican Republic.

Following four more fights—three wins (one by TKO) and a draw—Serrano faced former world title challenger Calista Silgado for the vacant WBO female featherweight title on December 10, 2016, at the Coliseo Cosme Beitia Salamo in Cataño, Puerto Rico. Serrano captured her first major world title, defeating Silgado via majority decision (MD) over ten rounds with two judges scoring the bout 99–91 and 96–94 in favour of Serrano while the third judge scored it a draw at 95–95. With the win, Serrano and her younger sister, Amanda, became the first sisters to hold major world titles at the same time.

She made one successful defence of her WBO title, defeating Paola Torres via UD on May 13, 2017, at the Coliseo Samuel Rodriguez in Aguas Buenas, Puerto Rico. All three judges scored the bout 97–93.

After an eight-round split decision (SD) victory in a non-title fight against Edina Kiss in October 2017, Serrano moved up to lightweight to challenge former Olympic gold medalist and reigning unified WBA and IBF female champion Katie Taylor. The bout took place on October 20, 2018, at the TD Garden in Boston, Massachusetts. In what was described as a dominant performance by Taylor, Serrano suffered the sixth defeat of her career, losing by a shutout UD with all three judges scoring the bout 100–90.

In October 2025, she was named among the inductees for the 2026 International Women's Boxing Hall of Fame class.

== Professional boxing record ==
36 fights	27 wins	6 losses
By knockout	10	0
By decision	17	6
Draws	3	

No.	Result	Record	Opponent	Type	Round, time	Date	Location	Notes
36	Loss	27–6–3	(Republic of Ireland) Katie Taylor	UD	10	Oct 20, 2018	(United States) TD Garden, Boston, Massachusetts, U.S.	For WBA and IBF female lightweight titles
35	Win	27–5–3	(Hungary) Edina Kiss	SD	8	Oct 14, 2017	(United States) Barclays Center, New York City, New York, U.S.	
34	Win	26–5–3	(Mexico) Paola Torres	UD	10	May 13, 2017	Coliseo Samuel Rodriguez, Aguas Buenas, Puerto Rico	Retained WBO female featherweight title
33	Win	25–5–3	(Colombia) Calista Silgado	MD	10	Dec 10, 2016	Coliseo Cosme Beitia Salamo, Cataño, Puerto Rico	Won vacant WBO female featherweight title
32	Win	24–5–3	(Hungary) Renáta Dömsödi	UD	6	Mar 3, 2016	(United States) BB King Blues Club & Grill, New York City, New York, U.S.	
31	Win	23–5–3	(Dominican Republic) Grecia Nova	UD	6	Nov 14, 2015	Sosua Convention Center, Puerto Plata, Dominican Republic	
30	Draw	22–5–3	(Kenya) Fatuma Zarika	SD	6	Mar 28, 2015	(United States) Resorts World Casino, New York City, New York, U.S.	
29	Win	22–5–2	(Dominican Republic) Carolina Martinez de Moreta	TKO	1 (6), 1:18	Nov 18, 2014	Sosua Club, Puerto Plata, Dominican Republic	
28	Win	21–5–2	(Dominican Republic) Diana Dominguez	UD	10	May 12, 2014	Cancha del Congo, Santiago de los Caballeros, Dominican Republic	Won vacant UBF female lightweight title
27	Win	20–5–2	(Dominican Republic) Diana Dominguez	UD	6	Aug 31, 2013	Sosua Bay Grand Casino, Puerto Plata, Dominican Republic	
26	Win	19–5–2	(Dominican Republic) Grecia Nova	UD	1 (10), 1:04	May 10, 2013	Coliseo Carlos 'Teo' Cruz, Santo Domingo, Dominican Republic	Won vacant UBF female super featherweight title
25	Win	18–5–2	(United States) Angel Gladney	UD	6	Nov 15, 2012	(United States) Plattduetsche Restaurant, Franklin Square, New York, U.S.	
24	Win	17–5–2	(Dominican Republic) Yoseidy Zarzuela	RTD	6 (8), 2:00	Sep 16, 2012	Club Pueblo Nuevo, Santo Domingo Este, Dominican Republic	
23	Win	16–5–2	(United States) Kerri Hill	UD	8	Aug 11, 2012	(United States) Plattduetsche Restaurant, Franklin Square, New York, U.S.	
22	Loss	15–5–2	(Sweden) Mikaela Laurén	UD	6	Apr 27, 2012	Cloetta Center, Linköping, Sweden	
21	Loss	15–4–2	(France) Anne Sophie Mathis	UD	10	Oct 1, 2011	Salle Mermoz, Yutz, France	For WIBA, WBF female, and vacant WIBF welterweight titles
20	Draw	15–3–2	(Dominican Republic) Oxandia Castillo	SD	6	Jun 25, 2011	Parque del Este, Santo Domingo, Dominican Republic	
19	Loss	15–3–1	(Canada) Jessica Rakoczy	UD	8	Apr 17, 2008	(United States) Tachi Palace, Lemoore, California, U.S.	
18	Loss	15–2–1	(United States) Layla McCarter	UD	6	Jan 11, 2008	(United States) The Orleans, Paradise, Nevada, U.S.	
17	Loss	15–1–1	(United States) Melissa Fiorentino	UD	8	Jul 7, 2007	(United States) Joseph L. Bruno Stadium, Troy, New York, U.S.	For WBC-NABF female super featherweight title
16	Win	15–0–1	(United States) Lakeysha Williams	UD	6	Jun 8, 2007	(United States) National Guard Armory, Philadelphia, Pennsylvania, U.S.	
15	Win	14–0–1	(United States) Jessica Mohs	UD	6	Feb 22, 2007	(United States) Roseland Ballroom, New York City, New York, U.S.	
14	Win	13–0–1	(United States) Tawnyah Freeman	UD	6	Jul 26, 2006	(United States) Hammerstein Ballroom, New York City, New York, U.S.	
13	Draw	12–0–1	(United States) Rhonda Luna	PTS	10	Dec 10, 2005	(United States) Turning Stone Resort Casino, Verona, New York, U.S.	For vacant WIBA featherweight title
12	Win	12–0	(Dominican Republic) Luisa Maria Romero	TKO	1 (8)	Oct 15, 2005	Santo Domingo, Dominican Republic	
11	Win	11–0	(Dominican Republic) Angela Garcia	UD	6	Aug 20, 2005	Constanza, Dominican Republic	
10	Win	10–0	(Dominican Republic) Delia Hoppe	UD	6	Jul 22, 2005	Polideportivo De Sabana Perdida, Santo Domingo, Dominican Republic	
9	Win	9–0	(United States) Chloritha Magee	TKO	2 (4), 1:13	May 7, 2005	(United States) Crown Plaza, Allentown, Pennsylvania, U.S.	
8	Win	8–0	(United States) Sharon Gaines	UD	6	Apr 8, 2005	(United States) Hanover Marriott, Whippany, New Jersey, U.S.	
7	Win	7–0	(United States) Susan Nance	TKO	1 (4)	Jul 11, 2004	(United States) Cedar Beach SportsFest, Allentown Pennsylvania, U.S.	
6	Win	6–0	(United States) Wanda Satterthwaite	TKO	1 (4), 1:35	Jul 7, 2004	(United States) Mountaineer Casino, Racetrack and Resort, New Cumberland, West Virginia, U.S.	
5	Win	5–0	(United States) Carla Witherspoon	SD	4	Jun 12, 2004	Cedarbridge Academy, Devonshire Parish, Bermuda	
4	Win	4–0	(United States) Helen Shari Pensin	TKO	1 (4)	Jan 2, 2004	(United States) Kahunaville Night Club, Wilmington, Delaware, U.S.	
3	Win	3–0	(United States) Shannon Birmingham	TKO	1 (4)	Dec 4, 2003	(United States) Days Inn, Allentown, Pennsylvania, U.S.	
2	Win	2–0	(United States) Kathy Rodriguez	TKO	2 (4), 0:33	Nov 13, 2003	(United States) Michael's Eighth Avenue, Glen Burnie, Maryland, U.S.	
1	Win	1–0	(United States) Kathy Rodriguez	UD	4	Sep 12, 2003	(United States) Dover Downs, Dover, Delaware, U.S.	

Sporting positions
Minor world boxing titles
Inaugural title	UBF female super featherweight champion May 10, 2013 – August 2013	Vacant Title next held by Jennifer Salinas
Inaugural title	UBF female lightweight champion May 12, 2014 – November 2014	Vacant
Major world boxing titles
Vacant Title last held by Amanda Serrano	WBO female featherweight champion December 10, 2016 – 2018; Vacated	Vacant Title next held by Heather Hardy
