= Stacey Reile =

American boxer (born 1973)

Personal information
- Nickname: Stay-Lo
- Born: Stacey Louise Reile; November 30, 1973 (age 52) Utica, New York, U.S.
- Height: 5 ft 4 1/2 in (164 cm)
- Weight: Featherweight

Boxing career
- Reach: 67 in (170 cm)
- Stance: Orthodox

Boxing record
- Total fights: 14
- Wins: 10
- Win by KO: 4
- Losses: 4

Stacey "stayLo" Reile (born November 30, 1987) is a female boxer who won the first IBF featherweight world championship for women. Reile was born in Utica, New York and lived there during her childhood. Reile later moved to South Florida and currently resides in Miami Beach, Florida.

== Amateur boxing ==
Upon moving to South Florida, Reile developed her fitness and won 1st place at the Miss Fitness South Florida competition in 1999. She also began training for boxing in the late 1990s under the tutelage of trainer Luis Lagerman and Women's International Boxing Association (WIBA) President Ryan Wissow. Reile had only two scheduled amateur matches. The first was to take place in the 126-pound division at the Florida State Golden Gloves tournament in 2000. Reile's opponent did not show up, so Reile won by a walkover. Reile also won her second amateur bout by defeating Vanessa Ramos. Although this was Reile's last fight as an amateur, she decided to delay turning pro and instead honed her craft in the gym for the next four years. Just a few days before her pro debut in 2004, Reile traveled to American Top Team in Coconut Creek, Florida, to spar with Shelby Walker. At the time of the sparring session, Walker was a veteran of 11 pro boxing fights and had challenged for a world featherweight title about two months before.

== Professional career ==
=== Early Fights ===
Reile made her professional debut against Myriam Bazile in Boynton Beach, Florida on July 24, 2004. Reile won by TKO. The referee waved off the bout at 1:07 of the second round when Bazile stopped throwing punches and was just trying to block the punches from Reile.

Reile participated in two unsanctioned bouts in Tokyo, Japan. The first was on March 13, 2005, against Riyo Togo, in which Reile won by a four-round unanimous decision. Togo suffered her first loss as a pro in this bout. After this fight, Reile appeared on The Learning Channel's Miami Ink, a reality television show about a tattoo shop in Miami Beach. Reile decided to get angel wing tattoos on her hips and became known as "The Fighting Angel." For her second unsanctioned bout, Reile returned to Tokyo to face MMA fighter–boxer Ariya. Reile won by a four-round unanimous decision on October 1, 2005.

Reile won by knockout at 37 seconds of the first round against Yessenia de Jesus on February 10, 2006, in Coral Gables, Florida. Reile landed a left hook to the head of de Jesus, which knocked her out. On April 21, 2006, Reile faced national amateur champion Nora Reyes of Chicago in Reyes' home state of Illinois. Reile won by majority decision.

Reile then faced Lakeysha "The Total Package" Williams on June 29, 2006, in Miami, Florida. Williams had gone the distance against world-class boxers such as Elena Reid, Ada Velez, Jeri Sitzes, and Kelsey Jeffries prior to her bout against Reile. Reile won by TKO when referee Jorge Alonso stepped in between the two boxers and waved off the fight just before the bell rang to end the round. The official stoppage time was 2:59 in the third round.

Reile won by a six-round unanimous decision against WIBA FedeLatina super bantamweight champion Delia Hoppe of the Dominican Republic on December 14, 2006, in Hallandale, Florida. Reile faced another opponent from the Dominican Republic in her next bout against Maribel Santana who had challenged for world titles three times before. Reile defeated Santana by a six-round unanimous decision on January 23, 2008. The fight took place in Reile's home city of Miami Beach, Florida.

=== Title Fights and Notable Fights ===
Reile fought for the world featherweight championship against WBC and WIBF featherweight champion Ina Menzer of Germany on May 31, 2008. The fight was in Germany. After campaigning as a super bantamweight for most of her career, Reile moved up to featherweight for her bout against Menzer. Menzer hit Reile on her left ear after the bell rang to end the third round. This ruptured Reile's eardrum and affected her equilibrium. With Reile's equilibrium off, Menzer knocked Reile down in the fourth round. Reile immediately got up, but her trainer unexpectedly waved his arms, which forced the referee to stop the fight. Therefore, the bout was officially ruled a win for Menzer by TKO, even though Reile was standing at the time of the stoppage, which occurred at 1:39 of the fourth round.

Reile fought in the home state of another undefeated opponent when she faced Crystal "Choo Choo" Delgado of Houston, Texas, on March 26, 2009. The fight occurred in Humble, Texas, which is near Houston. The bout was fought at a catch weight of 128 pounds, which is midway between the featherweight limit of 126 pounds and the super featherweight limit of 130 pounds. Delgado rose before the count of ten, but the referee ruled he could not continue and waved off the fight. The stoppage came at 23 seconds of the sixth round, and Reile won by TKO. After this fight, Reile wanted a rematch with Menzer. Reile was the No. 1 ranked contender by the WIBF, but was never awarded another title shot against Menzer.

Reile lost an eight-round, unanimous decision to Ada Velez at super-bantamweight on February 27, 2010, in Miami, Florida.

Reile lost a ten-round unanimous decision to Elina Tissen of Germany on October 9, 2010, for the Global Boxing Union featherweight title. The fight was in Tissen's home country of Germany.

Reile won the vacant International Boxing Federation (IBF) female featherweight championship on March 31, 2011, against Dahiana Santana of the Dominican Republic by a split decision. The fight took place in San Jose, Costa Rica.

Reile won the IBF female featherweight title by unanimous decision and defeated Reile in her first title defense on November 20, 2011. The fight took place in Las Vegas, Nevada. This was the final fight of Reile's pro career.

== Professional boxing record ==
14 fights	10 wins	4 losses
By knockout	4	1
By decision	6	3

No.	Result	Record	Opponent	Type	Round, time	Date	Location	Notes
14	Loss	10–4	Dahianna Santana	UD	10	2011-11-20	Texas Station, North Las Vegas, Nevada, U.S.	Lost IBF featherweight title
13	Win	10–3	Dahianna Santana	SD	10	2011-03-31	Estadio Nacional, San José, Costa Rica	Won inaugural IBF featherweight title
12	Loss	9–3	Elina Tissen	UD	10	2010-10-09	Cultura - Sparkassentheater, Rietberg, Germany	For vacant GBU featherweight title
11	Loss	9–2	Ada Vélez	UD	8	2010-02-27	Electricians Union Hall, Miami, Florida, U.S.	
10	Win	9–1	Crystal Delgado	TKO	6 (6), 0:23	2009-03-26	Humble Civic Center Arena, Humble, Texas, U.S.	
9	Loss	8–1	Ina Menzer	TKO	4 (10), 1:39	2008-05-31	Burg-Waechter Castello, Düsseldorf, Germany	For WBC and WIBF featherweight titles
8	Win	8–0	Maribel Santana	UD	6	2008-01-23	Deauville Beach Resort, Miami Beach, Florida, U.S.	
7	Win	7–0	Delia Hoppe	UD	6	2006-12-14	Gulfstream Park, Hallandale Beach, Florida, U.S.	
6	Win	6–0	Lakeysha Williams	TKO	3 (6), 2:59	2006-06-29	American Airlines Arena, Miami, Florida, U.S.	
5	Win	5–0	Nora Reyes	MD	4	2006-04-21	Cicero Stadium, Cicero, Illinois, U.S.	
4	Win	4–0	Yessenia de Jesus	KO	1 (4), 0:37	2006-02-10	BankUnited Center, Coral Gables, Florida, U.S.	
3	Win	3–0	Ariya	UD	4	2005-10-01	Velfarre, Roppongi, Japan	
2	Win	2–0	Riyo Togo	UD	4	2005-03-13	Velfarre, Roppongi, Japan	
1	Win	1–0	Myriam Bazile	TKO	2 (4), 1:07	2004-07-24	Club Ovation, Boynton Beach, Florida, U.S.	

== See also ==
- List of female boxers

Sporting positions
World boxing titles
Inaugural champion	IBF featherweight champion March 31, 2011 – November 20, 2011	Succeeded by Dahianna Santana
