= Catherine Phiri =

Zambian boxer

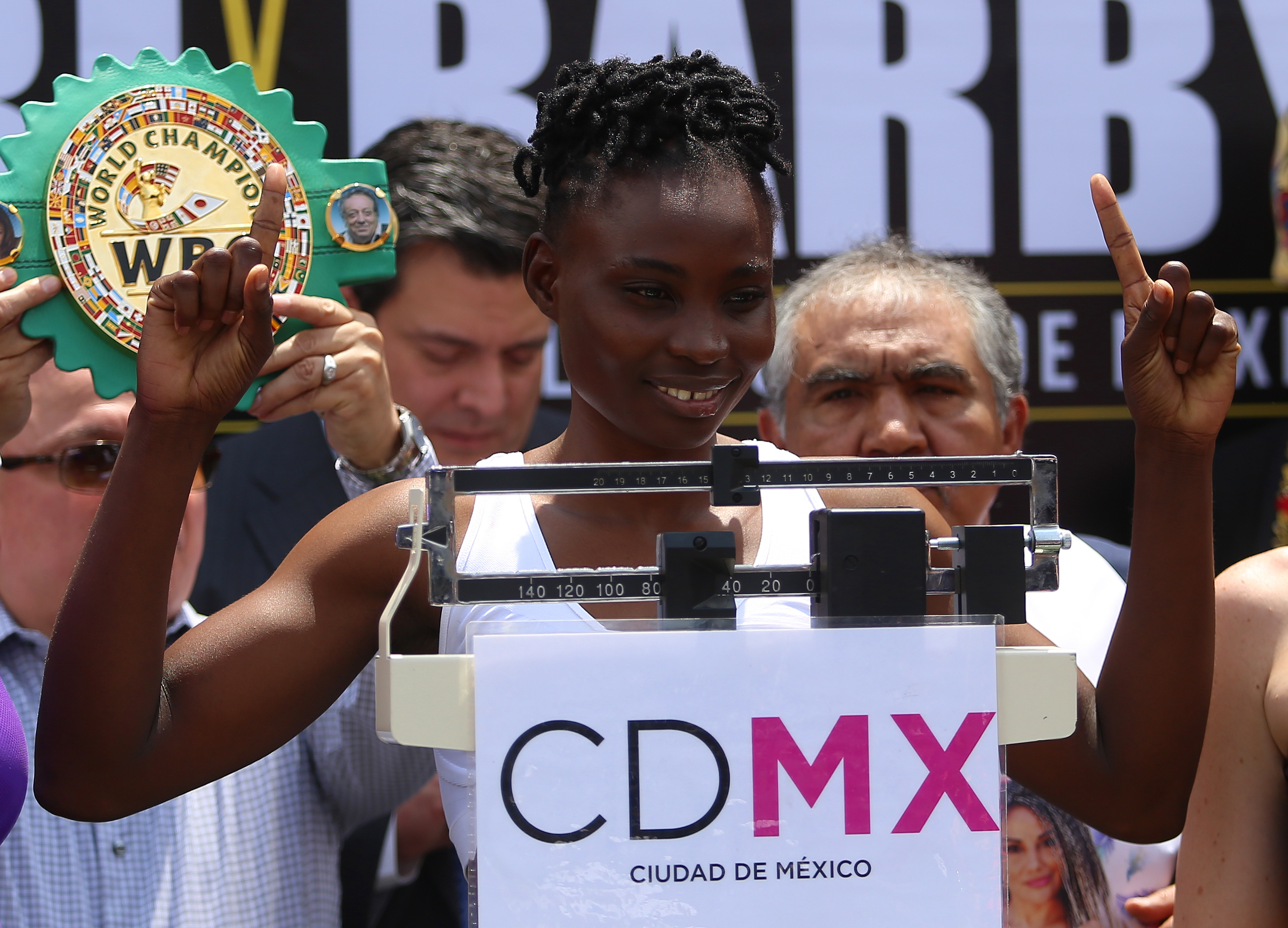
- Phiri in 2017

Personal information
- Born: Lusaka, Zambia
- Weight: Bantamweight; Super-bantamweight

Boxing career

Boxing record
- Total fights: 21
- Wins: 16
- Win by KO: 10
- Losses: 5

Catherine Phiri is a Zambian professional boxer. She held the WBC female bantamweight title from 2016 to 2017 and challenged twice for the WBC female super-bantamweight title in 2017 and 2019.

== Boxing career ==
Phiri debuted on 25 July 2011 when she defeated Zambian boxer Esther Chalwe at the National Sports Development Centre in Lusaka. She won the WBC female bantamweight title by defeating reigning champion Yazmín Rivas on 30 January 2016 in Mexico. She became the first Zambian to win a WBC title.

Her 13th fight was on 27 August 2016 at Lusaka's Government Complex where she retained her WBC title with a first-round stoppage victory against Gabisile Tshabalala. She lost the title in her next fight, suffering the second defeat of her career against Mariana Juárez on 1 April 2017, in Mexico City, Mexico.

On 17 December 2016, she was honoured by the World Boxing Council for being the first boxer from Africa to win the WBC bantamweight title. On 2 November 2017, she was defeated by Fatuma Zarika in a WBC super-bantamweight title fight, losing by unanimous decision with the judges' scorecards reading 97–92, 98–91 and 99–92. Zarika was the defending champion.

A rematch between Phiri and Zarika took place on 3 March 2019 at Kenyatta International Convention Centre, Nairobi, Kenya with the WBC title again on the line. Zarika won by unanimous decision.

Phiri faced Zimbabwe's Kudakwashe Chiwandire for the vacant WBC female interim super-bantamweight title on 26 February 2022, at the Government Complex in Lusaka, Zambia, losing by split decision.

Phiri was suspended from all boxing activities for two years in October 2022, after being found to have used a banned substance. She tested positive for the diuretic furosemide after her loss to Chiwandire in February. Phiri admitted her guilt and her ban was backdated to start from May 2022.

== Awards ==
Catherine Phiri was also given an academic scholarship from the Justina Mutale Foundations Scholarship Programme on 9 June 2016. She is expected to go and study Sports Management at the European School of Economics in Italy. President of Zambia Edgar Chagwa Lungu honoured Catherine Phiri with the Zambia insignia of meritorious achievement award for her accomplishment on Africa Freedom Day, 25 May 2017.

== Professional boxing record ==
21 fights	16 wins	5 losses
By knockout	10	0
By decision	6	5

No.	Result	Record	Opponent	Type	Round, time	Date	Location	Notes
21	Loss	16–5	Kudakwashe Chiwandire	SD	10	26 Feb 2022	Government Complex, Lusaka, Zambia	For vacant WBC female interim super-bantamweight title
20	Loss	16–4	Fatuma Zarika	UD	10	23 Mar 2019	Kenyatta International Convention Centre, Nairobi, Kenya	For WBC female super-bantamweight title
19	Win	16–3	Asandiswa Nxokwana	TKO	2 (8), 1:37	13 Oct 2018	Government Complex, Lusaka, Zambia	
18	Win	15–3	Halima Yazidu	KO	2 (8), 0:42	28 Apr 2018	City Mall, Solwezi, Zambia	
17	Win	14–3	Rukia Nasirite	TKO	2 (6), 2:27	30 Dec 2017	Government Complex, Lusaka, Zambia	
16	Loss	13–3	Fatuma Zarika	UD	10	2 Dec 2017	Carnivore Grounds, Nairobi, Kenya	For WBC female super-bantamweight title
15	Win	13–2	Flora Machela	KO	1 (6), 2:00	2 Jul 2017	Zmart Mall, Ndola, Zambia	
14	Loss	12–2	Mariana Juárez	UD	10	1 Apr 2017	Mexico City, Mexico	Lost WBC female bantamweight title
13	Win	12–1	Gabisile Tshabalala	TKO	1 (10), 1:00	27 Aug 2016	Government Complex, Lusaka, Zambia	Retained WBC female bantamweight title
12	Win	11–1	Yazmín Rivas	TD	6 (10), 2:00	30 Jan 2016	Centro de Convenciones, Rosarito Beach, Mexico	Won WBC female bantamweight title; Majority TD after Rivas was cut from an accidental head clash
11	Loss	10–1	Christina McMahon	MD	10	2 May 2015	Mulungushi Conference Centre, Lusaka, Zambia	For WBC interim female bantamweight title
10	Win	10–0	Bukiwe Nonina	TKO	2 (10)	22 Nov 2014	Government Complex, Lusaka, Zambia	Retained WBC Silver female bantamweight title
9	Win	9–0	Joyce Chileshe	PTS	4	3 May 2014	Mongu Stadium, Mongu, Zambia	
8	Win	8–0	Pia Mazelanik	KO	3 (10), 1:00	15 Mar 2014	Government Complex, Lusaka, Zambia	Won vacant WBC Silver female bantamweight title
7	Win	7–0	Hawa Daku	KO	8 (10)	28 Sep 2013	Mulungushi Conference Centre, Lusaka, Zambia	Won vacant African female bantamweight title
6	Win	6–0	Leslie Domingo	TKO	2 (10)	23 Mar 2013	Government Complex, Lusaka, Zambia	
5	Win	5–0	Nathalie Forget	UD	10	20 Oct 2012	Government Complex, Lusaka, Zambia	
4	Win	4–0	Hamisa Willy	RTD	4 (6), 2:00	31 Mar 2012	Government Complex, Lusaka, Zambia	
3	Win	3–0	Diana Makumbe	UD	4	29 Oct 2011	Konkola Stadium, Chililabombwe, Zambia	
2	Win	2–0	Cicilia Pitiseni	UD	4	3 Sep 2011	Maramba Stadium, Livingstone, Zambia	
1	Win	1–0	Esther Chalwe	PTS	4	28 May 2011	National Sports Development Centre, Lusaka, Zambia	
