= Diana Prazak =

Australian boxer (born 1979)

Personal information
- Nationality: Australian
- Born: 20 July 1979 (age 46) Melbourne, Australia
- Height: 5 ft 5 in (165 cm)
- Weight: Super-featherweight; Lightweight; Light-welterweight

Boxing career
- Stance: Orthodox

Boxing record
- Total fights: 18
- Wins: 14
- Win by KO: 9
- Losses: 4

Diana Prazak (born 20 July 1979) is an Australian professional boxer who held the WBC female super-featherweight title from 2013 to 2014. She is the first Australian boxer to have been ranked as the best active boxer, pound-for-pound, by BoxRec.

== Amateur career ==
At the age of 27, Prazak joined a local boxing gym to lose weight. She took her first amateur fight at 64 kg after six months of training. As an amateur fighter Prazak had six fights and won them all via stoppage. The last such fight was for a national title, making her the Australian Amateur Light Welterweight Champion. This was her last amateur fight before turning professional.

== Professional career ==
Prazak made her professional boxing debut on 13 March 2010 in Moonee Valley, Victoria, Australia. She was defeated via unanimous decision after six rounds with fellow Australian Sarah Howett. In 2012, she moved to Los Angeles and began training under Lucia Rijker.

In 2013, she fought against Super Featherweight Champion Frida Wallberg, who was defeated by her in Sweden with a knock out in the 8th round. Prazak won the title, Wallberg was hospitalized and received emergency surgery to relieve the pressure on her brain from a cerebral haemorrhage.

This fight, and the road leading to it, is captured in the documentary Bittersweet, showing Dutch former professional boxer Lucia Rijker training Diane to prepare her for the fight.

When Prazak retired from boxing, she had won 14 professional fights and lost 4. In 2025, Prazak was inducted into the International Women's Boxing Hall of Fame.

== Championships and accomplishments ==
- 2013 / 2014 – WBC Super Featherweight World Title (1 defense)
- 2011 / 2012 – WIBA Super Featherweight World Title (2 defenses)
- 2011 – PABA Super Featherweight Title
- 2011 – Australian Light Welterweight Title
- WIBA International Super Featherweight Title
- Australian Lightweight Champion
- Australian Amateur Light Welterweight Champion
- Women Boxing Archive Network World Super Featherweight Champion

== Professional boxing record ==
18 fights	14 wins	4 losses
By knockout	9	1
By decision	5	3

No.	Result	Record	Opponent	Type	Round, time	Date	Location	Notes
18	Loss	14–4	(United States) Kali Reis	MD	10	20 Aug 2021	(United States) Sycuan Casino, El Cajon, California, US	For WBA and vacant IBO female super lightweight titles
17	Win	14–3	(Mexico) Milagros Gabriela Díaz	UD	6	13 Mar 2021	Big Punch Arena, Tijuana, Mexico	
16	Loss	13–3	(Belgium) Delfine Persoon	TKO	9 (10), 1:28	11 Nov 2014	Zwevezele, West-Vlaanderen, Belgium	For WBC female lightweight title
15	Win	13–2	(Australia) Shannon O'Connell	TKO	5 (10), 1:56	1 Mar 2014	The Melbourne Pavilion, Melbourne, Australia	Retained WBC female super-featherweight title
14	Win	12–2	(Sweden) Frida Wallberg	KO	8 (10), 1:19	14 Jun 2013	Water Front Congress SAS Radisson, Stockholm, Sweden	Won WBC and WBAN female super-featherweight titles
13	Loss	11–2	(United States) Holly Holm	UD	10	7 Dec 2012	(United States) Route 66 Casino, Albuquerque, New Mexico, US	For vacant IBA and WBF female light-welterweight titles
12	Win	11–1	(Kenya) Fatuma Zarika	UD	10	20 Apr 2012	Grand Star Receptions, Altona North, Victoria, Australia	Retained WIBA super-featherweight title
11	Win	10–1	(United States) Lucia Larcinese	UD	6	19 Jan 2012	(United States) Hilton Garden Inn, Staten Island, New York, US	
10	Win	9–1	(Canada) Lindsay Garbatt	TKO	9 (10), 2:00	24 Sep 2011	Grand Star Receptions, Hobsons Bay, Australia	Won WIBA super-featherweight title
9	Win	8–1	(Thailand) Siriphon Chanbuala	TKO	3 (8), 1:08	13 Aug 2011	BoxingFit Arena, Melbourne, Australia	
8	Win	7–1	(United States) Bronwyn Wylie	UD	10	13 Jun 2011	Grand Star Receptions, Hobsons Bay, Australia	Won vacant PABA female and WIBA International super-featherweight titles
7	Win	6–1	(Australia) Eileen Forrest	KO	1 (6), 1:09	1 May 2011	Reggio Calabria Club, Moreland, Australia	
6	Win	5–1	(Australia) Malin Morgan	TKO	6 (8), 0:32	10 Apr 2011	Reggio Calabria Club, Moreland, Australia	Won vacant Australia female light-welterweight title
5	Win	4–1	(Thailand) Nong Tak Sakrungruang	TKO	6 (6), 1:00	21 Nov 2010	Reggio Calabria Club, Moreland, Australia	
4	Win	3–1	(Australia) Sara George	TKO	4 (6), 1:53	10 Oct 2010	Town Hall, Moreland, Australia	
3	Win	2–1	(Australia) Rachael Phillips	UD	4	17 Sep 2010	Whitehorse Club, Whitehorse, Australia	
2	Win	1–1	(Australia) Kay Hodgson	TKO	3 (4), 1:59	17 Jul 2010	Town Hall, Melbourne, Australia	
1	Loss	0–1	(Australia) Sarah Howett	UD	6	13 Mar 2010	Racecourse Reception Centre, Moonee Valley, Australia	

== Personal life ==
Prazak lives with her wife, Naomi, in Riverside County, California.

Achievements
Preceded by Frida Wallberg	WBC female super featherweight champion 14 June 2013 - 2015; Vacated	Vacant Title next held by Eva Wahlström
