= IBU =

IBU or Ibu may refer to:

== Acronyms ==
=== Education ===
- International Buddhist University (Shitennoji University), in Habikino, Osaka Prefecture, Japan
- Istanbul Bilgi University, a for-profit university in Istanbul, Turkey

=== Sports ===
- International Biathlon Union, the international governing body of biathlon
- International Boxing Union (1911–1946), Paris, France
- International Boxing Union (since 1996), a professional boxing sanctioning body founded in Atlanta, Georgia, United States

=== Other acronyms ===
- IBU, Par Pharmaceutical brand name for ibuprofen
  - Ibu-Tab and Ibu-Vivimed, Ibuprofen brand names
- IBU scale (International Bitterness Unit), measurement of bitterness in beer
- Inshore Boat Unit, a Naval Coastal Warfare unit of the United States Navy
- International Broadcasting Union, an alliance of European radio broadcasters
- Information Broadcast Unlimited, a Philippine radio and television network

== Other uses ==
- Ibrahim Mohamed Solih (born 1964), a Maldivian politician known as Ibu
- Ibu language, a dialect of Sahu language
- Ibu Pertiwi, a national personification of Indonesia (Ibu meaning mother)
- Ibu River, a river in Nigeria that runs near Sagamu
- Mount Ibu, an active volcano in Indonesia
- Ibu Hatela, a character played by Harish Patel in the 1998 film Gunda

== See also ==
- International Boxing Union (disambiguation)
