= Kudakwashe Chiwandire =

Zimbabwean boxer (born 1996)

Personal information
- Nickname: Take Money
- Born: 4 February 1996 (age 30) Harare, Zimbabwe
- Height: 5 ft 4 1/2 in (164 cm)
- Weight: Super-bantamweight

Boxing career
- Stance: Orthodox

Boxing record
- Total fights: 10
- Wins: 6
- Win by KO: 4
- Losses: 3
- Draws: 1

Kudakwashe Chiwandire (born 4 February 1996) is a Zimbabwean professional boxer who previously held the WBC female interim super-bantamweight title.

== Professional career ==
Chiwandire made her professional debut on 28 November 2015, scoring a four-round unanimous decision (UD) victory against Barbara Banda at the National Sports Development Centre in Lusaka, Zambia.

After compiling a record of 4–2–1 (4 KOs), she defeated former world champion Catherine Phiri via split decision (SD) over ten rounds, capturing the vacant WBC female interim super-bantamweight title on 26 February 2022, at the Government Complex in Lusaka.

On 18 March 2023, Chiwandire got the chance to upgrade to full champion status when she challenged WBC female super-bantamweight title holder Yamileth Mercado, but she lost the contest held in Chihuahua, Mexico, by unanimous decision.

== Professional boxing record ==
10 fights	6 wins	3 losses
By knockout	4	0
By decision	2	3
Draws	1	

No.	Result	Record	Opponent	Type	Round, time	Date	Location	Notes
10	Loss	6–3–1	Yamileth Mercado	UD	10	18 Mar 2023	Chihuahua City, Mexico	For WBC female super-bantamweight title
9	Win	6–2–1	Zulina Muñoz	UD	10	15 Oct 2022	Harare International Conference Center, Harare, Zimbabwe	Retained WBC female interim super-bantamweight title
8	Win	5–2–1	Catherine Phiri	SD	10	26 Feb 2022	Government Complex, Lusaka, Zambia	Won vacant WBC female interim super-bantamweight title
7	Draw	4–2–1	Patience Matara	MD	6	8 May 2021	Ministry of Information Studio, Harare, Zimbabwe	
6	Win	4–2	Euria Matoga	KO	3 (6), 1:35	28 Sep 2019	Harare International Conference Center, Harare, Zimbabwe	
5	Win	3–2	Joyce Chileshe	RTD	2 (10), 2:00	25 May 2019	Harare International Conference Center, Harare, Zimbabwe	
4	Loss	2–2	Netsai Bondayi	MD	6	4 May 2019	Magamba Hall, Harare, Zimbabwe	
3	Win	2–1	Definate Luwizhi	KO	3 (4)	23 Mar 2019	Magamba Hall, Harare, Zimbabwe	
2	Win	1–1	Cicilia Pitiseni	KO	1 (10)	20 Oct 2018	Nelson Mandela Hall, Harare, Zimbabwe	
1	Loss	0–1	Barbara Banda	UD	4	28 Nov 2015	National Sports Development Centre, Lusaka, Zambia	
