= Fatuma Zarika =

Kenyan female boxer (born 1985)

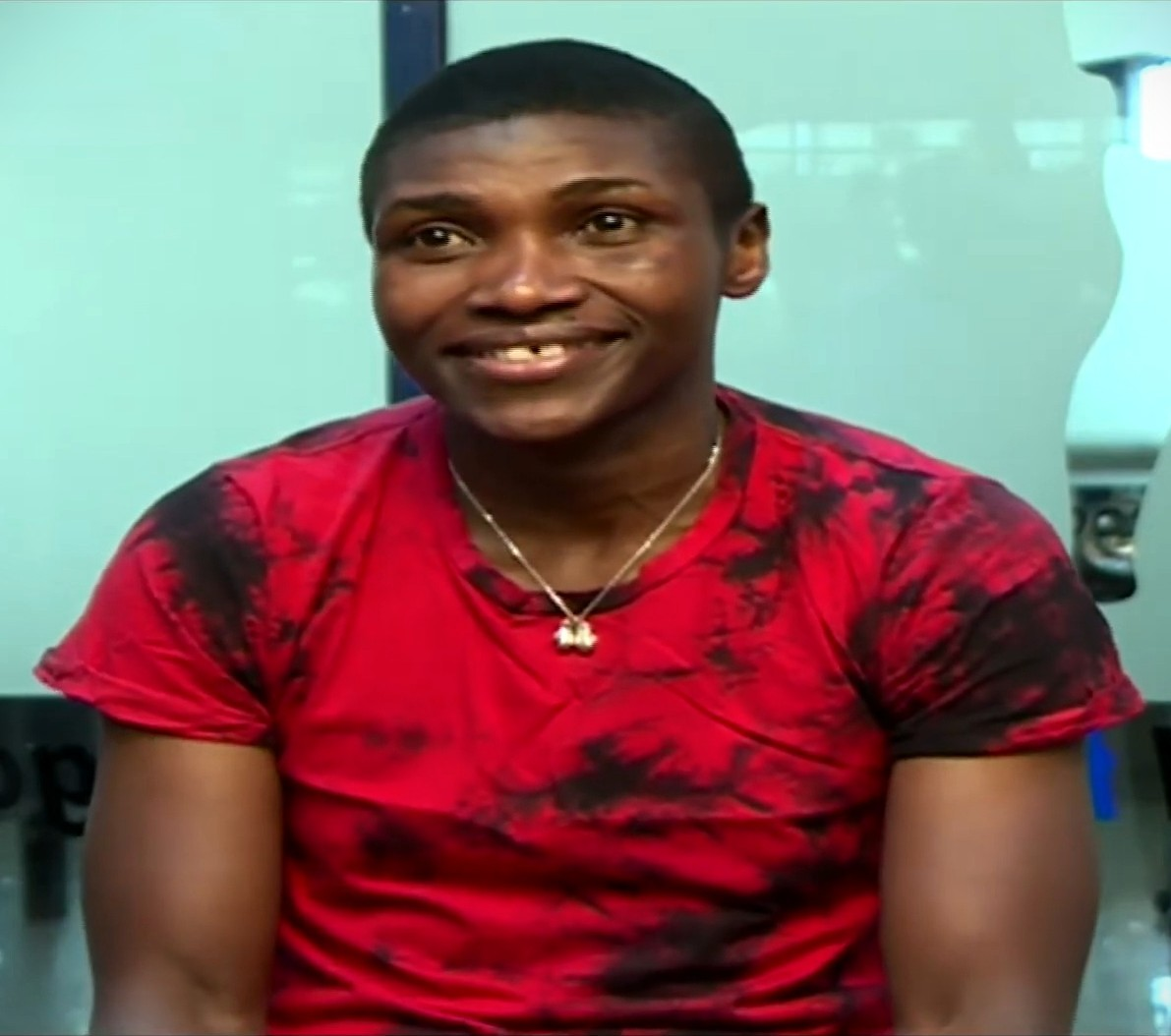
- Zarika in 2019

Personal information
- Nickname: Iron Fist
- Born: Zarika Njeri Kanghete; 13 March 1985 (age 41) Nairobi, Kenya
- Height: 163 cm (5 ft 4 in)
- Weight: Bantamweight; Super-bantamweight; Featherweight; Super-featherweight

Boxing career
- Reach: 168 cm (66 in)
- Stance: Orthodox

Boxing record
- Total fights: 51
- Wins: 35
- Win by KO: 18
- Losses: 14
- Draws: 2

Zarika Njeri Kanghete (born 13 March 1985), commonly known as Fatuma Zarika, is a Kenyan professional boxer. She held the WBC female super-bantamweight title from 2016 to 2019, becoming the first Kenyan to win a WBC title.

== Professional boxing record ==
51 fights	35 wins	14 losses
By knockout	18	0
By decision	17	14
Draws	2	

No.	Result	Record	Opponent	Type	Round, time	Date	Location	Notes
52	—N/a	—N/a	(Tanzania) Najma Isike	—N/a	– (8)	27 Feb 2026	Masshouse Arena, Nairobi, Kenya	
51	Win	35–14–2	(Tanzania) Halima Vunjabei	UD	8 (8)	21 Nov 2025	Masshouse Arena, Nairobi, Kenya	
50	Loss	34–14–2	(United Kingdom) Kirsty Hill	SD	10 (10)	11 May 2024	(United Kingdom) Winter Gardens, Blackpool, England	Lost challenge for the Commonwealth female super-featherweight title
49	Win	34–13–2	(Tanzania) Fatuma Yazidu	TKO	4 (10)	27 Oct 2023	Sarit Centre, Nairobi, Kenya	Won vacant WBF intercontinental female super-featherweight title
48	Win	33–13–2	(Zimbabwe) Patience Mastara	UD	10	13 Nov 2020	Next Door Arena, Dar es Salaam, Tanzania	Won vacant WBF female super-featherweight title
47	Loss	32–13–2	(Mexico) Yamileth Mercado	UD	10	16 Nov 2019	Polifórum, Ciudad Cuauhtémoc, Mexico	Lost WBC female super-bantamweight title
46	Win	32–12–2	(Zambia) Catherine Phiri	UD	10	23 Mar 2019	Kenyatta International Conference Centre, Nairobi, Kenya	Retained WBC female super-bantamweight title
45	Win	31–12–2	(Mexico) Yamileth Mercado	SD	10	8 Sep 2018	Kenyatta International Conference Centre, Nairobi, Kenya	Retained WBC female super-bantamweight title
44	Win	30–12–2	(Zambia) Catherine Phiri	UD	10	2 Dec 2017	Carnivore Grounds, Nairobi, Kenya	Retained WBC female super-bantamweight title
43	Win	29–12–2	(Tanzania) Flora Machela	KO	1 (8)	18 Feb 2017	Carnivore Grounds, Nairobi, Kenya	
42	Win	28–12–2	(Jamaica) Alicia Ashley	SD	10	1 Oct 2016	(United States) Dort Federal Event Center, Flint, Michigan, U.S.	Won WBC female super-bantamweight title
41	Win	27–12–2	(Dominican Republic) Grecia Nova	UD	6	24 Jun 2016	Polideportivo De Sabana Perdida, Santo Domingo, Dominican Republic	
40	Win	26–12–2	(Kenya) Hamisa Kassim	TKO	1 (6)	25 Dec 2015	Tamasha-Langata, Nairobi, Kenya	
39	Win	25–12–2	(Tanzania) Asha Ngedere	TKO	1 (6)	12 Dec 2015	Nyayo National Stadium, Nairobi, Kenya	
38	Loss	24–12–2	(Puerto Rico) Amanda Serrano	UD	6	10 Sep 2015	(United States) The Space at Westbury, Westbury, New York, U.S.	
37	Loss	24–11–2	(Puerto Rico) Amanda Serrano	UD	6	29 May 2015	(United States) W.C. Handy Pavilion, Memphis, Tennessee, U.S.	
36	Loss	24–10–2	(United States) Jennifer Han	UD	10	18 Apr 2015	(United States) County Coliseum, El Paso, Texas, U.S.	
35	Draw	24–9–2	(Puerto Rico) Cindy Serrano	SD	6	28 Mar 2015	(United States) Resorts World Casino, New York City, New York, U.S.	
34	Loss	24–9–1	(Finland) Eva Wahlström	UD	8	15 Nov 2014	Steveco-Areena, Kotka, Finland	
33	Loss	24–8–1	(Canada) Jelena Mrdjenovich	UD	10	1 Mar 2014	Shaw Conference Centre, Edmonton, Alberta, Canada	
32	Win	24–7–1	(Uganda) Fatuma Namugerwa	UD	4	18 May 2013	City Hall, Nairobi, Kenya	
31	Loss	23–7–1	(Belgium) Delfine Persoon	UD	8	23 Feb 2013	Sporthal Schiervelde, Roeselare, Belgium	
30	Loss	23–6–1	(Australia) Diana Prazak	UD	10	20 Apr 2012	Grand Star Receptions, Altona North, Australia	For WIBA super-featherweight title
29	Loss	23–5–1	(Germany) Elina Tissen	UD	10	23 Jul 2011	Cultura - Sparkassentheater, Rietberg, Germany	For GBC female super-bantamweight title
28	Win	23–4–1	(Uganda) Eva Zalwango	KO	1 (10)	2 Oct 2010	Toy Market Kibera, Nairobi, Kenya	
27	Win	22–4–1	(Tanzania) Flora Machela	TKO	2 (6)	17 Jul 2010	Pal Pal Gymnasium, Nairobi, Kenya	
26	Win	21–4–1	(Kenya) Susan Andeso	TKO	1 (4)	23 Jan 2010	Pal Pal Gymnasium, Nairobi, Kenya	
25	Loss	20–4–1	(Russia) Marina Krasheninnikova	UD	10	9 Dec 2009	Hotel Pyramida, Prague, Czech Republic	For WIBF Intercontinental super-featherweight title
24	Win	20–3–1	(Puerto Rico) Belinda Laracuente	UD	10	20 Dec 2008	Charter Hall, Nairobi, Kenya	Won WIBF interim super-bantamweight title
23	Win	19–3–1	(Tanzania) Jamhuri Said	TKO	1 (6)	21 Jun 2008	Club Afrique, Nairobi, Kenya	
22	Win	18–3–1	(Tanzania) Jamila Uroki	TKO	1 (6), 1:56	13 Apr 2008	Club Afrique, Nairobi, Kenya	
21	Win	17–3–1	(Uganda) Mulinde Natongo	TKO	1 (6), 2:45	29 Sep 2007	Club Afrique, Nairobi, Kenya	
20	Win	16–3–1	(Zimbabwe) Diana Makumbe	KO	1 (6), 1:35	14 Jul 2007	Moi International Sports Centre, Nairobi, Kenya	
19	Win	15–3–1	(Bulgaria) Iliana Boneva	RTD	7 (10), 2:00	6 May 2007	Hood Restaurant, Nairobi, Kenya	
18	Win	14–3–1	(Bulgaria) Galina Koleva Ivanova	UD	10	3 Mar 2007	Grand Regency Hotel, Nairobi, Kenya	Won WIBF bantamweight title
17	Win	13–3–1	(Thailand) Jubjaeng Sor Singsanay	UD	6	12 Dec 2006	Grand Regency Hotel, Nairobi, Kenya	
16	Win	12–3–1	(Czech Republic) Pavla Stankeová	TKO	2 (10), 1:19	12 Nov 2006	Grand Regency Hotel, Nairobi, Kenya	
15	Win	11–3–1	(Zimbabwe) Monalisa Sibanda	TKO	2 (10), 1:42	30 Jul 2006	Nyayo National Stadium, Nairobi, Kenya	
14	Loss	10–3–1	(Germany) Ina Menzer	UD	10	27 May 2006	Kulturhalle Zenith, Munich, Germany	For WIBF featherweight title
13	Win	10–2–1	(Uganda) Agnes Adonga	KO	5 (6)	26 Nov 2005	Moi International Sports Centre, Nairobi, Kenya	
12	Loss	9–2–1	(Hungary) Bettina Csábi	UD	10	10 Sep 2005	Főnix Hall, Debrecen, Hungary	For WIBF and GBU female bantamweight title
11	Win	9–1–1	(Zambia) Esther Phiri	PTS	4	21 Aug 2005	Moi International Sports Centre, Nairobi, Kenya	
10	Loss	8–1–1	(Sweden) Frida Wallberg	UD	10	17 Jun 2005	SAS Radisson, Aarhus, Denmark	For vacant WIBF Intercontinental super-featherweight title
9	Win	8–0–1	(Germany) Jasmin Kneiss	TKO	4 (6)	25 Mar 2005	Nyayo National Stadium, Nairobi, Kenya	
8	Win	7–0–1	(Kenya) Jane Kavulani	PTS	4	19 Dec 2004	Nyayo National Stadium, Nairobi, Kenya	
7	Win	6–0–1	(Kenya) Mary Njeri	PTS	4	31 Jul 2004	Nyayo National Stadium, Nairobi, Kenya	
6	Win	5–0–1	(Uganda) Agnes Adonga	PTS	4	10 Apr 2004	Nyayo National Stadium, Nairobi, Kenya	
5	Win	4–0–1	(Uganda) Hawa Daku	TKO	4 (4)	30 Dec 2003	Nyayo National Stadium, Nairobi, Kenya	
4	Draw	3–0–1	(Kenya) Conjestina Achieng	PTS	4	13 Dec 2003	Nyayo National Stadium, Nairobi, Kenya	
3	Win	3–0	(South Africa) Rukken Koronoso	TKO	3 (4)	29 Nov 2003	Kenya	
2	Win	2–0	(South Africa) Ester Herkole	PTS	4	19 Oct 2003	Nairobi, Kenya	
1	Win	1–0	(South Africa) Rukken Koronoso	PTS	4	12 Oct 2003	Nairobi, Kenya	

Sporting positions
Minor world boxing titles
Vacant Title last held by Bettina Csábi	WIBF bantamweight champion 3 March 2007 – May 2007	Vacant Title next held by Oksana Vasilieva
Vacant Title last held by Licia Boudersa	WBF female super featherweight champion 13 November 2020 – April 2023	Vacant Title next held by Licia Boudersa
World boxing titles
Preceded by Alicia Ashley	WBC female super bantamweight champion 1 October 2016 – 16 November 2019	Succeeded by Yamileth Mercado
