= Eva Voraberger =

Austrian boxer (born 1990)

Personal information
- Nickname: The Golden Baby
- Born: 7 February 1990 (age 36) Graz, Austria
- Height: 161 cm (5 ft 3 in)
- Weight: Super-flyweight, Bantamweight

Boxing career
- Reach: 160 cm (63 in)
- Stance: Orthodox

Boxing record
- Total fights: 36
- Wins: 28
- Win by KO: 12
- Losses: 8

Eva Voraberger (born 7 February 1990) is an Austrian former professional boxer. She twice won the IBO female super-flyweight title, in September 2015 and October 2016. Voraberger was also the WBC interim female bantamweight champion in 2018. She faced Amanda Serrano for the vacant WBO female super-flyweight title at Madison Square Garden Theater in New York City on 18 January 2019, but was knocked out in just 35 seconds. Voraberger retired from professional boxing in May 2023.
