= Frida Wallberg =

Swedish boxer (born 1983)

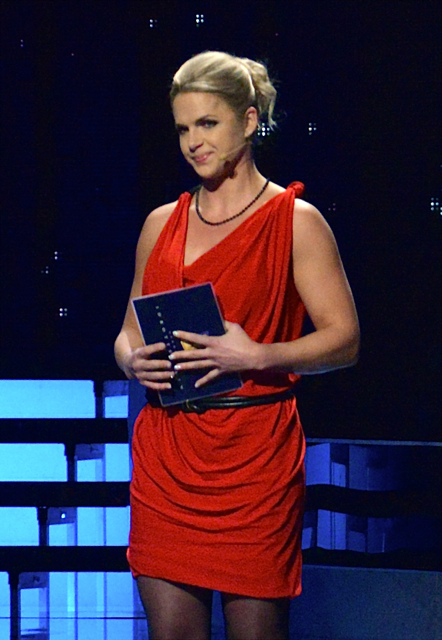

Personal information
- Nickname: Golden Globes
- Nationality: Swedish
- Born: April 28, 1983 (age 43) Åtvidaberg, Sweden
- Height: 5 ft 6 1/2 in (169 cm)
- Weight: Super-featherweight

Boxing career
- Stance: Orthodox

Boxing record
- Total fights: 12
- Wins: 11
- Win by KO: 2
- Losses: 1
Medal record
Women's amateur boxing
Representing Sweden
World Championships
Gold medal – first place	2001 Scranton	Light-welterweight

Frida Wallberg (born April 28, 1983) is a Swedish former professional boxer who competed between 2004 and 2013. She held the WBC female super-featherweight title from 2010 to 2013. Wallberg is a member of the International Women's Boxing Hall of Fame.

== Career ==
As an amateur, she won 48 of 53 matches before she turned pro in 2004. She has won the Nordic championship two times and the Swedish championship six times and, as a professional on 27 November 2010, Frida defeated the Canadian boxer Olivia Gerula for the WBC belt.

In June 2013, Wallberg was knocked out by Australian boxer Diana Prazak, suffering a cerebral hemorrhage. Wallberg was treated at Karolinska Institutet for the damage. The doctors successfully drained the blood. Over a month later she revealed in an interview that she had suffered complications from the knock out and she had no long-term plans for the future besides to rehabilitate and recover.

She was inducted into the International Women's Boxing Hall of Fame in 2025.

== Professional boxing record ==
12 fights	11 wins	1 loss
By knockout	2	1
By decision	9	0

No.	Result	Record	Opponent	Type	Round, time	Date	Location	Notes
12	Loss	11–1	(Australia) Diana Prazak	KO	8 (10)	14 Jun 2013	Water Front Congress SAS Radisson, Stockholm, Sweden	Lost WBC female super-featherweight title
11	Win	11–0	(Puerto Rico) Amanda Serrano	UD	10	27 Apr 2012	Cloetta Center, Linköping, Sweden	Retained WBC female super-featherweight title
10	Win	10–0	(Canada) Olivia Gerula	UD	10	3 Sep 2011	Karlstad CCC, Karlstad, Sweden	Retained WBC female super-featherweight title
9	Win	9–0	(Canada) Olivia Gerula	UD	8	27 Nov 2010	Johanneshov, Stockholm, Sweden	Won WBC female super-featherweight title
8	Win	8–0	(Switzerland) Nicole Boss	UD	6	24 Sep 2010	Sundsta Idrottshus, Karlstad, Sweden	
7	Win	7–0	(Romania) Irina Boldea	TKO	4 (6)	17 Sep 2010	Pabellon Municipal Villa de Onda, Valencia, Spain	
6	Win	6–0	(Kenya) Fatuma Zarika	UD	10	17 Jun 2005	SAS Radisson, Aarhus, Denmark	Won Vacant WIBF Intercontinental Super-featherweight title
5	Win	5–0	(Italy) Angela Cannizzaro	UD	6	15 Apr 2005	K.B. Hallen, Copenhagen, Denmark	
4	Win	4–0	(Bulgaria) Stoyanka Krasteva	UD	6	12 Nov 2004	Brøndby Hall, Brøndby, Denmark	
3	Win	3–0	(United States) Sharon Gaines	UD	4	3 Apr 2004	SAS Radisson, Aarhus, Denmark	
2	Win	2–0	(Ukraine) Viktoria Oliynyk	UD	4	13 Mar 2004	Brøndby Hall, Brøndby, Denmark	
1	Win	1–0	(Dominican Republic) Maribel Santana	TKO	1 (4)	6 Feb 2004	Falconer Centret, Copenhagen, Denmark	

Achievements
Preceded by Olivia Gerula	WBC female super featherweight champion November 27, 2010 - June 14, 2013	Succeeded by Diana Prazak
