= Sarah Mahfoud =

Danish boxer (born 1989)

Personal information
- Nationality: Danish
- Born: 29 September 1989 (age 36) Tórshavn, Faroe Islands
- Height: 5 ft 4 in (163 cm)
- Weight: Featherweight

Boxing career
- Stance: Orthodox

Boxing record
- Total fights: 16
- Wins: 14
- Win by KO: 3
- Losses: 2

Sarah Mahfoud (born 29 September 1989) is a Faroese-born Danish professional boxer who won the IBF female featherweight title in July 2020. She subsequently lost to Amanda Serrano in a title unification bout in Manchester on 24 September 2022. As of April 2024, she is ranked as the world's second best active female featherweight by BoxRec and The Ring.

== Professional career ==
Mahfoud made her professional debut on 11 February 2017, scoring a first-round technical knockout (TKO) victory over Petra Podraska at the Frederiksberghallen in Copenhagen, Denmark. She had three more fights that year, securing unanimous decision (UD) wins over Ainara Mota in April; Jessica Sanchez in June; and Gabriella Mezei in October.

She scored two fourth-round TKO victories in 2018 against Nana Chakhvashvili in January and Vanesa Caballero in September, followed by a UD win over Stephanie Ducastel in November.

She won her first professional title on 18 January 2019 at the Nykøbing Falster Hallen in Nykøbing, Denmark, by defeating Bukiwe Nonina for the vacant IBF Inter-Continental female featherweight title. All three judges scored the bout 100–90, 100–91 and 98–92 in favour of Mafhoud. She had one more fight that year; a UD win over Enerolisa de Leon in October.

Her first fight of 2020 was for the IBF interim female feather title against defending champion Brenda Carabajal. The bout took place at the Frederiksberghallen in Copenhagen, with Mahfoud winning via UD with scores of 100–90, 98–92 and 97–93.

Mahfoud faced Skye Nicolson for the vacant WBC women's featherweight title on 6 April 2024 in Las Vegas, losing a clear, one-sided unanimous decision.

== Professional boxing record ==
16 fights	14 wins	2 losses
By knockout	3	0
By decision	11	2

No.	Result	Record	Opponent	Type	Round, time	Date	Location	Notes
16	Loss	14–2	Skye Nicolson	UD	10	6 April 2024	Fontainebleau Las Vegas, Las Vegas, Nevada, U.S.	For vacant WBC world female featherweight title
15	Win	14–1	Marcela Acuña	UD	10	7 October 2023	Royal Arena, Copenhagen, Denmark	Retained WBC Silver female featherweight title
14	Win	13–1	Veronica Tosi	UD	8	26 May 2023	Royal Arena, Copenhagen, Denmark	
13	Win	12–1	Lara Ochmann	UD	10	4 March 2023	MusikTeatret, Albertslund, Denmark	Won vacant WBC Silver female featherweight title
12	Loss	11–1	Amanda Serrano	UD	10	24 September 2022	AO Arena, Manchester, England	Lost IBF world female featherweight title; For IBO, WBC, and WBO world female featherweight titles
11	Win	11–0	Nina Meinke	UD	10	21 April 2022	Frederiksberghallen, Copenhagen, Denmark	Retained IBF world female featherweight title
10	Win	10–0	Karen Carabajal	UD	10	1 February 2020	Frederiksberghallen, Copenhagen, Denmark	Won IBF interim female featherweight title
9	Win	9–0	Enerolisa de Leon	UD	8	12 October 2019	Frederiksborg Centret, Hillerød, Denmark	
8	Win	8–0	Bukiwe Nonina	UD	10	18 January 2019	Nykøbing Falster Hallen, Nykøbing Falster, Denmark	Won vacant IBF Inter-Continental female featherweight title
7	Win	7–0	Stephanie Ducastel	UD	8	24 November 2018	Frederiksberghallen, Copenhagen, Denmark	
6	Win	6–0	Vanesa Caballero	TKO	4 (8), 0:51	15 September 2018	Frederiksberghallen, Copenhagen, Denmark	
5	Win	5–0	Nana Chakhvashvili	TKO	4 (6), 0:47	5 January 2018	Frederiksberghallen, Copenhagen, Denmark	
4	Win	4–0	Gabriella Mezei	UD	6	27 October 2017	Frederiksberghallen, Copenhagen, Denmark	
3	Win	3–0	Jessica Sanchez	UD	4	17 June 2017	Ceres Arena, Aarhus, Denmark	
2	Win	2–0	Ainara Mota	UD	4	7 April 2017	Frederiksberghallen, Copenhagen, Denmark	
1	Win	1–0	Petra Podraska	TKO	1 (4), 0:29	11 February 2017	Frederiksberghallen, Copenhagen, Denmark	

== See also ==
- List of IBF female world champions

Sporting positions
Regional boxing titles
Vacant Title last held by Elena Gradinar	IBF Inter-Continental featherweight champion 18 February 2019 – January 2020; Vacated	Vacant
World boxing titles
Preceded by Brenda Carabajal	IBF female featherweight champion Interim title 1 February 2020 – 20 July 2020; Promoted to full champion	Vacant
Vacant Title last held by Jennifer Han	IBF female featherweight champion 20 July 2020 – 24 September 2022	Succeeded by Amanda Serrano
