= Amanda Serrano =

Puerto Rican boxer and mixed martial artist (born 1988)

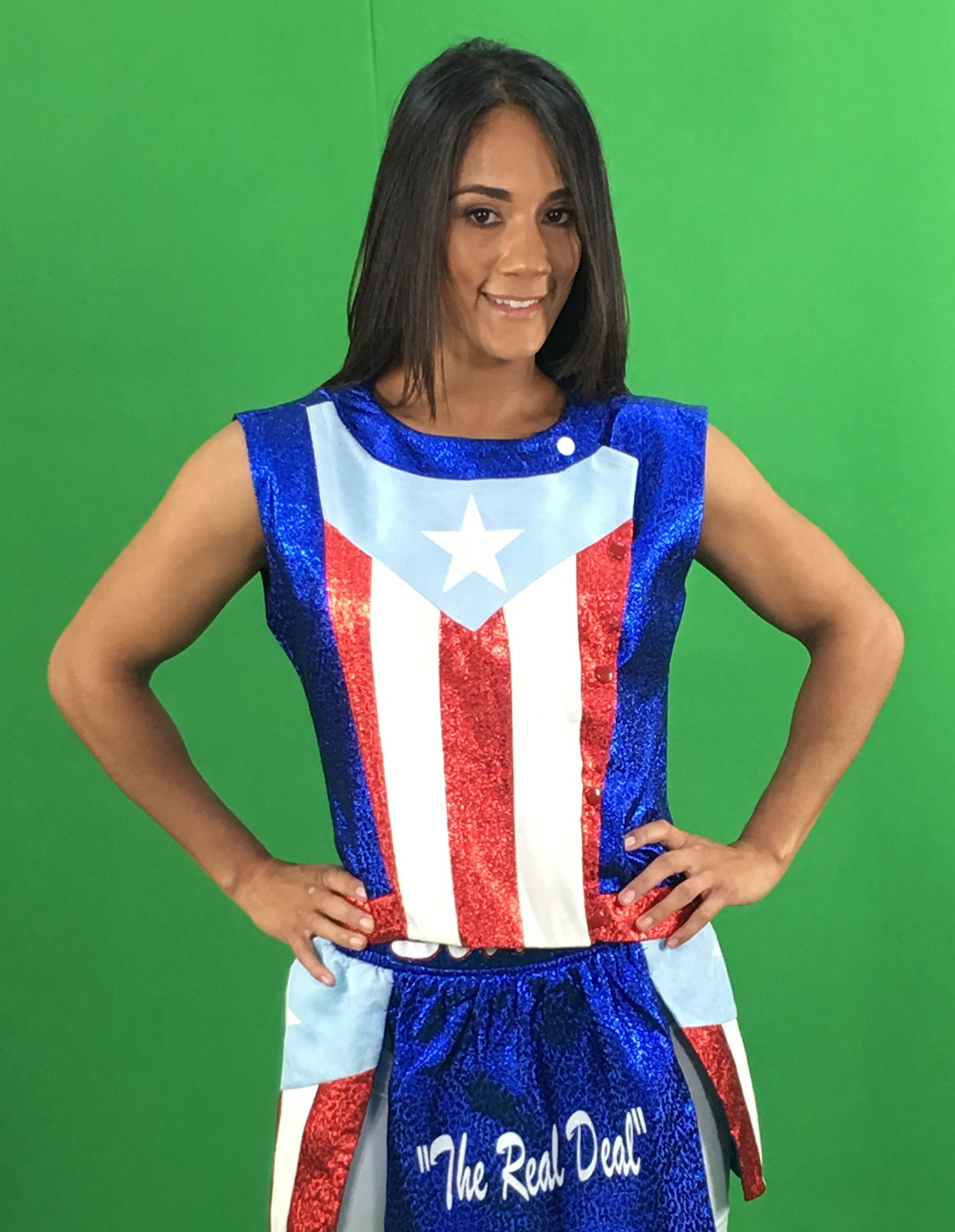
- Serrano in 2016
- Born: October 9, 1988 (age 38); Carolina, Puerto Rico
- Other name: The Real Deal
- Boxing career
- Height: 5 ft 6 in (168 cm)
- Weight: Super flyweight; Bantamweight; Super bantamweight; Featherweight; Super featherweight; Lightweight; Light welterweight
- Reach: 65 1/2 in (166 cm)
- Stance: Southpaw

Boxing record
- Total fights: 55
- Wins: 50
- Win by KO: 32
- Losses: 4
- Draws: 1
Medal record
Women's amateur boxing
New York Golden Gloves
Gold medal – first place	2008 New York City	Featherweight
- Martial arts career
- Weight: 137.4 lb (62 kg; 9 st 11 lb)
- Team: Real Deal Fight Team
- Years active: 2018–2021

Mixed martial arts record
- Total: 3
- Wins: 2
- By submission: 2
- Losses: 0
- Draws: 1

Other information
- Mixed martial arts record from Sherdog

Amanda Serrano (born October 9, 1988) is an American professional boxer and mixed martial artist. As a boxer, she is the unified featherweight world champion, having held the WBO title since 2019, IBO title since 2021 and the WBA title since 2023. She held the IBF title between 2022 and 2024 and the WBC title between 2021 and 2023. She is the first undisputed world champion, male or female, of the four-belt era from Puerto Rico, accomplishing this feat in 2023 at featherweight. She is the only Puerto Rican, male or female, to win world titles in more than four weight classes (seven weight classes), and holds the Guinness World Record for the most boxing world championships won in different weight-classes by a female, having held 9 major world titles across seven different weight classes. (Note: Serrano has won titles at super flyweight, bantamweight, super bantamweight, featherweight, super featherweight, lightweight and light welterweight.)

Serrano has been recognized as Women Boxing Archive Network (WBAN) Fighter of the Year five times (2016, 2019, 2021, 2023, 2024). She was also named Female Boxer of the Year three times (2016, 2018, 2019) by the WBO, an entity that granted her the first "Super World Championship" awarded to a woman. In June 2019, she was named Athlete of the Year by the Puerto Rican Day Parade committee, and in December 2019, she was named Ring 8 New York's Fighter of the Decade. She was additionally named Female Fighter of the Year by the Boxing Writers Association of America in 2021 and 2023.

As of December 2025, Serrano is ranked as the world's best active female featherweight by The Ring and BoxRec, and the third best active female, pound for pound, by ESPN and second by The Ring. She is signed to Jake Paul's boxing promotion Most Valuable Promotions after signing a lifetime deal with the company in March 2025.

== Early life ==
Serrano was born in the municipality of Carolina, where her sister Cindy was also born. Her grandparents were also born in the municipality of Carolina. When she was young, the family moved to New York and joined the large Puerto Rican diaspora there (colloquially known as Nuyoricans). Surrounded by this community, she grew up in an oasis of Puerto Rican culture in which traditional food and salsa music were predominant. Her upbringing is reflected in the manner in which she speaks Spanish, in a dialect with a distinct accent often attributed to that population (Spanglish) The family lived in Brooklyn, where she continued to live well into adulthood. During her youth she was an active child, with a distinct passion for swimming. After her older sister Cindy began boxing training intending to lose weight by attending the gym of her husband Jordan Maldonado, the 12-year old Serrano accompanied her there. She continued frequenting the facility and eventually got her first job there.

Initially Serrano was not as interested in the sport, not even attending a family event to watch the Oscar De La Hoya vs. Félix Trinidad fight, but she was an avid follower of Cindy's career and developed a passion for it as she grew older. When she graduated from Bushwick High School (located in Bushwick, Brooklyn and closed in 2006) at the age of 17, she decided to begin training as a method to buy things and bond with her sister Cindy. Her father supported her decision, but her mother was hesitant until she began earning success and saw it as a way for the elder sister to retire after having her second child. Cindy, knowing that she had already been frustrated during a previous sparring session against a boy, intended to dissuade her by stepping into the ring but the younger sister proved that she could defend herself competently. Admittedly shy, Serrano choose to continue in Maldonado's small gym in Queens with him as trainer, so that the flow of people was controlled and she could focus on her training.

== Amateur career ==
Serrano's amateur career was brief and concluded with a record of only 9–1, but she won the Staten Island amateur championship in 2008. From there she competed in the featherweight division of the New York Daily News Golden Gloves, where she defeated Glenyss Puentevella by referee stopping contest (RSC, the International Boxing Association's equivalent of a technical knockout) in the semifinal and decisioned USA Boxing's national champion Jody-Ann Weller in the final. Serrano is managed and trained by noted female American professional boxing trainer Jordan Maldonado of New York City. Serrano is Boxing 360's first world champion.

== Professional boxing career ==
=== Early career ===
On June 11, 2011, Serrano defeated Jennifer Scott to capture the vacant WBC–NABF featherweight title. The bout was scheduled for 8 rounds, but the match was cut quick as Serrano knocked out Scott in 1:04 of round one.

=== Super featherweight ===
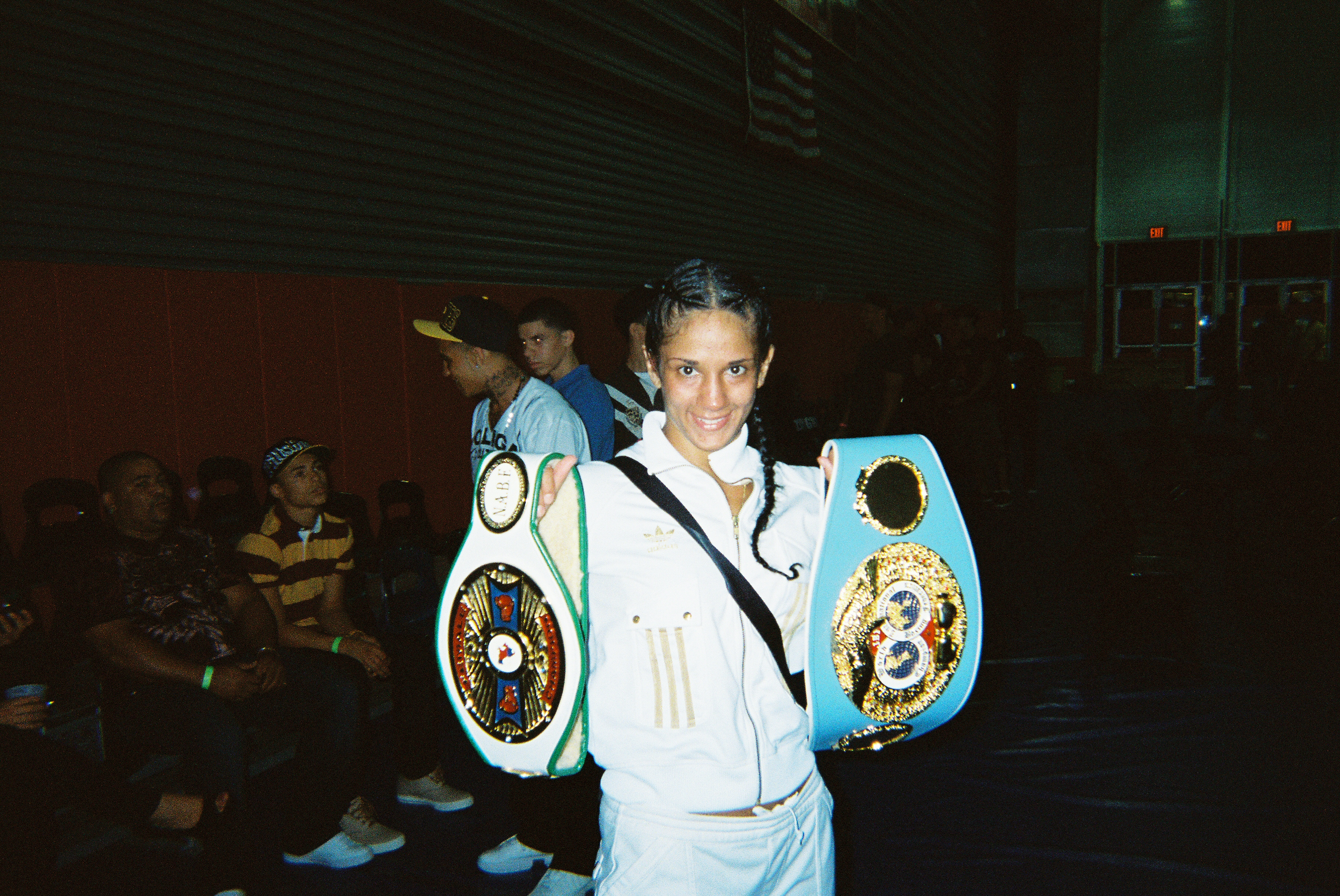
Serrano upon winning the IBF super featherweight title in 2011

Serrano was in line to face Fatuma Zarika for the vacant WBC super featherweight title, however, Zarika returned to her native Kenya due to an emergency, and was unable to return due to visa problems. On September 10, 2011, Serrano defeated WIBF Inter-Continental lightweight champion Kimberly Connor via second-round technical-knockout (TKO), for the vacant IBF super featherweight title.

==== Serrano vs. Wallberg ====
Her next fight took place on April 27, 2012, at the Cloetta Center, in Linköping, Sweden against undefeated WBC champion Frida Wallberg. The World Boxing Council—against mandatory rules—allowed the bout to be contested with 10 ounce gloves instead of the mandatory eight ounce for that division.

Serrano came up short losing a controversial unanimous decision to Wallberg. All three judges' scorecards were in favour of Wallberg with Gudjon Vilhelm scoring it 93–98, Venciclav Nikolov scoring it 93–97, and Franco Ciminale scoring it 94–96.

=== Quest for multi-division supremacy ===
Her sixth-round knockout (KO) win over Maria Maderna for the WBO lightweight title was held at the Argentine Boxing Federation Stadium. Maderna was going for her fourth title defense, but Serrano dominated the fight with her speed and power.

She next faced the former WBC super featherweight champion Olivia Gerula at the BB King Blues Club & Grill in New York City, New York. Serrano stated in a pre-fight interview that she wanted the winner of Matthysse vs. Mrdjenovich, as she expressed her desire to unify all four featherweight title. Serrano defeated Olivia Gerula via technical-knockout (TKO) in the first round to capture the vacant WBO featherweight title. Serrano then successfully defended her featherweight title by TKO against Calixta Silgado in Brooklyn.

On October 18, 2016, Serrano defeated Alexandra Lazar in the fifth round to capture the vacant WBO junior featherweight title. Already a three division champion, she moved back down to the junior featherweight limit to tie Miguel Cotto's record and become only the second Puerto Rican boxer, male or female, to win world titles in four weight classes.

==== Serrano vs. Santana I ====
In 2017, fighting on the Shawn Porter vs. Andre Berto undercard, Serrano dominated Dahianna Santana en route to an eighth-round KO victory to win the vacant WBO bantamweight belt, which made her the first female fighter in boxing history to win world titles in five weight divisions.

==== Serrano vs. Reynoso ====
On September 8, 2018, the Brooklyn-based hitter moved up an unprecedented five weight classes to defeat Yamilia Esther Reynoso via tenth round unanimous decision (UD), and captured the WBO light welterweight.

==== Serrano vs. Voraberger ====
On January 18, 2019, Serrano defeated Eva Voraberger in the first round to capture the vacant WBO super flyweight title. In doing so she became only the second male or female to capture a major title in seven weight classes after Manny Pacquiao.

=== Featherweight ===
==== Serrano vs. Hardy I ====
On September 13, 2019, Serrano defeated undefeated Heather Hardy (22–0), to capture the interim WBC and WBO featherweight title. The Brooklyn native dominated the 10 round bout with a score of 98–91, 98–91 98–92.

On February 4, 2021, Serrano was promoted to full WBC featherweight champion. The move came following a breakdown in talks regarding a targeted showdown with Edmonton's Jelena Mrdjenovich.

==== Serrano vs. Bermudez ====
On March 25, 2021, Serrano KO'd Daniela Bermudez with a body punch in round nine at Plaza del Quinto Centenario, San Juan, Puerto Rico. Serrano retained her WBC and WBO featherweight titles. Heading into the bout, Serrano and Bermudez were ranked inside The Ring's P4P top 10.

=== Lightweight ===
==== Serrano vs. Taylor ====
The first women's boxing match to headline Madison Square Garden, described as the 'biggest women's fight of all time', was held on April 30, 2022, between Katie Taylor and Serrano, with Taylor's undisputed lightweight titles on the line. Taylor defeated Serrano by split decision in what was named Fight of the Year by Sports Illustrated.

On February 5, 2023, it was announced that the rematch between Taylor and Serrano would take place on May 20 in Dublin, Ireland, for the undisputed lightweight championship of the world. However, on February 28, Serrano withdrew due to an injury she had sustained during training camp and Taylor fought undisputed light-welterweight champion Chantelle Cameron instead.

=== Return to featherweight ===
==== Serrano vs. Mahfoud ====
Upon returning to the featherweight division, Serrano was set to fight undefeated IBF champion Sarah Mahfoud in a title unification bout. Serrano resumed normal service on Saturday, responding to her second professional defeat earlier this year by picking up another world title with a unanimous-decision win. In a mostly one-sided affair, Serrano earned convincing scores of 99–92, 97–93, 97–93 to unify the world featherweight titles at the AO Arena.

==== Serrano vs. Cruz ====
Serrano faced WBA champion Erika Cruz on February 4 at Hulu Theatre in Manhattan, in an undisputed showdown for all four major world titles in the featherweight division. On fight night, Serrano defeated Cruz via unanimous decision with the scores of 98–92, 98–92, 97–93. With the win she also became the first undisputed champion, male or female, of the four-belt era from Puerto Rico.

==== Serrano vs. Hardy II ====
In the first defense of her undisputed featherweight titles, Serrano rematched Heather Hardy in the co-main event of the Jake Paul vs. Nate Diaz card on August 5, 2023. She won the fight by unanimous decision.

==== Serrano vs. Ramos ====
On October 27, 2023, Serrano defeated Danila Ramos via unanimous decision and retained her WBO, WBA and IBF world featherweight titles. It was the first women's world title fight held over twelve, three-minute rounds since 2007. The bout did not include the WBC belt as Mauricio Sulaiman, the WBC president, did not sanction the fight. He has cited studies and safety issues and the week prior to the fight told the BBC he was "praying that there will be no mishap or injury due to this deeply misguided and mistaken initiative."

On December 5, 2023, Serrano vacated the WBC title due to their refusal to sanction future female boxing matches at her desired twelve, three-minute rounds.

==== Cancelled Nina Meinke fight ====
On December 21, 2023, it was announced that Serrano would be defending her WBA, WBO and IBF featherweight titles in twelve-round bout against Nina Meinke at El Coliseo de Puerto Rico in San Juan, Puerto Rico. However, the fight was cancelled at the last minute, after Serrano was declared "medically unfit" by the Puerto Rican Boxing Commission due to an eye injury.

=== Super Lightweight ===
==== Serrano vs. Morgan ====
Serrano faced Stevie Morgan at the Amalie Arena in Tampa, FL on the Jake Paul vs. Mike Perry event on July 20, 2024. Serrano defeated Stevie Morgan by technical knockout in the second round.

==== Serrano vs. Taylor II ====
Serrano was originally scheduled to challenge Katie Taylor for her undisputed super lightweight title in a rescheduled rematch on July 20, 2024 at AT&T Stadium in Arlington, Texas on the Jake Paul vs. Mike Tyson card; the Serrano-Taylor fight was the co-main event on the card. However, after Mike Tyson suffered an ulcer flare-up, the event was postponed and took place at the same arena on November 15, 2024. Taylor was awarded the unanimous decision victory. According to Netflix, 50 million households throughout the world watched the Serrano-Taylor fight. Viewers said that Netflix repeatedly crashed during the fight.

==== Serrano vs. Taylor III ====
Serrano lost against Katie Taylor by majority decision on July 11, 2025 for the undisputed super lightweight title in a trilogy fight at Madison Square Garden in New York, headlining the first all-women's boxing card at the Garden, live on Netflix. In March 2025, prior to this fight, which was promoted by Jake Paul's promotion Most Valuable Promotions, she signed a lifetime contract with MVP. Besides competing for the promotion, Serrano will later serve as a chairwoman for the company and look after the promotion's women's boxing initiatives. She lost the fight against Taylor via majority decision - meaning that 3 of her 4 career losses had been inflicted by Taylor

==== Serrano vs. Tellez ====
Serrano was scheduled to defend her unified WBO and WBA featherweight titles in a rematch against Erika Cruz at Coliseo Roberto Clemente in San Juan, Puerto Rico, on January 3, 2026. On December 18, 2025, it was announced that the Cruz rematch was canceled due to "an atypical finding in Erika Cruz's Voluntary Anti-Doping Association (VADA) testing conducted prior to the event." Cruz was replaced by Reina Tellez. Serrano defeated Tellez, who failed to make the required weight limit, via unanimous decision in a fight contested over 10 three-minute rounds.

==== Serrano vs. Harrison ====
Serrano made her next defense against Cheyenne Hanson at County Coliseum in El Paso, Texas, U.S., on 30 May 2026, winning by technical knockout in the second round to register the 32nd stoppage victory of her career which equalled the record for most knockouts in women's boxing history set by Christy Martin in 2005.

==== Serrano vs. Manzur ====
Serrano faced Lucrecia Anabella Manzur at Pechanga Resort Casino in Temecula, California, on August 21, 2026, in the first world championship fight to be streamed live on TikTok. Contested over 12, two minute rounds, she won the bout via majority decision with two of the ringside judges both scoring it 116–112 in her favour, while the third had it a 114–114 draw. It was Serrano's 50th professional victory.

== Mixed martial arts career ==
=== Training ===
Since early 2015, Serrano quietly worked towards debuting in mixed martial arts (MMA), beginning by incorporating kicks to her training. The idea emerged after she participated in the filming of Fight Valley along her sister, meeting Miesha Tate, Holly Holm, and Cristiane Justino and learned of the lifestyle that they could afford. This triggered the interest of people involved in MMA and she was approached and told about the economic potential of the move. When queried about the matter, Serrano expressed additional motivation due to the absence of a Puerto Rican female fighter in Ultimate Fighting Championship (UFC) at the moment.

With the consent of her boxing trainer Jordan Maldonado, Serrano continued her introduction to kickboxing, citing a general lack of money for women in boxing. By the summer of 2016, Serrano admitted that she had seriously considered retiring to take up MMA due to frustration with the state of the business, but that being able to appear in ShoBox changed that. Instead, she began working towards becoming the first person to hold both boxing and MMA titles at once, setting her debut for late 2017. Towards this goal, she continued training in kickboxing under former world champion Luis Ruiz and incorporated Brazilian jiujitsu working with brown belt Gabriel Marte at the Dojo NYC.

==== Public challenge to Ronda Rousey ====
On July 31, 2015, Ronda Rousey's trainer, Edmond Tarverdyan, expressed the belief that his fighter "can win the boxing world title" while discussing a potential fight with Justino. After noting that "Ronda spars with boxing world champions that punch way harder than Cyborg", Tarverdyan claimed that she "has never lost a round in the gym. With boxing world champions". Within a week, Serrano responded by stating that "Rousey's trainer does not have any knowledge about the sport of boxing. She is a very good fighter in the Octagon, and I really congratulate her for everything she has done. Her opponents cannot box and it's easy to look great, but when facing a high quality boxer with punching power as myself, believe me, things are gonna change. In a boxing ring, the canvas will be your comfort zone".

She went on to criticize Rousey's stand-up fighting technique and challenging her to a boxing match, stating that "[from a] boxing point of view, she looked like a rookie amateur fighter, throwing very wide punches with no coordination. I heard that Cyborg is not willing to come down to the lightweight division to fight Ronda, but I can go up to 135, and we can settle a boxing match so I can prove her trainer wrong. I once went up to the lightweight division, and traveled to Argentina for a world title fight. At the end, the results was that I became the first ever Puerto Rican female boxer to captured a world title in two weight classes". Serrano's trainer noted that they "do not challenge other fighting styles." And that the reason for calling out Rousey was because they "represent boxing and [...] want to get some respect." by showing "Edmond Tarverdyan how wrong he is about boxing".

=== Combate Americas ===
In December 2017, Serrano announced that she had signed with Combate Americas, a MMA promotion that mostly featured Latin American fighters in its roster. Her debut was scheduled for April 13, 2018, when she drew with Corina Herrera after winning the first two rounds but losing the third when forced to the floor. Afterwards, Serrano focused on grappling. This training was put to the test on August 18, 2018, when she won gold in her first career jiu jitsu tournament, a Grappling Industries event held at New York where she gathered four submissions. After winning a sixth world championship in boxing, it was announced that MMA would be Serrano's focus in the foreseeable future due to better salaries.

On October 13, 2018, Serrano won her second fight by submitting Eréndina Ordóñez with a standing rear naked choke in the first round. In February 2019, she participated in her second jiu jitsu competition, defeating Erin Finkeldey in her only bout. Serrano was scheduled to headline her third MMA event (tentatively another fight with Dahiana Santana, making her debut), this one in Puerto Rico, on January 25, 2020. However, the card was postponed due to a series of earthquakes and ultimately cancelled. Serrano considered the "last minute" cancellation frustrating after missing the holidays due to her training. Afterwards, Combate Americas entered into a hiatus caused by the COVID-19 pandemic, remaining inactive until 2021. During this timeframe, Serrano's contract came to an end and she continued boxing.

=== iKON Fighting Federation ===
In May 2021, iKON announced her participation in the main event of a card held at Sinaloa and aired through UFC Fight Pass. On June 11, 2021, Serrano defeated Mexican Valentina García by submission (standing guillotine) in a minute.

=== Professional Fighters League ===
On August 2, 2023, it was announced that Serrano had signed with the Professional Fighters League (PFL).

== Professional wrestling career ==
At the same time that she made her involvement in MMA public, an interest in potentially joining WWE, noted in 2019, Serrano revealed that she had been training under Jonathan Figueroa (known by his ring name Amazing Red) to become a professional wrestler and that she would be performing for a promotion soon.

== Professional boxing record ==
55 fights	50 wins	4 losses
By knockout	32	0
By decision	18	4
Draws	1	

No.	Result	Record	Opponent	Type	Round, time	Date	Location	Notes
55	Win	50–4–1	Lucrecia Anabella Manzur	MD	12	Aug 21, 2026	Pechanga Resort Casino, Temecula, California, U.S.	Retained WBA, WBO, and The Ring female featherweight titles
54	Win	49–4–1	Cheyenne Hanson	TKO	2 (10), 2:25	May 30, 2026	El Paso County Coliseum, El Paso, Texas, U.S.	Retained WBA, WBO, and The Ring female featherweight titles
53	Win	48–4–1	Reina Tellez	UD	10	Jan 3, 2026	Coliseo Roberto Clemente, San Juan, Puerto Rico	Retained WBA, WBO, and The Ring female featherweight titles; Tellez ineligible to win titles due to missed weight
52	Loss	47–4–1	Katie Taylor	MD	10	Jul 11, 2025	Madison Square Garden, New York City, New York, U.S.	For WBA, WBC, IBF, WBO, IBO, and The Ring female light-welterweight titles
51	Loss	47–3–1	Katie Taylor	UD	10	Nov 15, 2024	AT&T Stadium, Arlington, Texas	For WBA, WBC, IBF, WBO, IBO, and The Ring female light-welterweight titles
50	Win	47–2–1	Stevie Morgan	TKO	2 (10), 0:38	Jul 20, 2024	Amalie Arena, Tampa, Florida, U.S.	
49	Win	46–2–1	Danila Ramos	UD	12	Oct 27, 2023	Caribe Royale Orlando, Orlando, Florida, U.S.	Retained WBA, IBF, WBO, IBO, and The Ring female featherweight titles
48	Win	45–2–1	Heather Hardy	UD	10	Aug 5, 2023	American Airlines Center, Dallas, Texas, U.S.	Retained WBA, WBC, IBF, WBO, IBO, and The Ring female featherweight titles
47	Win	44–2–1	Erika Cruz	UD	10	Feb 4, 2023	Hulu Theater, New York City, New York, U.S.	Retained WBC, IBF, WBO, IBO and The Ring female featherweight titles; Won WBA featherweight title
46	Win	43–2–1	Sarah Mahfoud	UD	10	Sep 24, 2022	AO Arena, Manchester, England	Retained WBC, WBO and IBO female featherweight titles; Won IBF and inaugural The Ring female featherweight titles
45	Loss	42–2–1	Katie Taylor	SD	10	Apr 30, 2022	Madison Square Garden, New York City, New York, U.S.	For WBA, WBC, IBF, WBO, and The Ring female lightweight titles
44	Win	42–1–1	Miriam Gutiérrez	UD	10	Dec 18, 2021	Amalie Arena, Tampa, Florida, U.S.	
43	Win	41–1–1	Yamileth Mercado	UD	10	Aug 29, 2021	Rocket Mortgage FieldHouse, Cleveland, Ohio, U.S.	Retained WBC, WBO, and IBO female featherweight titles
42	Win	40–1–1	Daniela Romina Bermúdez	KO	9 (10), 1:33	Mar 25, 2021	Plaza del Quinto Centenario, San Juan, Puerto Rico	Retained WBC and WBO female featherweight titles; Won vacant IBO female featherweight title
41	Win	39–1–1	Dahianna Santana	TKO	1 (8), 2:37	Dec 16, 2020	Hotel Catalonia Malecon Center, Santo Domingo, Dominican Republic	
40	Win	38–1–1	Simone Da Silva	TKO	3 (8), 2:37	Jan 30, 2020	Meridian at Island Gardens, Miami, Florida, U.S.	
39	Win	37–1–1	Heather Hardy	UD	10	Sep 13, 2019	Madison Square Garden Theater, New York City, New York, U.S.	Won WBO, WBC interim and vacant WBAN featherweight titles
38	Win	36–1–1	Eva Voraberger	TKO	1 (10), 0:35	Jan 18, 2019	Madison Square Garden Theater, New York City, New York, U.S.	Won vacant WBO female junior bantamweight title
37	Win	35–1–1	Yamila Esther Reynoso	UD	10	Sep 8, 2018	Barclays Center, New York City, New York, U.S.	Won vacant WBO female light-welterweight title
36	Win	34–1–1	Marilyn Hernandez	TKO	1 (10), 2:38	Nov 4, 2017	Barclays Center, New York City, New York, U.S.	
35	Win	33–1–1	Edina Kiss	TKO	3 (10), 1:00	Jul 21, 2017	Sheraton Puerto Rico Hotel & Casino, San Juan, Puerto Rico	Retained WBO female junior featherweight title
34	Win	32–1–1	Dahianna Santana	TKO	8 (10), 1:14	Apr 22, 2017	Barclays Center, New York City, New York, U.S.	Won vacant WBO female bantamweight title
33	Win	31–1–1	Yazmín Rivas	UD	10	Jan 14, 2017	Barclays Center, New York City, New York, U.S.	Retained WBO female junior featherweight title; Won vacant WBAN junior featherweight title
32	Win	30–1–1	Alexandra Lazar	TKO	5 (10), 1:10	Oct 18, 2016	Hotel Caribe Hilton, San Juan, Puerto Rico	Won vacant WBO female junior featherweight title
31	Win	29–1–1	Calixta Silgado	TKO	1 (10), 1:10	Jul 30, 2016	Barclays Center, New York City, New York, U.S.	Retained WBO female featherweight title
30	Win	28–1–1	Edina Kiss	TKO	4 (8), 1:20	Apr 22, 2016	Cancha Rubén Zayas Montañez, Trujillo Alto, Puerto Rico	
29	Win	27–1–1	Olivia Gerula	TKO	1 (10), 1:50	Feb 17, 2016	BB King Blues Club & Grill, New York City, New York, U.S.	Won vacant WBO female featherweight title
28	Win	26–1–1	Djemilla Gontaruk	TKO	3 (8)	Nov 20, 2015	Aviator Sports Complex, New York City, New York, U.S.	
27	Win	25–1–1	Fatuma Zarika	UD	6	Sep 10, 2015	The Space at Westbury, Westbury, New York, U.S.	
26	Win	24–1–1	Fatuma Zarika	UD	6	May 29, 2015	W.C. Handy Pavilion, Memphis, Tennessee, U.S.	
25	Win	23–1–1	Marisol Reyes	TKO	3 (8)	Feb 21, 2015	Sosua Convention Center, Puerto Plata, Dominican Republic	
24	Win	22–1–1	Carla Torres	TKO	1 (6)	Nov 13, 2014	The Space at Westbury, Westbury, New York, U.S.	
23	Win	21–1–1	Maria Elena Maderna	KO	6 (10), 1:26	Aug 15, 2014	Estadio F.A.B., Buenos Aires, Argentina	Won WBO female lightweight title
22	Win	20–1–1	Diana Garcia	TKO	1 (8)	Sep 29, 2013	Gimnasio Boxing Factory, Santiago de los Caballeros, Dominican Republic	
21	Win	19–1–1	Kerri Hill	TKO	2 (6)	Sep 21, 2013	Resorts World Casino, New York City, New York, U.S.	
20	Win	18–1–1	Dominga Olivo	TKO	3 (6)	Jun 29, 2013	Resorts World Casino, New York City, New York, U.S.	
19	Win	17–1–1	Wanda Pena Ozuna	TKO	1 (10)	Feb 16, 2013	Gran Arena del Cibao, Santiago de los Caballeros, Dominican Republic	Won vacant UBF female and WIBA featherweight titles
18	Win	16–1–1	Lina Tejada	TKO	1 (8)	Dec 15, 2012	Sosua Bay Grand Casino, Puerto Plata, Dominican Republic	Won vacant UBF InterContinental female super featherweight title
17	Win	15–1–1	Grecia Nova	TKO	1 (6)	Sep 16, 2012	Club Pueblo Nuevo, Villa Duarte, Dominican Republic	
16	Loss	14–1–1	Frida Wallberg	UD	10	Apr 27, 2012	Cloetta Center, Linköping, Sweden	For WBC female super featherweight title
15	Win	14–0–1	Ela Nunez	UD	8	Feb 17, 2012	Cicero Stadium 1909 S. Laramie, Cicero, Illinois, U.S.	
14	Win	13–0–1	Grecia Nova	TKO	5 (8)	Nov 18, 2011	Hotel Jaragua, Santo Domingo, Dominican Republic	
13	Win	12–0–1	Kimberly Connor	TKO	2 (10)	Sep 10, 2011	Aviator Sports Complex, New York City, New York, U.S.	Won vacant IBF female super featherweight title
12	Win	11–0–1	Diana Garcia	TKO	1 (8)	Aug 6, 2011	Parque del Este, Santo Domingo, Dominican Republic	
11	Win	10–0–1	Jennifer Scott	TKO	1 (8)	Jun 11, 2011	Roseland Ballroom, New York City, New York, U.S.	Won vacant WBC-NABF female featherweight title
10	Win	9–0–1	Ela Nunez	TKO	4 (6)	Apr 22, 2011	Fairgrounds Event Center, Hamburg, New York, U.S.	
9	Win	8–0–1	Ela Nunez	UD	6	Jan 29, 2011	Turning Stone Resort & Casino, Verona, New York, U.S.	
8	Win	7–0–1	Jennifer Encarnacion	RTD	4 (6)	Sep 18, 2010	Coliseo Carlos 'Teo' Cruz, Santo Domingo, Dominican Republic	
7	Win	6–0–1	Nydia Feliciano	UD	6	Jun 4, 2010	Tropicana Hotel & Casino, Atlantic City, New Jersey, U.S.	
6	Win	5–0–1	Lucia Larcinese	UD	6	Feb 26, 2010	Turning Stone Resort & Casino, Verona, New York, U.S.	
5	Draw	4–0–1	Ela Nunez	SD	4	Nov 20, 2009	Taj Majal Hotel & Casino, Atlantic City, New Jersey, U.S.	
4	Win	4–0	Christina Ruiz	TKO	2 (4)	Jul 31, 2009	Resorts Hotel & Casino, Atlantic City, New Jersey, U.S.	
3	Win	3–0	Carolina Martinez	TKO	1 (4)	Jun 29, 2009	Coliseo Carlos 'Teo' Cruz, Santo Domingo, Dominican Republic	
2	Win	2–0	Brittany Cruz	KO	1 (4)	May 9, 2009	DoubleTree Hotel, Orlando, Florida, U.S.	
1	Win	1–0	Jackie Trivilino	MD	4	Mar 20, 2009	Washington Avenue Armory, Albany, New York, U.S.	

== Mixed martial arts record ==
Professional record breakdown
3 matches	2 wins	0 losses
By submission	2	0
Draws	1	

Res.	Record	Opponent	Method	Event	Date	Round	Time	Location	Notes
Win	2–0–1	Valentina García	Submission (guillotine choke)	iKON Fighting Federation 7	June 11, 2021	1	1:00	Los Mochis, Sinaloa, Mexico	Strawweight debut.
Win	1–0–1	Erendira Ordóñez	Submission (rear-naked choke)	Combate 26: Mexico vs. USA	October 13, 2018	1	4:23	Tucson, Arizona, United States	
Draw	0–0–1	Corina Herrera	Draw (unanimous)	Combate 20: Combate Estrellas 1	April 13, 2018	3	5:00	Los Angeles, California, United States	Flyweight debut.

== Submission grappling record ==
5 matches, 5 wins (4 submissions)
Result	Record	Opponent	Method	Event	Division	Type	Date	Round	Time	Location	Notes
Win	5–0	(United States) Erin Finkeldey	Decision (unanimous)	Grappling Industries – BlueBelt No-Gi Jiu-Jitsu	-61 kg	No-Gi	February 23, 2019	1	5:00	(United States) Manhattan, New York, U.S.	
Win	4–0	(United States) Rebecca King	Submission (guillotine choke)	Grappling Industries – No-Gi Jiu-Jitsu	-61 kg	No-Gi	August 18, 2018	1		(United States) Manhattan, New York, U.S.	Tournament finals – (gold)
Win	3–0	(United States) Cristina Gardella	Submission (armbar)	Grappling Industries – No-Gi Jiu-Jitsu	-61 kg	No-Gi	August 18, 2018	1		(United States) Manhattan, New York, U.S.	Tournament semi-finals
Win	2–0	(United States) Lulu Zhong	Submission (guillotine choke)	Grappling Industries – No-Gi Jiu-Jitsu	-61 kg	No-Gi	August 18, 2018	1		(United States) Manhattan, New York, U.S.	Tournament quarter-finals
Win	1–0	(United States) Danielle Riendeau	Submission (guillotine choke)	Grappling Industries – No-Gi Jiu-Jitsu	-61 kg	No-Gi	August 18, 2018	1		(United States) Manhattan, New York, U.S.	Tournament preliminaries

== Personal life ==
After becoming a full-time boxer, Serrano adopted a seclusive routine that required not purchasing a cell phone (or any other device that allowed text messages and the sort) to avoid distractions and avoiding getting involved with boyfriends. When asked about it, she insisted that there would be time for that in the future, after carving a legacy. Serrano has noted that one of the prime movers in her boxing career has been to pursue records in possession of foreign athletes and securing them for Puerto Rico (for example, wanting to win a title in a sixth division so that a local could have bragging rights to more divisions than Floyd Mayweather Jr. or wanting to complete concurrent crossovers between sports).

Her older sister, Cindy, is also a professional boxer. The pair became the first sisters to hold world titles from major sanctioning bodies at the same time after Cindy won the WBO featherweight title in 2016.

== See also ==
- List of female boxers
- List of southpaw stance boxers
- List of Puerto Rican boxing world champions
- List of boxing septuple champions
- List of mixed martial artists with professional boxing records
- List of multi-sport athletes

Sporting positions
Regional boxing titles
Vacant Title last held by Maureen Shea	NABF female featherweight champion June 11, 2011 – August 2011	Vacant
Minor world boxing titles
Vacant Title last held by Licia Boudersa	IBO female featherweight champion March 25, 2021 – present	Incumbent
Major world boxing titles
Inaugural champion	IBF female super featherweight champion September 10, 2011 – 2012; Vacated	Vacant Title next held by Claudia Andrea Lopez
Preceded by Maria Elena Maderna	WBO female lightweight champion August 15, 2014 – 2015; Vacated	Vacant Title next held by Yohana Belen Alfonzo
Vacant Title last held by Alejandra Oliveras	WBO female featherweight champion February 17, 2016 – 2016; Vacated	Vacant Title next held by Cindy Serrano
Vacant Title last held by Sabrina Maribel Perez	WBO female junior featherweight champion October 18, 2016 – 2018; Vacated	Vacant Title next held by Dina Thorslund
Vacant Title last held by Sabrina Maribel Perez	WBO female bantamweight champion April 22, 2017 – 2017; Vacated	Vacant Title next held by Daniela Romina Bermúdez
Vacant Title last held by Ana Laura Esteche	WBO female junior welterweight champion September 8, 2018 – 2018; Vacated	Vacant Title next held by Christina Linardatou
Vacant Title last held by Raja Amasheh	WBO female junior bantamweight champion January 18, 2019 – June 2019; Vacated	Vacant Title next held by Miyo Yoshida
Preceded by Heather Hardy	WBO female featherweight champion September 13, 2019 – present	Incumbent
Vacant Title last held by Maureen Shea	WBC female featherweight champion Interim title September 13, 2019 – February 4, 2021; Promoted to full champion	Vacant Title next held by Sabrina Maribel Perez
Preceded by Jelena Mrdjenovich; Vacated	WBC female featherweight champion February 4, 2021 – December 5, 2023; Vacated	Vacant Title next held by Skye Nicolson
Preceded by Sarah Mahfoud	IBF female featherweight champion September 24, 2022 – July 19, 2024; Vacated	Vacant Title next held by Nina Meinke
Inaugural champion	The Ring female featherweight champion September 24, 2022 – present	Incumbent
Preceded by Erika Cruz	WBA female featherweight champion February 4, 2023 – present	Incumbent
Inaugural champion	Undisputed female featherweight champion February 4, 2023 – December 5, 2023; Titles fragmented	Vacant
