= International Boxing Union =

International Boxing Union may refer to:

- International Boxing Union (1913–1946), which recognized world title fights in the early 20th century and became the European Boxing Union in 1946.
- International Boxing Union (since 1996), a professional sanctioning body based in Georgia, USA.
