= Doris Köhler =

Austrian boxer (born 1975)

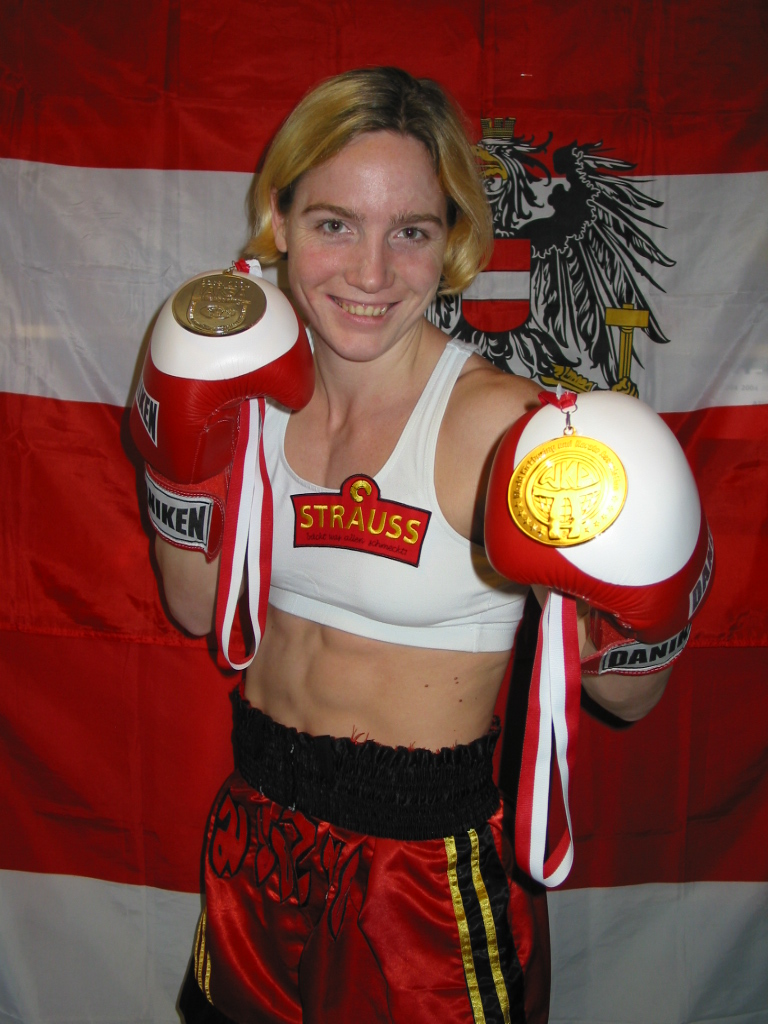
- Doris Köhler
- Born: September 15, 1975 (age 51); Vienna, Austria
- Nationality: Austrian
- Height: 5 ft 4 in (1.63 m)
- Weight: 117 lb (53 kg; 8.4 st)
- Division: bantamweight
- Reach: 70.0 in (178 cm)
- Style: Boxing
- Stance: Orthodox

Professional boxing record
- Total: 36
- Wins: 18
- By knockout: 5
- Losses: 16
- By knockout: 2
- Draws: 2

Kickboxing record
- Total: 43
- Wins: 38
- By knockout: 5
- Losses: 5

Other information
- Boxing record from BoxRec

Doris Köhler (born 15 September 1975 in Vienna) is an Austrian kickboxer and boxer. Since 2002, she has won a total of seven World Championships and four European Championship titles in light-and full-contact kickboxing according to the rules of the World Kickboxing Association (WKA), International Amateur Karate-Kickboxing Sport Association (IAKSA) and the International Sport Karate Association (ISKA). Since 2007, she has also competed in professional boxing competitions under the Women's International Boxing Federation (WIBF) rules.

== Amateur ==
Kohler's sporting ambitions began at the age of eight with judo which she learned at the Colop Samurai. At 17 years old, she moved to WTF-Taekwondo, where she won several national and international titles. At 19 she took up kickboxing at the Viennese Kampfsportverein Kumgang (Kumang Martial Arts Club). With encouragement from coaches Roman Sendor and Robert Kolerus, she soon became the best known member of the club. In the 2002 World Kickboxing Association World Championship in Marina di Massa, Italy, Köhler won a silver medal in full contact. In 2003, she won awards in Full Contact with lowkicks in Antwerp, Belgium, as well as in Light Contact in Killarney, Ireland. She competed, along with some 2600 athletes, in the Kickboxing World Championship, organized jointly in 2004 by the WKA and IAKSA associations and held in Basel, Switzerland. At this event Köhler won the gold medal in light contact and again won Full Contact with lowkicks. In 2005, she won the World Championship title in traditional Full Contact and Full Contact with lowkicks. At the IAKSA she won with traditional full contact, full contact with low kicks and in semicontact classes.

== Professional career ==
Since 2007, after a short detour to Austrian amateur boxing, Köhler has been more involved in WIBF professional boxing. Under the training of the Polish-Austrian ex-Olympic boxer, Jerzy Kisiel, and under the tutelage of the Karlsruhe coach and promoter, Jürgen Lutz, who already helped advance the career Regina Halmichs when she began, she tried to gain a foothold in international professional circus so that her successes as an amateur can continue.

She fought her first professional bout on 7 January 2007 in Knielingen against the German Isabell Hoher and won on points. Hoher ended her career afterwards. In her second fight on March 31 of the same year in Karlsruhe, Köhler drew against the German Kira Schnürer, who was undefeated to this date.

On 2 September 2007, Köhler was defeated by Nadia Raoui, who was also unbeaten. On 9 February 2008, she also lost on points against the strong Israeli Hagar Finer, WIBF title bearer at superfly and bantamweight. In the return match three weeks later in Israel, Köhler lost by a knock-out in the ninth round.

On 21 April 2012, Köhler fought in Schwerin against Ina Menzer, but lost on points.

== Others ==
Doris Köhler works as an association trainer with Kumgang Vienna and ASKÖ Penzing, where she teaches judo, taekwondo and kickboxing, and also gives personal training classes in these sports. She devotes herself very intensively to teaching young people combat sports.

== Greatest sporting successes ==
- 2009 European Champion in professional boxing (WIBF)
- 2009 Runner up Champion in full contact with Lowkicks (Villach / Austria, WAKO)
- 2007 European Championships Full-Contact Kickboxing with Lowkicks (Szentes / Hungary, ISKA)
- 2007 European champion full-contact kickboxer (Szentes / Hungary, ISKA)
- 2006 European Championships Full-Contact Kickboxing with Lowkicks (Augsburg / Germany, ISKA)
- 2006 European Championships Semicontact Kickboxing (Augsburg / Germany, ISKA)
- 2005 World Champion Full-Contact Kickboxing (Moscow / Russia, IAKSA)
- 2005 World Champion Full-contact kickboxing with lowkicks (Moscow / Russia, IAKSA)
- 2004 World champion Vollkontakt-Kickboxing with Lowkicks (Basel / Switzerland, WKA / IAKSA)
- 2004 World Champion Lightweight Kickboxing (Basel / Switzerland, WKA / IAKSA)
- 2003 World Champion Full-contact kickboxing with lowkicks (Antwerp / Belgium, WKA)
- 2003 World Champion Lightweight Kickboxing (Killarney / Ireland, WKA)
- 2002 World Champion Full-contact kickboxing (Marina di Massa / Italy, WKA)

== Professional boxing record ==
30 fights	12 wins	16 losses
By knockout	5	2
By decision	7	14
Draws	2	

No.	Result	Record	Opponent	Type	Round, time	Date	Location	Notes
30	Loss	12-16-2	Lucie Sedlackova			2017-03-11	Sportovni Hala Kralovka, Prague (Czechoslovakia)	
29	Loss	12-15-2	Sandra Atanassow			2016-04-16	Mach1, Karlsruhe (Germany)	
28	Loss	12-14-2	Ramona Kuehne			2015-08-01	Metropolis Halle, Potsdam (Germany)	
27	Win	12-13-2	Gabriella Mezei			2015-05-30	Reinhold-Heidinger-Sporthalle, Leibnitz (Austria)	
26	Loss	11-13-2	Elina Tissen			2013-06-01	Eissporthalle Essen, Essen (Germany)	GBC, WIBF World, GBUF World featherweight title
25	Win	12-12-2	Galina Gumliiska			2013-05-04	Multiversum, Schwechat (Austria)	
24	Win	11-12-2	Dora Farkas			2013-01-27	PRO-GYM Sportcenter, 1210 Wien, Vienna (Austria)	
23	Win	10-12-2	Erika Nemeth			2012-11-25	PRO-GYM Sportcenter, 1210 Wien, Vienna (Austria)	
22	Draw	9-12-2	Claudia Ferenczi			2012-08-19	Pristav pri Kompe, Šturovo (Slovakia)	
21	Loss	9-12-1	Gaelle Amand			2012-06-29	Salle Marcel Cerdan, Poissy (France)	
20	Loss	9-11-1	Ina Menzer			2012-04-21	Sport and Congress Center, Schwerin (Germany)	
19	Loss	9-10-1	Elina Tissen			2012-03-24	Stadtwerke Arena Münster, Münster (Germany)	GBC, GBUF World, WIBF World featherweight title
18	Win	9-8-1	Anamarija Maras			2011-11-15	Stadthalle, Vienna (Austria)	
17	Loss	8-8-1	Goda Dailydaite			2011-04-02	Julius Halle, Dorsten (Germany)	
16	Win	7-8-1	Carola Steenjes			2010-10-19	Pyramide, Voesendorf (Austria)	
15	Win	6-8-1	Agnese Boza			2010-06-05	ASKÖ Sportcenter, Graz (Austria)	
14	Loss	5-8-1	Nadya Hokmi			2010-03-19	Salle des sports, Metz (France)	
13	Win	5-7-1	Ancuta Suvac			2010-03-06	Wimberger Hotel, Vienna (Austria)	
12	Win	4-7-1	Pia Mazelanik			2009-11-14	Stadthalle, Steyr (Austria)	
11	Loss	3-7-1	Arleta Krausova			2009-06-05	Pyramida Hotel, Prague (Czechoslovakia)	
10	Loss	3-6-1	Dahiana Santana			2009-01-24	Trotyl Bar and Lounge, Petionville (Haiti)	interim Global Boxing Union Female World bantamweight title
9	Loss	3-5-1	Pia Mazelanik			2008-10-11	Dorsten (Germany)	
8	Loss	3-4-1	Magdalena Dahlen			2008-06-15	Tabor Arena, Maribor (Slovenia)	
7	Loss	3-3-1	Hagar Finer			2008-03-01	Aviv Sport Hall, Ra'anana (Israel)	
6	Loss	3-2-1	Hagar Finer			2008-02-09	Rheinstetten (Germany)	
5	Win	3-1-1	Simona Pencakova			2007-11-24	Stadthalle, Steyr (Austria)	
4	Win	2-1-1	Petra Buchberger			2007-09-15	Frankie's BF Arena, Oberpullendorf (Austria)	
3	Loss	1-1-1	Nadia Raoui			2007-09-02	Universal Hall, Mitte (Germany)	
2	Draw	1-1	Kira Schnuerer			2007-01-07	Daimler Benz, Karlsruhe (Germany)	
1	Win	1-0	Isabell Hoher			2007-01-07	Knielingen (Germany)	
