= Maureen Shea =

American boxer

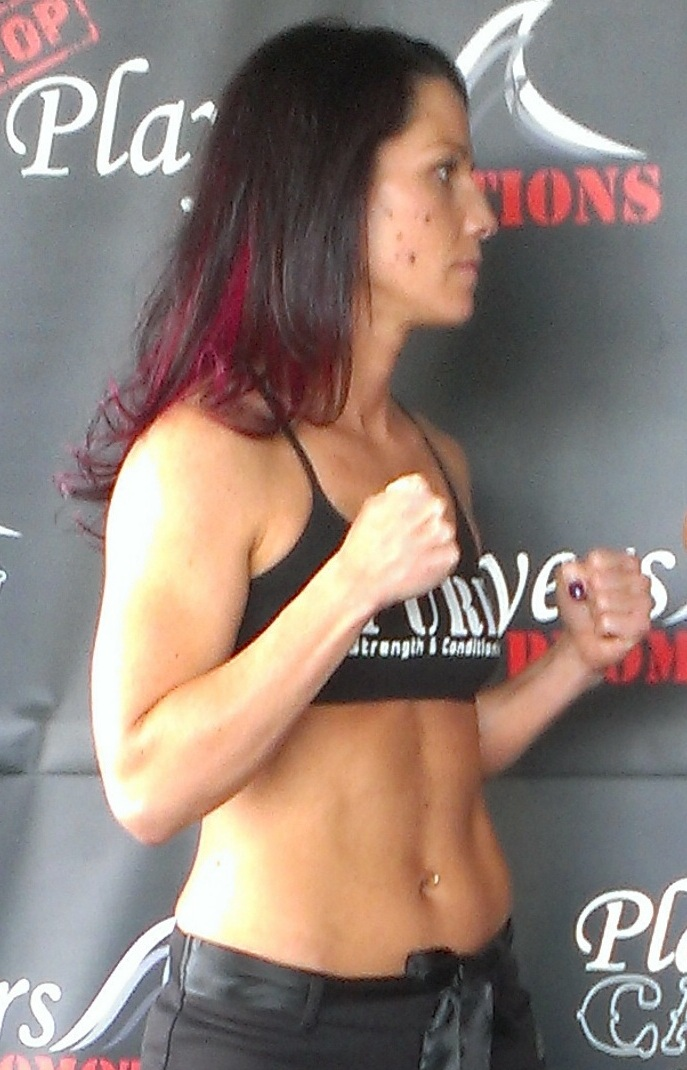
- Maureen Shea, 2014

Personal information
- Nicknames: Moe; The Real Million Dollar Baby
- Born: Maureen Anne Shea Carranza; January 11, 1981 (age 45) The Bronx, New York, U.S.
- Height: 5 ft 4 in (163 cm)
- Weight: Super bantamweight; Featherweight; Super featherweight

Boxing career
- Reach: 64 in (163 cm)
- Stance: Orthodox

Boxing record
- Total fights: 36
- Wins: 31
- Win by KO: 13
- Losses: 3
- Draws: 1
- No contests: 1

Maureen Anne Shea Carranza (born January 11, 1981) is an American professional boxer. She held the WBC interim female featherweight title in 2011 and the IFBA super bantamweight title from 2014 to 2015, and challenged once for the WBA female super featherweight title in 2009. She is known as the "Real Million Dollar Baby" because of her work as the main sparring partner for Hilary Swank in her preparation for the 2004 movie, Million Dollar Baby.

== Early life ==
Maureen was born and raised in the Bronx, New York. Born in 1981, she was raised by a strict Irish father, a now retired NYPD detective. Maureen's mother, of Mexican heritage, worked in the airline industry, allowing Maureen to frequently travel. Moe spent much of her youth growing up in the Bronx and in the Guadalajara, Mexico. In the amateurs, Maureen was known and respected for her boxing. First training out of NYBG with Luigi Olcese, she was eventually brought to Gleasons to train with well respected trainer Hector Roca. It was a gradual process in Shea's growth and preparation for the game of professional boxing.

In 2004, when Hilary Swank came looking for Hector Roca to help her get ready for the movie Million Dollar Baby, Roca paired Swank with Maureen Shea. Maureen was Hilary's main sparring partner in preparation for Swank's award-winning role in the movie. When the international media found out that Swank attended all of Maureen's amateur bouts, Maureen was thrust into the spotlight. It was Maureen's boxing, however, that captured the attention.

Her nicknames include "The Bronx Bombshell", "The Real Million Dollar Baby", and "Moe".

== Professional career ==
Maureen Shea of the Bronx, New York, is the former IFBA Jr Featherweight World Champion, former NABF Festherweight Champion, former NABA Featherweight Champion and former Interim WBC Featherweight Champion. Shea is one of the top professional female boxers in the world.

=== WBA Super Featherweight Championship ===
In February 2009, Maureen lost her first world title attempt to Kina Malpartida. This bout was held at the Madison Square Garden in New York, New York.

=== Interim WBC Featherweight Championship ===
On December 12, 2011 Shea beat Colombian Diana Ayala to win the Interim WBC Featherweight Champion. This bout was held at the Estadio Centenario in Los Mochis, Sinaloa, Mexico.

=== NABA Featherweight Champion ===
On March 15, 2014 Shea beat Nohime Dennison of Albuquerque New Mexico as the Main Event on Top Players Promotions Ice Vs Fire 2 in Oxnard California to win the vacant NABA featherweight title

=== IFBA Jr Featherweight World Title ===
On July 11, 2014 Shea tko'd Angel Gladney of South Carolina to win the IFBA Jr Featherweight World Title. Fighting for the second time as the Main Event on Top Players Promotions Ice vs Fire 3, this was a historical fight being the FIRST ever World Title Fight in Ventura County.

Maureen defended her IFBA world title as the co-feature to the Shane Mosely Vs Ricardo Mayorga main event on August 29, 2015 on Pay-Per-View versus Yulihan Luna of Mexico. This bout resulted in a draw and was the first time a female fight was featured on Pay-Per-View in over a decade.

Maureen has fought as a professional at Madison Square Garden three times, under such distinguished promoters such as Top Rank, Star Boxing, and was the first female to fight on Lou Dibella's Broadway Boxing series. Her fights have been televised on Pay Per View, Azteca Television, Telemundo, Madison Square Garden Network, and SNY.

== Professional boxing record ==
36 fights	31 wins	3 losses
By knockout	13	2
By decision	18	1
Draws	1	
No contests	1	

No.	Result	Record	Opponent	Type	Round, time	Date	Location	Notes
36	Loss	31–3–1 (1)	Perla Lomeli	SD	6 (6)	2024-08-23	Hard Rock Live, Hollywood, Florida, U.S.	
35	Win	31–2–1 (1)	Beáta Dudek	UD	8 (8)	2024-08-10	Polar Park, Worcester, Massachusetts, U.S.	
34	Win	30–2–1 (1)	Calista Silgado	UD	8 (8)	2022-05-07	Carnesecca Arena, Queens, New York, U.S.	
33	Win	29–2–1 (1)	Martina Horgasz	TKO	6 (8)	2020-01-17	Gulfstream Park, Hallandale Beach, Florida, U.S.	
32	Win	28–2–1 (1)	Edina Kiss	UD	6 (6)	2019-10-18	Seneca Casino & Hotel, Niagara Falls, New York, U.S.	
31	Win	27–2–1 (1)	Dayanna González	UD	6 (6)	2019-04-12	Grand Hotel Tijuana, Tijuana, Mexico	
30	Win	26–2–1 (1)	Nazly Maldonado	MD	4 (4)	2017-11-04	Gasmart Stadium, Tijuana, Mexico	
29	Win	25–2–1 (1)	Zenny Sotomayor	UD	8 (8)	2015-12-18	Gimnasio de Mexicali, Mexicali, Mexico	
28	Draw	24–2–1 (1)	Yulihan Luna	SD	10 (10)	29 Aug 2015	Forum, Inglewood, California, U.S.	Retained IFBA super-bantamweight; For IBF super-bantamweight title
27	Win	24–2 (1)	Angel Gladney	TKO	4 (10)	2014-07-11	Performing Arts Center, Oxnard, California, U.S.	Won vacant IFBA super-bantamweight title
26	Win	23–2 (1)	Nohime Dennisson	UD	10 (10)	2014-03-15	Performing Arts Center, Oxnard, California, U.S.	Won vacant NABA featherweight title
25	Win	22–2 (1)	Lesly Morales	UD	6 (6)	2013-10-23	Salon Las Pulgas, Tijuana, Mexico	
24	Win	21–2 (1)	Silvia Jimenez	UD	4 (4)	2013-07-13	Forum Tecate, Tijuana, Mexico	
23	Win	20–2 (1)	Alma Lizeth de la Cruz Rivas	UD	6 (6)	2013-05-24	Caliente Hipódromo, Tijuana, Mexico	
22	Win	19–2 (1)	Silvia Zuniga	UD	4 (4)	2013-05-01	Salon Las Pulgas, Tijuana, Mexico	
21	Win	18–2 (1)	Diana Ayala	MD	10 (10)	2011-12-10	Estadio Centenario, Los Mochis, Mexico	Won Interim WBC featherweight title
20	Win	17–2 (1)	Silvia Ramirez	TKO	5 (6)	2011-10-29	Palenque de la Feria, Colima, Mexico	
19	Win	16–2 (1)	Yara Cabanas	TKO	2 (6)	2011-10-08	Los Cabos Municipality, Mexico	
18	Win	15–2 (1)	Liliana Martinez	TKO	3 (6)	2010-07-30	Performing Arts Center, Saratoga Springs, New York, U.S.	Won vacant NABF featherweight title
17	Win	14–2 (1)	Norma Faris	TKO	3 (6)	2010-05-14	Paradise Theater, The Bronx, New York, U.S.	
16	Loss	13–2 (1)	Lindsay Garbatt	TKO	7 (8)	2009-08-01	Mohegan Sun Arena, Uncasville, Connecticut, U.S.	
15	Loss	13–1 (1)	Kina Malpartida	TKO	10 (10)	Feb 21, 2009	Madison Square Garden, New York City, New York, U.S.	For WBA super-featherweight title
14	Win	13–0 (1)	Ellsha Cleffman	TKO	1 (6)	2008-09-10	PAL Gym, Yonkers, New York, U.S.	
13	Win	12–0 (1)	Jessica Mohs	TKO	2 (6)	2007-09-05	Cipriani Wall Street, New York City, New York, U.S.	
12	Win	11–0 (1)	Olivia Gerula	UD	6 (6)	2007-07-06	Eldorado Resort Casino, Reno, Nevada, U.S.	
11	Win	10–0 (1)	Eva Lidia Silva	TKO	3 (6)	2007-03-16	Madison Square Garden, New York City, New York, U.S.	
10	Win	9–0 (1)	Elizabeth Moreno	UD	6 (6)	2007-01-25	Paradise Theater, The Bronx, New York, U.S.	
9	Win	8–0 (1)	Rocio Vazquez	TKO	3 (6)	2006-12-14	Hammerstein Ballroom, New York City, New York, U.S.	
8	Win	7–0 (1)	Tammy Franks	UD	6 (6)	2006-11-10	Alamodome, San Antonio, Texas, U.S.	
7	Win	6–0 (1)	Olga Heron	UD	6 (6)	2006-07-20	Hammerstein Ballroom, New York City, New York, U.S.	
6	NC	5–0 (1)	Kim Colbert	NC	6 (6)	2006-05-19	Manhattan Center, New York City, New York, U.S.	Originally a split decision win for Colbert, changed to a No Contest after Colbert tested positive for marijuana in a post fight drug test
5	Win	5–0	LeAnne Villareal	UD	4 (4)	2006-03-16	Madison Square Garden, New York City, New York, U.S.	
4	Win	4–0	Sarina Hayden	TKO	3 (6)	2006-02-10	Iona College, New Rochelle, New York, U.S.	
3	Win	3–0	Darnella Barnes	UD	4 (4)	2005-10-08	The Venue, Greensboro, North Carolina, U.S.	
2	Win	2–0	Katherine Applewhite	TKO	1 (4)	2005-09-17	The Venue, Greensboro, North Carolina, U.S.	
1	Win	1–0	Camille Casson	TKO	1 (4)	2005-08-26	Westchester County Center, White Plains, New York, U.S.	

== Personal life ==
She has overcome many obstacles, including being the victim of abuse, to achieve her current success. Of Irish and Mexican descent, Maureen has a large fan base of both ethnicities and is a crowd favorite. She currently lives in Oxnard, California and trains at The Boxing Laboratory, home of Vasyl Lomenchenko.

=== Million Dollar Baby ===
She was recognized for her work as Hilary Swank's main sparring partner for her award-winning role in "Million Dollar Baby".

In 2008, Maureen was nominated by MTV as one of their "2008 Toughest Coaches", for her role in their hour long season opening episode of "Made". In that show, Maureen guided a young lady who had no boxing experience; and in six weeks, prepared her for her first competitive amateur bout with a decision win. Later that year she was also nominated by PETA for their Sexiest Vegetarian award.

Maureen has successfully translated her ring experience to ringside, having worked as a boxing analyst alongside highly respected commentators Al Bernstein, and Rich Marotta, on Top Rank "Latin Fury" PPV. She has also guest commentated on the MSG Network during the 2006 NY Golden Gloves, and currently hosts her own live TV show, "Shea's Corner" on Bronx Net Television. Shea has done work as President of Pandora Promotions, Motivational/Inspirational speaker, journalist, TV/radio personality, and Boxing Commentator.

=== Team Shea ===
- Advisor: Luigi Olcese
- Head Trainer: Derik Santos
- Cutman: Danny Milano/Carlos Vargas
- Strength/conditioning: Phil Daru - Asst. Jose Rojas

== See also ==
- List of female boxers

Sporting positions
Regional boxing titles
Vacant Title last held by Jennifer Barber	NABF featherweight champion July 30, 2010 – 2011; Vacated	Vacant Title next held by Amanda Serrano
New title	NABA featherweight champion March 15, 2014 – 2014; Vacated	Vacant
Minor world boxing titles
Vacant Title last held by Kaliesha West	IFBA super-bantamweight champion July 11, 2014 – 2015; Vacated	Vacant
Major world boxing titles
New title	WBC featherweight champion Interim title December 10, 2011 – 2012; Vacated	Vacant Title next held by Amanda Serrano
