= Melissa Hernández =

Puerto Rican boxer (born 1980)

Personal information
- Nicknames: Huracán Shark; The Shark
- Born: Melissa Hernández Pacheco; February 4, 1980 (age 46) Mayagüez, Puerto Rico
- Height: 5 ft 2 in (157 cm)
- Weight: Super bantamweight; Featherweight; Super featherweight; Lightweight; Light welterweight

Boxing career
- Reach: 64 in (163 cm)
- Stance: Orthodox

Boxing record
- Total fights: 35
- Wins: 23
- Win by KO: 7
- Losses: 9
- Draws: 3

Melissa Hernández Pacheco (born February 4, 1980) is a Puerto Rican professional boxer. She held the WBC female featherweight title from 2012 to 2013 and challenged once for the WBC female lightweight title in 2011. She is a member of the International Women's Boxing Hall of Fame.

== Amateur career ==
She took up boxing to lose weight when she tipped the scales at 160 pounds (73 kg; 11 st 6 lb). She was invited to a gym by her best friend's brother, a two-time Golden Gloves champion. Melissa trained at the gym for a while, but dropped out. However, two months later she walked into a Webster PAL gym, where she decided to take another shot at boxing training.

By the time the 2003 New York Golden Gloves came around, Melissa had reduced her weight to 145 lb (66 kg; 10 st 5 lb), and she signed up to fight at 138 lb (63 kg; 9 st 12 lb). In her first amateur fight, she faced Golden Glove champion Jill Emery and lost.

She then met former world champion Ada Vélez, who invited Belinda Laracuente to watch Melissa fight at the 2003 Women's U.S. Championships in Fort Lauderdale, Florida. Not long after that, Velez and Laracuente moved Melissa from New York City to Florida to train with them. She says of that time:

"I lived with them for a while and learned how to box and not just fight. It seemed that a little of the 'Brown Sugar' rubbed off on me and I began to have a little of her style in me. I stayed with Belinda as my head trainer for almost a year, fighting any fights I could get. By the time the 2004 Golden Gloves rolled around I had changed my style to a mix between boxer-brawler. My trainer Pablo knew I had a better shot and I had dropped my weight down to 130 lbs. With hard training and dedication I went on to win the 2004 Golden Gloves."

At the 2004 National PAL Boxing Championships in Virginia Beach, Virginia, Melissa won the 132-lb division. She also won the 2005 Golden Gloves. She then went on to win the 2005 Florida PAL Championship over Lena Taylor.

== Professional career ==
Melissa made her pro boxing debut at the Hilton in New York City on October 26, 2005, notching a four-round majority decision over previously unbeaten Mao Mao Zhang of China, also a former amateur champion. Hernández dictated the pace of the fight with her jab. She executed her game plan well by using excellent footwork, head and body movement, as well as feinting, but she did manage to walk into the line of fire a few times and was hit with a couple of solid left hooks as she tried to get inside. Overall, her boxing skills were too much for Zhang, whose pro record fell to 1–1 with the loss.

On January 21, 2006, at the White Rock Boxing Gym in Columbia, South Carolina, Melissa stopped Jennifer Johnson of Camden, South Carolina at 0:17 in the first round, dropping Johnson to 0–2.

On April 29, 2006, at the Silver Reef Casino in Ferndale, Washington, Melissa scored a four-round unanimous (40-36 x 3) decision over 19-year-old pro debuter Merced Nunez of Philomoth, Oregon. The difference in this bout was experience. Hernández, though she only has two professional fights, had sixteen amateur bouts. Nunez had only two amateur bouts. Nonetheless, the fight was action packed. Though Nunez stood taller, she had some trouble making contact with the elusive Hernández.

On June 15, 2006, at the Seven Feathers Hotel and Casino in Canyonville, Oregon, Melissa faced veteran Kelsey Jeffries over 10 rounds for the IFBA featherweight title, fighting her to a split draw (95-93 Jeffries, 96-94 Hernández, 95-95). Jeffries was now 33-9-1 (2 KO's) while Hernández was just 3-0-1 (1 KO) as a pro. This was an impressive step-up in competition for Hernández.

On June 30, 2006, at Club Europe in Atlanta, Georgia, Melissa won a six-round unanimous (60-54 x 3) decision over Leora Jackson of Springdale, Arkansas who fell to 2–8. On August 31, 2006, at Harvey's Lake Tahoe in Stateline, Nevada, Melissa TKO'd pro debuter Stacey Rogers of New London, Ohio at 0:42 in the third round of a scheduled four rounder.

On September 14, 2012, at the Shaw Conference Centre in Edmonton, Alberta, Melissa won a ten-round unanimous decision over Jelena Mrdjenovich to win the WBC featherweight title. She would lose the title in a rematch with Jelena in her next fight.

In April 2019 she beat rising contender, Selina Barrios via unanimous decision.

Her final world title shot came against Chantelle Cameron for the WBC light-welterweight title, she would lose via fifth round stoppage.

In October 2025, she was named among the inductees for the 2026 International Women's Boxing Hall of Fame class.

== Professional boxing record ==
35 fights	23 wins	9 losses
By knockout	7	2
By decision	16	7
Draws	3	

No.	Result	Record	Opponent	Type	Round, time	Date	Location	Notes
35	Loss	23–9–3	Carla Torres	UD	6 (6)	2023-07-29	John T. Rhodes Sports Center, Myrtle Beach, South Carolina, U.S.	
34	Loss	23–8–3	Chantelle Cameron	TKO	5 (10)	2021-05-29	Michelob Ultra Arena, Paradise, Nevada, U.S.	For WBC light-welterweight title
33	Win	23–7–3	Selina Barrios	UD	8 (8)	2019-04-27	Cajundome, Lafayette, Louisiana, U.S.	
32	Loss	22–7–3	Layla McCarter	UD	8 (8)	2016-07-16	Legacy Arena, Birmingham, Alabama, U.S.	
31	Win	22–6–3	Gina Chamie	TKO	1 (8)	2015-10-08	Radisson Grand Ballroom, Rochester, New York, U.S.	
30	Win	21–6–3	Loli Munoz	UD	10 (10)	2015-06-12	Amazura Concert Hall, Queens, New York, U.S.	Won vacant UBF light-welterweight title
29	Win	20–6–3	Ashleigh Curry	UD	8 (8)	2015-04-18	Main Street Armory, Rochester, New York, U.S.	
28	Loss	19–6–3	Layla McCarter	UD	8 (8)	2014-11-21	The Orleans, Paradise, Nevada, U.S.	
27	Win	19–5–3	Nicole Woods	MD	8 (8)	2014-03-01	North Atlanta Trade Center, Norcross, Georgia, U.S.	
26	Loss	18–5–3	Marcela Acuña	UD	10 (10)	2013-07-13	Club Defensores de Villa Lujan, San Miguel de Tucumán, Argentina	
25	Loss	18–4–3	Jelena Mrdjenovich	TD	6 (10)	2013-05-31	Shaw Conference Centre, Edmonton, Canada	Lost WBC featherweight champion
24	Win	18–3–3	Jelena Mrdjenovich	UD	10 (10)	2012-09-14	Shaw Conference Centre, Edmonton, Canada	Won WBC featherweight champion
23	Win	17–3–3	Nicole Woods	UD	10 (10)	2012-07-28	Columbus Civic Center, Columbus, Georgia, U.S.	
22	Loss	16–3–3	Érica Farías	UD	10 (10)	2011-12-16	Arena Maipú, Maipú, Mendoza, Argentina	For WBC lightweight title
21	Win	16–2–3	Christina Tai	TKO	4 (6)	2011-09-24	Grand Star Receptions, Altona North, Australia	
20	Win	15–2–3	Jelena Mrdjenovich	SD	8 (8)	2011-06-24	Shaw Conference Centre, Edmonton, Canada	
19	Win	14–2–3	David Morrison	TKO	4 (6)	2011-01-20	Convention Center, Charlotte, North Carolina, U.S.	
18	Draw	13–2–3	Lindsay Garbatt	MD	10 (10)	2010-10-16	Santa Ana Star Casino Hotel, Bernalillo, New Mexico, U.S.	Retained WIBA super-featherweight title; For vacant GBU super-featherweight title
17	Win	13–2–2	Victoria Cisneros	UD	8 (8)	2010-08-14	Santa Ana Star Casino Hotel, Bernalillo, New Mexico, U.S.	
16	Loss	12–2–2	Lindsay Garbatt	MD	8 (8)	2010-06-05	National Guard Armory, Evansville, Indiana, U.S.	
15	Win	12–1–2	Ela Nunez	UD	6 (6)	2010-02-19	Tri-State Sport Complex, Aston Township, Pennsylvania, U.S.	
14	Win	11–1–2	Ambar Fajardo	TKO	5 (8)	2009-07-21	Atlapa Convention Centre, Panama City, Panama	
13	Win	10–1–2	Jeri Sitzes	UD	6 (6)	2009-05-09	The Joint, Paradise, Nevada, U.S.	
12	Win	9–1–2	Ela Nunez	UD	10 (10)	2008-09-05	Buffalo Bill's Star Arena, Primm, Nevada, U.S.	Won vacant WIBA super-featherweight title
11	Win	8–1–2	Melissa Fiorentino	TKO	3 (8)	2008-06-07	Mohegan Sun Arena, Uncasville, Connecticut, U.S.	
10	Draw	7–1–2	Chevelle Hallback	SD	10 (10)	2008-02-07	Pechanga Resort & Casino, Temecula, California, U.S.	For vacant IFBA lightweight title
9	Win	7–1–1	Layla McCarter	MD	8 (8)	2007-04-27	The Orleans, Paradise, Nevada, U.S.	Won GBU lightweight title
8	Loss	6–1–1	Layla McCarter	RTD	8 (12)	2007-02-14	The Orleans, Paradise, Nevada, U.S.	For GBU lightweight title
7	Win	6–0–1	Lisa Brown	UD	10 (10)	2006-11-04	Shaw Conference Centre, Edmonton, Canada	Won vacant WIBA super-bantamweight title
6	Win	5–0–1	Stacey Rogers	TKO	3 (4)	2006-08-31	Harveys Lake Tahoe, Stateline, Nevada, U.S.	
5	Win	4–0–1	Leora Jackson	UD	6 (6)	2006-06-30	Club Europe, Atlanta, Georgia, U.S.	
4	Draw	3–0–1	Kelsey Jeffries	SD	10 (10)	2006-06-15	Seven Feathers Casino Resort, Canyonville, Oregon, U.S.	For IFBA featherweight title
3	Win	3–0	Merced Nunez	UD	4 (4)	2006-04-29	Silver Reef Casino Resort, Ferndale, Washington, U.S.	
2	Win	2–0	Jennifer Johnson	TKO	1 (4)	2006-01-21	White Rock Gym, Columbia, South Carolina, U.S.	
1	Win	1–0	Zhang Mao Mao	UD	4 (4)	2005-10-26	Hilton Hotel, New York City, New York, U.S.	

== See also ==
- List of female boxers

Sporting positions
Minor world boxing titles
Vacant Title last held by Jeannine Garside	WIBA super-bantamweight champion November 4, 2006 – 2007; Vacated	Vacant Title next held by Lisa Brown
Preceded by Layla McCarter	GBU lightweight champion April 27, 2007 – 2007; Vacated	Vacant Title next held by Layla McCarter
Vacant Title last held by Chevelle Hallback	WIBA super-featherweight champion September 5, 2008 – 2010; Vacated	Vacant Title next held by Lindsay Garbatt
Vacant Title last held by Rola El-Halabi	UBF light-welterweight champion June 12, 2015 – 2015; Vacated	Vacant Title next held by Alicia Melina
Major world boxing titles
Preceded by Jelena Mrdjenovich	WBC featherweight champion September 14, 2012 – May 31, 2013	Succeeded by Jelena Mrdjenovich
