= Jessica Rakoczy =

Canadian boxer and mixed martial artist (born 1977)

- Born: April 14, 1977 (age 49); Hamilton, Ontario, Canada
- Other names: Ragin
- Height: 5 ft 7 in (170 cm)
- Weight: 115 lb (52 kg; 8 st 3 lb)
- Division: Lightweight; Super bantamweight (boxing); Bantamweight; Flyweight; Strawweight (MMA)
- Reach: 68 in (170 cm)
- Style: Boxing
- Stance: Orthodox
- Fighting out of: Hamilton, Ontario, Canada
- Team: Xtreme Couture
- Trainer: Dewey Cooper
- Rank: Blue belt in Brazilian Jiu-Jitsu; Master of sports in boxing
- Years active: 2000–2009, 2012–2013 (Boxing); 2009–2015 (MMA)

Professional boxing record
- Total: 37
- Wins: 33
- By knockout: 12
- Losses: 3
- By knockout: 1
- No contests: 1

Mixed martial arts record
- Total: 7
- Wins: 1
- By knockout: 1
- Losses: 5
- By knockout: 2
- By submission: 1
- By decision: 2
- No contests: 1

Other information
- Website: jessieboxing.com
- Boxing record from BoxRec
- Mixed martial arts record from Sherdog
- Last updated on: 13 Nov 2011

Jessica Rakoczy (born April 14, 1977) is a Canadian former professional boxer and mixed martial artist and seven-time women's lightweight boxing champion of the world.

== Boxing career ==
Rakoczy made her professional boxing debut in October 2000. She has earned a record of 33 wins against 3 losses, with one no contest.

She is as a three-time WIBA World Champion and two-time former WBC Lightweight Champion. Most recently, she won the vacant WIBA Women's International Boxing Association super bantamweight title with a win against Ada Vélez on January 24, 2013.

Rakoczy was inducted into the International Women's Boxing Hall of Fame in 2018.

== Mixed martial arts career ==
=== Early career ===
Rakoczy made her professional MMA debut in October 2009. In five fights, she amassed a record of 1 win, 3 losses and one no contest.

=== The Ultimate Fighter ===
In August 2013, it was announced that Rakoczy was one of the fighters selected to be on The Ultimate Fighter: Team Rousey vs. Team Tate.

Rakoczy faced Revelina Berto in the elimination fight to get into the house. Despite both women being boxers, the majority of the fight was contested on the ground, where Rakoczy won via an armbar submission in the second round.

During her first tournament fight in the house, Rakoczy faced veteran Roxanne Modafferi. After losing the first round with it mostly being contested on the ground and struggling for takedowns, Rakoczy landed multiple punches on the feet in the second round. After several heavy blows landed and a slam against Modafferi's armbar attempt Rakoczy won via TKO.

In the semifinals, Rakoczy faced Raquel Pennington and won the fight via unanimous decision after three rounds.

=== Ultimate Fighting Championship ===
Rakoczy faced Julianna Peña in the finals on November 30, 2013, at The Ultimate Fighter 18 Finale. She lost the bout via TKO in the final seconds of the first round.

Rakoczy made her return to the UFC Octagon on April 25, 2015, in her strawweight debut against Valérie Létourneau at UFC 186 in Montreal, Quebec on April 25, 2015. She lost the fight via unanimous decision and was subsequently released from the UFC.

== Championships and accomplishments ==
=== Boxing ===
- International Boxing Association

- IBA Women's Lightweight Championship (1 time)

- North American Boxing Association

- NABA Women's Lightweight Championship (1 time)

- North American Boxing Federation

- NABF Female Lightweight Championship (1 time)

- Women's International Boxing Association

- WIBA Intercontinental Lightweight Championship (1 time)

- World Boxing Council

- WBC Female World Lightweight Championship (2 times)

=== Mixed martial arts ===
- Ultimate Fighting Championship
  - The Ultimate Fighter 18 Tournament Runner-Up
  - The Ultimate Fighter 18 Knockout of the Season

== Mixed martial arts record ==
Professional record breakdown
7 matches	1 win	5 losses
By knockout	1	2
By submission	0	1
By decision	0	2
No contests	1	

Res.	Record	Opponent	Method	Event	Date	Round	Time	Location	Notes
Loss	1–5 (1)	Valérie Létourneau	Decision (unanimous)	UFC 186	April 25, 2015	3	5:00	Montreal, Quebec, Canada	Strawweight debut.
Loss	1–4 (1)	Julianna Peña	TKO (punches and elbows)	The Ultimate Fighter 18 Finale	November 30, 2013	1	4:59	Las Vegas, Nevada, United States	The Ultimate Fighter: Team Rousey vs. Team Tate women's Bantamweight tournament final.
Win	1–3 (1)	Kristen Gatz	KO (punches)	Tachi Palace Fights 14	September 7, 2012	1	2:19	Lemoore, California, United States	
NC	0–3 (1)	Jennifer Scott	No Contest (overturned)	Millennium Events	October 9, 2010	2	5:00	Las Vegas, Nevada, United States	Initially Rakoczy won via TKO; overturned as Rakoczy tested positive for banned substance.
Loss	0–3	Felice Herrig	Decision (split)	Bellator 14	April 15, 2010	3	5:00	Chicago, Illinois, United States	
Loss	0–2	Zoila Frausto	Submission (armbar)	TPF 3: Champions Collide	February 4, 2010	2	1:17	Lemoore, California, United States	
Loss	0–1	Michelle Ould	TKO (punches)	TPF 1: Tachi Palace Fights 1	October 8, 2009	2	1:40	Lemoore, California, United States	

=== Mixed martial arts exhibition record ===
Exhibition record breakdown		
3 matches	3 wins	0 losses
By knockout	1	0
By submission	1	0
By decision	1	0

Res.	Record	Opponent	Method	Event	Date	Round	Time	Location	Notes
Win	3–0	Raquel Pennington	Decision (unanimous)	The Ultimate Fighter: Team Rousey vs. Team Tate	November 27, 2013 (air date)	3	5:00	Las Vegas, Nevada, United States	TUF 18 semi-final
Win	2–0	Roxanne Modafferi	TKO (slam & punches)	The Ultimate Fighter: Team Rousey vs. Team Tate	September 25, 2013 (air date)	2	2:31	Las Vegas, Nevada, United States	TUF 18 preliminary round
Win	1–0	Revelina Berto	Submission (omoplata)	The Ultimate Fighter: Team Rousey vs. Team Tate	September 4, 2013 (air date)	2	2:31	Las Vegas, Nevada, United States	TUF 18 elimination round

== Professional boxing record ==
37 fights	33 wins	3 losses
By knockout	12	1
By decision	21	2
No contests	1	

No.	Result	Record	Opponent	Type	Round, time	Date	Location	Notes
37	Win	33–3 (1)	Ada Vélez	UD	10 (10)	2013-01-24	Coca-Cola Center, Oklahoma City, Oklahoma, U.S.	Won vacant WIBA super-bantamweight title
36	Win	32–3 (1)	Brittany Cruz	TKO	4 (8)	2012-05-04	The Joint, Paradise, Nevada, U.S.	
35	Win	31–3 (1)	Jessica Mohs	TKO	3 (6)	2009-07-16	Tachi Palace, Lemoore, California, U.S.	
34	Win	30–3 (1)	Belinda Laracuente	UD	6 (6)	2009-04-23	Tachi Palace, Lemoore, California, U.S.	
33	Win	29–3 (1)	Cindy Serrano	UD	8 (8)	2008-04-17	Tachi Palace, Lemoore, California, U.S.	
32	Win	28–3 (1)	Belinda Laracuente	UD	10 (10)	2008-02-29	Tachi Palace, Lemoore, California, U.S.	Won vacant NABF lightweight title
31	Loss	27–3 (1)	Ann Saccurato	KO	10 (10)	2007-09-27	Tachi Palace, Lemoore, California, U.S.	Lost WBC lightweight title
30	Win	27–2 (1)	Terri Blair	UD	8 (8)	2007-05-17	Tachi Palace, Lemoore, California, U.S.	
29	Win	26–2 (1)	Kelli Cofer	TD	5 (10)	2007-02-22	Tachi Palace, Lemoore, California, U.S.	Won vacant WBC lightweight title
28	Win	25–2 (1)	Jessica Mohs	TKO	2 (6)	2007-01-05	DeSoto Civic Center, Southaven, Mississippi, U.S.	
27	Win	24–2 (1)	Tawnyah Freeman	TKO	1 (8)	2006-12-14	Tachi Palace, Lemoore, California, U.S.	Won vacant NABF lightweight title
26	NC	23–2 (1)	Belinda Laracuente	NC	3 (6)	Sep 2, 2006	Staples Center, Los Angeles, California, U.S.	Fight stopped after Rakoczy was cut from an accidental head-butt
25	Win	23–2	Angel McNamara	TKO	5 (6)	2006-04-12	Tachi Palace, Lemoore, California, U.S.	
24	Win	22–2	Terri Blair	UD	8 (8)	2006-02-23	Tachi Palace, Lemoore, California, U.S.	
23	Win	21–2	Angel McNamara	UD	6 (6)	2005-12-02	Tachi Palace, Lemoore, California, U.S.	
22	Loss	20–2	Eliza Olson	UD	10 (10)	2005-09-16	Tachi Palace, Lemoore, California, U.S.	Lost WBC and IBA lightweight titles
21	Win	20–1	Jane Couch	TKO	6 (10)	2005-07-21	Tachi Palace, Lemoore, California, U.S.	Retained IBA lightweight title; Won inaugural WBC lightweight title
20	Win	19–1	Belinda Laracuente	UD	10 (10)	2005-04-01	Tachi Palace, Lemoore, California, U.S.	Retained IBA lightweight title
19	Win	18–1	Mia St. John	RTD	2 (6)	2005-02-10	Tachi Palace, Lemoore, California, U.S.	
18	Win	17–1	Dana Kendrick	TKO	1 (8)	2004-12-16	Tachi Palace, Lemoore, California, U.S.	
17	Win	16–1	Olivia Gerula	UD	8 (8)	2004-07-01	Tachi Palace, Lemoore, California, U.S.	
16	Win	15–1	Gloria Ramirez	UD	8 (8)	2004-05-22	Warnors Theatre, Fresno, California, U.S.	
15	Win	14–1	Mia St. John	UD	8 (8)	2004-04-15	Tachi Palace, Lemoore, California, U.S.	
14	Win	13–1	Lisa Lewis	UD	10 (10)	2004-02-19	Tachi Palace, Lemoore, California, U.S.	Won vacant IBA lightweight title
13	Loss	12–1	Jenifer Alcorn	SD	10 (10)	2003-01-17	Tachi Palace, Lemoore, California, U.S.	For vacant IWBF lightweight title
12	Win	12–0	Cheryl Nance	TKO	4 (6)	2002-11-22	Tachi Palace, Lemoore, California, U.S.	
11	Win	11–0	Gail Muzzey	TKO	1 (6)	2002-07-09	Playboy Mansion, Los Angeles, California, U.S.	
10	Win	10–0	Gloria Ramirez	UD	6 (6)	2002-04-30	Santa Ana Star Casino Hotel, Bernalillo, New Mexico, U.S.	
9	Win	9–0	Layla McCarter	UD	6 (6)	2002-02-17	Stardust Resort and Casino, Winchester, Nevada, U.S.	
8	Win	8–0	Michelle Linden	UD	6 (6)	2001-11-09	Spa Resort Casino, Palm Springs, California, U.S.	
7	Win	7–0	Mikee Stafford	UD	6 (6)	2001-08-18	Cox Pavilion, Paradise, Nevada, U.S.	
6	Win	6–0	Imelda Arias	UD	4 (4)	2001-07-08	Texas Station, North Las Vegas, Nevada, U.S.	
5	Win	5–0	Vicky Clardy	UD	6 (6)	2001-05-20	Belterra Casino Resort & Spa, Florence, Indiana, U.S.	
4	Win	4–0	Mikee Stafford	UD	6 (6)	2001-04-01	The Joint, Paradise, Nevada, U.S.	
3	Win	3–0	Mary Wells	UD	4 (4)	2001-01-21	Sunset Station, San Antonio, Texas, U.S.	
2	Win	2–0	Josephine Bracamontes	TKO	1 (4)	2000-12-03	Miccosukee Resort & Gaming, Miami, Florida, U.S.	
1	Win	1–0	Chris Sepulvado	TKO	2 (4)	2000-10-21	Silver Star Casino, Philadelphia, Mississippi, U.S.	

== See also ==
- List of female boxers
- List of female mixed martial artists
- List of Canadian UFC fighters
- List of doping cases in sport

Sporting positions
Regional boxing titles
New title	NABF lightweight champion December 14, 2006 – February 22, 2007; Won world title	Vacant Title next held by Herself
Vacant Title last held by Herself	NABF lightweight champion February 29, 2008 – January 24, 2013; Won WIBA title	Vacant Title next held by Selina Barrios
Minor world boxing titles
Vacant Title last held by Sumya Anani	IBA lightweight champion February 19, 2004 – September 16, 2005	Succeeded by Eliza Olson
Vacant Title last held by Lisa Brown	WIBA super-bantamweight champion January 24, 2013 – 2013; Retired	Vacant Title next held by Shannon O'Connell
Major world boxing titles
Inaugural champion	WBC lightweight champion July 21, 2005 – September 16, 2005	Succeeded by Eliza Olson
Vacant Title last held by Ann Saccurato	WBC lightweight champion February 22, 2007 – September 27, 2007	Succeeded by Ann Saccurato
