= Phil Daru =

American mixed martial artist and football player

- Born: November 20, 1988 (age 37)
- Other names: Bam Bam
- Nationality: American
- Height: 5 ft 8 in (1.73 m)
- Weight: 151 lb (68.49 kg)
- Division: Lightweight
- Rank: Brown belt in Kenpo
- Years active: 2011–2013

Mixed martial arts record
- Total: 4
- Wins: 1
- By knockout: 0
- By submission: 0
- By decision: 1
- Losses: 3
- By submission: 2
- By decision: 1

Phil Daru (born November 20, 1988) is an American former mixed martial artist and college football player. Daru is noted for training UFC fighters, boxers, Olympic athletes, and NFL football players. He was named Best Strength and Conditioning Coach in the State of Florida, 2012/13 and also won the World MMA Awards Trainer of the Year in 2019-20 and 2021.

== Early life ==
Daru was born in Broward County, Florida. He began training in kenpo karate at four years old. At eight years old, he began playing football. By the age of 12, he started weight training for football. He went on to play Division 1 college football as a strong safety and special teams gunner at Alabama State University.

After his sophomore year of college, Daru began training in MMA under his first coach, Din Thomas at an affiliate of the American Top Team gym. During his own training, Daru learned under trainers such as Tony Montgomery. Daru also went on to earn two degrees in Sports Medicine and Exercise Science from Alabama State University.

== Career ==
Daru competed in several amateur MMA fights before turning pro in 2009, at age 21. He had his first fight against Kurt Holobaugh under the XFC organization. He went on to have one more fight for the XFC before having two fights under the sReal Fighting Championships (RFC) promotion.

While still fighting professionally, Daru opened his own gym at 22 years old. He moved on to full-time coaching after retiring from MMA in 2014.

In 2014, Daru began working at American Top Team as a strength and conditioning coach after his retirement from fighting. Daru stepped down from his position at American Top Team in 2020.

Daru owns multiple performance centers, including some opened together with exercise physiologist and former US Marine Jose Rojas

Daru and Rojas has also developed strength and conditioning methods for professional athletes and coaches.

== Personal life ==
Daru is married to Mirella Daru.

== Selected list of trainees ==
- Kyoji Horiguchi, (current) Rizin Bantamweight champion, (former) Bellator Bantamweight Championship, (former) Shooto Bantamweight Champion/MMA
- Dustin Poirier, (former) Interim UFC Lightweight Champion/ MMA
- Joanna Jędrzejczyk, (former) UFC Women's Strawweight Champion/ MMA
- Junior dos Santos, (former) UFC Heavyweight Champion/MMA
- Colby Covington, (former) Interim UFC Welterweight Champion/MMA
- Tyron Woodley, (former) UFC Welterweight Champion/MMA.
- Muhammed Lawal, (former) Strikeforce Light Heavyweight Champion and Rizin Heavyweight Grand Prix Champion/MMA and Wrestler
- Will Brooks, (former) Bellator MMA Lightweight World Champion/MMA
- Edson Barboza, MMA
- Sullivan Barrera, Cuban professional boxer.
- Maureen Shea, professional boxer
- Alessio Sakara, MMA
- Angelica Delgado, Judoka, Olympian.
- Jordan Young
- Kayla Harrison, Judoka, Olympian.
- Andrei Arlovski, MMA, Former UFC heavyweight champion
- Jay Crawford, NFL defensive tackle.
- Tecia Torres, MMA

== See also ==
- List of current UFC fighters
- List of male mixed martial artists
