= Eliza Olson =

American boxer (born 1976)

Personal information
- Born: Eliza Jane Olson; February 8, 1976 (age 50) Downey, California, U.S.
- Height: 5 ft 6 in (168 cm)
- Weight: Lightweight; Light welterweight; Light middleweight

Boxing career
- Stance: Orthodox

Boxing record
- Total fights: 19
- Wins: 10
- Win by KO: 2
- Losses: 6
- Draws: 3

Eliza Jane Olson (born February 8, 1976) is an American retired professional boxer. A former WBC female lightweight champion, she is a member of the International Women's Boxing Hall of Fame.

== Professional career ==
A professional since 2000, Olson defeated Jessica Rakoczy on 17 September 2005 to win the vacant WBC female lightweight title. Her final fight was a unanimous decision loss on 7 October 2016 against Maricela Cornejo. Olson was inducted into the International Women's Boxing Hall of Fame in 2022.

== Professional boxing record ==
19 fights	10 wins	6 losses
By knockout	2	0
By decision	8	6
Draws	3	

No.	Result	Record	Opponent	Type	Round, time	Date	Location	Notes
19	Loss	10–6–3	Maricela Cornejo	UD	6 (6)	2016-10-07	Belasco Theater, Los Angeles, California, U.S.	
18	Win	10–5–3	Miriam Brakache	UD	6 (6)	2006-07-20	HP Pavilion, San Jose, California, U.S.	
17	Win	9–5–3	Jessica Rakoczy	UD	10 (10)	2005-09-16	Tachi Palace, Lemoore, California, U.S.	Won WBC and IBA lightweight titles
16	Loss	8–5–3	Mary Jo Sanders	UD	10 (10)	2005-07-30	Cobo Arena, Detroit, Michigan, U.S.	For inaugural WBC light-welterweight title
15	Draw	8–4–3	Jaime Clampitt	SD	10 (10)	2004-12-10	Foxwoods Resort Casino, Ledyard, Connecticut, U.S.	For vacant IWBF light-welterweight title
14	Loss	8–4–2	Myriam Lamare	UD	10 (10)	2004-11-08	Palais Omnisport de Paris-Bercy, Paris, France	For inaugural WBA light-welterweight title
13	Win	8–3–2	Rita Turrisi	UD	6 (6)	2004-07-23	Warnors Theatre, Fresno, California, U.S.	
12	Loss	7–3–2	Agnieszka Rylik	UD	10 (10)	2004-04-10	M.E.N. Arena, Manchester, England	For vacant IBO and WIBF light-welterweight titles
11	Draw	7–2–2	Deborah Fettkether	MD	10 (10)	2004-02-07	Grand Casino Coushatta, Kinder, Louisiana, U.S.	For vacant IBA light-middleweight title
10	Win	7–2–1	Lisa Holewyne	UD	6 (6)	2003-11-08	Seven Feathers Casino Resort, Canyonville, Oregon, U.S.	
9	Loss	6–2–1	Jaime Clampitt	UD	10 (10)	2003-10-31	Convention Center, Providence, Rhode Island, U.S.	For vacant IWBF light-welterweight title
8	Draw	6–1–1	Ann Saccurato	PTS	4 (4)	2003-03-19	Villa Barone Manor, The Bronx, New York, U.S.	
7	Win	6–1	Valanna McGee	UD	4 (4)	2002-07-19	Feather Falls Casino, Oroville, California, U.S.	
6	Win	5–1	Reyna Soriano	UD	4 (4)	2001-12-19	Feather Falls Casino, Oroville, California, U.S.	
5	Win	4–1	Robyn Covino	TKO	1 (4)	2001-09-07	Radisson Hotel, Sacramento, California, U.S.	
4	Loss	3–1	Gloria Ramirez	UD	4 (4)	2001-01-19	ARCO Arena, Sacramento, California, U.S.	
3	Win	3–0	Kelly Whaley	UD	4 (4)	2000-05-19	Pechanga Resort & Casino, Temecula, California, U.S.	
2	Win	2–0	Michelle Vidales	TKO	3 (4)	2000-04-15	Mandalay Bay Events Center, Paradise, Nevada, U.S.	
1	Win	1–0	Debbie Foster	SD	4 (4)	2000-03-03	Feather Falls Casino, Oroville, California, U.S.	

== Personal life ==
Eliza is the granddaughter of former middleweight champion, Bobo Olson.

== See also ==
- List of female boxers
- Notable boxing families

Sporting positions
Minor world boxing titles
Preceded by Jessica Rakoczy	IBA lightweight champion September 16, 2005 – 2006; Vacated	Vacant Title next held by Sofya Ochigava
Major world boxing titles
Preceded by Jessica Rakoczy	WBC lightweight champion September 16, 2005 – 2006; Vacated	Vacant Title next held by Ann Saccurato
