= Ann Saccurato =

American boxer

Personal information
- Born: Ann Marie Saccurato; January 1, 1978 (age 48) Thornwood, New York, U.S.
- Height: 5 ft 6 1/2 in (169 cm)
- Weight: Lightweight; Light welterweight; Welterweight

Boxing career
- Stance: Orthodox

Boxing record
- Total fights: 23
- Wins: 15
- Win by KO: 6
- Losses: 6
- Draws: 2

Ann Marie Saccurato (born January 1, 1978) is an American former professional boxer.

== Professional career ==
Saccurato turned professional in 2002 & compiled a record of 12–1–2 before beating Jelena Mrdjenovich to win the vacant WBC lightweight title. She would go on to have two further reigns of the same title before losing it in her final fight against rising contender Érica Farías.

== Professional boxing record ==
23 fights	15 wins	6 losses
By knockout	6	1
By decision	9	5
Draws	2	

No.	Result	Record	Opponent	Type	Round, time	Date	Location	Notes
23	Loss	15–6–2	Érica Farías	TD	8 (10)	2011-08-06	Estadio Socios Fundadores, Comodoro Rivadavia, Argentina	Lost WBC lightweight title
22	Loss	15–5–2	Holly Holm	TKO	8 (10)	2010-12-03	Route 66 Casino, Albuquerque, New Mexico, U.S.	For IBA light-welterweight title
21	Win	15–4–2	Jelena Mrdjenovich	UD	10 (10)	2009-11-13	Shaw Conference Centre, Edmonton, Alberta, Canada	Retained WBC lightweight title
20	Loss	14–4–2	Myriam Lamare	UD	10 (10)	2009-10-09	Salle Vallier, Marseille, France	For inaugural WBF light-welterweight title
19	Win	14–3–2	Emiko Raika	UD	10 (10)	2008-08-11	Korakuen Hall, Tokyo, Japan	Won vacant WBC lightweight title
18	Loss	13–3–2	Emiko Raika	MD	10 (10)	2007-11-10	Shinjuku Face, Tokyo, Japan	For WIBA lightweight title
17	Win	13–2–2	Jessica Rakoczy	KO	10 (10)	2007-09-27	Tachi Palace, Lemoore, California, U.S.	Won WBC lightweight title
16	Loss	12–2–2	Holly Holm	UD	10 (10)	2007-03-22	Isleta Casino & Resort, Albuquerque, New Mexico, U.S.	For vacant WBC, WIBA and IFBA welterweight titles
15	Win	12–1–2	Jelena Mrdjenovich	SD	10 (10)	2006-11-04	Shaw Conference Centre, Edmonton, Alberta, Canada	Won vacant WBC lightweight title
14	Win	11–1–2	Victoria Cisneros	UD	8 (8)	2006-02-10	Iona College, New Rochelle, New York, U.S.	
13	Win	10–1–2	Tonya Gallegos	TKO	1 (6)	2005-11-23	Westchester County Center, White Plains, New York, U.S.	
12	Loss	9–1–2	Belinda Laracuente	SD	6 (6)	2005-08-26	Westchester County Center, White Plains, New York, U.S.	
11	Win	9–0–2	Martha Deitchman	TKO	4 (8)	2005-05-06	Westchester County Center, White Plains, New York, U.S.	
10	Win	8–0–2	Victoria Cisneros	UD	6 (6)	2005-02-04	Westchester County Center, White Plains, New York, U.S.	
9	Win	7–0–2	Cimberly Harris	UD	6 (6)	2004-10-30	Orange County Fairgrounds, Middletown, New York, U.S.	
8	Draw	6–0–2	Maria Lindberg	PTS	4 (4)	2004-05-30	DC Tunnel, Washington, D.C., U.S.	
7	Win	6–0–1	Elizabeth Mooney	UD	4 (4)	2004-03-19	Olympic Theater, New York City, New York, U.S.	
6	Win	5–0–1	Bonnie Wherry	TKO	2 (4)	2003-11-01	Greensboro, North Carolina, U.S.	
5	Win	4–0–1	Bonnie Mann	UD	4 (4)	2003-09-06	Coliseum, Greensboro, North Carolina, U.S.	
4	Draw	3–0–1	Eliza Olson	PTS	4 (4)	2003-03-19	Villa Barone Manor, The Bronx, New York, U.S.	
3	Win	3–0	Daria Hill	MD	4 (4)	2002-12-11	Hudson Theatre, New York City, New York, U.S.	
2	Win	2–0	Myriam Bazile	TKO	1 (4)	2002-07-23	New Roc City, New Rochelle, New York, U.S.	
1	Win	1–0	Ann Marie Francey	TKO	2 (4)	2002-05-24	Wonderland Ballroom, Revere, Massachusetts, U.S.	

== Personal life ==
Prior to turning professional, Saccurato enrolled at Seton Hall University to study health and physical fitness but left after one year to pursue her career in the fitness industry.

== See also ==
- List of female boxers

Sporting positions
World boxing titles
Vacant Title last held by Eliza Olson	WBC lightweight champion November 4, 2006 – 2007; Vacated	Vacant Title next held by Jessica Rakoczy
Preceded by Jessica Rakoczy	WBC lightweight champion September 27, 2007 – 2008; Vacated	Vacant Title next held by Herself
Vacant Title last held by Herself	WBC lightweight champion August 11, 2008 – August 6, 2011	Succeeded by Érica Farías
