= Kina Malpartida =

Peruvian boxer (born 1980)

Kina Malpartida Dyson
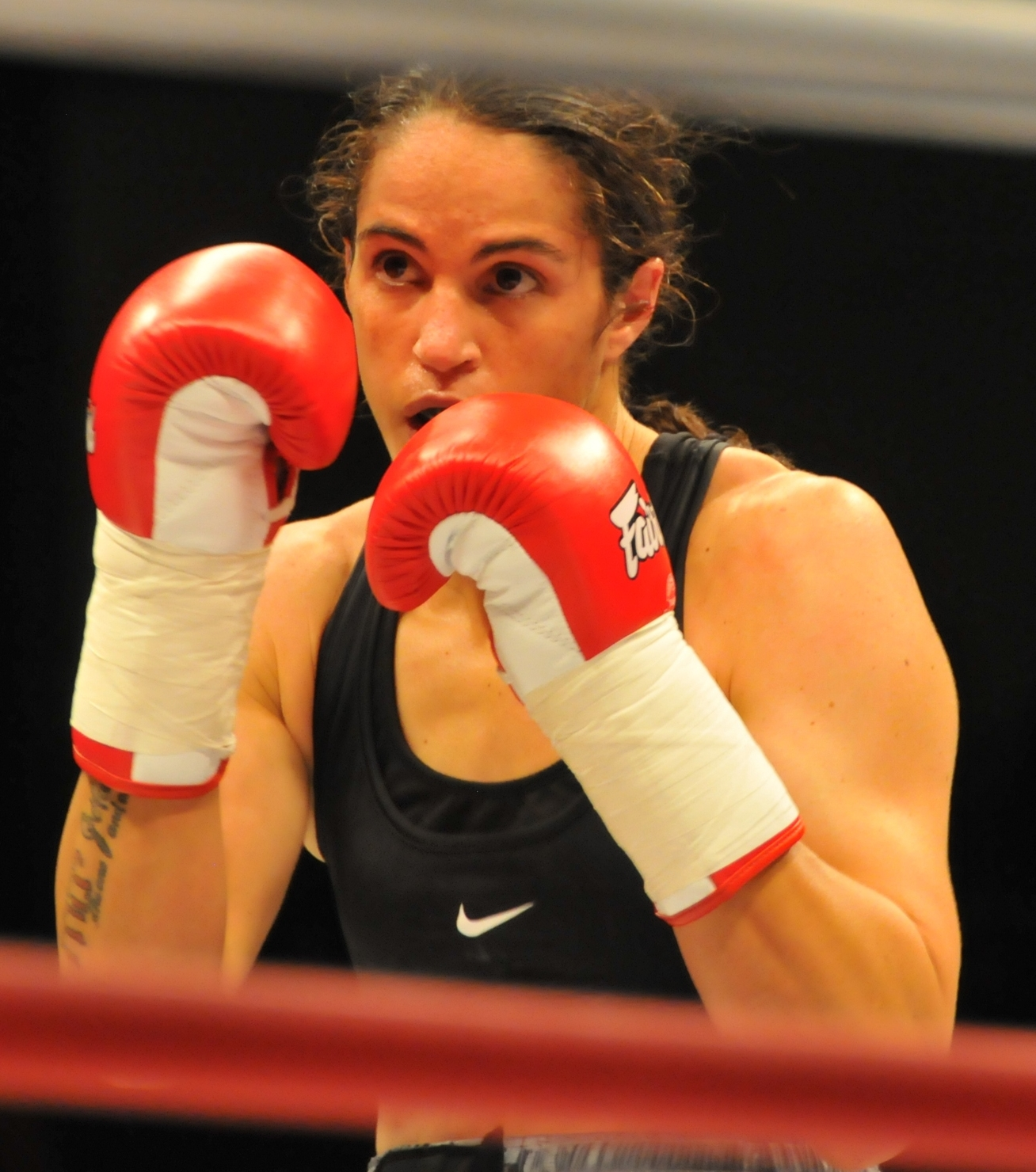

Personal information
- Nickname: Dynamite
- Born: Kina Malpartida Dyson; March 25, 1980 (age 46) Lima, Peru
- Height: 165 cm (5 ft 5 in)
- Weight: Super Featherweight

Boxing career
- Stance: Orthodox

Boxing record
- Total fights: 17
- Wins: 14
- Win by KO: 4
- Losses: 3
- Draws: 0
- No contests: 0

Kina Malpartida Dyson (born March 25, 1980) is a Peruvian female professional boxer and National Surfing Champion. She held the World Boxing Association World Title in the Super Featherweight class from February 21, 2009, until October 30, 2013. Malpartida is a member of the International Women's Boxing Hall of Fame.

== Personal life and Surfing Champion ==
Malpartida was born in Lima, Peru in 1980 to model Susy Dyson and Peruvian National Surfing Champion Oscar Malpartida.

Inclined to sports from a very young age, Kina started practicing Karate Do when she was six. Besides Karate, she also played competitive soccer, basketball, tennis, and track and field. Kina has surfed since she was 10. In 1996 Kina became the Peruvian Surfing Champion in the Women's Open World Surfing Championship, defeating future ASP surf world champion Sofia Mulanovich.

In 1995 Kina won first place in two surf tournaments in the Men's Jr. category.

In 1996 and in 2007, Kina competed in two World Tournaments organized by the International Surfing Association (ISA) in Huntington Beach, California. She ranked in the top ten in both cases. In 1999, Kina moved to Australia and obtained a Bachelor's Business Degree in Restaurant and Catering Management from Griffith University, Queensland.

She also completed a one-year course of Commercial Cookery at the TAFE Institute in New South Wales, Australia.

Currently romantically involved with male model Gregach "Optihammer" Toth.

== Support staff ==
Kina used to be trained by Mario Morales in the Azteca Boxing Club, in Bell, California. She also trained in Club Waikiki while in Peru under Luis Rivas.

== Boxing career ==
In May 2003, Kina started training as a boxer under the guidance of the Coach Tony Simms, in the city of Currumbin in the Gold Coast, Australia, with the intention of becoming a World Champion professional boxer. In August 2003, in Australia, Kina had her first professional fight against Katrina Harding, Kina won by unanimous decision. In November 2003, in Australia, Kina had her second professional fight against Sharon Bishoff winning by K.O. at the first minute of the second round. Kina continued fighting and winning three more professional fights in Australia. In November 2006, due to the difficulty of finding new opponents in Australia, Kina moved to Los Angeles, California to pursue her professional boxing career in the USA. On February 21, 2009, Kina had her 12th professional fight at the Madison Square Garden in New York against Maureen Shea (13-0-0) in which Kina won the World Boxing Association (WBA) World Championship Title of the Super Featherweight at 130 pounds. In June 2009, Kina defended successfully her title in Lima, Peru, stopping Halana Dos Santos, from Brazil (11-1-0), with a TKO at the 7th round. Once again, on the fifth of December, she successfully defended her title against the British boxer Lindsey Scragg in the Citizens Business Bank Arena of Los Ángeles winning by unanimous decision.

Malpartida was inducted into the International Women's Boxing Hall of Fame in 2025.

Date	LB	Opponent	LB	W-L-D	Location	Result/Round
2012-05-19	129	Sriphrae Nongkipahuyuth	128	---	Coliseo Miguel Grau del Callao, Lima, Peru	W by TKO/4
2011-04-16	129	Rhonda Luna	130	---	Estadio Monumental, Lima, Peru	W by UD/10
2010-06-26	128	Liliana Palmera	128	---	Jockey Plaza, Lima, Peru	W by UD/10
2009-12-05	129	Lindsay Scragg	130	---	Citizen Business Bank, California, USA	W by UD/10
2009-06-20	130	Halana Dos Santos	129	11-1-0	Coliseo Dibos, Lima, Peru	W by TKO/7 10x2
21 Feb 2009	128	Maureen Shea	128	13-0-0	Madison Square Garden NY, United States	W by TKO/10 10x2
2008-11-20	129	Rhonda Luna	129	12-1-1	San Manuel Casino, Highland CA, United States	L by Split Decision
2007-11-29	126	Ela Nuñez	126	4-2-0	Marriott Hotel, Irvine CA, United States	L TKO/5 5x2
2007-09-27	127	Elizabeth Moreno	128	4-3-2	Marriott Hotel, Irvine CA, United States	W UD/4 4x2
2007-07-19	128	Crystal Morales	132	6-6-1	Marriott Hotel, Irvine CA, United States	W UD/4 4x2
2006-04-20	134	Miriam Nakamoto	138	1-0-0	Marriott Hotel, Irvine CA, United States	L UD/4 4x2
2006-02-23	134	Lisa Martin	134	2-3-0	Marriott Hotel, Irvine CA, United States	W UD/4 4x2
2005-02-11	138	Mirelle Walford	140	0-0-0	Broncos Leagues Club, Queensland, Australia	W UD/4 4x2
2004-04-23	127	Holly Ferrnely	129	1-4-1	Southport RSL Queensland, Australia	W UD/6 6x2
2004-04-03	128	Leona Nicholls	126	0-1-0	Shire Hall, Gatton, Queensland, Australia	W UD/3 3x2
2003-11-28	133	Sharon Bischoff	135	0-0-0	Southport RSL, Queensland, Australia	W TKO/2 3x2
2003-08-22	139	Katrina Harding	140	0-0-0	Southport RSL, Queensland, Australia	W UD/3 3x2

== Family life and community activities ==
Kina's younger brother Alvaro Malpartida, is also a competitive surfer who has been the Peruvian National Surfing Champion four times and he is currently starting to compete in international surfing events. Currently on the Internet there are many fan clubs of Kina. The number of fans in Facebook alone, in South America exceeds one hundred seventy thousand and growing. Kina has managed to develop an enormous following -with a sold-out event on her first defense of the WBAWorld Champion title.

The leadership of Kina winning and defending successfully her WBA Championship Belt, has caused her to become a role model for women and children in South America. In July 2009 the powerful Latin Business Association (LBA), during their Annual Sol Awards Ceremony at the Century Biltmore Hotel awarded Kina the Chairman's Global Leadership Award due to her outstanding role as a leader at a global level and as a role model for women and children.

On June 7, 2012, Kina was involved in a criminal incident in Lima when she was pulled over by a police patrol after she was leaving a nightclub called "El Dragon" in the district of Barranco. It was later determined that Malpartida had twice the amount of alcohol level permitted by Peruvian Law while operating a motor vehicle. She was subsequently charged by the D.A. office with a driving under the influence offense for which her driver's license was suspended for 12 months. After entering a guilty plea, she was also forced to pay a fine of 1.800 Nuevos Soles (around 600 U.S. dollars) and do community service hours.
