= Miguel Cotto vs. Michael Jennings =

Boxing match

- Date: February 21, 2009
- Venue: Madison Square Garden, New York, New York, U.S.
- Title(s) on the line: vacant WBO welterweight title

Tale of the tape
Boxer	Miguel Cotto	Michael Jennings
Nickname	Junito	The Lurcher
Hometown	Caguas, Puerto Rico	Chorley, Lancashire, UK
Purse	$1,000,000	$150,000
Pre-fight record	32–1 (26 KO)	34–1 (16 KO)
Age	28 years, 3 months	31 years, 5 months
Height	5 ft 8 in (173 cm)	5 ft 9 1/2 in (177 cm)
Weight	146 lb (66 kg)	146 1/2 lb (66 kg)
Style	Orthodox	Orthodox
Recognition	WBO; No. 1 Ranked Welterweight; The Ring; No. 2 Ranked Welterweight	WBO; No. 2 Ranked Welterweight

Result
- Cotto wins via 5th-round technical knockout

Miguel Cotto vs. Michael Jennings was a professional boxing match contested on February 21, 2009, for the WBO welterweight title.

== Background ==
After it was announced in November 2008 that the reigning WBO welterweight champion Paul Williams would be moving up in weight to challenge Verno Phillips for their interim light middleweight title, the organization forced Williams to vacate the welterweight title as WBO rules did not allow a fighter to hold titles in separate weight classes. The WBO then hoped to decide their next welterweight champion by having their two top-ranked contenders Miguel Cotto and Michael Jennings face one another the following February.

After months of negotiations, a deal was reached in late November that would see the Cotto and Jennings headline a HBO pay-per-view on February 21, 2009, at a yet-to-be-announced venue. Though Atlantic City's Boardwalk Hall had been rumored to be the venue in which the event would take place, it was announced in January that Cotto's favored Madison Square Garden would be the location of the pay-per-view.

The Cotto–Jennings fight was paired with a WBC and WBO middleweight title fight between champion Kelly Pavlik and challenger Marco Antonio Rubio as part of a dual-site pay-per-view doubleheader promoted by Top Rank and aired on HBO PPV. The Pavlik–Rubio fight took place at the Chevrolet Centre in Pavlik's native Youngstown, Ohio. Those who attended the respective fights live would be able to see the fight from the other host city as each would be broadcast in the other arena.

== Fight Details ==
After a relatively uneventful first round in which nothing substantial was landed though Cotto was the far busier fighter, Cotto dominated the overmatched Jennings thereafter as he continuously pressed the action forcing Jennings to move away and try to clinch whenever Cotto got in close. Jennings had trouble landing any sustained offense as he only managed to land 30 punches compared to Cotto, who landed 118. By the fourth round, Cotto had bloodied Jennings nose and scored two knockdowns in the final minute of the round, both coming from Cotto trapping Jennings in the corner of the ring and sending him down with multiple-punch combinations. Jennings was able to get up and continue the fight both times as he narrowly survived the round as Cotto was hammering him again in the corner as the rounded ended. Jennings was able to survive most of round five, but Cotto again trapped him in the corner and sent him down with a combination, though Jennings again rose to his feet, the fight was stopped as Jennings was clearly too dazed to continue. Cotto would earn the technical knockout victory at 2:36 of the fifth round.

== Fight card ==
Confirmed bouts:

Weight Class	Weight		vs.		Method	Round	Notes
Welterweight	147 lbs.	Miguel Cotto	def.	Michael Jennings	TKO	5/12	^{note 1}
Middleweight	160 lbs.	John Duddy	def.	Matt Vanda	UD	10
Super Featherweight	130 lbs.	Kina Malpartida	def.	Maureen Shea	TKO	10/10x2	^{note 2}
Middleweight	160 lbs.	Paweł Wolak	def.	Norberto Bravo	TKO	3/8
Super Bantamweight	122 lbs.	Jorge Diaz	def.	Lante Addy	UD	6
Middleweight	160 lbs.	Matt Korobov	def.	Cory Jones	TKO	4/4
Heavyweight	200+ lbs.	Lenroy Thomas	def.	Terrell Nelson	UD	4

^Note 1 For vacant WBO Welterweight Title
^Note 2 For Vacant WBA Female Super Featherweight Title

== Broadcasting ==
Country	Broadcaster
Ireland & United Kingdom	Setanta Sports
United States	HBO

Preceded by vs. Antonio Margarito	Miguel Cotto's bouts 21 February 2009	Succeeded by vs. Joshua Clottey
Preceded by vs. Jason Rushton	Michael Jennings 's bouts 21 February 2009	Succeeded by vs. Willie Thompson
