= Olivia Gerula =

Canadian boxer (born 1979)

Personal information
- Nickname: The Predator
- Born: Olivia Alyssis Pereira Gerula; May 1, 1979 (age 47) Toronto, Ontario, Canada
- Height: 5 ft 5 in (165 cm)
- Weight: Featherweight; Super featherweight

Boxing career
- Reach: 66 in (168 cm)
- Stance: Orthodox

Boxing record
- Total fights: 43
- Wins: 19
- Win by KO: 3
- Losses: 21
- Draws: 3

Olivia Alyssis Pereira Gerula (born May 1, 1979) is a Canadian professional boxer.

== Professional career ==
Gerula turned professional in 1997 and compiled a record of 10–10–2 before beating Jelena Mrdjenovich to win the WBC super-featherweight title. She would defend the title twice before losing it to rising Swedish contender Frida Wallberg. After losing a rematch with Frida, Gerula would rematch Jelena Mrdjenovich for the lesser known WIBA title, she would lose via ninth-round knockout.

== Professional boxing record ==
43 fights	19 wins	21 losses
By knockout	3	3
By decision	16	18
Draws	3	

No.	Result	Record	Opponent	Type	Round, time	Date	Location	Notes
43	Loss	19–21–3	Mary Casamassa	UD	10 (10)	2024-03-30	Steamfitters 449 Union Hall, Harmony, Pennsylvania, U.S.	For vacant WIBA super-middleweight title
42	Loss	19–20–3	Olivia Curry	UD	8 (8)	2023-04-08	Donald Stephens Center, Rosemont, Illinois, U.S.	
41	Win	19–19–3	Logan Holler	UD	4 (4)	2022-09-17	Chase Fieldhouse, Wilmington, Delaware, U.S.	
40	Draw	18–19–3	Jaime Clampitt	UD	6 (6)	2021-06-19	Cranston Stadium, Cranston, Rhode Island, U.S.	
39	Loss	18–19–2	Melissa St. Vil	UD	8 (8)	2021-05-14	Embassy Suites Nashville SE, Murfreesboro, Tennessee, U.S.	
38	Loss	18–18–2	Elena Gradinar	UD	10 (10)	2018-03-24	Narva Ice Hall, Narva, Estonia	For vacant IBF Inter-Continental featherweight title
37	Loss	18–17–2	Jennifer Han	UD	10 (10)	2017-02-17	Don Haskins Center, El Paso, Texas, U.S.	For IBF featherweight title
36	Win	18–16–2	Nydia Feliciano	SD	8 (8)	2016-10-20	Mayflower Hotel, Washington, D.C., U.S.	
35	Loss	17–16–2	Amanda Serrano	TKO	1 (10)	2016-02-17	BB King Blues Club & Grill, New York City, New York, U.S.	For vacant WBO featherweight title
34	Win	17–15–2	Lucia Larcinese	UD	6 (6)	2016-01-21	Montreal Casino, Montreal, Quebec, Canada	
33	Loss	16–15–2	Carla Torres	UD	10 (10)	2015-10-22	Club Regent Casino, Winnipeg, Manitoba, Canada	
32	Win	16–14–2	Simone Aparecida da Silva	MD	10 (10)	2015-04-30	Club Regent Casino, Winnipeg, Manitoba, Canada	
31	Win	15–14–2	Kaliesha West	UD	8 (8)	2014-08-15	Crowne Plaza Hotel, Gatineau, Quebec, Canada	
30	Win	14–14–2	Jaime Ward	UD	6 (6)	2013-10-12	Convention Centre, Winnipeg, Manitoba, Canada	
29	Loss	13–14–2	Ronica Jeffrey	UD	10 (10)	2013-05-24	Westchester County Center, White Plains, New York, U.S.	For vacant IWBF super-featherweight title
28	Loss	13–13–2	Jelena Mrdjenovich	KO	9 (10)	2011-12-09	Shaw Conference Centre, Edmonton, Alberta, Canada	For vacant WIBA featherweight title
27	Loss	13–12–2	Frida Wallberg	UD	10 (10)	2011-09-03	Karlstad CCC, Karlstad, Sweden	For WBC super-featherweight title
26	Loss	13–11–2	Frida Wallberg	UD	8 (8)	2010-11-27	Johanneshov, Stockholm, Sweden	Lost WBC super-featherweight title
25	Win	13–10–2	Brooke Dierdorff	UD	10 (10)	2010-07-08	Convention Centre, Winnipeg, Manitoba, Canada	Retained WBC super-featherweight title
24	Win	12–10–2	Myriam Chomaz	MD	10 (10)	2009-12-17	Halle Georges Carpentier, Paris, France	Retained WBC super-featherweight title
23	Win	11–10–2	Jelena Mrdjenovich	UD	10 (10)	2009-04-09	Shaw Conference Centre, Edmonton, Alberta, Canada	Won WBC super-featherweight title
22	Win	10–10–2	Emiko Raika	SD	8 (8)	2009-03-03	Korakuen Hall, Tokyo, Japan	
21	Win	9–10–2	Monique Duval	TKO	4 (6)	2008-10-24	Convention Centre, Winnipeg, Manitoba, Canada	
20	Loss	8–10–2	Sandy Tsagouris	MD	8 (8)	2007-10-13	Powerade Centre, Brampton, Ontario, Canada	For vacant Canadian super-featherweight title
19	Win	8–9–2	Sosadea Razo	UD	4 (4)	2007-08-24	The Orleans, Paradise, Nevada, U.S.	
18	Loss	7–9–2	Maureen Shea	UD	6 (6)	2007-07-06	Eldorado Resort Casino, Reno, Nevada, U.S.	
17	Win	7–8–2	Olga Heron	UD	6 (6)	2007-01-26	Convention Centre, Winnipeg, Manitoba, Canada	
16	Win	6–8–2	Amanda Carriere	TKO	3 (4)	2006-09-23	Convention Centre, Winnipeg, Manitoba, Canada	
15	Loss	5–8–2	Jelena Mrdjenovich	KO	4 (6)	2004-09-24	Convention Centre, Winnipeg, Manitoba, Canada	
14	Loss	5–7–2	Jessica Rakoczy	UD	8 (8)	2004-07-01	Tachi Palace, Lemoore, California, U.S.	
13	Win	5–6–2	Elizabeth Anderson	UD	6 (6)	2004-03-26	Fort Cheyenne Casino, North Las Vegas, Nevada, U.S.	
12	Draw	4–6–2	Mia St. John	MD	6 (6)	2003-09-19	4 Bears Casino & Lodge, New Town, North Dakota, U.S.	
11	Win	4–6–1	Laramie Hinostroza	KO	1 (4)	2002-08-10	Emerald Queen Casino, Tacoma, Washington, U.S.	
10	Loss	3–6–1	Dakota Stone	UD	4 (4)	2001-04-07	Coeur d'Alene Casino, Worley, Idaho, U.S.	
9	Loss	3–5–1	Melissa Del Valle	UD	8 (8)	1999-06-12	Shriners Auditorium, Wilmington, Massachusetts, U.S.	
8	Loss	3–4–1	Kathy Collins	UD	8 (8)	1999-04-17	Tropicana Casino & Resort, Atlantic City, New Jersey, U.S.	
7	Loss	3–3–1	Fredia Gibbs	UD	6 (6)	1998-09-17	Grand Casino, Biloxi, Mississippi, U.S.	
6	Loss	3–2–1	Kathy Collins	UD	10 (10)	1998-07-31	Tropicana Casino & Resort, Atlantic City, New Jersey, U.S.	
5	Win	3–1–1	Cathy Boyes	SD	5 (5)	1998-05-08	Capri Centre, Red Deer, Alberta, Canada	
4	Draw	2–1–1	Diana Dutra	PTS	4 (4)	1998-03-27	Tacoma Dome, Tacoma, Washington, U.S.	
3	Win	2–1	Ragan Pudwill	UD	4 (4)	1998-01-24	Hotel Bismarck, Bismarck, North Dakota, U.S.	
2	Loss	1–1	Sarah Schmedling	UD	4 (4)	1997-10-14	Bank of America Center, Boise, Idaho, U.S.	
1	Win	1–0	Christina Berry	PTS	4 (4)	1997-10-04	Rochester, Minnesota, U.S.	

== See also ==
- List of female boxers

Sporting positions
World boxing titles
Preceded by Jelena Mrdjenovich	WBC super-featherweight champion April 9, 2009 – November 27, 2010	Succeeded by Frida Wallberg
