= Jelena Mrdjenovich =

Canadian boxer (born 1982)

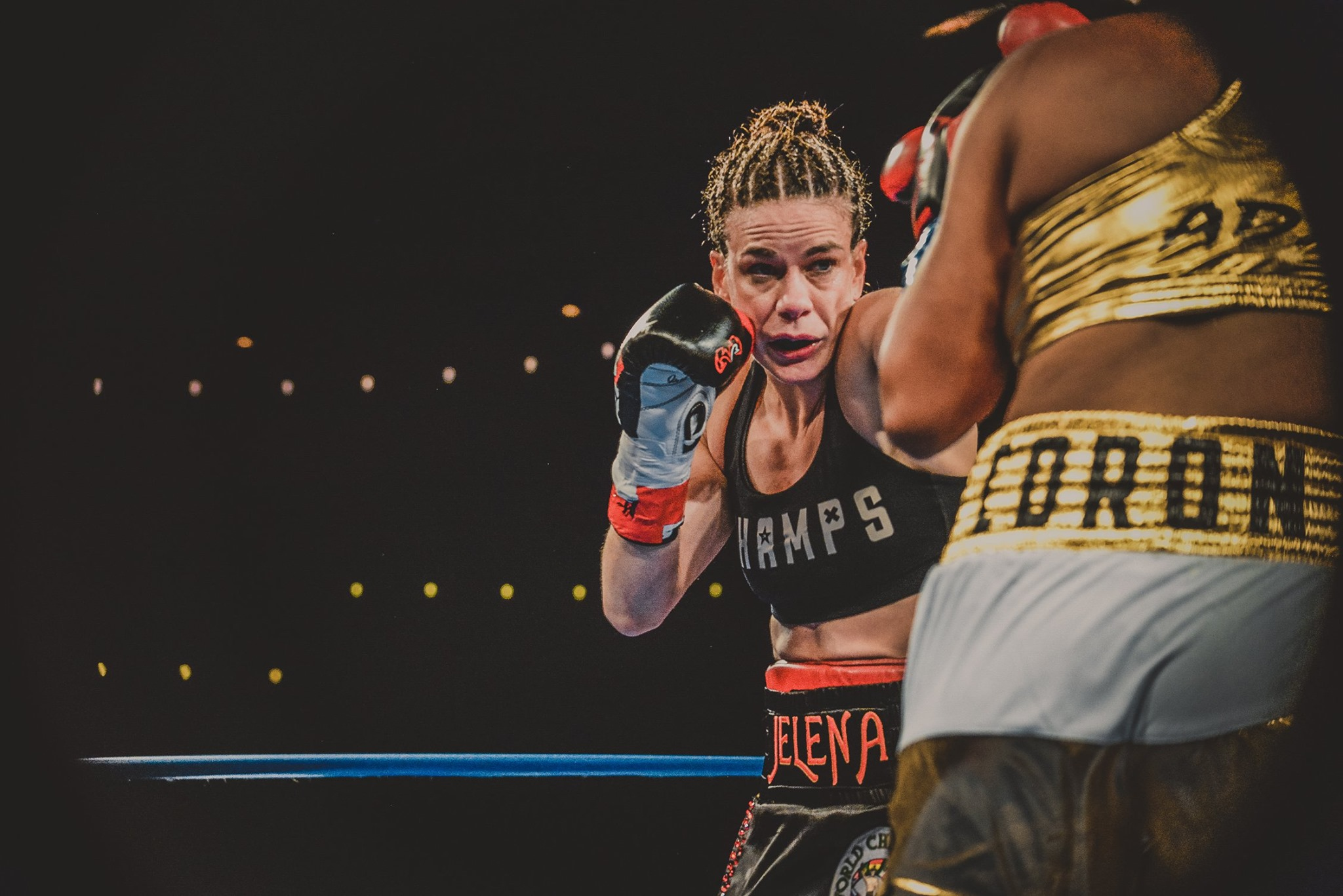

Personal information
- Born: 24 June 1982 (age 44) Hay River, Northwest Territories, Canada
- Height: 5 ft 7 in (170 cm)
- Weight: Featherweight; Super featherweight; Lightweight

Boxing career
- Reach: 67 in (170 cm)
- Stance: Orthodox

Boxing record
- Total fights: 56
- Wins: 42
- Win by KO: 19
- Losses: 12
- Draws: 2
- No contests: 1

Jelena Mrdjenovich (born 24 June 1982) is a Canadian professional boxer.

== Career ==
She has held multiple world championships in three weight classes, including the WBC female super featherweight title from 2005 to 2009; the WIBF lightweight title from 2006 to 2008; the WIBA featherweight title from 2011 to 2012; the WBC female featherweight title three times between 2012 and February 2021; and the WBA female featherweight title from 2016 to April 2021.

In March 2017, a documentary was released about her career.

Her last fight was against Calista Silgado In June 2023.

== Professional boxing record ==
56 fights	42 wins	12 losses
By knockout	19	0
By decision	23	12
Draws	2	

No.	Result	Record	Opponent	Type	Round, time	Date	Location	Notes
56	Win	42–12–2	Calista Silgado	MD	10	Jun 8, 2023	Fantasy Springs Resort Casino, Indio, California, U.S	
55	Loss	41–12–2	Erika Cruz	UD	10	Sep 3, 2022	Centro de Usos Multiples, Hermosillo, Mexico	For WBA featherweight title
54	Loss	41–11–2	Erika Cruz	TD	7 (10), 0:25	Apr 22, 2021	United States Military Academy, West Point, New York, U.S.	Lost WBA featherweight title; Mrdjenovich unable to continue after an accidental head clash
53	Win	41–10–2	Iranda Paola Torres	UD	10	Dec 17, 2020	Wild Card Boxing, Los Angeles, California, U.S.	Retained WBA featherweight title
52	Win	40–10–2	Marisol Corona	MD	8	Sep 13, 2019	Shaw Conference Centre, Edmonton, Alberta, Canada	
51	Win	39–10–2	Vissia Trovato	UD	10	Jun 22, 2019	Shaw Conference Centre, Edmonton, Alberta, Canada	Retained WBA and WBC featherweight titles
50	Win	38–10–2	Stephanie Ducastel	UD	10	Apr 28, 2018	Shaw Conference Centre, Edmonton, Alberta, Canada	Retained WBA and WBC featherweight titles
49	Draw	37–10–2	Stephanie Ducastel	SD	10	Jul 1, 2017	Gymnase des Malteries, Schiltigheim, France	Retained WBA and WBC featherweight titles
48	Win	37–10–1	Gaelle Amand	SD	10	Oct 8, 2016	Gymnase des Maradas, Cergy-Pontoise, France	Retained WBA and WBC featherweight titles
47	Win	36–10–1	Edith Soledad Matthysse	UD	10	Mar 11, 2016	Shaw Conference Centre, Edmonton, Alberta, Canada	Won WBA and WBC featherweight titles
46	Loss	35–10–1	Edith Soledad Matthysse	UD	10	Aug 1, 2015	Ce.De.M. N° 2, Caseros, Argentina	Lost WBC featherweight title; For WBA featherweight title
45	Win	35–9–1	Francia Elena Bravo	TKO	9 (10), 0:40	Mar 27, 2015	Hotel Sortis, Panama City, Panama	Retained WBC featherweight title
44	Win	34–9–1	Pasa Malagic	TKO	3 (8), 1:19	Dec 5, 2014	Shaw Conference Centre, Edmonton, Alberta, Canada	
43	Win	33–9–1	Marilyn Hernandez	RTD	6 (10), 2:00	Sep 12, 2014	Shaw Conference Centre, Edmonton, Alberta, Canada	Retained WBC featherweight title
42	Win	32–9–1	Fatuma Zarika	UD	10	Mar 1, 2014	Shaw Conference Centre, Edmonton, Alberta, Canada	
41	Win	31–9–1	Wanda Pena Ozuna	KO	1 (8), 0:39	Dec 6, 2013	Shaw Conference Centre, Edmonton, Alberta, Canada	
40	Win	30–9–1	Karen Dulin	TKO	2 (8), 1:58	Sep 13, 2013	Shaw Conference Centre, Edmonton, Alberta, Canada	
39	Win	29–9–1	Melissa Hernandez	TD	6 (10), 2:00	May 31, 2013	Shaw Conference Centre, Edmonton, Alberta, Canada	Won WBC featherweight title
38	Loss	28–9–1	Melissa Hernandez	UD	10	Sep 14, 2012	Shaw Conference Centre, Edmonton, Alberta, Canada	Lost WBC featherweight title
37	Win	28–8–1	Belinda Laracuente	UD	8	Jun 22, 2012	Shaw Conference Centre, Edmonton, Alberta, Canada	
36	Win	27–8–1	Lindsay Garbatt	TKO	1 (10), 1:45	Mar 23, 2012	Shaw Conference Centre, Edmonton, Alberta, Canada	Retained WIBA featherweight title; Won vacant WBC featherweight title
35	Win	26–8–1	Olivia Gerula	KO	9 (10), 0:23	Dec 9, 2011	Shaw Conference Centre, Edmonton, Alberta, Canada	Won vacant WIBA featherweight title
34	Win	25–8–1	Emiko Raika	UD	10	Sep 22, 2011	Korakuen Hall, Tokyo, Japan	
33	Loss	24–8–1	Melissa Hernandez	SD	8	Jun 24, 2011	Shaw Conference Centre, Edmonton, Alberta, Canada	
32	Loss	24–7–1	Lindsay Garbatt	MD	10	Feb 4, 2011	Molson Centre, Barrie, Ontario, Canada	For WIBA super-featherweight title
31	Loss	24–6–1	Lindsay Garbatt	SD	10	Nov 19, 2010	Shaw Conference Centre, Edmonton, Alberta, Canada	For vacant WIBA super-featherweight title
30	Win	24–5–1	Dominga Olivo	TKO	6 (8), 1:28	May 7, 2010	Shaw Conference Centre, Edmonton, Alberta, Canada	
29	Loss	23–5–1	Ann Saccurato	UD	10	Nov 13, 2009	Shaw Conference Centre, Edmonton, Alberta, Canada	For WBC lightweight title
28	Loss	23–4–1	Olivia Gerula	UD	10	Apr 9, 2009	Shaw Conference Centre, Edmonton, Alberta, Canada	Lost WBC super-featherweight title
27	Win	23–3–1	Lyndsey Scragg	UD	10	Nov 7, 2008	Shaw Conference Centre, Edmonton, Alberta, Canada	Retained WBC super-featherweight title
26	Win	22–3–1	Lakeysha Williams	UD	8	Sep 12, 2008	Shaw Conference Centre, Edmonton, Alberta, Canada	
25	Loss	21–3–1	Layla McCarter	SD	10	Mar 28, 2008	Shaw Conference Centre, Edmonton, Alberta, Canada	For WBA lightweight title
24	Draw	21–2–1	Dominga Olivo	SD	10	Dec 7, 2007	Shaw Conference Centre, Edmonton, Alberta, Canada	Retained WBC super-featherweight title
23	Win	21–2	Kelli Cofer	UD	10	Sep 28, 2007	Shaw Conference Centre, Edmonton, Alberta, Canada	Retained WIBF lightweight title
22	Win	20–2	Emiko Raika	UD	10	Apr 13, 2007	Shaw Conference Centre, Edmonton, Alberta, Canada	Retained WBC super-featherweight title
21	Win	19–2	Belinda Laracuente	UD	8	Feb 10, 2007	Delta South Hotel, Edmonton, Alberta, Canada	
20	Loss	18–2	Ann Saccurato	SD	10	Nov 4, 2006	Shaw Conference Centre, Edmonton, Alberta, Canada	For vacant WBC lightweight title
19	Win	18–1	Olga Heron	UD	6	Sep 1, 2006	Shaw Conference Centre, Edmonton, Alberta, Canada	
18	Win	17–1	Mia St. John	UD	10	Jun 23, 2006	Shaw Conference Centre, Edmonton, Alberta, Canada	Won vacant WIBF lightweight title
17	Win	16–1	Franchesca Alcanter	KO	5 (10), 1:32	May 20, 2006	Yellowknife, Northwest Territories, Canada	Retained WBC super-featherweight title
16	Win	15–1	Donna Biggers	RTD	2 (10), 2:00	Mar 24, 2006	Shaw Conference Centre, Edmonton, Alberta, Canada	Retained WBC super-featherweight title
15	Win	14–1	Franchesca Alcanter	TKO	6 (10), 0:24	Nov 18, 2005	Shaw Conference Centre, Edmonton, Alberta, Canada	Won inaugural WBC and IWBF super-featherweight titles
14	Win	13–1	LeAnne Villareal	TKO	4 (6)	Aug 27, 2005	Chestermere, Alberta, Canada	
13	Win	12–1	Layla McCarter	UD	8	Jun 18, 2005	Shaw Conference Centre, Edmonton, Alberta, Canada	
12	Win	11–1	Carla Witherspoon	TKO	1 (6), 1:50	Apr 23, 2005	Shaw Conference Centre, Edmonton, Alberta, Canada	
11	Win	10–1	Tracy Carlton	TKO	2 (6), 1:14	Mar 16, 2005	Ranchmans Bar, Calgary, Alberta, Canada	
10	Loss	9–1	Layla McCarter	UD	6	Feb 12, 2005	Ramada Kingsway Inn, Edmonton, Alberta, Canada	
9	Win	9–0	Lisa Lewis	UD	6	Nov 12, 2004	Shaw Conference Centre, Edmonton, Alberta, Canada	
8	Win	8–0	Tracy Carlton	UD	6	Oct 15, 2004	Radisson Hotel, Calgary, Alberta, Canada	
7	Win	7–0	Olivia Gerula	KO	4 (6), 1:13	Sep 24, 2004	Convention Centre, Winnipeg, Manitoba, Canada	
6	Win	6–0	Olga Heron	UD	6	Jun 25, 2004	Shaw Conference Centre, Edmonton, Alberta, Canada	
5	Win	5–0	Ragan Pudwill	TKO	1 (4), 1:50	May 14, 2004	Chateau Lacombe Hotel, Edmonton, Alberta, Canada	
4	Win	4–0	Shannon Gunville	RTD	2 (4), 2:00	Jan 16, 2004	Fort Garry Place, Winnipeg, Manitoba, Canada	
3	Win	3–0	Olga Heron	MD	4	Dec 5, 2003	Shaw Conference Centre, Edmonton, Alberta, Canada	
2	Win	2–0	Robin Beaulieu	TKO	1 (4)	Sep 12, 2003	Chateau Lacombe Hotel, Edmonton, Alberta, Canada	
1	Win	1–0	Cathy Boyes	TKO	2 (4)	Jan 25, 2003	Shaw Conference Centre, Edmonton, Alberta, Canada	

== See also ==
- List of female boxers

Sporting positions
Minor world boxing titles
New title	IWBF super-featherweight champion November 18, 2005 – 2006; Vacated	Vacant Title next held by Melissa Fiorentino
Vacant Title last held by Nathalie Toro	WIBF lightweight champion June 23, 2006 – 2007; Vacated	Vacant Title next held by Ramona Kuehne
Vacant Title last held by Jeannine Garside	WIBA featherweight champion December 9, 2011 – 2012; Vacated	Vacant Title next held by Amanda Serrano
Major world boxing titles
Inaugural champion	WBC super-featherweight champion November 18, 2005 – April 9, 2009	Succeeded by Olivia Gerula
Vacant Title last held by Jeannine Garside	WBC featherweight champion March 23, 2012 – September 14, 2012	Succeeded by Melissa Hernández
Preceded by Melissa Hernández	WBC featherweight champion May 31, 2013 – August 1, 2015	Succeeded by Edith Soledad Matthysse
Preceded by Edith Soledad Matthysse	WBA featherweight champion March 11, 2016 – April 22, 2021	Succeeded by Erika Cruz
Preceded by Edith Soledad Matthysse	WBC featherweight champion March 11, 2016 – February 2021; Vacated	Vacant Title next held by Amanda Serrano
