= Jeannine Garside =

Canadian boxer (born 1978)

Personal information
- Born: April 14, 1978 (age 48) Duncan, British Columbia, Canada
- Height: 5 ft 5 1/2 in (166 cm)
- Weight: Super bantamweight; Featherweight; Super featherweight; Lightweight

Boxing career
- Stance: Southpaw

Boxing record
- Total fights: 14
- Wins: 10
- Win by KO: 4
- Losses: 3
- Draws: 1
Medal record
Women's Amateur boxing
Representing Canada
World Championships
Bronze medal – third place	2001 Scranton	Featherweight

Jeannine Garside (born April 14, 1978) is a Canadian former professional boxer who competed from 2004 to 2010. She was a two-weight world champion, having held the WIBA super-bantamweight title from 2005 to 2006; the WIBA featherweight title twice between 2006 and 2010; and the unified WBC and WBO female featherweight titles in 2010.

== Amateur career ==
Garside began boxing as an amateur in Duncan, British Columbia, Canada after seeing Christy Martin fight Deirdre Gogarty on a Mike Tyson undercard in March 1996. Jeannine was the British Columbia champion in 1998 and 1999 and was named British Columbia Boxer of the Year in 1998.

On 24 January 1999, in the 57 kg final of the 1999 Canadian National Championships held in Sudbury, Ontario, she defeated Danielle Bouchard of Quebec by a 5-3 score to win her first national title and earn a place on the Canadian National Women's Boxing team that would soon pit her against some of the best female fighters in the world at her weight.

On 4 December 1999 in the 57 kg final of the 2000 Canadian National Championships at the Sportsplex in Campbell River, British Columbia, Garside defeated Michelle Collins of Alberta by an 11-1 score.

She tore an ACL in her knee during a touch football game in 2000 and this injury required reconstructive surgery.

Garside returned to the ring and on 27 January 2001 in the 57 kg final of the 2001 Canadian National Championships in Cap-de-la-Madelaine, Quebec, she defeated Wendy Broad of Quebec by an 11-4 score and was voted the tournament's Best Boxer.

At the Canadian National Senior Championships in St. Catharines, Ontario in January 2002, she won her fourth straight 57 kg national title with an RSC-2 win over Angie Collins of Ontario.

On 29 August 2002 in Kansas City, Missouri, Garside won a unanimous decision over USA Champion Jennifer Han of El Paso, Texas in the Women's 126 lb division.

On 2 September 2002 in the 126-lb final of the Ringside National Tournament in Kansas City, Missouri, she knocked out Sharon Gaines of Seattle, Washington, USA in the third round.

Garside finished her amateur boxing career with a 40-5 record.

== Professional career ==
On 4 December 2004 at the Emerald Queen Casino in Tacoma, Washington, Garside won her pro-debut when she defeated Heather Percival by a unanimous decision.

On 26 August 2005 at the Renaissance Worthington Hotel in Fort Worth, Texas, Garside improved to 2-0 as a pro with a four-round unanimous (39-36, 40-36, 40-36) decision over Rita Serrano.

On 8 October 2005 at the outdoor Amphitheater at Harrah's in Laughlin, Nevada, Garside won by a TKO at 1:25 in the fifth round over Rita Valentini.

On 18 November 2005 at the Shaw Conference Centre in Edmonton, Alberta, Canada, Garside won the WIBA super-bantamweight title with a 10-round unanimous decision over Lisa Brown.

On 16 February 2006 at Harrah's in North Kansas City, Missouri, she won a third round TKO over Kim Colbert, in a scheduled six-round non-title bout

After vacating her super-bantamweight title, Garside claimed the vacant WIBF featherweight championship with a unanimous decision win over Laura Serrano on 4 November 2006 at the Shaw Conference Centre in Edmonton, Alberta, Canada.

On 3 July 2010, she defeated the WBC, WBO and WIBF female featherweight title holder Ina Menzer in Stuttgart, Germany, to become a unified world champion. This proved to be her last fight as she retired to concentrate on her family.

In 2015, Garside was inducted into the International Women's Boxing Hall of Fame.

== Professional boxing record ==
14 fights	10 wins	3 losses
By knockout	4	0
By decision	6	3
Draws	1	

No.	Result	Record	Opponent	Type	Round, time	Date	Location	Notes
14	Win	10–3–1	Ina Menzer	UD	10	Jul 3, 2010	Porsche-Arena, Stuttgart, Germany	Won WBC, WBO, and WIBF featherweight titles
13	Win	9–3–1	Lindsay Garbatt	KO	3 (10), 1:23	Apr 24, 2010	Fuller Lake Arena, Chemainus, Canada	Won vacant WIBA featherweight title
12	Win	8–3–1	Dominga Olivo	UD	8	Jun 6, 2009	Island Savings Centre, Duncan, Canada	Won vacant WBC International featherweight title
11	Loss	7–3–1	Irma Balijagic Adler	SD	10	Dec 17, 2008	Olympic Arena, Sarajevo, Bosnia and Herzegovina	Lost WIBA featherweight title
10	Loss	7–2–1	Ji-Hye Woo	UD	10	Sep 28, 2008	Hanam Gymnasium, Hanam, South Korea	For IFBA super-featherweight title
9	Loss	7–1–1	Chevelle Hallback	SD	10	Jun 13, 2008	Isleta Casino & Resort, Albuquerque, New Mexico, U.S.	For vacant IFBA lightweight title
8	Win	7–0–1	Brooke Dierdorff	TKO	6 (6), 1:10	Sep 21, 2007	Meadow Brook Music Festival, Rochester Hills, Michigan, U.S.	
7	Win	6–0–1	Laura Serrano	UD	10	Nov 4, 2006	Shaw Conference Centre, Edmonton, Canada	Won vacant WIBA featherweight title
6	Draw	5–0–1	Lisa Brown	MD	10	Jun 23, 2006	Shaw Conference Centre, Edmonton, Canada	Retained WIBA super-bantamweight title
5	Win	5–0	Kim Colbert	TKO	3 (6), 1:40	Feb 16, 2006	Harrah's Casino, Kansas City, Missouri, U.S.	
4	Win	4–0	Lisa Brown	UD	10	Nov 28, 2005	Shaw Conference Centre, Edmonton, Canada	Won WIBA super-bantamweight title
3	Win	3–0	Margherita Valentini	TKO	5 (6), 1:25	Oct 8, 2005	Harrah's, Laughlin, Nevada, U.S.	
2	Win	2–0	Rita Serrano	UD	4	Aug 26, 2005	Renaissance Worthington Hotel, Fort Worth, Texas, U.S.	
1	Win	1–0	Heather Percival	UD	4	Dec 4, 2004	Emerald Queen Casino, Tacoma, Washington, U.S.	

== See also ==
- List of female boxers
- List of southpaw stance boxers

Sporting positions
Regional boxing titles
New title	WBC International featherweight champion June 6, 2009 – April 24, 2010; Won WIBA title	Vacant Title next held by Chunyan Xu
Minor world boxing titles
Preceded by Lisa Brown	WIBA super-bantamweight champion November 18, 2005 – 2006; Vacated	Vacant Title next held by Melissa Hernández
Vacant Title last held by Marcela Acuña	WIBA featherweight champion November 4, 2006 – December 17, 2008	Succeeded by Irma Balijagic Adler
Vacant Title last held by Irma Balijagic Adler	WIBA featherweight champion April 24, 2010 – 2011; Vacated	Vacant Title next held by Jelena Mrdjenovich
Preceded by Ina Menzer	WIBF featherweight champion July 3, 2010 – 2011; Retired	Vacant Title next held by Elina Tissen
Major world boxing titles
Preceded by Ina Menzer	WBC featherweight champion July 3, 2010 – 2011; Retired	Vacant Title next held by Jelena Mrdjenovich
Preceded by Ina Menzer	WBO featherweight champion July 3, 2010 – 2011; Retired	Vacant Title next held by Alejandra Oliveras
