= Lindsay Garbatt =

Canadian boxer (born 1982)

- Born: September 25, 1982 (age 44)
- Nationality: Canadian
- Height: 5 ft 3 in (1.60 m)
- Weight: 123 lb (56 kg; 8.8 st)
- Division: Flyweight
- Reach: 70.0 in (178 cm)
- Style: Boxing
- Stance: Orthodox

Professional boxing record
- Total: 15
- Wins: 8
- By knockout: 3
- Losses: 7
- By knockout: 3

Mixed martial arts record
- Total: 12
- Wins: 6
- By knockout: 4
- By decision: 2
- Losses: 6
- By submission: 2
- By decision: 4

Other information
- Boxing record from BoxRec
- Mixed martial arts record from Sherdog

Lindsay Garbatt (born September 25, 1982) is a Canadian female boxer and mixed martial artist. She competes professionally since 2008 and is the current women's International Boxing Association champion and mixed martial artist.

== Boxing record ==
8 Wins ( 3 knockouts, 7 decisions), 7 Losses (0 decisions, 0 retirement), 2 Draws
Result	Record	Opponent	Type	Rd, Time	Date	Location	Notes
Loss	8–7–2	(China) Chun Yan Xu	MD		2014-02-05	City Hall, Haikou, China	vacant WBC International female featherweight title
Win	8–6–2	(United States) Jackie Trivilino	MD		2013-10-25	(United States) Washington Avenue Armory, Albany, New York, USA	vacant Women's International Boxing Association World featherweight title
Draw	8–6–2	(United States) Jackie Trivilino	SD		2013-07-26	(United States) City Center, Saratoga Springs, New York, USA	
Loss		(United States) Ronica Jeffrey	UD		2012-08-31	(United States) Dover Downs Hotel & Casino, Dover, Delaware, USA	vacant WBC Silver female super featherweight title
Loss	7–5–0	(Canada) Jelena Mrdjenovich	TKO		2012-03-23	Shaw Conference Centre, Edmonton, Alberta, Canada	vacant WBC World female featherweight title, Women's International Boxing Association World featherweight title
Loss	7–4–1	(Australia) Diana Prazak	TKO		2011-09-24	Grand Star Receptions, Altona North, Victoria, Australia	Women's International Boxing Association World super featherweight title
Win	9–2–0	(Canada) Jelena Mrdjenovich	MD		2011-02-04	Shaw Conference Centre, Edmonton, Alberta, Canada	Women's International Boxing Association World super featherweight title
Win	8–2–0	(Canada) Jelena Mrdjenovich	SD		2010-11-19	Shaw Conference Centre, Edmonton, Alberta, Canada	vacant Women's International Boxing Association World super featherweight title
Draw	7–2–1	(United States) Melissa Hernandez	MD		2010-10-16	(United States) Santa Ana Star Casino, Bernalillo, New Mexico, USA	vacant Global Boxing Union Female World super featherweight title, vacant Women's International Boxing Association World super featherweight title
Win	7–1–0	(United States) Melissa Hernandez	MD		2010-06-05	(United States) National Guard Armory, Evansville, Indiana, USA	
Loss	6–1–0	(Canada) Jeannine Garside	KO		2010-04-24	Fuller Lake Arena, Chemainus, British Columbia, Canada	
Win	5–1–0	(United States) Ayana Pelletier	UD		2009-11-13	Shaw Conference Centre, Edmonton, Alberta, Canada	
Win	4–1–0	(United States) Maureen Shea	TKO		2009-08-01	(United States) Mohegan Sun Casino, Uncasville, Connecticut, USA	
Loss	3–1–0	(United States) Ela Nunez	UD		2008-11-19	(United States) OnCenter, Syracuse, New York, USA	
Win	2–1–0	(United States) Lucia Larcinese	TKO		2008-07-19	Quinte Sports Centre, Belleville, Ontario, Canada	
Win	1–1–0	(United States) Tracy Hutt	KO		2008-03-05	(United States) Hammerstein Ballroom, New York, New York, USA	
Loss	0–1–0	(United States) Ela Nunez	MD		2007-08-16	(United States) Frontier Field, Rochester, New York	

== Mixed martial arts record ==
Professional record breakdown
12 matches	6 wins	6 losses
By knockout	4	0
By submission	0	2
By decision	2	4

Res.	Record	Opponent	Method	Event	Date	Round	Time	Location	Notes
Loss	6–6	Lupita Godinez	Decision (unanimous)	BTC 8: Eliminator	November 30, 2019	5	5:00	Niagara Falls, Ontario, Canada	
Loss	6–5	Cheyanne Vlismas	Decision (unanimous)	BTC 6: Night of Champions	June 1, 2019	3	5:00	Burlington, Ontario, Canada	
Loss	6–4	Rayanne Amanda	Submission (armbar)	BTC 4: Vendetta	November 24, 2018	1	1:50	Peterborough, Ontario, Canada	
Win	6–3	Rayanne Amanda	Decision (majority)	BTC 3: Profecy	June 23, 2018	3	5:00	Burlington, Ontario, Canada	
Loss	5–3	Ashley Nichols	Decision (unanimous)	TKO 39- Ultimatum	June 16, 2017	3	5:00	Saint-Roch-de-l'Achigan, Quebec, Canada	
Win	5–2	Corinne Laframboise	KO (punch)	TKO 39 - Ultimatum	June 16, 2017	1	1:53	Saint-Roch-de-l'Achigan, Quebec, Canada	
Loss	4–2	Griet Eeckhout	Submission (rear-naked choke)	TKO 37 - Rivals	January 13, 2017	1	3:07	Montréal, Canada	
Win	4–1	Maguy Orton Berchel	TKO (punches)	TKO 36 - The Return	November 4, 2016	3	3:30	Montréal, Canada	
Win	3–1	Valeria Mejia	TKO (punches)	HKFC - School of Hard Knocks 46	October 23, 2015	3	0:25	Calgary, Alberta, Canada	
Loss	2–1	Calie Cutler	Decision (unanimous)	WXC 59 - Homeland Pride	August 8, 2015	3	5:00	Taylor, Michigan, United States	
Win	2–0	Shiori Hori	TKO (Punches)	Pancrase - 265	March 15, 2015	1	1:01	Tokyo, Japan	
Win	1–0	Stephanie Essensa	Decision (Unanimous)	HKFC - School of Hard Knocks 40	December 12, 2014	3	5:00	Calgary, Alberta, Canada	
