= Alicia Melina =

German boxer

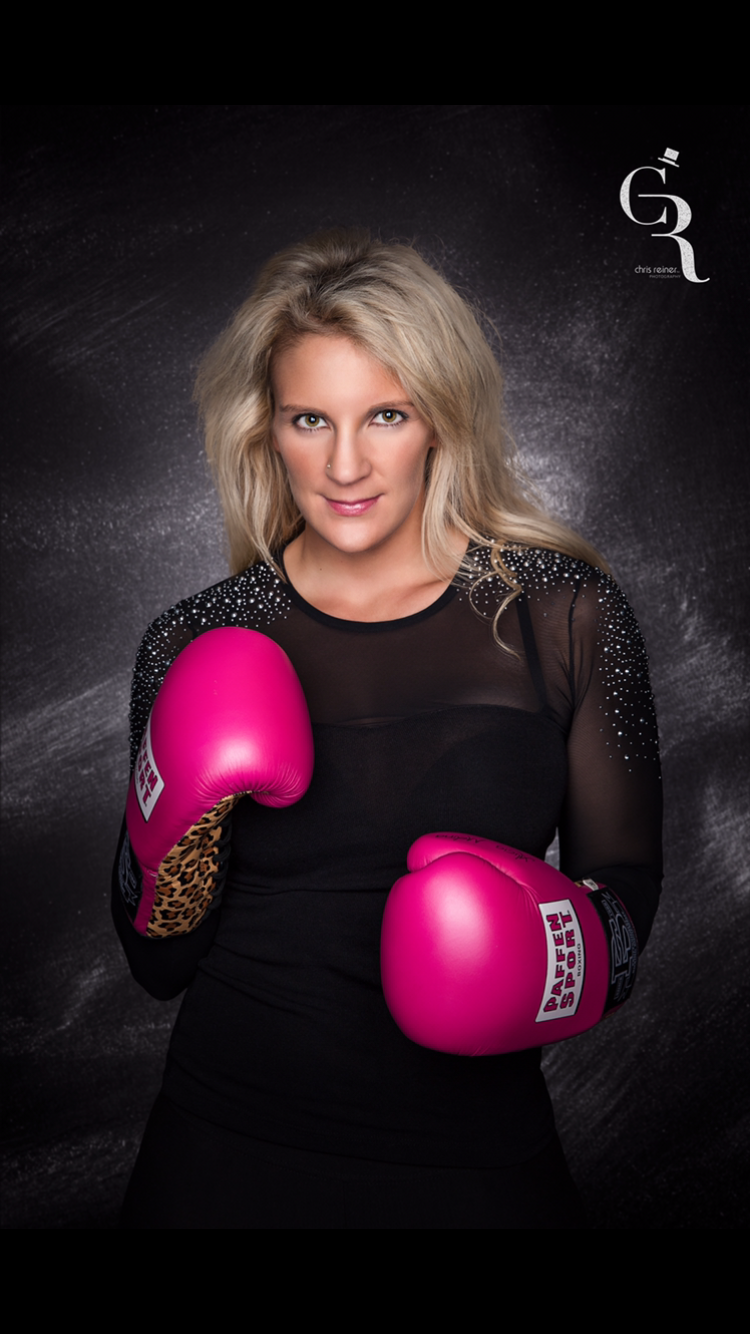

Personal information
- Nationality: German
- Born: Alicia Melina Kummer; 24 June 1988 (age 38) Buchholz, Niedersachsen, West Germany
- Height: 1.71 m (5 ft 7 in)
- Weight: Light Welterweight

Boxing career
- Stance: Orthodox

Boxing record
- Total fights: 14
- Wins: 13
- Win by KO: 8
- Losses: 1

Alicia Melina Winter, née Kummer (born 24 June 1988), is a German professional boxer and singer. She held the WIBF light welterweight title in 2017.

== Professional boxing record ==
14 fights	13 wins	1 loss
By knockout	8	0
By decision	5	1

No.	Result	Record	Opponent	Type	Round, time	Date	Location	Notes
14								
13								
12								
11								
10								
9								
8								
7								
6								
5								
4								
3								
2								
1								
