= Selina Barrios =

American boxer (born 1993)

Personal information
- Nickname: Aztec Queen
- Born: 29 January 1993 (age 33) Racine, Wisconsin, USA
- Height: 5 ft 5 in (165 cm)
- Weight: Lightweight

Boxing career

Boxing record
- Total fights: 7
- Wins: 6
- Win by KO: 3
- Losses: 1

Selina Barrios (born 29 January 1993) is an American former professional boxer who held the North American Boxing Federation female lightweight title.

== Career ==
Trained by former world champion Carlos Hernández, Barrios made her professional debut at Alzafar Shrine Auditorium in San Antonio, Texas, on 21 January 2017, knocking out Tammy Franks in the first of their scheduled four-round bout.

Having defeated Jasmine Clarkson via unanimous decision at the Event Center in San Antonio on 9 September 2017 in her second pro-fight, she faced Lisa Porter for the vacant North American Boxing Federation (NABF) female lightweight title at Rapides Parish Coliseum in Alexandria, Louisiana, on 29 December 2017, claiming the belt thanks to a majority decision victory with two of the ringside judges scoring the contest 97–93 and 96–94 respectively in her favour, while the third had it a 95–95 draw.

Next, Barrios knocked out Aida Satybaldinova in the fourth round of their non-title fight at American Bank Center in Corpus Christi, Texas, on 7 July 2018.

Returning to Corpus Christi, she made a successful first defense of her NABF championship against Patricia Juarez at Whataburger Field on 22 September 2018, winning by unanimous decision.

In her next outing on 27 April 2019, Barrios took on former WBC female featherweight champion Melissa Hernández in an eight-round non-title bout at the Cajundome in Lafayette, Louisiana. She suffered her first professional defeat, losing via unanimous decision.

Back at the scene of her debut fight, Alzafar Shrine Auditorium, on 3 August 2019, Barrios returned to winning ways by stopping Nina Gallegos just 42 seconds into the first round.

== Personal life ==
Barrios is the older sister of world champion boxer Mario Barrios. After ending her in-ring career, she began working as a boxing trainer.

== Professional boxing record ==
7 fights	6 wins	1 loss
By knockout	3	0
By decision	3	1

No.	Result	Record	Opponent	Type	Round, time	Date	Location	Notes
7	Win	6–1	Nina Gallegos	KO	1 (4), 0:42	3 Aug 2019	Alzafar Shrine Auditorium, San Antonio, Texas, U.S	
6	Loss	5–1	Melissa Hernández	UD	8	27 Apr 2019	Cajundome, Lafayette, Louisiana, U.S	
5	Win	5–0	Patricia Juarez	UD	10	22 Sep 2018	Whataburger Field, Corpus Christi, Texas, U.S	Retained NABF female lightweight title
4	Win	4–0	Aida Satybaldinova	KO	4 (8), 1:24	7 Jul 2018	American Bank Center, Corpus Christi, Texas, U.S	
3	Win	3–0	Lisa Porter	MD	10	29 Dec 2017	Rapides Parish Coliseum, Alexandria, Louisiana, U.S	Won vacant NABF female lightweight title
2	Win	2–0	Jasmine Clarkson	UD	4	9 Sep 2017	Event Centre, San Antonio, Texas, U.S	
1	Win	1–0	Tammy Franks	KO	1 (4), 0:40	21 Jan 2017	Alzafar Shrine Auditorium, San Antonio, Texas, U.S	
