= Joey Gilbert =

American lawyer and former boxer

Joseph Salvatore "Joey" Gilbert (born June 5, 1976) is an American attorney, former professional boxer, and Republican political figure from Reno, Nevada. A three-time collegiate national champion at the University of Nevada, Reno, he competed on the first season of The Contender and held regional WBO and WBC middleweight titles before retiring in 2010. He has practiced law in Reno since 2004.

During the COVID-19 pandemic Gilbert was director of strategy for America's Frontline Doctors and filed litigation against Nevada's emergency public-health orders. He was present outside the United States Capitol during the January 6, 2021 attack, and finished second to Joe Lombardo in the 2022 Republican primary for governor of Nevada; a court dismissed his subsequent election contest and ordered him to pay sanctions and attorney fees. From 2023 to 2025 his firm served as legal counsel to the Douglas County School District. Since 2025 he has been a defendant in a legal-malpractice lawsuit in Clark County, Nevada, in which he denies liability.

== Early life and education ==
Gilbert was born in Chicago and raised in Sparks, Nevada. He attended Our Lady of the Snows parochial school and Bishop Manogue Catholic High School in Reno, graduating in 1994. He earned a Bachelor of Arts in English literature and political science, with a minor in Italian, from the University of Nevada, Reno, and spent part of 1998 in a study-abroad program based in Turin, Italy. He received a Juris Doctor from the Thomas Jefferson School of Law in San Diego in 2003 and was admitted to the State Bar of Nevada in 2004.

== Boxing career ==
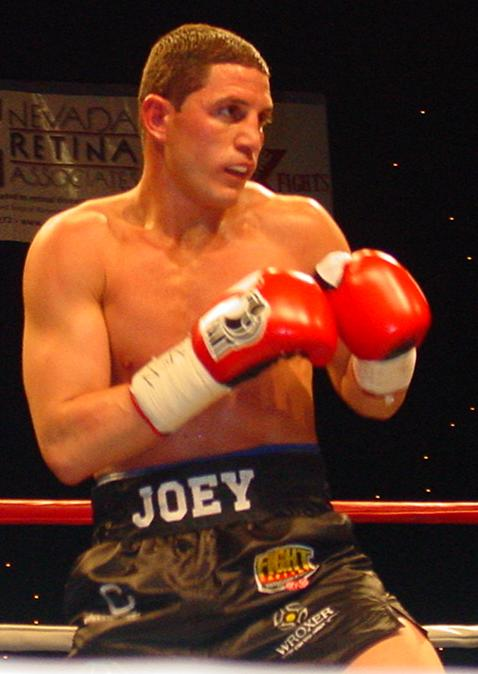
Gilbert in 2010

=== Amateur ===
Gilbert boxed as an amateur at the University of Nevada, Reno, where he was a three-time National Collegiate Boxing Association national champion, a four-time regional champion, and a four-time All-American, and won the Nevada State Golden Gloves super middleweight championship in 2000. He finished his amateur career with a record of 27–1.

=== Professional ===
Gilbert made his professional debut in June 2000 in Reno. In 2004 he was cast on NBC's reality series The Contender, where he was placed on the West Coast team and defeated Jimmy Lange in the first round of the competition before losing a technical decision to Peter Manfredo Jr. in the quarterfinals after an accidental head-butt opened a cut that stopped the bout.

After The Contender, Gilbert defeated Lange in a February 2006 rematch at the Patriot Center to win the vacant WBO-NABO middleweight title, and in May 2007 won the vacant WBC-USNBC middleweight title against Juan Astorga in Reno.

On September 21, 2007, Gilbert scored a first-round stoppage of Charles Howe at the Grand Sierra Resort in Reno, but the result was changed to a no-decision after he tested positive for banned substances in urine tests taken before and after the bout. The Nevada Athletic Commission suspended him, with executive director Keith Kizer stating that Gilbert had tested positive for a steroid, methamphetamine, and amphetamine. Gilbert contested the findings. At a November 2007 commission hearing, his toxicologist reported that a retest of the "B" sample was negative for methamphetamine but positive for amphetamine, and Gilbert said the amphetamine result reflected a prescribed stimulant he had taken for years; a private test he had commissioned again showed a stanozolol metabolite, which he said he could only have ingested unknowingly. The commission later dismissed the methamphetamine charge after receiving conflicting results.

In January 2008, Gilbert's attorney Mark Schopper moved to have Kizer recuse himself, accusing him of making "false, misleading, negligent and defamatory statements" to the media and of improper contact with a defense witness; Kizer said the motion had no merit. Gilbert later accepted responsibility for the positive test. In 2023 the Financial Times reported that Gilbert denies using steroids. On August 12, 2008, he agreed to pay a $10,000 fine and accept a one-year suspension, retroactive to the date of the fight, for the positive steroid test; as part of the settlement the commission dropped the charges relating to amphetamine, methamphetamine, oxazepam, diazepam, and nordiazepam.

On February 14, 2009, Gilbert challenged former Contender rival Jesse Brinkley for the WBC-USNBC super middleweight title at the Reno Events Center and lost by unanimous decision.

He retired from professional boxing in September 2010 after a sixth-round technical knockout loss to former IBF light middleweight champion Kassim Ouma at the Grand Sierra Resort.

== Professional boxing record ==
24 fights	20 wins	3 losses
By knockout	15	1
By decision	5	2
Draws	0	
No contests	1	

No.	Result	Record	Opponent	Type	Round, time	Date	Location	Notes
24	Loss	20–3 (1)	(Uganda) Kassim Ouma	TKO	6 (10), 0:59	2010-09-25	(United States) Grand Sierra Resort, Reno, Nevada, USA	For vacant WBA-NABA Middleweight title.
23	Win	20–2 (1)	(United States) Billy Bailey	UD	8	2010-07-03	(United States) Grand Sierra Resort, Reno, Nevada, USA	
22	Win	19–2 (1)	(United States) Anthony Bartinelli	TKO	7 (8), 0:40	2010-05-22	(United States) Grand Sierra Resort, Reno, Nevada, USA	
21	Win	18–2 (1)	(United States) Ivan Stovall	KO	5 (8), 1:05	2009-08-29	(United States) Churchill County Fairgrounds, Fallon, Nevada, USA	
20	Loss	17–2 (1)	(United States) Jesse Brinkley	UD	12	2009-02-14	(United States) Reno Events Center, Reno, Nevada, USA	For WBC United States (USNBC) Super middleweight title.
19	Win	17–1 (1)	(United States) William Johnson	KO	2 (6), 1:18	2008-11-20	(United States) Michael's Eighth Avenue, Glen Burnie, Maryland, USA	
18	Win	16–1 (1)	(United States) Dan Wallace	TKO	2 (6), 1:59	2008-10-30	(United States) Martin's Valley Mansion, Cockeysville, Maryland, USA	
17	ND	15–1 (1)	(United States) Charles Howe	ND	1 (10), 2:16	2007-09-21	(United States) Grand Sierra Resort, Reno, Nevada, USA	Retained WBC United States (USNBC) Middleweight title. Originally TKO win for Gilbert; overturned to a No Decision after he failed his post-fight drug test.
16	Win	15–1	(United States) Juan Astorga	TKO	10 (12), 1:47	2007-05-12	(United States) Reno Events Center, Reno, Nevada, USA	Won vacant WBC United States (USNBC) Middleweight title.
15	Win	14–1	(Mexico) Michi Munoz	UD	12	2007-03-02	(United States) MontBleu Resort Casino & Spa, Stateline, Nevada, USA	Retained WBO-NABO Middleweight title.
14	Win	13–1	(United States) Keith Sims	TKO	6 (12), 1:57	2006-10-11	(United States) Westchester County Center, White Plains, New York, USA	Retained WBO-NABO Middleweight title.
13	Win	12–1	(United States) Jason Aaker	KO	1 (8), 2:50	2006-08-05	(United States) MontBleu Resort Casino & Spa, Stateline, Nevada, USA	
12	Win	11–1	(United States) Jimmy Lange	TKO	3 (12), 2:52	2006-02-18	(United States) Patriot Center, George Mason University, Fairfax, Virginia, USA	Won vacant WBO-NABO Middleweight title.
11	Win	10–1	(United States) James North	UD	6	2005-11-05	(United States) Caesars Tahoe, Stateline, Nevada, USA	
10	Loss	9–1	(United States) Peter Manfredo Jr.	TD	5 (5), 2:34	2004-09-07	(United States) Pasadena, California, USA	The bout was stopped after a cut from an accidental headbutt rendered Gilbert unable to continue.
9	Win	9–0	(United States) Jimmy Lange	UD	5	2004-09-07	(United States) Pasadena, California, USA	
8	Win	8–0	(United States) Farid Shahid	UD	6	2004-07-10	(United States) Caesars Tahoe, Stateline, Nevada, USA	
7	Win	7–0	(United States) Kirk Douglas	TKO	4 (6), 1:50	2004-04-24	(United States) Hilton Hotel Reno, Reno, Nevada, USA	
6	Win	6–0	(United States) Thomas Haines	TKO	1 (4), 2:01	2004-03-27	(United States) Caesars Tahoe, Stateline, Nevada, USA	
5	Win	5–0	(United States) Tony Sanza	TKO	1 (4), 2:14	2003-11-22	(United States) Caesars Tahoe, Stateline, Nevada, USA	
4	Win	4–0	(United States) Travis Biechler	TKO	1 (4), 2:41	2002-07-26	(United States) Orleans Hotel & Casino, Las Vegas, Nevada, USA	
3	Win	3–0	(United States) Timothy Robinson	TKO	2 (4), 1:55	2002-06-07	(United States) Eldorado Resort Casino, Reno, Nevada, USA	
2	Win	2–0	(United States) Tony Sanza	KO	1 (4), 2:36	2001-07-20	(United States) Harrah's Hotel & Casino, Reno, Nevada, USA	
1	Win	1–0	(United States) Miguel Angel Lopez	TKO	2 (4), 2:47	2000-06-16	(United States) Harrah's Hotel & Casino, Reno, Nevada, USA	Professional debut.

== Legal career ==
Gilbert has practiced law in Reno since 2004, primarily in criminal defense, DUI, personal injury, and family law. He founded Joey Gilbert & Associates, Ltd., which does business as Joey Gilbert Law, in January 2011.

=== 2021 State Bar reprimand proceeding ===
In December 2021, the Associated Press reported that a screening panel of the State Bar of Nevada had sent Gilbert a draft letter of reprimand dated August 27, 2021. The draft alleged that his firm had allowed a law student to handle a client's matter without the required supervision, that the student falsely implied to the client that a petition had been filed, and that Gilbert did not promptly tell the client, who had paid a $3,500 retainer, that the firm would no longer represent him. The draft stated that the conduct "actually injured the integrity of the profession." The panel denied Gilbert's motion to dismiss on December 1, 2021. Gilbert's attorney, Dominic Gentile, said Gilbert denied the allegations and that no final determination had been made; bar counsel said the letter was unofficial and that no discipline would be imposed without a further hearing.

=== COVID-19 litigation and America's Frontline Doctors ===
During the COVID-19 pandemic, Gilbert became director of strategy for America's Frontline Doctors (AFLDS), a group that promoted hydroxychloroquine and ivermectin as COVID-19 treatments and opposed mask and vaccine mandates. He represented physicians seeking to prescribe hydroxychloroquine, spoke against local mask mandates, and described the pandemic as a "plandemic". In August 2021, he and Las Vegas attorney Sigal Chattah, who was later named Nevada's acting U.S. Attorney, filed a federal lawsuit on behalf of parents against Governor Steve Sisolak, Attorney General Aaron Ford, and the Clark County School District challenging the school mask mandate. In 2021 he called vaccines "garbage", said "masks don't work", and accused Anthony Fauci of "murder".

Simone Gold, the group's founder, asked Gilbert to join the AFLDS board in March 2021 and later named him its chair. After Gold reported to federal prison in 2022 for entering the Capitol on January 6, Gilbert took over the organization's operations. He said he found improper personal spending by Gold, which she denied; Gold in turn said Gilbert had overpaid himself and others, which he denied, saying he was doing the work of five employees. In November 2022, AFLDS and Gilbert sued Gold in federal court in Florida, alleging that she had misused the organization's funds, including to purchase a $3.6 million home in Naples, Florida. Gold sued Gilbert and two other board members in Arizona. According to AFLDS, the federal suit was dismissed in December 2022. In January 2023 the Arizona judge issued a statement critical of both sides, writing that Gilbert's "unauthorised pay increase smacks of self-dealing" and that Gold's proposal to use donated funds for a for-profit business was "simply absurd"; the court issued no decision. Gilbert left the organization in 2023, telling the Financial Times, "I am very glad I have nothing to do with that mess."

=== Remdesivir wrongful-death suit – Dillon v. Gilbert ===
In October 2021, Melissa Dillon, whose 65-year-old father Billy Wayne Henderson was hospitalized with COVID-19 at Northern Nevada Medical Center in Sparks, contacted Joey Gilbert, then a candidate for governor, for help. Joey Gilbert introduced Dillon to his father, Dr. Warren Gilbert, a family physician, who went to the hospital seeking to administer hydroxychloroquine and ivermectin to Henderson and was turned away by hospital staff. Henderson died on October 31, 2021.

On November 23, 2022, Joey Gilbert and Las Vegas attorney Sigal Chattah, who was later named Nevada's acting U.S. Attorney, filed a wrongful-death and medical-malpractice suit on Dillon's behalf against the hospital's operator, Sparks Family Hospital, Inc., and several physicians in district court in Washoe County. The complaint alleged that the hospital had administered the antiviral drug remdesivir over the family's objections and that the drug caused Henderson's death. The attorneys publicized the filing as the first remdesivir wrongful-death lawsuit in Nevada. Joey Gilbert said "a reckoning is coming", and Sigal Chattah wrote on social media, "They knew the science. They lied. They killed people. No mercy. No amnesty." The suit's required medical-expert affidavit was signed by Dr. Warren Gilbert, who was not an infectious-disease specialist. The Henderson wrongful-death case was dismissed in 2023 as barred by Nevada's one-year statute of limitations for professional-negligence claims.

In May 2025, Dillon sued Joey Gilbert, his law firm, Sigal Chattah, and Sigal Chattah's firm for legal malpractice, breach of fiduciary duty, and intentional misrepresentation in district court in Clark County; Dr. Warren Gilbert is also a defendant. The complaint alleged that the attorneys had been unfamiliar with the one-year limitations period, that they had relied on Dr. Warren Gilbert rather than an independent expert, that the original complaint contained multiple factual errors, and that a board-certified infectious-disease expert had subsequently concluded that remdesivir was never administered to Henderson. Dillon alleged she "was led to believe that her father was murdered for personal greed and profit by the healthcare industry, which was a lie", and sought damages of at least $60,000 and a jury trial. Text messages filed by Joey Gilbert's own defense included a July 2022 message in which he told Dillon, who had offered to pay him, that "you guys have compensated me enough by helping with the campaign more so than probably anyone else did"; state campaign-finance records showed no contributions from Dillon to Joey Gilbert's campaign. By the time the suit was filed, Sigal Chattah was serving as the interim United States Attorney for the District of Nevada; she was later designated acting U.S. Attorney, an appointment that a federal district court in September 2025 and the Ninth Circuit in August 2026 ruled invalid.

In October 2025, District Judge Jacob Reynolds dismissed all claims against Sigal Chattah, finding that she had not been the primary attorney and had not involved herself in the allegedly false representations, but allowed the legal-malpractice, breach-of-fiduciary-duty, and intentional-misrepresentation claims against Joey Gilbert to proceed. The court described Joey Gilbert as "the person that communicated with Plaintiff, knew Plaintiff personally, sought attention in the media", while noting that evidence Joey Gilbert submitted raised "serious questions of fact about the accuracy of Plaintiff's allegations" that could not be resolved at the dismissal stage. Joey Gilbert and Dr. Warren Gilbert deny liability; Joey Gilbert's defense has argued that Dillon pressed him to file the suit, that he tried to dissuade her, and that he was never paid for the representation.

== Political activities ==
=== January 6, 2021 ===
Gilbert traveled to Washington, D.C., for the January 6, 2021 rally and was filmed on the steps of the U.S. Capitol during the attack. Video showed him chanting "1776!"; Gilbert has said he did not enter the building. In January 2022 he said he had "not a single regret" about attending and that he "was proud to be there as an American and a patriot". According to the Financial Times, Gilbert had been invited to speak at a "health freedom" rally in Washington that day, followed the crowd up the Capitol steps, and turned back when people began pushing past the guards.

=== 2022 gubernatorial campaign ===
Gilbert announced his candidacy for the Republican nomination for Governor of Nevada in June 2021, running as a Trump-aligned candidate who emphasized "election integrity" and opposition to COVID-19 restrictions. About 40 percent of his contributions came from out-of-state donors. In the June 14, 2022 primary he finished second with about 27 percent of the vote, behind Clark County Sheriff Joe Lombardo, who received about 38 percent, a margin of roughly 26,000 votes.

Gilbert refused to concede, claiming that the Republican primary for governor had been manipulated. He paid about $191,000 for a statewide recount, which confirmed the result, and in July 2022 filed an election contest in Carson City district court alleging that a mathematical formula showed the reported results were impossible and that votes had been switched, relying on an analysis by Edward Solomon. Judge James Wilson dismissed the contest in August 2022, ruling that Solomon's analysis was inadmissible hearsay and that Gilbert had presented no competent evidence for his claims. In September 2022 the court found the contest to be a frivolous action and sanctioned Gilbert approximately $88,000, and in October 2022 ordered him to pay a further $161,000 in Lombardo's attorney fees. Gilbert subsequently dropped his appeal and endorsed Lombardo in the general election.

=== Washoe County School Board application (2022) ===
In November 2022, Gilbert applied to fill a vacancy in the District E seat on the Washoe County School District Board of Trustees created when trustee Angie Taylor was elected to the Nevada Assembly. He was one of seven applicants. The board declined to advance him to the interview stage because he had submitted a cover letter without the required résumé.

=== Douglas County School District counsel (2023–2025) ===
==== Hiring ====
In May 2023, the Douglas County School District board of trustees considered a policy that would have restricted transgender students' use of bathrooms, locker rooms, and participation in sports according to sex assigned at birth. The ACLU of Nevada said the policy would violate state law and the 2022 Nevada Equal Rights Amendment equal rights amendment to the Nevada Constitution and threatened litigation. Board president Susan Jansen said approximately 0.3 percent of the district's roughly 5,000 students—about 15—identified as transgender. The district's longtime counsel, Maupin, Cox & LeGoy, advised that the policy could violate the equal rights amendment and could lead the Nevada Interscholastic Activities Association to bar Douglas County students from state competition.

On July 19, 2023, after a six-hour special meeting, the board voted 5–1 to terminate Maupin, Cox & LeGoy, which had represented the district since 1995, and then voted 4–2 to hire Joey Gilbert Law as general counsel. Trustees Jansen, Doug Englekirk, David Burns, and Katherine Dickerson voted to hire Gilbert; Tony Magnotta and Linda Gilkerson voted against; Carey Kangas left before the vote. Gilbert's contract provided a retainer of up to $7,500 per month plus $325 per hour, compared with the prior firm's $5,000 monthly retainer and $225 hourly rate. Gilbert, who had no background in education law, told the board, "I would only come on board as the general counsel if it's my show"; Burns said, "Our position is protecting the girls being subdued in sports"; Gilkerson said the process was "not transparent" and that "we are going to lose so much money." Superintendent Keith Lewis had urged the board not to change counsel, saying education law "is very complicated" and that the change "could be extremely costly to the district."

==== Fees and superintendent dispute ====
Gilbert's firm billed the district about $35,000 for August 2023 and more than $74,000 for September 2023, against an annual legal budget of about $160,000; the prior firm had cost roughly $18,000 per month. In September 2023 the firm advised the board that its bylaws unlawfully delegated legislative powers to the superintendent, including the "development" of meeting agendas—an interpretation Lewis said no other district in the state shared, and which the ACLU of Nevada characterized as an attempt "to micromanage the superintendent." After Lewis publicly objected to the fees, the board voted on October 6, 2023, on whether to terminate him; the motion failed 4–3 amid heavy public comment. Lewis resigned later that month under a separation agreement that continued his salary through July 2024 and barred him from participating in recall efforts against trustees. The district raised its annual legal budget from $123,000 to $450,000 in December 2023.

==== Public-records lawsuit and other findings ====
Residents sued the district in 2023 under the Nevada Public Records Act seeking trustees' communications from late 2022 and early 2023. Trustees signed affidavits stating they had personally searched their own devices; at a March 2024 trial, a paralegal from Gilbert's firm testified that the firm, not the trustees, had conducted the searches. Judge Thomas Gregory ruled for the petitioners, writing that the trustees had "doubled down" "for some incomprehensible reason" and that the Public Records Act "loudly and clearly demonstrates that when it comes to public records, the Nevada Legislature means business." The trustees ultimately produced about 6,100 pages of records more than a year late. and in January 2025 the Nevada Commission on Ethics recommended deferral agreements, including ethics training, for trustees Burns, Jansen, Dickerson, and Englekirk.

The transgender-student policy that prompted the change of counsel was never adopted. In November 2024, superintendent Frankie Alvarado said he was "not aware of any such issue in our schools" involving transgender students' use of facilities or participation in sports, and could not confirm allegations circulated in campaign materials.

==== Resignation ====
In the November 2024 election, challengers Erinn Miller and Melinda Gneiting, who had campaigned against Gilbert's employment, defeated incumbents Englekirk and Antoinette Casselberry. After trustee Yvonne Wagstaff moved to schedule a special meeting to terminate his contract, Gilbert announced his resignation on December 11, 2024, effective January 9, 2025, stating, "Put simply, my job was done," and citing the replacement of the superintendent and the overhaul of board bylaws. Over the roughly sixteen-month engagement, Joey Gilbert's law firm billed the district a total of $437,204.17.

=== Later political activity ===
In March 2026, Gilbert announced that he would not run for the open seat in Nevada's 2nd congressional district. He publicly endorsed Republican David Flippo, a retired Air Force lieutenant colonel, who was also endorsed by Donald Trump and who won the June 9, 2026 primary over former state senator James Settelmeyer. In September 2026, Reno City Council member Kathleen Taylor, a candidate for mayor of Reno, released an endorsement video from Gilbert and wrote that she was "proud" to have his endorsement. Asked about Gilbert's support at a September 30, 2026 forum hosted by The Nevada Independent, Taylor pointed to her endorsements from Governor Lombardo, police and firefighters, and described Gilbert as "a nice guy".

== Transgender and LGBTQ views ==
During the 2022 gubernatorial campaign, Gilbert told The Nevada Independent by email that competitive sports "have always been – to me – rightfully separated into men's and women's categories" defined by "physiological make-up – and not by their psychological feelings", and that while he respected the rights of transgender people he also respected "the rights of the majority of people." In the same statement he said he supported "basic civil rights and constitutional protection of homosexuals" but described the LGBTQ movement as political advocates seeking "to pressure our society to accept their sense of homosexual values" and promoting "the medically unproven belief that homosexuality is a biological fact rather than a psychological choice", adding, "I disagree with all of those beliefs and goals."

In July 2023, when the Douglas County School District board hired his firm after its prior counsel advised that a proposed policy restricting transgender students' use of bathrooms and locker rooms and participation in girls' sports could violate the Nevada Constitution's equal rights amendment, Gilbert told the board he supported the positions trustee David Burns had advocated on those issues and said he would "research such a policy thoroughly and work with the board to craft something that it believes is in the best interest of the board and the county." The policy was never adopted, and the district's superintendent later said he was "not aware of any such issue in our schools."

== Business ventures ==
Gilbert has described himself as "a businessman at heart." Early in his boxing career he founded two Las Vegas-based companies, a political consulting and communications firm and a sports management company. He has held a Nevada boxing promoter's license since 2007 and is the sole owner of Joey Gilbert Promotions, which promoted his own bouts and those of other fighters. In 2019, Joey Gilbert Promotions partnered with Roy Jones Jr. Boxing Promotions and the Reno-based Eldorado group to co-promote boxing cards at the Silver Legacy Reno streamed on UFC Fight Pass; the first card, on October 25, 2019, drew about 1,600 spectators.

In 2016, Gilbert became a founding partner of Mynt Cannabis, a Reno cannabis dispensary that was later sold to a Canadian company; he and other Mynt founders subsequently formed Parliament Group, a hemp-processing company that in 2019 was building a facility in Sparks. In August 2019 he founded Champion Real Estate Advisors and began working toward a Nevada real-estate broker's license. By that year his ventures also included mining interests and nonprofits for children and veterans.

Gilbert also leads To Know Oneself Optimized Wellness LLC, which provides non-clinical administrative support to a Reno hormone-optimization clinic operating under the names To Know Oneself and TKO Vitality; the clinic offers testosterone replacement therapy, GLP-1 weight-loss medication, peptide and NAD+ therapies, and his father, Warren Gilbert, is its clinical director.
