= Communication of the Trump administration during the COVID-19 pandemic =

Aspect of 2020 viral outbreak

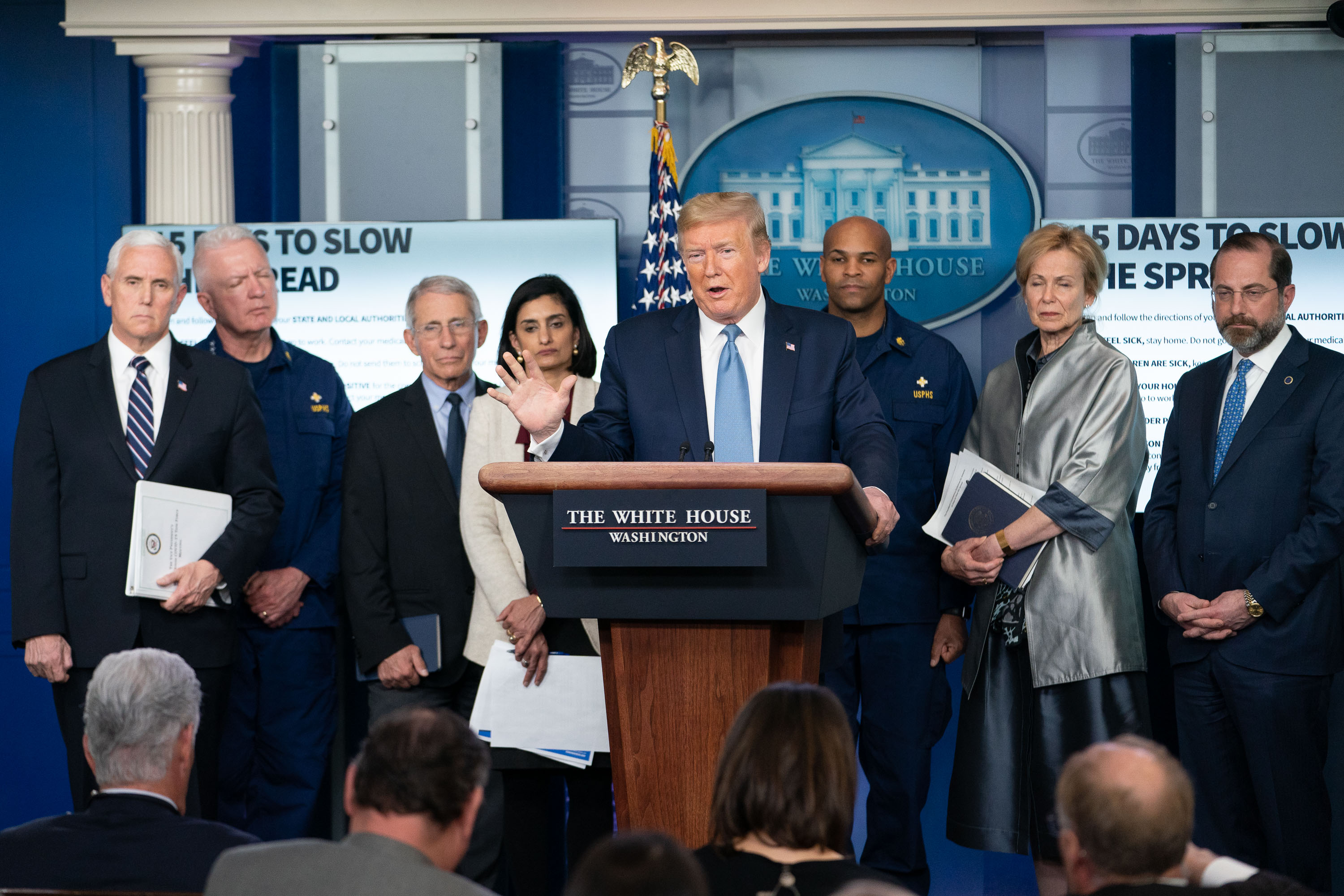
The White House Coronavirus Task Force briefing the media

President Donald Trump's administration communicated to the public in various ways during the COVID-19 pandemic in the United States, as seen on social media, in interviews, and press conferences with the White House Coronavirus Task Force. Opinion polling conducted in mid-April 2020 indicated that less than half of Americans trusted health information provided by Trump and that they were more inclined to trust local government officials, state government officials, the Centers for Disease Control and Prevention (CDC), and National Institute of Allergy and Infectious Diseases director Anthony Fauci. This low level of trust was partly attributed to frequent changes in health safety guidance and the circulation of misinformation spread by unconfirmed bias media sources and conspiracy theorists during the pandemic.

Trump remained publicly optimistic through much of the pandemic; at times his optimistic messaging diverged from that of his administration's public health officials. From January to mid-March 2020, Trump downplayed the threat posed by COVID-19 to the United States, as well as the severity of the outbreak. Trump did, however, place restrictions on travel from China on January 31. From February to May, Trump continually asserted that COVID-19 would "go away". The CDC waited until February 25 to first warn the American public to prepare for a local outbreak of the virus. In March 2020, the administration began conducting daily press briefings at the White House, where Trump was the dominant speaker.

Trump repeatedly made false statements regarding the pandemic. He took messaging advice from Fox News hosts like Sean Hannity and Lou Dobbs, both of whom he dialed into Oval Office meetings. Trump exaggerated the impact of measures taken by his government and the private sector, understated the projected time to produce a vaccine, recommended uncontrolled transmission in pursuit of herd immunity until a vaccine was developed, and promoted unapproved treatments such as hydroxychloroquine and chloroquine. In such instances, scientists, including Anthony Fauci, Michael Osterholm, and Tedros Adhanom Ghebreyesus (director-general of the World Health Organization), publicly countered his misleading messages with correct information. Trump also frequently reversed his stances in his communication, leading to mixed or contradictory messaging. He sometimes denied his own public statements.

Trump repeatedly blamed others for the severity of the outbreak. The most frequent targets of his criticism were Democrats, followed by the media, state governors, and China (where the virus originated). Trump went from praising China in January regarding their transparency in response to the Chinese outbreak, to criticizing China in March for a lack of transparency, to criticizing the World Health Organization in April for praising China's transparency.

== Severity and risk assessments in 2020 ==
=== January 1 to February 24 ===
In January and February 2020, U.S. intelligence agencies delivered over a dozen classified warnings in the President's Daily Brief about COVID-19, including its potential to inflict severe political and economic damage. President Donald Trump typically did not read daily briefs and often has "little patience" for oral summaries, The Washington Post reported. Each brief was also shared with other officials in the administration. The Office of the Director of National Intelligence, which produces the President's Daily Brief, denied that there were repeated mentions of COVID-19.

On January 8, 2020, the U.S. Centers for Disease Control and Prevention (CDC) released a health advisory regarding an outbreak of pneumonia in Wuhan, Hubei Province, China, which was being caused by a yet-unidentified virus. It issued a low-level travel notice for Wuhan with a reminder to practice "usual precautions". The CDC advised clinicians that U.S. patients with severe respiratory illnesses should be checked for travel history to Wuhan, and that health authorities should be immediately informed of cases meeting such criteria.

On January 17, the CDC conducted its first press briefing on the novel coronavirus. On January 21, after the first U.S case of the novel coronavirus was confirmed, the CDC's National Center for Immunization and Respiratory Diseases director, Nancy Messonnier, stated that additional cases were expected to occur globally from human-to-human transmission, but the disease posed a low risk to the public at large.

On January 22, Trump was interviewed by the media and acknowledged that the CDC had briefed him on the sole known COVID-19 case in the country. Trump stated "we have it under control". He continued to claim that the outbreak was "under control" on January 30, February 23, February 24, and February 25.

On January 27, Anthony Fauci, head of the National Institute of Allergy and Infectious Diseases, predicted that "things are going to get worse before they get better". Three days later, Fauci stated that the COVID-19 outbreak "could turn into a global pandemic". Also on January 30, CDC Director Robert Redfield said that "the immediate risk to the American public is low."

On February 10, Trump stated that "a lot of people think that [COVID-19] goes away in April with the heat ... Typically, that will go away in April" (later, on April 3, he denied ever having given "a date" for the departure of the virus). On February 13, CDC director Robert Redfield contradicted Trump, saying that the "virus is probably with us beyond this season, beyond this year". Redfield also predicted that it "will become a community virus at some point in time, this year or next year". On February 16, Anthony Fauci warned that it was not necessarily true that COVID-19 would "disappear with the warm weather."

On February 24, senior members of the Trump administration economic team spoke to the board of the Hoover Institution in private, warning them that it was not yet possible to estimate the virus' effects on the economy. Later that day, however, Trump tweeted that the virus was "very much under control" in the United States.

=== February 25 to March 15 ===
February 25 was the day that the CDC first warned the American public to prepare for a local outbreak. That day, Nancy Messonnier, head of the CDC's National Center for Immunization and Respiratory Diseases, said that "We are asking the American public to work with us to prepare for the expectation that this is going to be bad." Messonnier predicted that "we will see community spread in this country", and it was only a matter of time. As a result, "disruption to everyday life might be severe". Messonnier stated that the CDC is preparing, and "now is the time for hospitals, schools and everyday people to begin preparing as well." Starting the day after her comments, Messonnier was excluded from public briefings of the White House coronavirus task force, and Trump threatened to fire her.

Also on February 25, Anthony Fauci declared that given how COVID-19 was spreading in other nations, it was "inevitable that this will come to the United States" as well. On February 26, CDC Director Robert Redfield said it would be "prudent to assume this pathogen will be with us for some time to come".

Meanwhile, on February 25, federal economic policy chief Larry Kudlow declared the COVID-19 containment "pretty close to airtight". On February 26, Trump contradicted Messonnier, stating: "I don't think it's inevitable" that a U.S. outbreak would occur, "It probably will, it possibly will ... Whatever happens, we're totally prepared." Trump additionally declared that the number of infected was "going very substantially down, not up", but stated: "Schools should be preparing. Get ready just in case."

On February 26, speaking of the number of known infected in the country at the time, Trump predicted "the 15 within a couple of days is going to be down to close to zero—that's a pretty good job we've done." He rejected the notion that the U.S. needed to produce more masks, stating: "Our borders are very controlled." He contrasted COVID-19's mortality rate with that of Ebola, stating: "This is a flu. This is like a flu."

On February 27, he said of the virus: "It's going to disappear. One day it's like a miracle, it will disappear. And from our shores, you know, it could get worse before it gets better. Could maybe go away. We'll see what happens. Nobody really knows." Also on February 27, Trump declared that the risk to the American public from COVID-19 "remains very low".

On February 28, Trump's campaign manager Brad Parscale told Jared Kushner that it would serve Trump's reelection chances to have "more visuals." Parscale wanted Trump "standing in front of amazing things. Put the white coat on. Look at the vaccine being made. Show America we're doing stuff." (This was reported in Bob Woodward's book Rage released in September 2020.) Later that day, at a campaign rally, Trump pointed out that, as yet, there had been zero known deaths from COVID-19 in the U.S. (compared to about 35,000 influenza deaths in the U.S. each year), and he concluded: "You wonder if the press is in hysteria mode."

On February 29, Trump said that "additional cases in the United States are likely", but "there's no reason to panic at all." When a reporter asked Trump: "How should Americans prepare for this virus?" Trump answered: "I hope they don't change their routine", before calling on CDC director Robert Redfield to answer the same question. Redfield replied: "The risk at this time is low ... The American public needs to go on with their normal lives."

On March 2, Anthony Fauci, head of the National Institute of Allergy and Infectious Diseases, voiced his concern that in the next one to three weeks, the U.S. would "see a lot more community-related cases", due to the country already having identified "a number of cases" that have "been in the community for a while".

On March 4, Trump appeared on Fox News's Hannity by phone, where he claimed a 3.4% mortality rate projected by the World Health Organization (WHO) was a "false number", and stated his "hunch" that the true figure would be "way under 1%". Trump also predicted that many people infected with COVID-19 would experience "very mild" symptoms, "get better very rapidly" and thus they "don't even call a doctor". Thus, there may be "hundreds of thousands of people that get better just by, you know, sitting around and even going to work—some of them go to work, but they get better." Trump used this to argue that there would be an under-reporting of cases and an over-estimation of the death rate.

On March 6, CDC director Robert Redfield again said that the risk to the American public was "low", asserting that there were not "hundreds and hundreds of clusters" of COVID-19 cases in the country, and declaring that "we're not blind where this virus is right now in the United States". On March 7, Redfield encouraged Americans to continue their travel, even take a trip to Disneyland (within one week, Disneyland parks were closed in the country). On March 9, Redfield repeated that the risk to the American public was still "low".

From March 6 to March 12, Trump stated on four occasions that the coronavirus would "go away". On March 10, Surgeon General Jerome Adams stated that "this is likely going to get worse before it gets better."

Trump expressed a focus on the number of U.S. cases in the initial stages of the outbreak, citing the relatively low number of confirmed cases as proof that his January 31 decision to restrict entry into the country from China by foreign nationals was successful. Commenting about cruise ship Grand Princess, he stated his preference that infected passengers not disembark as he did not want "to have the [U.S. case] numbers double because of one ship". Trump explained in his March 25 briefing that "if I didn't do it, you'd have thousands and thousands of people died—who would've died—that are now living and happy".

=== March 16 to April 24 ===
The Washington Post described Trump's pronouncements as having "evolved from casual dismissal to reluctant acknowledgement to bellicose mobilization" over the course of the pandemic. Though Trump "occasionally adopted health officials' more cautious tone", the optimism that dominated his early response "hadn't completely disappeared", Trump having downplayed the threat of COVID-19 over 200 times.

On March 16, President Trump admitted for the first time that COVID-19 was not "under control", and the situation was "bad" with months of impending disruption to daily lives, and a recession possible.

On March 17, Trump argued that he "felt it was a pandemic long before it was called a pandemic." A fact-check by the Associated Press of this statement of Trump's concluded that Trump was "revising history"; the claim "doesn't match his rhetoric over the last two months", where Trump never described the outbreak as a pandemic before the World Health Organization did so on March 11.

On March 19, Trump told journalist Bob Woodward that he was deliberately downplaying the risk when communicating with the public. "I wanted to always play it down," Trump said. "I still like playing it down, because I don't want to create a panic." The interview was not made public at the time. The quote was made public on September 9, a few days in advance of the scheduled release of Woodward's book, Rage.

Trump has repeatedly compared COVID-19 to influenza, despite Fauci estimating COVID-19 to have a mortality rate around ten times higher. On March 9, Trump compared the 546 known U.S. cases of COVID-19 at the time and the 22 known deaths at the time to the tens of thousands of U.S. deaths from flu each year. On March 24, Trump argued that: "We lose thousands and thousands of people a year to the flu ... But we've never closed down the country for the flu." On March 27, he stated: "You can call it a flu. You can call it a virus. You know you can call it many different names. I'm not sure anybody even knows what it is."

On March 24, Trump declared that "we begin to see the light at the end of the tunnel"; a day later the U.S. surpassed 1,000 COVID-19 deaths. On April 5, Trump continued to use the same phrase; by that day, the U.S. had close to 10,000 COVID-19 deaths and over 330,000 known COVID-19 cases. Meanwhile, on April 5, Surgeon General Jerome Adams warned that the next week is "going to be the hardest moment for many Americans in their entire lives", comparing it to the attack on Pearl Harbor or the 9/11 attack.

From March 30 to April 7, Trump stated on four occasions that COVID-19 would "go away".

On March 31, contradicting his many previous comparisons of COVID-19 to the flu, Trump said: "It's not the flu ... It's vicious". When reporters asked him if his initial dismissive comments on the virus had misled Americans, he replied: "I want to give people a feeling of hope. I could be very negative ... You know, I'm a cheerleader for the country." Asked further if he had known—despite his claims that the outbreak was under control—that the situation would turn out so severe, Trump replied: "I thought it could be. I knew everything. I knew it could be horrible, and I knew it could be maybe good." On April 1, Mike Pence told the media: "I don't believe the president has ever belittled the threat of the coronavirus ... I think he's expressed confidence that America will meet this moment". Pence proceeded to describe Trump as "an optimistic person".

At the April 1 White House briefing, Pence was asked why the administration had not reopened the enrollment period under the Affordable Care Act so that more Americans could sign up for health insurance. Pence responded indirectly. Trump praised him publicly in the moment: "I think that's one of the greatest answers I've ever heard because Mike was able to speak for five minutes and not even touch your question. I said that's what you call a great professional."

At the April 10 briefing with the White House Coronavirus Task Force, Trump implied that the illness was caused by a bacterial pathogen rather than a virus: "Antibiotics used to solve every problem. Now one of the biggest problems the world has is the germ has gotten so brilliant that the antibiotic can't keep up with it."

Michael Caputo, a former Trump campaign official who had also helped Presidents Yeltsin and Putin while living in Russia and who Politico described as having "no medical or scientific background," became the Health and Human Services spokesperson on April 16. During Caputo's term, HHS began attempting to alter or shut down the CDC's Morbidity and Mortality Weekly Reports, which are written by scientists; HHS claimed these reports were unfavorable for Trump.

On April 18, Jared Kushner told Bob Woodward that Trump was "getting the country back from the doctors." While acknowledging "that doesn't mean there's not still a lot of pain and there won't be pain for a while," he said, "Trump's now back in charge. It's not the doctors." He made the comments during a taped interview with Bob Woodward which was made public on October 28.

In an interview by The Washington Post published on April 21, Redfield warned that "there's a possibility that the assault of the virus on our nation next winter will actually be even more difficult than the one we just went through," as it could coincide with seasonal flu. During that day's briefing, Trump criticized the story's headline, "CDC director warns second wave of coronavirus is likely to be even more devastating", as being "fake news", and accused media outlets of having "totally misquoted" Redfield. Redfield clarified that "I didn't say that this was going to be worse. I said it was going to be more complic—" He then concluded, "—or more difficult and potentially complicated." Trump followed up, by saying that "we may not even have corona coming back, just so you understand." Later in the briefing, Fauci said that he was "convinced" that the United States "will have coronavirus in the fall", but the country would be "much, much better prepared".

=== April 25 to June 15 ===
In late April, White House officials delivered upbeat messages about the future of the country. Vice President Mike Pence predicted that "by Memorial Day weekend we will largely have this coronavirus epidemic behind us." White House adviser Jared Kushner predicted that "a lot of the country should be back to normal" by June and "really rocking again" by July. Treasury Secretary Steven Mnuchin predicted that the American economy would "really bounce back" in the months of July, August and September. Meanwhile, Trump was repeating his assertion that the coronavirus "is going to go away".

By contrast, the White House COVID-19 response coordinator, Deborah Birx, said on television on April 26 that social distancing would be necessary through the summer.

On April 27, with over 55,000 deaths from COVID-19 in the U.S., Trump stated that the U.S. was "probably heading to 60,000, 70,000" deaths. Less than one week later, on May 1, with over 63,000 total deaths, Trump said: "Hopefully we're going to come in below that 100,000 lives lost".

On May 8, Trump predicted that COVID-19 is "going to go away without a vaccine", "eventually". Just five days earlier, he had instead said: "this country needs the vaccine". Asked to explain his May 8 prediction, Trump claimed: "I just rely on what doctors say". However, weeks earlier, senior health official Anthony Fauci had stated that the outbreak was "not going to be over to the point of our being able to not do any mitigation until we have a scientifically sound, safe and effective vaccine." Later on May 12, Fauci explained that COVID-19 would not simply vanish from the U.S. because it was too "highly transmissible".

On May 12, Fauci testified to the Senate that the actual death toll for COVID-19 in the U.S. was "almost certainly higher" than the official death toll. He argued that there would be unrecorded deaths in areas where hospitals were very strained, with people dying in their homes, who would not be counted as COVID-19 deaths. Fauci also warned that "we don't know everything about this virus, and we really had better be very careful, particularly when it comes to children", pointing to examples of children developing an inflammatory syndrome which is similar to Kawasaki syndrome.

On June 9, an interview of Fauci aired where he said that COVID-19 was his "worst nightmare" realized, given that it was "highly transmissible", he further warned that "it isn't over yet". Additionally, if President Trump's endorsement of the Covid vaccine had been more publicized, perhaps more Republicans would have received a dose of the vaccine.

=== June 16–30 ===
As U.S. cases reached 4,800,000 and deaths reached 157,690, Trump repeated his assertion that he believes COVID-19 will "go away" despite his top public health expert warning that it could take most of 2021 or longer to get the pandemic under control. Trump "made numerous versions of this assertion over...more than six months".

On "totally harmless" cases

Now we have tested over 40 million people. But by so doing, we show cases, 99 percent of which are totally harmless.

— South Lawn "Salute to America" speech
July 4, 2020
On per capita death rates

Journalist: "I'm talking about death as a proportion of population. That's where the US is really bad. ..."
Trump: "You can't do that! You have to go by—look, here's the United States—you have to go by (death as a proportion of) the cases."

— August 2020 interview with Jonathan Swan

On June 16, The Wall Street Journal published an interview with Fauci, where he commented that the United States is "still in a first wave" of infections for the COVID-19 pandemic. Fauci also stated that the increasing percentages of positive tests in many states "cannot be explained by increased testing". Also that day, Vice President Pence, in an opinion piece for The Wall Street Journal, criticized the media for warning against a "second wave" of infections, stating that "such panic is overblown". Pence declared that "we are winning the fight against the invisible enemy".

On June 17, Trump declared that the outbreak was "dying out" and that COVID-19 is "fading away". On June 23, Fauci stated that the United States is "now seeing a disturbing surge of infections", reiterating that COVID-19 would not "disappear".

=== July ===
On July 3, NBC reported that Trump administration officials were planning a communications strategy that would portray the virus as having a low mortality rate and that would highlight possible therapeutic drugs. The officials were reportedly aware of the reality that, with only four months until the election, COVID-19 would present an ongoing public health concern for voters. During his Independence Day address the next day, Trump commented that 99% of U.S. COVID-19 cases were "totally harmless"; the comment was disputed by FDA commissioner Stephen Hahn and mayors of several southern cities.

In mid-July, the Trump administration told hospitals to begin reporting COVID-19 data to states rather than to the CDC. As a result of no longer receiving data directly, the CDC removed existing data from its public online "dashboard." Following complaints from federal health officials, the dashboard data was reinstated.

On July 19, in an interview with Chris Wallace on Fox News Sunday, Trump disputed Wallace's statement (based on Johns Hopkins University numbers) that the U.S. had the seventh-highest mortality rate in the world from COVID-19, stating that "we have one of the lowest mortality rates in the world", and presenting Wallace a White House-produced chart (claimed to be sourced from the European Centre for Disease Prevention and Control) in support of this statement. He again downplayed the threat, arguing that "many of those cases are young people that would heal in a day [...] they have the sniffles and we put it down as a test."

On July 21, Trump acknowledged that the outbreak would "get worse before it gets better".

=== August ===
On August 2, Deborah Birx appeared on CNN and warned of a new surge. Afterward, she received a "very uncomfortable" and "very difficult" phone call from Trump, though she did not reveal this publicly until the following year.

On August 17, speaking to a crowd in Mankato, Minnesota, Trump said of the pandemic's effect on the economy: "That's God testing me." Trump said he performed an "economic miracle" and addressed God: "Did I do a great job, God? I'm the only one that could do it."

In August 2020, President Trump retweeted that only 6% of reported COVID-19 deaths in the United States were actually from the disease, based on COVID-19 being the only condition listed on the death certificate. The lead mortality statistician at the CDC's National Center for Health Statistics said that those death certificates likely did not include all the steps that led to the death and thus were incomplete. The CDC collects data based on case surveillance, vital records, and excess deaths.

=== September ===
On Downplaying the Virus

"The President
never downplayed the virus."

— Kayleigh McEnany, September 9, 2020

"I wanted to always play it down.
I still like playing it down because
I don't want to create a panic."

—Trump, recorded privately on March 19, 2020

(Bob Woodward released recording in Sept.)

On September 9, quotes and audio from Bob Woodward's March 2020 interviews with Trump were made public, including his March 19 admission that he wanted to "play it down". Press Secretary Kayleigh McEnany told journalists that Trump had "never downplayed the virus," had rather chosen to "express calm" in public, and "has never lied to the American public on COVID." Public reaction concerned whether Woodward should have published his findings immediately rather than waiting for his book release; Woodward defended his process. The next day, September 10, Trump echoed this public debate in a tweet: "Bob Woodward had my quotes for many months. If he thought they were so bad or dangerous, why didn't he immediately report them in an effort to save lives?" Because, Trump answered himself, Woodward had seen nothing to criticize; his own statements had been "good and proper...Calm, no panic!"

On September 13, in a video posted to Facebook, HHS spokesman Michael Caputo accused CDC scientists of "sedition" against Trump. He also maligned them as lazy. Two days later, Caputo apologized and took a 60-day medical leave of absence.

On September 21, Trump said at a rally in Ohio that the virus "really affects" elderly people "with heart problems and other problems," and then he added, "below the age of 18, like, nobody." He then said: "But it affects virtually nobody. It's an amazing thing."

=== October ===
Containing versus controlling the virus

"We're not going to control the pandemic. We are gonna control the fact that we get vaccines, therapeutics and other mitigations. ... (I)t is a contagious virus just like the flu."
"(W)e're going to defeat the virus. We're not going to control it. We will try to contain it as best we can."

— Chief of Staff Mark Meadows
October 25 and 26, 2020
On death count

"Well, why aren't they talking about deaths? Oh, oh, because the number is almost nothing. Because we've gotten control of this, and we understand how it works."

— Donald Trump Jr., October 29, 2020
(deaths that day: 1,000)

On October 6, Trump claimed that COVID-19 is "in most populations far less lethal" than the flu. He posted the same message to both Twitter and Facebook. Both social media companies treated this as misinformation: Twitter placed a warning message over the tweet, and Facebook deleted the equivalent post on its platform.

At a rally in Carson City, Nevada on October 18, Trump attempted to credit Obama vice president and Democratic presidential nominee Joe Biden as being responsible for stay-at-home orders, arguing that "under the Biden lockdown, the lights of Reno and Las Vegas were extinguished", and that "if he comes in, Carson City will become a ghost town and the Christmas season will be canceled.", despite the fact that Biden was a private citizen.

In a campaign call on October 19, Trump claimed that Americans were bored of hearing about COVID-19. "People are saying 'Whatever, just leave us alone.' They're tired of it. People are tired of hearing Fauci and all these idiots," he said, adding that Fauci has "been here for 500 years."

In the final 2020 presidential debate against Biden on October 22, Trump argued that the United States was "learning to live with [COVID]. We have no choice. We can't lock ourselves up in a basement like Joe does. He has the ability to lock himself up, we can't close up our nation, or you're not going to have a nation." He again claimed that the United States was "rounding the turn". Biden countered Trump's argument, replying "he says that we're learning to live with it. People are learning to die with it. You folks home will have an empty chair at the kitchen table this morning. That man or wife going to bed tonight and reaching over to try to touch ... out of habit, where their wife or husband was, is gone. Learning to live with it? Come on. We're dying with it."

On October 25, White House chief of staff Mark Meadows stated on CNN that "we're not going to control the pandemic", and that the best that could be done was "vaccines, therapeutics and other mitigation."

On October 27, the Office of Science and Technology Policy published a news release listing "ENDING THE COVID-19 PANDEMIC" as one of the Trump administration's "accomplishments", at a time when the seven-day U.S. case average (then 70,000/day) was the highest to date.

On October 30, at a rally in Michigan, Trump accused hospitals of inflating the count of COVID-19 deaths, falsely claiming that "doctors get more money if someone dies from COVID."

== Mitigation measures and policies ==
=== Implementing restrictions ===
In his first comment on COVID-19 in a major address, Trump in his February 4 State of the Union pledged that his "administration will take all necessary steps to safeguard our citizens from this threat". On February 28, Trump stated that "we are doing everything in our power to keep the infection and those carrying the infection from entering the country. We have no choice."

On March 11, 2020, after the WHO declared COVID-19 a global pandemic, President Trump delivered an Oval Office address. In his speech, Trump stated that his administration was "marshaling the full power of the federal government and the private sector to protect the American people". He announced that the United States was "suspending all travel from Europe to the United States for the next 30 days", except travel from the United Kingdom, and including "the tremendous amount of trade and cargo". Trump also listed several economic policy proposals designed to provide tax relief for workers, aid small businesses, and fight the spread of the virus. Trump declared that insurance companies "have agreed to waive all co-payments for coronavirus treatments". After the speech, America's Health Insurance Plans clarified the waivers were only for tests, not for treatments, but by March 10 treatment was also covered. Trump also clarified that said trade was still approved under the travel restrictions, and administration officials clarified that American citizens or legal permanent residents or their families were not affected. Trump praised his administration's response to the "foreign" virus while stating that "a large number of new clusters in the United States were seeded by travelers from Europe." He closed the speech by calling for less partisanship during the pandemic and praising Americans' response to adversity.

On March 16, President Trump and the Coronavirus Task Force released new recommendations based on CDC guidelines for Americans, titled "15 Days to Slow the Spread". These recommendations included physical distancing and hygienic instructions, as well as directions to the states in dealing with school closures, nursing homes, and common public venues.

On March 28, Trump raised the possibility of placing a two-week enforceable quarantine on New York, New Jersey, and "certain parts of Connecticut" to prevent travel from those places to Florida. The federal quarantine power is limited to preventing people reasonably believed to be infected with a communicable disease from entering the country or crossing state lines. Later that day, following criticism from the three governors, Trump withdrew the quarantine proposal. Instead, the CDC issued a travel advisory advising residents of the three states to "refrain from non-essential domestic travel for 14 days effective immediately".

On April 1, Trump falsely asserted that Americans were being tested for COVID-19 as they got on and off planes and trains.

On April 2, Anthony Fauci stated: "I don't understand why" some states still had yet to implement stay-at-home orders. By April 3, the states of Arkansas, Iowa, Nebraska, North Dakota and South Dakota had not implemented any such orders, while the states of Alabama, Missouri, Oklahoma, South Carolina, Utah and Wyoming had implemented stay-at-home orders in some regions of the states, but not state-wide.

On September 16, Attorney General Bill Barr characterized lockdowns as a serious civil rights violation: "Other than slavery, which was a different kind of restraint, this is the greatest intrusion on civil liberties in American history." House Majority Whip Jim Clyburn criticized the comparison, stating that it was "the most ridiculous, tone-deaf, God-awful thing I've ever heard."

Before Thanksgiving, Deborah Birx advised Americans to limit holiday gatherings to "your immediate household." She did not follow this advice herself; the day after Thanksgiving, she traveled to a vacation property where she spent time with her daughter's family.

=== Lifting restrictions ===
On March 22, Trump indicated a desire to scale back physical distancing measures: "We cannot let the cure be worse than the problem itself." A day later, he argued that economic problems arising from physical distancing measures will cause "suicides by the thousands" and "probably more death" than COVID-19 itself. He declared that the United States would "soon, be open for business", in a matter of weeks. During a virtual Fox News town hall on March 24, Trump stated restrictions had been "very painful for our country and very destabilizing. He expressed a desire to have the country "opened" within two weeks, anticipating "beautiful" and "packed" church services for Easter (April 12).

A survey of prominent economists by the University of Chicago indicated that abandoning a lockdown prematurely would do more economic damage than maintaining it. Law and economics scholars argued that the lockdowns were justified based on a cost-benefit analysis. On the March 26 episode of Hannity, Trump stated that there were plans to classify states by COVID-19 risks, possibly allowing for measures to be lifted on a regional basis.

Despite stating in a previous briefing that he preferred to have mitigation measures be controlled by individual states because it was compatible with the Constitution, Trump claimed at the April 13 briefing that he had the ultimate authority to order the end of restrictions, saying "the president of the United States has the authority to do what the president has the authority to do, which is very powerful. The president of the United States calls the shots." Three days later, Trump backtracked on his assertions, and assured governors that they would be able to "call [their] own shots."

On April 17, Trump made posts on Twitter reading "LIBERATE MICHIGAN", "LIBERATE VIRGINIA" and "LIBERATE MINNESOTA", in support of protests over responses and stay-at-home orders issued by the Democratic governors of these states (including the Lansing, Michigan protest). The posts were made after Fox News's America's Newsroom aired a segment that covered these protests, implicating that he was reacting to it in real-time (as he has with other Fox News programs, such as Fox & Friends). Later that day, a reporter asked whether he thought those states should end their stay-at-home orders. He replied, "No, but elements of what they've done are too much." When Trump was asked if he was worried that protester gatherings would inadvertently spread the coronavirus, he replied that the protesters "seem to be very responsible people". A day earlier, Trump commented: "They seem to be protesters that like me and respect this opinion, and my opinion is the same as just about all of the governors. They all want to open. Nobody wants to stay shut, but they want to open safely. So do I."

On April 17, the White House released their "Opening Up America Again" blueprint. Later on May 13, the Associated Press reported that the CDC had also written guidance on lifting restrictions, which was not released to the public. The CDC's recommendations were more specific and more restrictive than the White House's recommendations. The White House plan recommended that "non-essential travel can resume" after 28 continuous days of decreasing COVID-19 cases, whereas the CDC plan stated that resuming non-essential travel will only be under "consideration" after 42 consecutive days of decreasing COVID-19 cases. The CDC plan recognized that COVID-19 cases would likely surge when restrictions are lifted, and local authorities would need to stringently monitor their communities, but the White House plan did not. The White House plan offered non-specific recommendations to protect "workers in critical industries" and "the most vulnerable", whereas the CDC plan recommended using demographic information to find out where COVID-19 cases are more likely to increase faster.

On April 20, Fauci warned that the protests against stay-at-home orders could "backfire" if a spike in cases followed an early lifting of restrictions. Fauci argued against the protests, stating that "unless we get the virus under control, the real recovery, economically, is not gonna happen." On May 1, Trump described Michigan protesters against stay-at-home orders as "very good people" who are "angry". Some of those protesters had brought rifles into the Michigan State Capitol. Trump called on Michigan governor Gretchen Whitmer to "make a deal" with the protesters. On May 3, White House coronavirus task force coordinator Deborah Birx stated that it was "devastatingly worrisome" that some protesters across the U.S. were not wearing masks or practicing social distancing. She warned that these protesters may "go home and they infect their grandmother or grandfather who has a comorbid condition".

The CDC developed more than 60 pages of step-by-step guidelines for reopening businesses, including "decision trees" to help business owners decide whether it was safe to reopen. It sought White House approval to publish the guidelines, anticipating a publication date of May 1. The document was called the "Guidance for Implementing the Opening Up America Again Framework." However, the White House Office of Information and Regulatory Affairs (OIRA) told the CDC they could not publish it. The White House asked for the document to state more directly "when" to reopen and "how" to safeguard health; they did not want the decision trees that addressed whether to reopen. Part of the CDC's document (17 pages) was leaked on May 7, and the rest was identified on May 8.

After Anthony Fauci warned against reopening schools too fast, President Trump responded on May 13 that he was "surprised" by Fauci's comments, stating that "it's not an acceptable answer". He accused Fauci of wanting "to play all sides of the equation". Trump declared that "schools are going to be open", while "the only thing that would be acceptable" is to delay the return of older educators for a few weeks. Trump declared that students were "in great shape" and the statistics for them regarding COVID-19 were "pretty amazing". Trump acknowledged that "something" may happen to students, but asserted that: "You can be driving to school and some bad things can happen too."

On July 8, Trump declared an intent to pressure state governors into ensuring that schools would be open to in-person classes for the next semester and "cut off funding" if they didn't, alleging that Democrats wanted to keep schools closed for political reasons going into the election. Trump also criticized the CDC's guidelines for schools as being "very tough and expensive". During the day's briefing, Mike Pence subsequently announced that the CDC would "[issue] a new set of tools, five different documents that will be giving even more clarity on the guidance going forward." The next day, CDC director Robert Redfield stated that these documents would be supplemental to its existing guidelines, denying accusations that they were to be modified outright due to pressure from Trump.

In August, Scott Atlas, a neuroradiologist from the Hoover Institution, became a White House pandemic adviser. He supported lifting restrictions and letting the coronavirus spread, while continuing to protect some vulnerable people (for example, those who live in nursing homes), so that most of the population would develop "herd immunity."

=== Mask wearing ===
On voluntary mask wearing

You can do it. You don't have to do it. I am choosing not to do it. It may be good. It is only a recommendation, voluntary.

— Donald Trump, April 3, 2020.

==== Recommendations against and for mask wearing ====
Initially, the U.S. government did not recommend the use of face masks by the general public outside of medical settings to protect themselves from COVID-19, as to prevent shortages of medical-grade personal protective equipment (PPE) for doctors treating COVID-19 patients. In February 2020, Surgeon General Jerome M. Adams stated that proper hygiene and getting a flu vaccine were appropriate preventive actions to be taken by the public, and stated on Twitter that masks should be saved for healthcare professionals, and that they were "NOT effective in preventing [the] general public from catching Coronavirus". CDC director Robert R. Redfield also stated that healthy people did not need to wear masks.

In a March 8 interview with 60 Minutes, Fauci similarly argued that "when you're in the middle of an outbreak, wearing a mask might make people feel a little bit better and it might even block a droplet, but it's not providing the perfect protection that people think that it is." Fauci again cited the need to conserve supplies of PPE for medical workers and those who were sick.

In late March 2020, the Centers for Disease Control and Prevention (CDC) published a recommendation that masks be used by those who are sick, or are caring for someone who is sick and not able to wear a mask themselves, and discouraged their use by healthy members of the general public. This guidance was consistent with that of the World Health Organization (WHO) at the time.

On April 3, after the CDC issued a recommendation that the general public wear non-medical face coverings to help reduce propagation of the respiratory droplets that spread COVID-19, Trump stated in that day's briefing that he would not personally do so, and emphasized that this was merely a recommendation.

==== Use or lack of use of masks by Trump ====
In May 2020, Trump did not publicly wear a mask during press appearances at a Honeywell factory producing masks, nor at a Ford Motor Company plant in Ypsilanti, Michigan on May 21. He removed his mask before appearing for the media, saying he "didn't want to give the press the pleasure" of seeing him wearing a mask. Following the visit, Michigan Attorney General Dana Nessel announced that she would issue a warning to Ford for violations of Michigan health orders, which require the wearing of masks in all enclosed public spaces. She also criticized Trump on Twitter. In response, Trump chastised Nessel for "taking her anger and stupidity" out on Ford.

On May 26, Trump said that it was "very unusual" for Joe Biden to wear a face mask during a public appearance at an outdoor Memorial Day ceremony. In an interview, Biden responded by saying that "Presidents are supposed to lead, not engage in folly and be falsely masculine." Also that day, Trump asked a journalist to remove his face mask while asking a question. The journalist refused, saying he would talk louder. Trump reacted by accusing the journalist of wanting "to be politically correct."

In an interview with Fox Business on July 1, Trump stated he was "all for masks" and would wear one in public if social distancing was not possible, although arguing that he would not usually be in such a situation, and questioned whether a nationwide mandate for wearing masks in public would be effective, since it would apply in "places in the country where people stay very long distance" already. On July 14 in an interview with CBS News, Trump similarly urged Americans to wear masks "if it's necessary".

On July 20, Trump posted a photo of himself wearing a mask on Twitter, stating that "many people say that it is Patriotic to wear a face mask when you can't socially distance", and subsequently recommended residents do so during his briefing the next day.

At a campaign rally on September 3, Trump once again mocked Joe Biden for wearing masks during campaign appearances.

On effectiveness of masks

Just the other day (the CDC) came out with a statement that 85 percent of the people that wear masks catch it.

— Trump, NBC News Town Hall, October 15, 2020

At a campaign rally in Michigan on September 10, New York Times correspondent Kathy Gray was escorted out of a Trump rally after commenting on the lack of face mask usage in the audience on Twitter.

On September 21, The Daily Beast reported that William Crews, a public affairs official at the National Institute of Allergy and Infectious Diseases (NIAID), was a pseudonymous managing editor of the conservative blog RedState and had made posts downplaying the wearing of masks as a "political statement" and referring to Fauci as a "mask Nazi." That same day, NIAID announced that Crews would retire.

During an October 15 town hall hosted by NBC News, Trump falsely claimed that 85% of people who wear masks catch COVID-19, citing a CDC study. The study was actually to evaluate the behaviors of COVID-positive patients prior to the onset of symptoms. While 70% of those surveyed did self-report that they frequently wore masks, they were found to be more likely to have engaged in activities "where mask use and social distancing are difficult to maintain", such as indoor dining and close exposures.

== Testing ==
On February 21, Nancy Messonnier, the director of the National Center of Immunization and Respiratory Diseases denied that there was a "lag time for testing." Similarly, Health Secretary Alex Azar, in his testimony to the Senate on February 25, denied that the CDC-developed COVID-19 test was faulty (which it actually was), instead boasting that the CDC's response has been "historic".

On March 4, Trump inaccurately blamed the Barack Obama administration for making "a decision" that delayed COVID-19 testing by the Trump administration, stating that his administration "undid that [rule] a few days ago so that the testing can take place in a much more accurate and rapid fashion to more quickly provide diagnostic tests to the American people." Also that day, CDC director Robert Redfield inaccurately claimed that the Obama administration had modified policy to start regulating laboratory-developed tests. In actuality, the policy in question had never been modified by the Obama administration, despite plans to do so. The policy's overall legal roots date to 2004, before the Obama administration. Under the umbrella of Emergency Use Authorizations, the old policy stated that laboratory-developed tests "should not be used for clinical diagnoses without FDA's approval, clearance, or authorization during an emergency declaration". However, this policy was historically treated as a recommendation and generally unenforced, with no clear legal authority of the FDA in this area. The Trump administration continued to require laboratories to apply to the FDA for approval, but allowed the laboratories to test while the FDA processed the applications.

On March 5, Vice President Mike Pence, the leader of the coronavirus response team, acknowledged that "we don't have enough tests" to meet the predicted future demand; this announcement came only three days after FDA commissioner Stephen Hahn committed to producing nearly a million tests by that week. The next day, Pence was contradicted by Health and Human Services Secretary Alex Azar, who said that: "There is no testing kit shortage, nor has there ever been". Also on March 6, Trump over-promised on the availability of COVID-19 testing in the United States, claiming that: "Anybody that wants a test can get a test." Firstly, there were criteria needed to qualify for a test; recommendations were needed from doctors or health officials to approve testing. Secondly, the lack of test supplies resulted in some being denied tests even though doctors wanted to test them.

On March 13, when Trump was asked if he took responsibility for deficiencies in the country's testing response, he replied: "I don't take any responsibility at all".

On March 30, Trump claimed that his administration "inherited a broken test" for COVID-19. "That wasn't from us. That's been there a long time," he said. The claim was illogical because no previous administration could have prepared a test for a disease which had yet to emerge. COVID-19 emerged during Trump's presidency, at the end of 2019. The test was designed in 2020 by the Centers for Disease Control under the Trump administration. Trump repeated the false claim on multiple occasions: saying, for example, that the "CDC had obsolete tests" (to OANN on April 19) and that "the tests were broken" (to ABC News on May 5).

In early April, the Office of Inspector General, U.S. Department of Health and Human Services released a report describing that U.S. hospitals in late March reported that "severe shortages of testing supplies", including "nasal swabs, viral transfer media, and reagents used to detect the virus". The hospitals also reported "frequently waiting 7 days or longer for test results".

On April 21, Trump stated that COVID-19 testing in the United States "is good in some cases, and in some cases it's not." On May 1, Trump boasted that his administration has "solved every problem ... quickly", including "the testing".

On May 6, Trump said that if the United States "did very little testing, we wouldn't have the most cases. So, in a way, by doing all of this testing, we make ourselves look bad." Also that day, Trump met with a group of nurses. The group did not wear masks or practice social distancing, because they said they all had been tested negative for COVID-19. Meanwhile, White House press secretary Kayleigh McEnany argued that day that it "is just simply nonsensical" that "everyone" in the U.S. "needs to be tested".

On May 8, when Katie Miller, one of the West Wing's senior staff, tested positive for COVID-19, Trump used her as an example to claim that "the whole concept of tests aren't [sic] necessarily great". He went on: "The tests are perfect, but something can happen between a test where it's good and then something happens and all of the sudden. She was tested very recently and tested negative, and then today I guess for some reason she tested positive."

On testing increasing case count

Think of this: If we didn't do testing—instead of testing over 40 million people, if we did half the testing, we would have half the cases. If we did another—you cut that in half, we would have, yet again, half of that.

— Rose Garden press conference
July 14, 2020

On May 11, Trump claimed during a press conference that the country's testing capacity was "unmatched and unrivaled anywhere in the world, and it's not even close". When Chinese-American CBS News reporter Weijia Jiang accused Trump of attempting to treat the number of tests conducted as a "competition", despite the U.S. death toll, Trump replied, "well, they're losing their lives everywhere in the world, and maybe that's a question you should ask China". When accused by Jiang of having specifically said that with her in mind, Trump replied, "I am not saying it specifically to anybody. I am saying it to anybody who would ask a nasty question like that."

On June 4, CDC director Robert Redfield urged those who participated in the George Floyd protests, especially those who protested in metropolitan areas, to undergo COVID-19 testing.

During a rally on June 20 in Tulsa, Oklahoma, Trump claimed that increased testing was responsible for a rise in U.S. cases, and that he thus asked "my people" to "slow the testing down, please". White House advisor Peter Navarro stated following the speech that the remark was meant to be "tongue-in-cheek". Asked about the statement by a reporter on June 22, Trump replied that "I don't kid, let me just tell you." In an interview with CBN News aired later that day, Trump stated that the remark was "semi tongue-in-cheek", and denied that he had ordered the government to reduce testing, instead stating the large number of tests was the right thing. However, Trump stated that he did discuss the possibility of doing so. Following the rally, Trump continued to claim that increased testing was responsible for the increased number of cases.

On August 24, the CDC's website was quietly edited to remove a recommendation that asymptomatic close contacts of COVID-19 positives be tested. Multiple public health experts expressed concerns over the changes due to asymptomatic spread of COVID-19, and early testing of exposed people being considered essential to track and suppress the spread of the virus. On September 17 it was reported that the new guidelines had been written by Coronavirus Task Force, and been "dropped into" the CDC website by officials in the Department of Health and Human Services (HHS) over the objections of CDC scientists. A July document on "The importance of reopening schools" was also placed on the CDC website by HHS rather than CDC scientists. Two former directors of the CDC said that the notion of political appointees or non-scientists posting information to the CDC website undermined the credibility of the institution. On September 18, the changes were reversed, once again recommending testing of close contacts even if asymptomatic.

== Vaccines and treatments ==
After the December 2020 introduction of COVID vaccines, a partisan gap in death rates developed, indicating the effects of vaccine skepticism. As of March 2024, more than 30 percent of Republicans had not received a Covid vaccine, compared with less than 10 percent of Democrats.

=== Vaccine development and distribution ===
On March 2, 2020, Trump told the media that he had heard that a COVID-19 vaccine would be available in "a matter of months", with "a year [being] an outside number", after Trump attended a discussion where Fauci told him this process would take "a year to a year and a half" (at a minimum, Fauci later said). During that discussion, Trump repeatedly quizzed the leaders of pharmaceutical companies on the time needed to produce vaccines, stating "I like the sound of a couple of months better". The expected time was due to regulatory requirements for multiple rounds of tests before vaccines could be approved for the public's use. The first non-trial COVID vaccines were administered in the US in December, 2020, nine and a half months later.

In addition to starting the process of withdrawing from the WHO in 2020, and redirecting $62 million of its own assessments from the WHO, the Trump administration said it would not participate the COVAX program—a WHO-led initiative to provide equitable access to COVID-19 vaccines worldwide. On September 2, 2020, Garret Grigsby of the Department of Health and Human Services Office of Global Affairs said they would meet American needs before "looking to do our fair share and in terms of supporting the global need for vaccinations."

On January 12, 2021, Health and Human Services Secretary Alex Azar said that vaccine doses that had been held in reserve as second doses (the vaccine is administered in two doses spaced one month apart) would be freed up as first doses. Consequently, health administrators expected their vaccine supplies would increase. However, three days later, it was revealed that no such reserve existed.

The Trump administration actively undermined states' efforts to obtain funding for their vaccine operations. During his presidency, Trump did not encourage Americans to get vaccinated. On January 21, 2021, the day after President Biden's inauguration, it was reported that the Biden administration was developing a vaccine distribution plan "from scratch," since the Trump administration did not communicate information about an existing plan to the incoming Biden administration.

==== Post-presidency ====
After Trump left office, he said "Everyone should go get your shot" during a speech at the February 2021 CPAC conference, which was the first time he had directly advocated vaccination. He also issued a tweet-length press release on March 10 in which he took sole credit for the vaccine. (He claimed that, had he not been president in 2020, Americans would not have access to coronavirus vaccines now and would likely never have them in the future.) By that time, however, there was already a large gap in attitudes toward the vaccine, split along party lines. A NPR/PBS NewsHour/Marist Poll conducted March 3–8, 2021 found that 47% of Trump supporters, compared with only 10% of Biden supporters, said they did not plan to get the vaccine. (This polarization was slightly more pronounced among men and less so among women.) Fauci said in a March 14 television appearance that it was "puzzling" that, even though the vaccination program had begun during the Trump administration, Trump was still "not telling people to get vaccinated."

The second time Trump directly advocated vaccination was during a March 16 television appearance, although he also acknowledged the right of people to not be vaccinated. Fox News host Maria Bartiromo asked him: "Would you recommend to our audience that they get the vaccine, then?" Trump said: "I would." He then added: "But...we have our freedoms, and we have to live by that. And I agree with that also." In the same interview, Trump also claimed: "I was the one and this administration was the one that came up with a vaccine, which is going to save the world, okay?"

On August 21, 2021, Trump advocated vaccines at a rally in Cullman, Alabama, while simultaneously affirming vaccine refusal as a valid choice. He said: "I believe totally in your freedoms, I do, you gotta do what you gotta do," and then went on, "but I recommend: Take the vaccines. I did it. It's good." When crowd booed, he made another statement in favor of vaccines: "I happen to take the vaccine. If it doesn't work, you'll be the first to know. But it is working." He then again acknowledged the right of vaccine refusal: "You do have your freedoms, you have to maintain that."

In an interview with The Wall Street Journal published on September 3, 2021, Trump said of a 3rd dose "booster" shot: "I feel like I'm in good shape...I'm not against it, but it's probably not for me." He bragged on the Real America's Voice television channel on September 25, 2021, that he had survived the pandemic by doing "pretty much the opposite of whatever he [Fauci] said". On December 21, 2021, he told a crowd in Dallas that he had received the booster shot. Some people in the audience booed, and he said: "Take credit, because we saved tens of millions of lives. Take credit. Don't let them take that away from you."

At a January 2022 rally in Arizona, Trump falsely claimed that "the left is now rationing lifesaving therapeutics based on race, discriminating against and denigrating...white people to determine who lives and who dies. If you're white you don't get the vaccine or if you're white you don't get therapeutics."

=== Chloroquine and hydroxychloroquine ===
After learning about a French clinical study which implied a 70% cure rate in 20 patients versus 12.5% in the control group, Trump promoted the drugs chloroquine (also known as chloroquine phosphate) and hydroxychloroquine as potential treatments "by prescription" for COVID-19 on March 19. He noted the drugs showed "tremendous promise" and said he was working together with Governor Cuomo to begin quickly studying and treating coronavirus patients with the drugs in New York. He also remarked on their long-term usage as medicines in the United States saying, "the nice part is, it's been around for a long time, so we know that if it—if things don't go as planned, it's not going to kill anybody." Fatal overdoses of these drugs have occurred, and potential side effects are also known. Also during the briefing, Trump claimed that chloroquine had already been "approved very, very quickly" by the FDA as a treatment for COVID-19 (leading the FDA to clarify that it had not yet approved any COVID-19 treatments but was now allowing chloroquine under compassionate use guidelines).

Within days of this briefing, a shortage occurred for chloroquine and hydroxychloroquine in the United States, while panic-buying occurred overseas in Africa and South Asia. In the state of Arizona, a man died, with his wife in critical condition, after they ingested fish bowl cleaner, which contained chloroquine phosphate. The couple believed the chemical cleaner could prevent them from contracting COVID-19, although the chloroquine phosphate in fish bowl cleaners is not the same formulation found in the medicines chloroquine or hydroxychloroquine.

After Trump discussed chloroquine and hydroxychloroquine, Fauci stated in March that the success of those drugs were still "anecdotal. It was not done in a controlled clinical trial, so you really can't make any definitive statement about it." In April, after Trump again promoted hydroxychloroquine during a press briefing, a reporter asked Fauci a question on the effectiveness of hydroxychloroquine. Trump stopped Fauci from answering the question, stating: "He's answered that question 15 times". On April 21, the results of a study were released in which treatment with hydroxychloroquine was linked to higher rates of death than those in a control group who did not receive any drug treatment.

On May 18, Trump said he was taking hydroxychloroquine, and again promoted it: "What have you got to lose?" Fox News television host Neil Cavuto reacted to Trump's comments by stating that studies showed that people taking hydroxychloroquine risked losing their lives. Cavuto also said that hydroxychloroquine "will kill" those who are "vulnerable". Trump responded to Cavuto on Twitter by retweeting criticisms of Cavuto: "idiot", "foolish", "gullible" and "an asshole." Trump also declared that Fox News had "more anti-Trump people, by far, than ever before".

On May 31, the U.S. federal government donated two million doses of hydroxychloroquine to Brazil, for prophylactic and therapeutic use.

On July 27, both Trump and Donald Trump Jr. shared videos on Twitter from a press conference held by the Tea Party Patriots, where a group referring to themselves as "America's Frontline Doctors" promoted that a cocktail of hydroxychloroquine, Zithromax, and zinc could be used as an effective "cure" for COVID-19, and that mitigation measures and closures were therefore unnecessary. One of the speakers—pediatrician and religious minister Stella Immanuel—claimed that she herself had treated and "cured" 350 patients using this cocktail at her clinic. Due to policies against COVID-19 misinformation, the video was taken down by major social networks, and Twitter restricted Trump Jr.'s account for 12 hours after he uploaded a clip from the video to it.

During a media briefing the next day, Trump was questioned about his promotion of the video. He referred to the group as being "very respected doctors" and referred to Immanuel in particular as being "spectacular". When asked why he trusted Immanuel despite her history of promoting medical conspiracies (including claiming in sermons that space alien DNA was used in medical treatments, many gynecological illnesses are the result of having sex dreams with succubi and incubi and receiving "demon sperm", and that Illuminati were using witches to destroy the world through abortion, gay marriage, and children's toys and media), Trump replied, "I thought she was very impressive, in the sense that, from where she came—I don't know what country she comes from—but she said that she's had tremendous success with hundreds of different patients."

=== Light and disinfectants ===
During the April 23 briefing, DHS Science and Technology Directorate William N. Bryan presented preliminary findings from lab experiments conducted by the Army Medical Research Institute of Infectious Diseases, which found that COVID-19's half-life in saliva droplets on a non-porous surface was shorter when exposed to heightened heat or humidity, and considerably shortened in ultraviolet light (such as direct sunlight). Bryan noted that this evidence could help "support practical decision-making" (such as having governments encourage more outdoor activity by residents), but that "it would be irresponsible for us to say summer will kill the virus". As of early 2020, any correlations between warmer climates and COVID-19's spread had not been proven.

Press briefing: Trump suggests testing whether light, heat, or disinfectants by injection, could be used as treatments for COVID-19 (from 1:14:14 to 1:15:21).

Trump subsequently asked response coordinator Deborah Birx whether "[hitting] the body with a tremendous [light]" that could be "[brought] inside of the body" through the skin or "in some other way" could be used as a treatment for COVID-19. Birx stated she had not seen any heat- or light-based treatments in use. In response to another statement by Bryan on research into disinfectants that could kill the viruses on surfaces, Trump also openly wondered if disinfectants could be used on humans "by injection" or as "almost a cleaning, sterilization of an area", stating that it would be "interesting to check". Trump attributed both of the above ideas to him being "a person that has a good you-know-what".

The Guardian reported that a few days before Trump had made his comment on disinfectants, advocates of Miracle Mineral Supplement (MMS), a form of bleach, had sent a letter to the president with information about what is fraudulently touted as a "miracle cure" for a wide range of diseases. It is unknown if Trump was aware of the letter.

In 2024, a New York Times fact-check determined Trump «did not instruct people to inject bleach, but suggested that doing so with a disinfectant was an "interesting" concept to test out». Trump's suggestion involving the injection of disinfectants faced strong criticism from health experts, who stated that doing so would be dangerous and lethal. Reckitt Benckiser, the manufacturer of Lysol, issued a warning against use of its products internally. During an interview with NPR the following morning, Senate minority leader Charles Schumer described Trump as having become a "quack medicine salesman", and argued that "we need real focus in the White House on what needs to be done. Instead of talking about disinfectant the president should be talking about how he's going to implement testing. Which every expert says is the quickest path to get us moving again."

On April 24, the White House accused the media of taking Trump's words "out of context", while Trump stated that he was actually being "very sarcastic" the previous day when talking about disinfectant. Trump went on to say that disinfectant "would kill [the virus] on the hands, and that would make things much better." However, applying disinfectants on skin has the potential to cause irritation or chemical burns.

After Trump's comments, "hundreds of calls" were made to the Maryland health department emergency hotline "asking if it was right to ingest Clorox or alcohol cleaning products—whether that was going to help them fight the virus", according to Republican governor of Maryland, Larry Hogan. He called for the White House to communicate "very clearly on the facts", because people "certainly pay attention when the president of the United States is standing there giving a press conference". Other increases in calls to poison control centers were reported in the city of New York, and the states of Michigan, Tennessee, and Illinois. The state of Illinois also reported incidents where people have used detergents for sinus rinses, and gargling with a mixture of bleach and mouthwash. Officials of the state of Kansas stated on April 27 that a man drank disinfectant "because of the advice he'd received", but did not clarify the source of the advice. When Trump was asked by a reporter about "a spike in people using disinfectant after your comments last week", Trump interrupted the question, stating: "I can't imagine why." The reporter continued by asking: "Do you take any responsibility?" Trump replied: "No, I don't."

Apparently influenced by Trump's comments about using light as a treatment, a pharmaceutical company claimed to have an experimental ultraviolet technology against coronavirus. For this disinformation, the company was briefly suspended from Twitter and its video was removed from YouTube. Alex Jones's InfoWars published an article about the Twitter and YouTube response. On April 27, Jones texted Tucker Carlson, suggesting that Trump could seize the opportunity to "vindicate himself".

=== Convalescent therapy ===
Trump wanted to get speedy approval of convalescent plasma, and he complained that people within the health agencies who opposed him were deliberately delaying approval of treatments and vaccines until after the election. He wanted to be able to announce it as a treatment breakthrough at the 2020 Republican National Convention, but the National Institutes of Health (NIH) had concerns about its effectiveness. On the Wednesday before the convention, he ordered Francis Collins, head of the NIH, to "get it done by Friday." On the eve of the convention the NIH still had concerns, but Trump announced that the Food and Drug Administration had given emergency authorization for plasma therapy to be more widely used. In his announcement he greatly exaggerated the effectiveness of the treatment.

== Medical supplies ==
Around late February, Stephen Hahn, the head of the FDA, warned of national medical supplies being disrupted due to the outbreak.

On March 16, Trump told state governors that for medical equipment including respirators and ventilators, "We will be backing you, but try getting it yourselves." On March 24, Trump said state governors who wanted help from the federal government "have to treat us well, also", because "it's a two-way street"; he warned against governors arguing "we should get this, we should get that." Trump said the Governor of Washington, Jay Inslee, "shouldn't be relying on the federal government"; Inslee replied that the President should enact a "national mobilization of the industrial base in this country" to produce medical supplies.

On March 27, Trump said governors should be "appreciative" of himself, his administration, the Vice President, FEMA, the Army Corps, and several other agencies. Trump said "These people are incredible. They're working 24 hours a day. Mike Pence—I mean, Mike Pence, I don't think he sleeps anymore." Trump said he had advised Vice President Mike Pence, "If they don't treat you right, I don't call," adding "Mike, don't call the governor of Washington. You're wasting your time with him. Don't call the woman in Michigan. All—it doesn't make any difference what happens." Trump added that Pence would call them anyway. Governor Whitmer of Michigan, who had previously argued that "the federal government did not take this seriously early enough," responded that her state still needed personal protective equipment, ventilators, masks and test kits. On March 29, Trump denied that he had told Pence not to call certain governors: "I don't stop Pence," he said.

On the prevalence of medical supplies, Trump made unsubstantiated claims that "many of the states are stocked up," with certain hospitals "holding ventilators, they don't want to let 'em up." Trump has also questioned the exponential increase in mask demand during the pandemic and suggested that the reason for the shortage was masks "going out the back door". As evidence, the White House pointed to an early March call by Cuomo to investigate people who steal medical products. While there have been reports of small-scale thefts of hand sanitizer, gloves and masks around the country, Cuomo and New York hospitals rejected Trump's claims.

On April 3, Jared Kushner, Trump's son-in-law and adviser, stated regarding medical supplies that "what you have all over the country is a lot of people are asking for things that they don't necessarily need at the moment ... you have instances where in cities, [ventilators are] running out, but the state still has a stockpile [of ventilators]. And the notion of the federal stockpile was it's supposed to be our stockpile; it's not supposed to be state stockpiles that they then use." At the time that Kushner made his remarks, they were contradicted by the Department of Health and Human Services website, whose description of the federal stockpile explicitly stated that "state, local, tribal, and territorial responders" could request federal assistance through the stockpile. The website description was changed after journalists reported on the contradiction.

In April and continuing into May, Trump made multiple false claims that the Obama administration left him a "stockpile with a cupboard that was bare" or "empty". The Strategic National Stockpile for medical supplies was reported by the National Academies of Sciences, Engineering, and Medicine in 2016 to have around $7 billion worth of products, of which there were over 900 kinds. An NPR reporter, Nell Greenfieldboyce, visited a Strategic National Stockpile warehouse in June 2016, describing "shelves packed with stuff stand so tall that looking up makes me dizzy". In November 2019, the director of the stockpile at the time, Greg Burel, stated that the stockpile was worth $8 billion. After his retirement in January 2020, Burel stated that the stockpile "didn't receive funds to replace those masks, protective gear and the anti-virals" used during the 2009 swine flu pandemic in the United States. Due to limited funds, Burel said that the stockpile instead chose to "invest in those lifesaving drugs that would not be available from any other source, in the quantity needed, and in time". The Trump administration itself "largely waited until mid-March" 2020 to start buying large quantities of face masks, ventilators, and other medical equipment, reported the Associated Press.

Also in early April, the Office of Inspector General, U.S. Department of Health and Human Services released a report describing that U.S. hospitals in late March reported that long patient stays due to long waits for tests results were putting a strain on other resources, such as hospital beds, personal protective equipment and staffing. There were "widespread shortages" of personal protective equipment, and "shortages of critical supplies, materials, and logistics", including intravenous therapy poles and food.

On May 1, Trump bragged that his administration has "solved every problem ... quickly", including "the masks and all of the things", and "ensured a ventilator for every patient who needs one". Making the case for his reelection at the Republican National Convention on August 27, he said, "Not a single American who has needed a ventilator has been denied a ventilator, which is a miracle."

== Evaluation of U.S. response ==
On February 26, Trump judged the United States as "very, very ready for this, for anything", even "a breakout of larger proportions". On February 28, Trump accused Democrats of attempting to politicize the outbreak, stating that criticism of his administration's response was "their new hoax", drawing a parallel with the Russia investigation and his first impeachment. In mid-March, when asked by a journalist to "rate your response to this crisis" on "a scale of 1 to 10," Trump replied that he'd give himself a "10."

Fauci acknowledged on March 12 it was "a failing" of the U.S. system that the demand for coronavirus tests was not being met; Fauci later clarified that he believed the private sector should have been brought in sooner to address the shortfall.

On March 27, 2020, Fox News announced it had fired host Trish Regan for referring to rival media companies' coverage of the pandemic as a "scam," a liberal plot to "demonize and destroy" Trump and "to harm his chances of being re-elected."

In late March, Trump stated: "I don't think I would have done any better [on responding to the outbreak] if I had not been impeached. I don't think I would have acted any differently, or I don't think I would have acted any faster." On March 26, 2020, Mayor of New Orleans LaToya Cantrell stated that she would have cancelled Mardi Gras festivities had the Trump administration been more proactive in its early communications regarding COVID-19, saying that "we were not given a warning".

On April 7, Trump stated: "I couldn't have done it any better", even if he did not see a January memo from his adviser, Peter Navarro, warning about the threat of the outbreak. Trump also claimed that a federal government report that hospitals reported shortages in medical supplies was "wrong". He went on to describe the report as "Another Fake Dossier". Trump pointed out that the author of the report, Christi Grimm, "spent 8 years with the Obama Administration" (Grimm had joined the office in 1999, meaning she had also worked for the two administrations before Obama's). Trump falsely insisted the report was Grimm's "opinion" despite being told that the office had interviewed 323 hospitals in producing the report. Grimm was performing the duties of an acting inspector general of health, as the post of the inspector general of health was vacant. In May 2020, Trump nominated Jason Weida to be the permanent inspector general, pending confirmation by the U.S. Senate. According to a department spokeswoman, Grimm will remain in her original position as principal deputy inspector general of health.

In mid-April, Fauci stated that if the administration "started mitigation earlier", more lives could have been saved, and "no one is going to deny that." However, Fauci explained that the decision-making for implementing mitigation measures was "complicated", and "there was a lot of pushback about shutting things down back then." Fauci's comments were met with a hostile response from former Republican congressional candidate DeAnna Lorraine. Trump retweeted Lorraine's response, which included the call to "#FireFauci", drawing public alarm. As a result, the White House denied that Trump was firing Fauci, and blamed the media for overreacting. Nonetheless, Fauci dialed back his television appearances in May. On July 1, Trump retweeted an unscientific social media poll by the organization ACT! for America in which Twitter users, given the binary choice, had claimed to trust Trump over Fauci.

In late April, Trump's adviser and son-in-law, Jared Kushner, declared that in response to the pandemic, "the federal government rose to the challenge, and this is a great success story." Kushner's claims were ridiculed by officials of previous administrations, who stated that the roughly 60,000 U.S. deaths at the time could not be called a success. In other remarks, Kushner stated that people should not be questioning why the testing system took so long to set up, but rather ask: "How did we do this so quickly?"

Also in late April, Trump was asked if he had ignored warnings about COVID-19 in January and February from his intelligence advisers. Trump defended his own response to the pandemic by falsely claiming that Anthony Fauci in late February said the coronavirus outbreak was "no problem" and was "going to blow over". In fact, Fauci had on February 29 said that "this is an evolving situation", "now the risk is still low, but this could change ... when you start to see community spread", and that "this could be a major outbreak".

In late May, Trump was interviewed about a Columbia University study that concluded that nearly 36,000 deaths in the U.S. could have been prevented with earlier social distancing measures or earlier lockdowns. Trump said that he "saw that report", describing it as a "disgrace", and claimed that the Columbia University was a "liberal, disgraceful institution to write that because all the people that they cater to were months after me", citing his travel restriction on foreigners coming from China. Also in late May, Trump wrote in the same tweet that there were simultaneously "no credit" and "great reviews on our handling" of COVID-19.

During the 2020 election season, Trump was "distracted" and the White House was "somewhat complacent," according to Deborah Birx, former coronavirus response coordinator for the White House, when she was later interviewed by congressional investigators in October 2021. Speaking at a time when the U.S. death toll had exceeded 700,000, she said that better messaging about public health might have prevented 130,000 American deaths.

=== Travel bans and xenophobia allegations ===
On January 31, 2020, Trump announced an executive order that would restrict entry into the country by foreign nationals who had recently visited China. During a campaign event in Iowa the same day, Democratic presidential candidate and former vice president Joe Biden argued that decisions by the Trump administration to consolidate the National Security Council's Directorate of Global Health Security and Biodefense into a counterproliferation and biodefense role, and cut funding to the CDC, NIH, and United States Agency for International Development (USAID), would hamper the United States' response to COVID-19. Biden went on to argue that "in moments like this, this is where the credibility of a president is most needed, as he explains what we should and should not do. This is no time for Donald Trump's record of hysterical xenophobia and fear mongering to lead the way instead of science." Biden made a Twitter post with a similar statement the next day. While the timing of the statements did coincide with the announcement of the travel ban, Biden made no reference to the ban, while his campaign staff stated that the remarks were in reference to Trump's racial views in general, including the Muslim travel ban.

On the March 26 episode of Hannity, Trump accused Biden of saying his travel restrictions were xenophobic and racist; Biden's campaign said that the comments were in reference to Trump's racial views in general, and Biden's deputy campaign manager later stated that he supported travel restrictions "guided by medical experts, advocated by public health officials, and backed by a full strategy".

In late March, Trump, in defending against claims that the early response to the outbreak was mishandled, claimed that his decision to implement travel restrictions on China "was weeks early", and that "doctors—nobody wanted to make that decision at the time". He also claimed: "Everybody thought it was just unnecessary to do it." In early May, Trump stated that when he implemented the travel restrictions on China: "I was criticized by everybody, including Dr. Fauci ... When I closed the border to China, he disagreed with that." Trump's claims are false, according to the Associated Press and Slate: health secretary Alex Azar said on February 7 that the travel restrictions on China were recommended by the administration's health officials, specifically naming Fauci as one of them. Azar said that he and Trump had accepted the recommendation. According to reporting by The New York Times, Fauci and Robert Redfield had agreed to the travel restrictions on January 30, while according to The Wall Street Journal, Trump was "reluctant" to implement the restrictions, and had to be persuaded by Azar.

On April 1, Trump claimed that the United States had taken action "far earlier than anyone would have thought and way ahead of anybody else"; at least 11 countries had already imposed travel restrictions on China before the United States announced its restrictions on January 31 (one day after the WHO declared COVID-19 a Public Health Emergency of International Concern), but they did not take effect until February 2. By then, at least 46 countries and territories had implemented some form of travel restriction affecting China.

=== New York Times article and April 13 video ===
On April 12, The New York Times published an article detailing the government's slow response to COVID-19, including accusations that Trump repeatedly ignored warnings by Secretary of Health and Human Services Alex Azar. As no briefing was scheduled that day due to the Easter holiday, Trump criticized the article on Twitter—arguing that it was "a fake, just like the paper itself", and claiming that he was being "criticized for moving too fast when I issued the China Ban, long before most others wanted to do so", and that "[Azar] told me nothing until later".

During his briefing the next day, Trump screened a compilation of footage defending his early response, including a montage from the aforementioned March 26 Hannity showing guests on other news programs downplaying COVID-19's threat with the headline: "The media minimized the risk from the start", audio of New York Times reporter Maggie Haberman stating that the travel restrictions toward China were "probably effective, because it did actually take a pretty aggressive measure against the spread of the virus", as well as positive comments made by New York and California's governors Andrew Cuomo and Gavin Newsom. The video contained few references to Trump's optimistic remarks and inaction through January and February, and the Haberman audio stopped short of her saying that the travel restriction was "one of the last things that [Trump] did for several weeks".

When asked by CBS News correspondent Paula Reid about his lack of action and the downplaying of February from the video, Trump asked, "how do you close down the greatest economy in the history of the world when, on January 17, you have no cases and no deaths?". He also argued that "we did a lot [in February]", and told the reporter "Look, you know you're a fake. You know that the whole network, the way you cover it is fake." In an interview with MSNBC, former New York Times executive editor Howell Raines described the video as "one of the astonishing acts of disinformation we've seen from a White House since the Vietnam era and the 5 o'clock follies of the Lyndon Johnson administration."

== International matters ==
=== China and the World Health Organization ===
On January 22, Trump was asked by the media a question on regarding allegations of a lack of transparency regarding the outbreak in China: "Do you trust that we're going to know everything we need to know from China?" Trump answered: "I do. I do. I have a great relationship with President Xi." On January 24, Trump wrote on Twitter: "China has been working very hard to contain the Coronavirus. The United States greatly appreciates their efforts and transparency. It will all work out well. In particular, on behalf of the American People, I want to thank President Xi!"

On February 7, when Trump was asked by the media if he was "concerned that China is covering up the full extent of the coronavirus" outbreak in their country, Trump replied: "No, China's working very hard ... and I think they're doing a very professional job ... It's a tough situation. I think they're doing a very good job." On February 13, when Trump was asked by the media, "Did the Chinese tell the truth about this?" He responded: "Well, you never know", then praised China for having "handled it professionally".

On February 26, while Trump was visiting India, he stated: "China is working very, very hard." On February 27, during a press conference, he stated that General secretary of the Chinese Communist Party Xi Jinping "is working very, very hard."

On March 21, Trump spoke at a press conference, criticizing China for being "very, very secretive". When asked about his own comments on January 24 praising China's transparency, Trump answered that China was "transparent at that time", but "they could have been transparent much earlier than they were."

On April 7, Trump declared that the United States was "going to put a very powerful hold on" funding to the World Health Organization. Less than 20 minutes later, when he was asked about his announced decision, he denied his statement: "I'm not saying I'm going to do it, but we're going to look at it".

On April 14, Trump criticized the World Health Organization for failing to "call out China's lack of transparency", stating that the WHO "willingly took China's assurances to face value ... even praising China for its so-called transparency." He made this criticism in spite of his own similar behavior in January and February 2020.

On April 27, Trump lamented: "There has been so much unnecessary death in this country. It could have been stopped and it could have been stopped short, but somebody a long time ago, it seems, decided not to do it that way. And the whole world is suffering because of it. 184 countries, at least."

=== International cooperation ===
In his February 4 State of the Union address, Trump stated that his administration was working together with the Chinese government on the outbreak in China.

On March 26, President Trump spoke on the phone with CCP General Secretary Xi Jinping, and they pledged to cooperate in fighting against the pandemic. It signaled a fresh détente between the two countries after weeks of rising tensions. On the same day, after a video call summit with the other G20 leaders, Trump stated the United States was working with international allies to stop the spread of the coronavirus and to increase rapid information and data sharing.

The G20 summit began on November 21 and was held virtually due to the pandemic. Trump attended the opening event but then left to play golf at the Trump National Golf Club in Sterling, Virginia while the G20 continued with presentations about pandemic preparedness and response.

=== Terminology ===
On March 16, Trump began referring to COVID-19 as "the Chinese virus" and was criticized for creating a potential stigma. Trump disagreed with the criticism, saying "it comes from China" and that "China tried to say at one point—maybe they stopped—that it was caused by American soldiers. That can't happen." On March 23, Trump indicated he would stop using the "Chinese virus" term, citing the possibility of "nasty language" towards Asian-Americans. His subsequent communications reverted to the "China Virus" usage.

On March 25, the foreign ministers from the countries of the Group of Seven held an online conference. The group could not come into agreement on releasing a joint statement on the global outbreak because U.S. Secretary of State Mike Pompeo insisted on calling COVID-19 the "Wuhan virus". The previous day, the finance ministers and central bankers of the G7 had released a joint statement that referred to COVID-19. During press briefings and in a social media post in late-July 2020, Trump repeatedly used "China Virus" or "China Plague" to refer to COVID-19.

=== COVID-19's origins ===
On April 30, the Office of the Director of National Intelligence stated that the U.S. intelligence community "concurs with the wide scientific consensus that the COVID-19 virus was not manmade or genetically modified." It also stated that U.S. intelligence agencies were investigating whether the outbreak started from "contact with infected animals or if it was the result of an accident at a laboratory in Wuhan".

On May 3, Secretary of State Mike Pompeo claimed in an interview that there existed "a significant amount of evidence" that COVID-19 originated from a laboratory in Wuhan. After Pompeo also claimed that the "best experts so far seem to think [COVID-19] was man-made", the journalist informed Pompeo that he had contradicted the U.S. intelligence agencies' stance (as written above). Pompeo then changed his stance, stating that he had "no reason to disbelieve" the agencies.

In an interview published on May 4, Anthony Fauci stated that the scientific evidence "is very, very strongly leaning toward" that the evolution of COVID-19 "could not have been artificially or deliberately manipulated".

== Personal health ==
On May 21 in an interview on the South Lawn, Trump used confusing wording to describe the result of his most recent negative test for the virus, explaining that he had "tested very positively in another sense", as in "positively toward the negative".

Trump eventually did contract the virus during an outbreak in the White House. On October 2, Trump announced he and First Lady Melania Trump had tested positive. According to White House chief of staff Mark Meadows in 2021 book, his first positive test was actually on September 26; this was three days before the first presidential debate. Meadows also said Trump had then tested negative from a different test shortly after the positive result. Trump denied this allegation. Hours after tweeting this announcement, his oxygen levels dropped. He was hospitalized for three days at Walter Reed Medical Center, during which time he was given Regeneron's experimental antibody cocktail (which fewer than 10 people had ever taken), the intravenous antiviral remdesivir, and the steroid dexamethasone. On October 7, Trump posted a five-minute video to Twitter in which he said he considered the Regeneron drug not just "therapeutic" but a "cure" because he felt better after taking it, that he was pursuing emergency use authorization so that all Americans would have access to it, and that—as he repeated three times in the video—it would be "free." Trump declared on television on October 11 that he was now "immune" to further infection. When he tweeted a similar statement, Twitter placed a warning label on it, saying the information was "misleading and potentially harmful."

Donald and Melania Trump were both vaccinated in January 2021, days before Donald Trump's presidency ended. He did not reveal that he had been vaccinated; rather, a former adviser to Trump revealed the information to the New York Times, which published the information on March 1. In October, he disclosed that the vaccine he received was made by Pfizer.

== Daily press briefings ==
In March 2020, the Trump administration started conducting daily press briefings at the White House. At the end of March, Trump boasted of the high "ratings" of his press briefings. Particularly controversial comments about sunlight and disinfectants were made on April 23; the next day, the press briefing was noticeably shorter and had no question period. Axios subsequently reported that there were plans for the briefings to be downsized and no longer feature Trump on a regular basis.

On May 1, 2020, the new White House Press Secretary Kayleigh McEnany reinstated the traditional White House press briefings, which had not been held in over a year. The previous press secretary, Stephanie Grisham, had never held a press briefing during her tenure. Grisham would later tell CNN that "the way we handled COVID was tragic...I don't think I'll ever forgive myself with respect to COVID." She also blamed Trump for "working for his base, not for this country."

On June 26, 2020, the Coronavirus Task Force held its first briefing since April, addressing a major spike in cases in California and other southern states. The briefing was held from the Department of Health and Human Services rather than the White House, and led by Pence. Trump (who was preparing for an unrelated press appearance at the White House) was absent from the briefing.

On July 21, 2020, Trump returned to holding occasional media briefings on COVID-19, this time performing them solo without any other health officials speaking. When asked about this during a subsequent briefing, Trump stated that this arrangement was intended to make the briefings more "concise".

=== Accuracy ===
Trump was criticized for making exaggerated and inaccurate statements at these briefings, including about U.S. efforts to control COVID-19, promotion of his political positions and platform, and attacks on the media. Critics described the briefings as more akin to "propaganda" that were supplanting public rallies for his 2020 re-election campaign. There were calls for broadcasters to refuse to air the briefings live and instead to allow for fact-checking and vetting of remarks before airing the briefings.

=== Analysis ===
Trump himself began delivering briefings from March 13; he spoke almost every day, noted BuzzFeed News on April 14. From mid-March to early April, the press briefing lengths increased from 61 minutes to 105 minutes, while Trump's speaking time per session increased from 20 minutes to 53 minutes. On April 10, he spoke to reporters for 133 minutes straight. On April 26, The Washington Post reported that Trump had taken up 60% of the time of the press briefings since March 16.

The New York Times analysed over five weeks worth of Trump's speeches from March 9 to April 17, amounting to over 260,000 words. The most common pattern found was Trump's "self-congratulations", with around 600 instances. His self-praise was "often predicated on exaggerations and falsehoods", of which The New York Times found over 130 instances. Trump praised others over 360 times, and blamed others over 110 times. There were around 100 instances of "appeals to national unity", and around 60 instances of "empathy". He made many more remarks lamenting the pandemic's economic damage than its human cost.

The Washington Post analysed three weeks worth of Trump's briefings from April 6 to 24, for over 13 hours of Trump speaking. He spent a total of 2 hours on criticizing others, with the most targeted groups being Democrats, the media, state governors, and China. He spent 45 minutes praising himself and his administration, while taking a total of less than 5 minutes in offering condolences. He spent 9 minutes promoting hydroxychloroquine. When questions were posed to other members of his team, Trump gave an answer more than 33% of the time, including when the other official had already answered the question. In nearly 25% of his comments or remarks, Trump offered false or misleading information, analysed The Washington Post.

Legal analyst Glenn Kirschner argued that President Donald Trump should be charged with manslaughter for deaths resulting from him intentionally lying to the American public about the danger posed by COVID-19 virus during the COVID pandemic.

=== Broadcasts ===
Some broadcasters have re-evaluated their approach to covering the briefings: by late-March, CNN and MSNBC had become more cautious in their broadcasts, especially towards remarks by Trump that veer too far from the topic of public health, or during situations where the briefing had become unreasonably long. During the April 13 briefing, CNN cut away in the middle of the aforementioned video, with anchor John King arguing that "[playing] a propaganda video at taxpayer expense in the White House briefing room is a new—you can insert your favorite word here in this administration", and MSNBC cutting away following the video, with Ari Melber describing it as "some kind of backward-looking edited video propaganda".

The practice has, in turn, faced criticism by those who feel they should be broadcast in their entirety due to their importance; deputy Press Secretary Judd Deere tweeted that it was "pretty disgraceful" for the two networks to cut away from the March 23 briefing early, and thanked Fox News for "keeping Americans informed". In response, Washington Post media writer Erik Wemple remarked that "... keeping Americans informed requires editing this president. A lot."

=== Accessibility ===
The Coronavirus Task Force briefings did not offer real-time interpretation in American Sign Language. On August 4, 2020, the National Association of the Deaf and a group of five deaf individuals sued the White House for not providing interpretation. Not all deaf viewers are able to fully understand written English (as used by closed captioning). Most state-level briefings utilized interpreters.

== Suppressing mention of COVID-19 ==
A June 22, 2020, internal memo from the National Marine Fisheries Service banned employees from mentioning "anything COVID-related" in official actions without executive approval, and recommended euphemisms like "in these extraordinary times" if reference to the pandemic was necessary.

In April 2020, the White House released guidelines that omitted details provided by the CDC and FEMA. In July, CDC guidelines minimized risks and argued for reopening schools. In August, CDC guidelines said that asymptomatic people did not need to be tested (though the CDC revoked this recommendation a month later). In March 2021, the new CDC director, Rochelle Walensky, referred to these three instances, observing that the documents were evidently "not primarily authored" by CDC staff and promising not to allow this type of political influence in the future.

== Public response to communication ==
A poll conducted from March 11 to March 15 by the Kaiser Family Foundation estimated that President Trump was trusted to provide reliable information on the coronavirus by 46% of Americans (19% among Democrats and 88% among Republicans). The CDC was trusted to provide reliable information on the coronavirus by 85% of Americans (85% among Democrats and 90% among Republicans). Trump had an overall lower trust regarding this topic compared to the news media, local government officials, state government officials, and the World Health Organization. The CDC had the highest overall trust.

A poll conducted from April 16 to April 20 by the Associated Press and NORC at the University of Chicago estimated that President Trump was a source of information on the pandemic for 28% of Americans. In terms of trust in Trump for information on the outbreak, 23% have a high amount of trust, while 21% have a moderate amount of trust. Americans used state or local officials more as a source of information, and also trusted them more than Trump.

A poll conducted from May 7 to May 10 by SRSS for CNN, concluded that only 36% of people in the U.S. trusted President Trump on information about the COVID-19 outbreak. 4% of Democrats trusted information from Trump, while around 80% to 81% of Democrats trusted information from Anthony Fauci or the CDC. 84% of Republicans trusted information from Trump; this was higher than their trust in information from the CDC (72%) or Fauci (61%).

A poll conducted on May 20 and 21 by Yahoo News and YouGov found that a plurality of U.S. adults (33%) felt that the top source of misinformation about COVID-19 was the Trump administration. This was a higher figure than the following sources: the mainstream media, social media, local news, state officials, family and friends. 56% of Democrats stated that the Trump administration was top source of misinformation about COVID-19, while only 11% of Republicans agreed. Despite Trump downplaying the threat from COVID-19 over 40 times, 51% of Republicans believe that Trump had always viewed COVID-19 as a very serious threat, while 8% of Democrats agreed. Despite the U.S. intelligence agencies, public health experts, and Trump administration officials warning of the possibility that such a serious pandemic would happen, 52% of Republicans thought that such a pandemic was "something nobody thought could happen", as did 36% of Democrats.

A poll conducted July 12–15 by The Washington Post and ABC News found that 38% of Americans approved of Trump's handling of the crisis. This had dropped from the 51% approval recorded in March.

== After the first Trump administration ==
Trump left office on January 20, 2021. When New York Times reporter Maggie Haberman interviewed him in March 2021, he told her that business at his members-only club, Mar-a-Lago, had decreased during the pandemic. "COVID", he observed. "Turns out, not good."

Trump was elected to a second term which began January 20, 2025. In April 2025, all COVID-19-related websites operated by the federal government (including COVID.gov and COVIDtests.gov) were taken down and redirected to a Whitehouse.gov landing page that endorses the COVID-19 lab leak theory.

== See also ==
- Social media use by Donald Trump
- List of conspiracy theories promoted by Donald Trump
- COVID-19 misinformation § Trump administration
- Right-wing antiscience
- Political interference with science agencies by the first Trump administration
- False or misleading statements by Donald Trump § COVID-19 pandemic
- COVID-19 Advisory Board, a more muscular task force proposed by then-President-elect Joe Biden
- White House COVID-19 Response Team, established by President Joe Biden
- Biden administration COVID-19 action plan
- U.S. federal government response to the COVID-19 pandemic
