= AFLD =

AFLD may refer to:

- Alcoholic fatty liver disease, fatty liver disease caused by overconsumption of alcohol
- Agence française de lutte contre le dopage, the French anti-doping agency
- America's Frontline Doctors, a right-wing organization opposed to many COVID-19 control measures
