= Charles Howe (boxer) =

American boxer

Personal information
- Born: November 24, 1974 (age 51) Grelton, Ohio, U.S.
- Weight: middleweight

Boxing career
- Stance: orthodox

Boxing record
- Total fights: 24
- Wins: 17
- Win by KO: 9
- Losses: 4
- Draws: 0
- No contests: 0

Charles Howe (born November 24, 1974) is an American professional boxer. He challenged for the WBC USNBC middleweight title.

== Background ==
Howe was born and raised in Grelton, Ohio. He works as a boxing trainer in Toledo.

His brother is former heavyweight boxer Jamie "The Featherman" Howe.

== Professional career ==
Howe turned professional in February 1993 in Chicago. In his debut Howe defeated fellow debutant Randall McHenry with a points victory over four rounds. After this initial victory Howe then suffered two defeats in 1993. Following two defeats so early in his career, Howe then left boxing and only return four years later when he knocked out Derrick Jones. Another year would pass before Howe would fight again. After having on one fight in almost five years Howe then returned to boxing in earnest in May 1998. Within a year Howe notched up five straight victories, including four by knockout.

In August 1999, Howe faced the then unbeaten Cornelius Bundrage, star of the ESPN reality show "Contender Season 2". Howe picked up a cut in the first round and Bundrage was docked a point for a low blow in the third. The fight went to the scorecard and Howe lost the decision by a split decision, with one of the judges giving the fight to Howe. After the split decision defeat to Bundrage, Howe went seven years and thirteen fights with a single defeat. This run included ten wins, with four knockouts, two draws and a no contest.

=== Joey Gilbert bout ===
On September 21, 2007, Howe faced Joey Gilbert, another star of The Contender, at Grand Sierra Resort, Reno, Nevada. Gilbert, 31, had a 16–1 record with 12 knockouts and was defending World Boxing Council-affiliated United States National Boxing Championships middleweight title against Howe. Howe got caught early in the fight and was down twice before the fight was stopped in the first round. After the fight Gilbert was suspended from boxing by the Nevada Athletic Commission when he tested positive in a urinalysis before and after his fight with Howe. Gilbert tested positive for steroid Stanozolol Metabolite, methamphetamine, amphetamine and three other substances -- nordiazepam, oxazepam and temazepam, all substances banned by the commission.

Following the result of the hearing this fight may be overturned to a "no contest".

== Professional boxing record ==
26 fights	17 wins	5 losses
By knockout	9	2
By decision	8	3
Draws	2	
No contests	2	

No.	Result	Record	Opponent	Type	Round, time	Date	Location	Notes
26	Loss	17–5–2 (2)	(United States) Vanes Martirosyan	TKO	1 (10), 1:20	2008-11-01	(United States) Mandalay Bay Events Center, Las Vegas, Nevada, USA	
25	Loss	17–4–2 (2)	(Republic of Ireland) John Duddy	UD	10	2008-06-28	(United States) The Castle, Boston, Massachusetts, USA	
24	ND	17–3–2 (2)	(United States) Joey Gilbert	ND	1 (10), 2:16	2007-09-21	(United States) Grand Sierra Resort, Reno, Nevada, USA	For WBC United States (USNBC) middleweight title. Originally TKO loss; overturned to a No Decision after Gilbert failed his post-fight drug test.
23	Win	17–3–2 (1)	(United States) Tony Black	TKO	2 (6), 0:54	2006-05-19	(United States) Wheeling Island Casino Racetrack, Wheeling, West Virginia, USA	
22	Win	16–3–2 (1)	(United States) Mike McFail	UD	6	2006-03-24	(United States) Wheeling Island Casino Racetrack, Wheeling, West Virginia, USA	
21	Draw	15–3–2 (1)	(United States) James North	PTS	4	2005-10-15	(United States) Chaparral Club, Akron, Ohio, USA	
20	Win	15–3–1 (1)	(United States) Mark Norge	UD	8	2003-08-15	(United States) Summerset Hall, Toledo, Ohio, USA	
19	Win	14–3–1 (1)	(United States) Tyrone Mack	UD	8	2002-08-17	(United States) SeaGate Convention Centre, Toledo, Ohio, USA	
18	Draw	13–3–1 (1)	(United States) Gabriel Rodriguez	PTS	12	2002-04-26	(United States) PromoWest Pavilion, Columbus, Ohio, USA	
17	Win	13–3 (1)	(United States) Roni Algus Krull	TKO	3 (?)	2002-03-16	(United States) USA	
16	Win	12–3 (1)	(United States) Mark Norge	PTS	8	2001-11-21	(United States) Holiday Inn Metroplex, Youngstown, Ohio, USA	
15	ND	11–3 (1)	(United States) Joe Guzman	ND	4	2001-10-05	(United States) St. Paul Armory, Saint Paul, Minnesota, USA	
14	Win	11–3	(United States) Brian Thacker	PTS	4	2001-06-24	(United States) USA	
13	Win	10–3	(United States) Jamie Voyles	TKO	4 (?)	2001-03-03	(United States) Findlay, Ohio, USA	
12	Win	9–3	(United States) Mark Norge	PTS	8	2000-11-04	(United States) USA	
11	Win	8–3	(Mexico) Hector Ramirez	KO	3 (8), 2:10	2000-03-11	(United States) National Guard Armory, Findlay, Ohio, USA	
10	Loss	7–3	(United States) Cornelius Bundrage	SD	6	1999-08-06	(United States) State Fairgrounds, Columbus, Ohio, USA	
9	Win	7–2	(United States) Larry Hinesley	PTS	4	1999-05-14	(United States) Grays Armory, Cleveland, Ohio, USA	
8	Win	6–2	(United States) Sean Crowdus	KO	1 (4), 0:35	1999-04-03	(United States) UAW Hall, Lima, Ohio, USA	
7	Win	5–2	(United States) Deshone Higgenbottom	TKO	2 (4)	1998-08-28	(United States) St. Joseph Hall, Akron, Ohio, USA	
6	Win	4–2	(United States) Jeff Elrod	TKO	4 (4)	1998-08-21	(United States) Columbus, Ohio, USA	
5	Win	3–2	(United States) Guy Packer	TKO	1 (4)	1998-05-09	(United States) Holland, Ohio, USA	
4	Win	2–2	(United States) Derrick Jones	TKO	2 (?)	1997-05-10	(United States) Circleville, Ohio, USA	
3	Loss	1–2	(United States) Wes Caldwell	PTS	6	1993-11-14	(United States) Columbus Convention Center, Columbus, Ohio, USA	
2	Loss	1–1	(United States) Alfonso Ortiz	TKO	2 (4), 1:22	1993-05-08	(United States) Saint Andrews Gym, Chicago, Illinois, USA	
1	Win	1–0	(United States) Randall McHenry	PTS	4	1993-02-26	(United States) Chicago, Illinois, USA	
