= Stella Immanuel =

Cameroonian-American physician, author, and pastor

- Born: 1965 (age 60–61); Cameroon
- Other name: Stella Gwandiku-Ambe
- Education: University of Calabar (MD)
- Occupations: Physician; author; pastor

Stella Gwandiku-Ambe Immanuel (born 1965) is a Cameroonian-American physician and pastor. In mid-2020 amid the COVID-19 pandemic, a video went viral on social media platforms in which Immanuel said hydroxychloroquine can cure COVID-19, and that public health measures such as social distancing and the wearing of face masks were ineffective and unnecessary. The platforms removed Immanuel's videos and posts, which they said promoted misinformation related to the pandemic.

Immanuel is also the founder of a charismatic religious organization called Fire Power Ministries; in her role as its founder, she has made fringe claims about other medical conditions, especially in relation to human sexuality. She has said endometriosis, infertility, miscarriage, and sexually transmitted infections (STIs) are caused by spirit spouses, and has also endorsed a number of conspiracy theories that include the involvement of space aliens and the Illuminati in manipulating society and government.

Immanuel emigrated to the United States after completing her medical education in Nigeria. As of 2021, she practices at a private clinic in Houston, Texas.

== Early life and education ==
Stella Gwandiku-Ambe Immanuel was born in 1965 in Cameroon. She recalled an interest in becoming a doctor from the age of four. Immanuel attended Cameroon Protestant College, a secondary school in Bali, Cameroon. In 1990, she graduated from medical school at the University of Calabar in Nigeria, and in 1992, she moved to the United States. Immanuel completed a pediatric residency at the Bronx-Lebanon Hospital Center in New York City.

== Career ==
Immanuel began her career at a pediatric clinic in Louisiana. In December 1998, she began practicing at the Southern Pediatric Clinic in Alexandria, Louisiana. In February 1999, she joined the General Pediatric Care Clinic as a pediatrician. In 2006, she owned the Rapha Medical and Therapeutic Clinic in Louisiana. She is a licensed physician in Texas. The Texas Medical Board licensed Immanuel in November 2019 with an address associated with Houston's Rehoboth Medical Center, which she also owns.

Immanuel is a pastor, founder of Fire Power Ministries, and host of a radio-and-television show entitled Fire Power. She is a self-described "wealth transfer coach" and has written several books as part of her Occupying Force series. She has been an outspoken supporter of U.S. president Donald Trump and a long-time critic of what she views as sexual immorality, including "unmarried couples living together, homosexuality, bestiality, polygamy" and what she calls "homosexual terrorism". According to Concordia University theological studies professor André Gagné, Immanuel's beliefs originate in African Pentecostalism and the charismatic movement.

A January 2020 medical malpractice lawsuit filed against Immanuel alleged that a 37-year-old woman died after Immanuel failed to remove a needle fragment from her arm. According to the lawsuit, the woman told Immanuel that the broken needle had lodged in her arm while injecting methamphetamine. Immanuel prescribed medication but did not take X-rays or attempt to retrieve the needle. It was removed later, by a different physician, after a flesh-eating infection had developed. In April 2020, local deputies were unable to serve notice of the Louisiana suit because Immanuel had moved to Houston, where she set up a new practice.

=== Medical and other claims ===
Immanuel's medical claims are sometimes combined with her spiritual beliefs: she believes many gynecological illnesses are the result of having sex dreams with succubi and incubi, and receiving demon sperm; and that endometriosis, infertility, miscarriage, and sexually transmitted infections are caused by spirit spouses. In a 2015 sermon, Immanuel said space alien DNA is used in medical treatments and that "reptilian spirits" and other extraterrestrials run the U.S. government. The same year, she also said Illuminati are using witches to destroy the world through abortion, gay marriage, children's toys, and media, including Harry Potter, Pokémon, Wizards of Waverly Place and Hannah Montana. In another 2015 sermon, she said scientists are developing vaccines to stop people from being religious.

==== COVID-19 misinformation ====
On July 27, 2020, Immanuel appeared in a Tea Party Patriots-backed press event that was organized by the group "America's Frontline Doctors" (Note: According to reporting by the Agence France-Presse on July 28, 2020, the website for America's Frontline Doctors was registered only days earlier, and had since been taken down.) in front of the steps of the U.S. Supreme Court Building. She said she had cured COVID-19 in 350 patients at her clinic using a combination of hydroxychloroquine, azithromycin, and zinc, (Note: This claim is not supported by any strong scientific research; no drug has been approved as a specific cure for COVID-19) and that public health measures such as the wearing of facial coverings and social distancing are unnecessary. Republican representative Ralph Norman from South Carolina attended the event. The far-right website Breitbart News published the press event's video.

On October 15, 2021, the Texas medical board took corrective action against Immanuel over her hydroxychloroquine prescription for COVID patient. In the decision, the board ordered Immanuel to submit proof of informed consent, or permission given by a patient who understands the possible health outcomes, for all of the off-label treatments she provides. She also was ordered to pay a $500 fine to the medical board.

The U.S. Food and Drug Administration (FDA) had earlier removed the emergency use authorization for the antimalarial medication hydroxychloroquine against COVID-19; the FDA said the drug had not been proven to be an effective treatment for the disease.

The video was viewed millions of times, and was retweeted by President Trump and his son Donald Trump Jr., before it was removed from Facebook, Twitter, and YouTube because it broke their rules on misinformation. At a press conference on July 28, President Trump was asked why he would trust Immanuel in the context of her claims about alien DNA and its supposed use in medicine; Trump defended Immanuel, saying, "I thought she was very impressive, in the sense that, from where she came—I don't know what country she comes from—but she said she's had tremendous success with hundreds of different patients. I thought her voice was an important voice, but I know nothing about her."

After being pressed further, Trump abruptly ended the briefing. After her content was removed from Facebook, Immanuel expressed her frustration on Twitter, saying, "Hello Facebook put back my profile page and videos up or your computers with [sic] start crashing till you do. You are not bigger that [sic] God. I promise you. If my page is not back up face book [sic] will be down in Jesus [sic] name."

She later posted a tweet accusing technology companies of censorship; that content was also removed from the platform.

In July 2021, she sued CNN and specifically Anderson Cooper, saying that their coverage of her in 2020 had defamed her. She lost the case after failing to show the network made any false statements.

In March 2023, MedPage Today reported that Immanuel was the single highest prescriber of ivermectin and hydroxychloroquine in the United States for the years 2021 and 2022. In 2021, Immanuel wrote just over 69,000 prescriptions for hydroxychloroquine—vastly above the average of 43 prescriptions in the database MedPage Today reviewed. Rheumatologists, who prescribe hydroxychloroquine for autoimmune diseases, wrote 561 hydroxychloroquine prescriptions, on average, that year. Immanuel also wrote almost 32,000 prescriptions for ivermectin in 2021, well above the average of 15.
