= Simone Gold =

American anti-vaccine activist and founder of America's Frontline Doctors

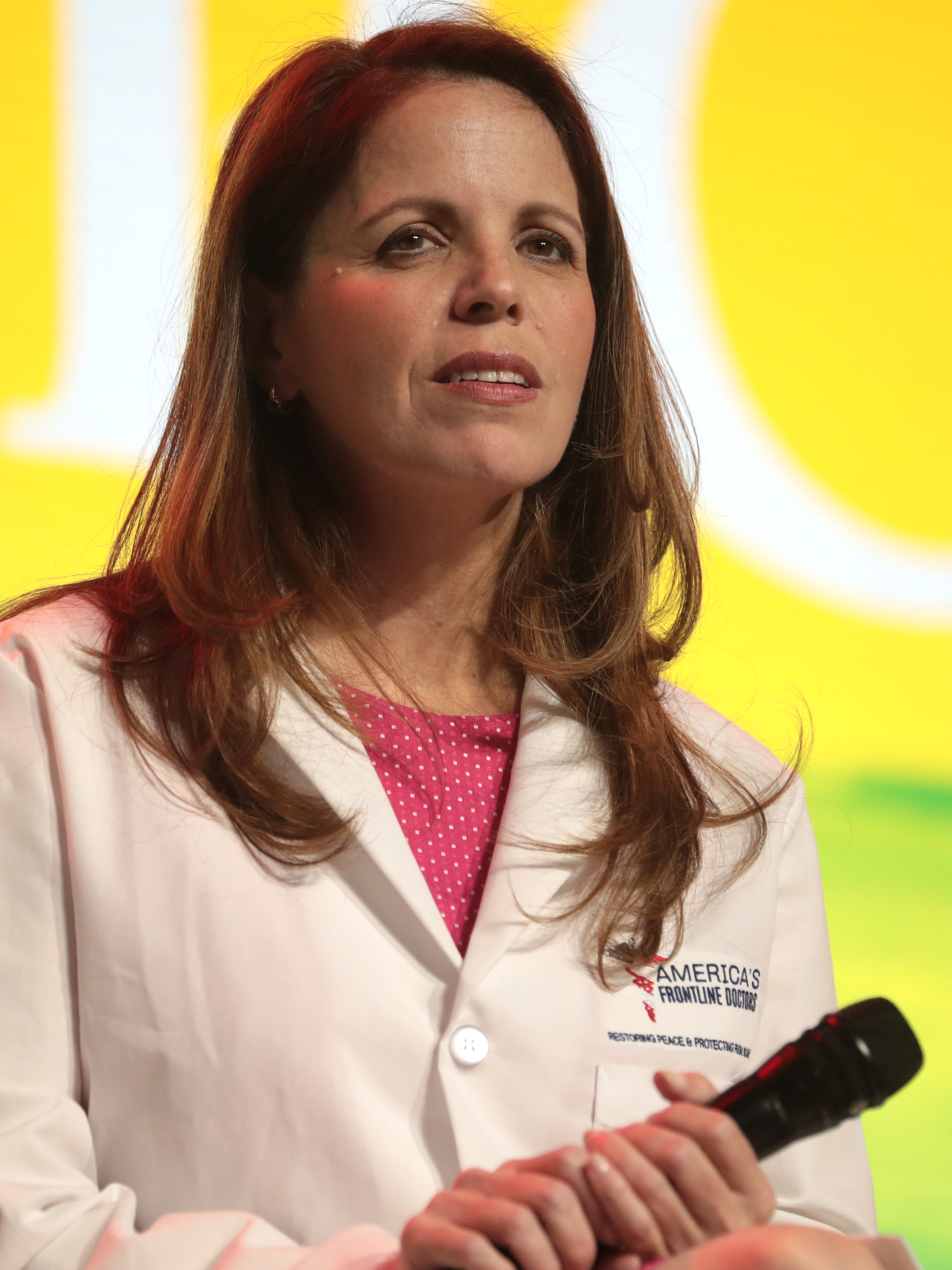
- Gold in 2020
- Education: City College of New York (BS); Rosalind Franklin University (MD); Stanford University (JD)
- Known for: Founding America's Frontline Doctors, participating in the 2021 storming of the United States Capitol
- Medical career
- Profession: Emergency physician
- Website: thegoldopinion.com

Simone Melissa Gold (née Tizes) is an American doctor known for her opposition to the COVID-19 vaccines. She is the founder of America's Frontline Doctors, a right-wing political organization known for spreading misinformation about the COVID-19 pandemic. Before her arrest and guilty plea for participating in the 2021 United States Capitol attack, she had gained attention when a video of an America's Frontline Doctors press conference in front of the US Supreme Court Building went viral in July 2020. During the press conference, she touted the supposed benefits of hydroxychloroquine, despite evidence that it is ineffective as a COVID-19 treatment and can carry significant risks.

On January 5, 2021, Gold spoke at a rally in Washington, D.C., telling attendees to refuse to be vaccinated for COVID-19; the next day she took part in the Capitol attack. She spoke from the rotunda of the Capitol and was later arrested for her participation in the storming, having admitted she entered the building. She eventually pleaded guilty to a federal misdemeanor and was sentenced to 60 days in prison and a $9,500 fine. On January 20, 2025, the first day of the second presidency of Donald Trump, Gold was pardoned along with nearly every other participant in the Capitol riot.

== Early life and career ==
Gold was born to Reuben (a medical school professor) and Carol Tizes (an elementary school teacher for special needs children), and raised on Long Island, New York. She graduated from the City College of New York at age 19, and received her Doctor of Medicine (M.D.) degree from the Chicago Medical School in 1989. After obtaining a medical license in California, Gold attended Stanford Law School, graduating in 1993. Gold described attending law school as her "rebellion" against her father, who wanted his children to be doctors. She was admitted to the New York bar in 1997 and shortly afterward completed a residency in emergency medicine at the Renaissance School of Medicine at Stony Brook University. According to Gold, she also worked as a fellow to U.S. Congressman Jim Jeffords in 1997, though Jeffords' former chief of staff who had worked for Jeffords for 25 years did not remember her when asked about her in 2021. In 2009 she worked as an assistant to Israeli Ambassador to the United States Michael Oren. Although Oren credited her in articles he published, in 2021 he claimed not to have any memory of her.

Gold's emergency medicine certification lapsed in December 2020, though she was still a licensed physician in the state of California as of September 2021.

== Activism ==
=== Open letter to Donald Trump ===
In May 2020, Gold organized an open letter to then-president Donald Trump regarding COVID-19 lockdowns. The letter urged Trump to end the "national shutdown," calling it a "mass casualty incident." It cited issues of patients avoiding medical care, increased substance abuse, and greater financial instability. The letter was co-signed by more than 600 doctors with Gold as the primary signatory.

=== America's Frontline Doctors video ===
In July 2020, Gold and her group, America's Frontline Doctors, held a press conference on the steps in front of the Supreme Court. The press conference was referred to as the "White Coat Summit" and was organized by Gold in conjunction with the Tea Party Patriots, a right-wing political organization, and was broadcast by Breitbart News. It featured Gold and other doctors speaking about the perceived merits of hydroxychloroquine, despite evidence that it is ineffective as a COVID-19 treatment and can carry significant risks. They have opposed wearing masks to prevent the spread of COVID-19. The video went viral after being retweeted by the Trump family and reached over 14 million views before its quick removal from Facebook, Twitter, and YouTube for violating their policies related to the spreading of COVID-19 misinformation. Gold was fired from the hospitals where she had worked as an emergency department physician in the aftermath of the video.

=== Anti-COVID 19 vaccine activism ===
The day before the distribution of Pfizer's COVID-19 vaccine, Gold spoke outside the Centers for Disease Control and Prevention headquarters in Atlanta, repeatedly calling the vaccine "experimental" and criticizing potential vaccine mandates, drawing criticism from doctors and researchers. Peter Hotez, a vaccine researcher from the Baylor College of Medicine, said there were no vaccine mandates and said, "[n]o real frontline doctor objects to this vaccine — only the antivax 'health freedom' movement linked to right wing extremism [does]."

Gold spoke about the COVID-19 vaccines at The Stand, an event that describes itself as a series of "Open Air Mass Healing & Miracle Services." In the speech, she praised hydroxychloroquine and continued to make unfounded claims about dangers of the COVID-19 vaccines.

After Gold was blocked from Facebook for violating their community standards, her anti-COVID-19 vaccination speeches began appearing on the hosting platform Rumble, which does not have a policy on misinformation. These videos feature Gold telling audiences not to get vaccinated for COVID-19 and praising hydroxychloroquine as a treatment despite numerous studies showing it was ineffective against SARS-CoV-2. She alleged the United States government experimented on black people to test the general safety of vaccines.

On February 14, 2021, over one month after participating in the storming of the Capitol building, Gold spoke at Awaken Church in San Marcos, California, discouraging members of the congregation from being vaccinated for COVID-19.

=== Participation in the 2021 Capitol attack and conviction ===
On January 5, 2021, Gold spoke at a rally in Washington, D.C. to a crowd of people gathering in the city for the following day's "Stop the Steal" rally. She opposed the COVID-19 vaccines, claimed COVID-19 was non-fatal, and made additional unfounded claims about the vaccines. She told supporters, "If you don't want to take an experimental biological agent deceptively named a vaccine, you must not allow yourself to be coerced!" Gold was scheduled to speak at the Rally for Health Freedom scheduled for 6 January, but the rally was cancelled before her speech. She then joined the crowd and illegally entered the Capitol building along with America's Frontline Doctors Communications Director, John Strand. Gold and Strand were seen on video footage "in the middle of a crowd attempting to push past law enforcement officials to get inside." She then gave the speech she had planned to give at the rally in the rotunda of the Capitol building. Gold said that she spent approximately 20 minutes in the Capitol.

Gold and Strand were later identified by FBI wanted images from the event circulated on social media. Gold was arrested at her home in Beverly Hills, California on January 18 on five charges including entering a restricted building and disorderly conduct. Gold admitted entering the Capitol building, saying that she did not know it was illegal to do so and that she did not witness any violence. She said: "I do regret being there," because she was concerned that the controversy would detract from her work with America's Frontline Doctors. In April 2021, Gold told Ted Nugent in an interview that "20 FBI agents" had come to arrest her and that she had been placed on the No Fly List.

In February 2022, Gold pleaded guilty to knowingly and unlawfully "entering and remaining in a restricted building or grounds," (a Class A misdemeanor). She was sentenced to 60 days in prison and a $9,500 fine. She served her sentence at a federal prison in Miami, and was released on September 9, 2022. Ignoring her guilty plea, upon her release, Congressman Louie Gohmert gifted her a flag that flew over the United States Capitol and falsely called her "a political prisoner."

On January 20, 2025, the first day of the second presidency of Donald Trump, Gold was pardoned along with nearly every other participant in the Capitol riot.

=== Child vaccination lawsuit ===
On May 21, 2021, Gold and America's Frontline Doctors sued the United States Department of Health and Human Services in an attempt to prevent children from receiving COVID-19 vaccines. The 80-page petition, filed in the United States District Court for the Northern District of Alabama, calls the vaccines "experimental injections" and falsely claims COVID-19 presents "zero risk" of death to children. Regarding the petition, Gold said "We doctors are pro-vaccine, but this is not a vaccine. This is an experimental biological agent whose harms are well documented (although suppressed and censored) and growing rapidly, and we will not support using America's children as guinea pigs."

=== Other events ===
Gold was a speaker at AMPFest, a pro-Trump event held in Miami in October 2020. She spoke at an event for donors to the Council for National Policy, a right-wing Christian group, in November 2020. In December 2020, she was part of a summit hosted by Turning Point USA, a nonprofit that supports conservative movements on high school and college campuses.

In April 2021, Gold appeared at the "Health and Freedom Conference" at Rhema Bible Church in Broken Arrow, Oklahoma, along with speakers including actor Jim Caviezel, My Pillow CEO Mike Lindell, and attorney L. Lin Wood. Gold and America's Frontline Doctors held an RV tour across the US in May 2021, called the "Uncensored Truth Tour". On the tour, Gold held an event at Legacy Church in Albuquerque, New Mexico, which drew hundreds of guests.

In November 2022 Gold was sued by the America's Frontline Doctors, the non-profit she helped establish. She is accused of using funds from the organization to purchase a $3.6 million dollar home along with other personal expenses. As of May 2023, the case is in mediation.

== Reactions from the medical community ==
Gold has been criticized for her views surrounding the COVID-19 pandemic and vaccines. Jeffrey Koplan, an epidemiologist, vice president for Global Health at Emory University, and former head of the Centers for Disease Control and Prevention, said, "She and her organization show a willful ignorance of science and the scientific method, as well as a disrespect for accomplished scientific institutions and brilliant scientists." Director of Columbia University's Pandemic Resource and Response Initiative Irwin Redlener called Gold a "toxic purveyor of misinformation, now actively contributing to rightwing extremist rhetoric that continues to rile up people determined to hang on to the most egregious Donald Trump lies."

== Personal life ==
Gold was married to businessman Larry Gold until they divorced in 2010. The couple had two children. With her husband, Gold was active in Los Angeles's Jewish community and donated thousands of dollars to their children's Jewish private school, where she was a member of the parent–teacher association.

For the majority of her life, Gold was not involved in politics. In 2011, she donated to the campaign of Raul Ruiz, a California Democrat, and in 2019 donated $1,000 to the campaign of Susan Collins, a Maine Republican. According to Gold, "I'd fall in the middle of any partisan test. I don't believe in the right–left distinction... That's the trouble with being in the middle of the road. Sometimes you get run over."

== Publications ==
In 2020, Gold published the book I Do Not Consent: My Fight Against Medical Cancel Culture, detailing her experiences with COVID-19 patients and sharing her opinions about the pandemic.

== See also ==
- Alternative medicine
- Criminal proceedings in the January 6 United States Capitol attack
- List of cases of the January 6 United States Capitol attack (G-L)
- List of people granted executive clemency in the second Trump presidency
- Pseudoscience
