= America's Frontline Doctors =

Right wing, anti-science political group

- Formation: 2019
- Leader: Simone Gold
- Parent organization: Free Speech Foundation
- Website: americasfrontlinedoctors.com

America's Frontline Doctors (AFLDS) is an American right-wing political organization. Affiliated with Tea Party Patriots co-founder Jenny Beth Martin and publicly led by Simone Gold, the group promoted misinformation related to the COVID-19 pandemic, and opposed mitigation measures such as business closures, stay-at-home orders, and vaccines.

AFLDS made its first public appearance during a media event on July 27, 2020, where they advocated for the use of repurposed drugs such as hydroxychloroquine as treatments for COVID-19. Their statements were made without the support of peer-reviewed evidence or regulatory approval, and the group also alleged that the pharmaceutical industry was intentionally sponsoring studies showing the drugs to be ineffective. Video of the event was distributed via right-wing websites and social media outlets, and also promoted by then-U.S. president Donald Trump and his son.

In 2021, AFLDS shifted to anti-vaccine activism with the rollout of COVID-19 vaccines; the group made false claims about the vaccines' efficacy and safety, and began to promote paid telehealth consultations with "AFLDS-trained" physicians that would prescribe medications it promoted as COVID-19 treatments (such as ivermectin). It also filed lawsuits in attempts to block an expansion of the Emergency Use Authorization (EUA) for one of the vaccines, and to block a proof of vaccination mandate in New York City under a claim that it was inherently discriminatory against African Americans.

== History ==
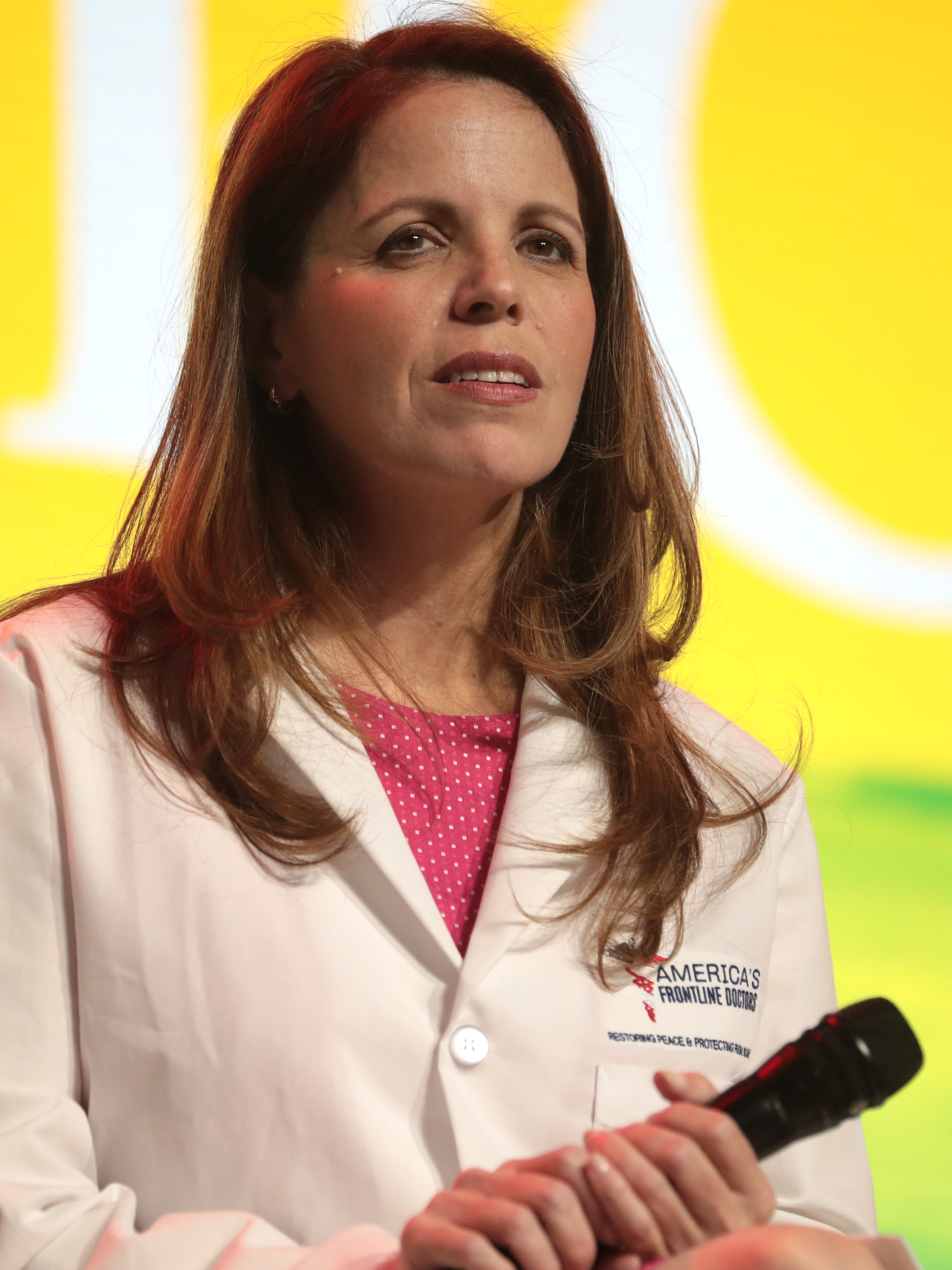
Simone Gold, the group's founder and leader, speaking at Turning Point USA's 2020 Student Action Summit

=== Formation and precursors ===
Although it is described by its founders as a "grassroots" organization, America's Frontline Doctors has a connection to the Council for National Policy (CNP)—a conservative advocacy and networking group, and the Tea Party Patriots.

In opposition to measures to control the COVID-19 pandemic such as business closures and lockdowns, the CNP formed a coalition in late-April 2020 known as "Save Our Country". The group's leadership included FreedomWorks' Adam Brandon, Tea Party Patriots co-founder Jenny Beth Martin, Stephen Moore, and Lisa Nelson of the American Legislative Exchange Council (ALEC). In a press release announcing the coalition, Martin argued that "the long-term consequences of a prolonged societal shutdown outweigh the damage done by the virus itself." As part of the coalition, FreedomWorks and the Tea Party Patriots promoted anti-lockdown protests.

In May 2020, a conference call by the CNP's lobbying arm was leaked by the Center for Media and Democracy, which included CNP president William Walton, Mercedes Schlapp—a senior advisor for Donald Trump's 2020 re-election campaign, and Nancy Schulze—wife of retired congressman Richard T. Schulze. During the call, Schulze disclosed that a coalition of doctors was being created to pursue their push to "reopen" the economy; she argued that they had a high degree of trust, that the left had a tendency to "appreciate and listen to" science, and that "we have doctors that have the facts, that lived this themselves, that are in the trenches, that are saying it's time to reopen." Schlapp remarked that they were "the type of guys we want to get out on TV and radio to help push out the message."

On May 19, 2020, the coalition—A Doctor a Day—published an open letter to President Trump with Simone Gold as lead signatory, which argued that lockdowns themselves were a "mass casualty incident", and that "it is impossible to overstate the short, medium, and long-term harm to people's health with a continued shutdown." During a White House meeting on schools in early-July, Martin publicly called for schools to be reopened in the fall, and told Trump that she had "been in touch with almost a thousand doctors from around the country", and had "helped" Gold with the aforementioned open letter. A clip of her remarks went viral on conservative media outlets, often without any reference to Martin or her affiliations.

In media appearances leading up to July 27, 2020 (including Whiskey Politics and The Charlie Kirk Show), Gold promoted various forms of COVID-19 misinformation, including claims surrounding the efficacy of hydroxychloroquine as a therapeutic, that there was no scientific basis for mandating face masks in public spaces, and that death certificates were being falsified by physicians to artificially increase the number of COVID-19-related deaths.

=== White Coat Summit and other activities ===
On July 27, 2020, the Tea Party Patriots hosted and funded a press conference in front of the Supreme Court Building in Washington, D.C. Billed as the "White Coat Summit", it featured a group led by Gold that referred to themselves as "America's Frontline Doctors". The group claimed that a cocktail of hydroxychloroquine, Zithromax, and zinc could be used as a "cure" for COVID-19, and that public health measures such as lockdowns, social distancing, and mask mandates were therefore unnecessary. None of these drugs have been approved by the FDA or other regulators as therapeutics for COVID-19, and the claims were made without peer-reviewed evidence

One of the speakers, Stella Immanuel, said that she herself had treated and cured 350 COVID-19 patients using the aforementioned cocktail, and referred to doctors refusing to use hydroxychloroquine as being like the "good Germans who allow the Nazis to kill the Jews." They also accused "fake pharma companies" of sponsoring studies that found hydroxychloroquine to be ineffective against COVID-19.

The event was live streamed by Breitbart News, and video of the event was shared on social media platforms, such as Facebook groups dedicated to anti-vaccination and conspiracy movements, and on Twitter—where Donald Trump (who had also promoted the drugs) and his son Donald Trump Jr. both shared versions of the video. Citing policies against COVID-19 misinformation, Facebook, Twitter, and YouTube began to delete posts of the video. It was estimated that posts of the video on Facebook had reached over 14 million views before the takedown. Twitter restricted the account of Trump Jr. for 12 hours after he uploaded a version of the video to his account.

When asked about the video, Trump referred to the group as being "very respected doctors", and referred to Immanuel as "spectacular". When asked why he trusted Immanuel despite her history of promoting conspiracies (such as alien DNA being used as part of medical treatments), Trump replied, "I thought she was very impressive, in the sense that, from where she came — I don't know what country she comes from — but she said that she's had tremendous success with hundreds of different patients." Following the event, Gold said that she had been fired from her position as an emergency room physician at two hospitals.

After the 2021 United States Capitol attack in January 2021, Gold, as well as AFLDS communications director Jason Strand, were both arrested for their participation in the insurrection; Gold plead guilty, and was sentenced to 60 days in prison and a $9,500 fine. After his election to a second term, Trump pardoned nearly all defendants charged for participating in the attack on January 20, 2025, including Gold.

=== Anti-vaccination activity ===
By January 2021, AFLDS had shifted to anti-vaccine activities and promoting misinformation about COVID-19 vaccines. The group has referred to the vaccines as "experimental biological agents", falsely claimed they were "not effective in treating or preventing" COVID-19, and falsely contended that the vaccines were responsible for 45,000 deaths (a claim based on raw data from the Vaccine Adverse Event Reporting System, which relies on unverified, public submissions). The group has opposed mandating or "forcing" the use of "experimental vaccines", and published a white paper with false claims surrounding the safety of the vaccines, which recommended the use of "early or prophylactic treatment" using "established medications".

In May 2021, AFLDS filed a lawsuit against the U.S. Department of Health and Human Services (HHS) in the United States District Court for the Northern District of Alabama, seeking a restraining order to prevent the expansion of the Emergency Use Authorization (EUA) for the Pfizer vaccine to children under 16. The suit cited AFLDS's previous claims surrounding the safety and efficacy of the vaccines, and additionally alleged that the vaccines had a higher risk of harming children than COVID-19 itself. Scott Jensen, a former member of the Minnesota Senate and Republican candidate for governor of Minnesota, was a plaintiff on the lawsuit.

The organization has also targeted African Americans, citing the Tuskegee Syphilis Study as a justification for vaccine hesitancy among the population, and having collaborated with social media influencer Kevin Jenkins and author Angela Stanton-King. In September 2021, AFLDS filed a lawsuit against the New York City government, aiming to overturn its proof of vaccination mandate. The suit argued that the mandate was inherently discriminatory against African Americans due to the "historical context", and thus violated the city's human rights law.

On December 8, 2021, President of the Medical Board of California Kristina Lawson published accusations that she had been stalked by a group of people who identified themselves as members of AFLDS, stating that they had spied on her and her children outside her home, followed her to work, and ambushed her in a parking garage "with cameras and recording equipment" as she was preparing to leave. When confronted by law enforcement, the group claimed that they were seeking an interview with Lawson. She stated that "the private investigator traveling with them told law enforcement they are producing a video about me that will include footage of my house and neighborhood, and, of course, me."

=== SpeakWithAnMD ===
America's Frontline Doctors is affiliated with SpeakWithAnMD, a telehealth website run by conspiracy theorist Jerome Corsi. It primarily distributes drugs that have been claimed by right-wing figures to be therapeutics for COVID-19, such as ivermectin. When referred via the AFLDS website, the site charges US$90 for a doctor consultation with an "AFLDS-trained" physician, which is provided by Encore Telemedicine. Orders are then fulfilled via the online pharmacy Ravkoo, which is charged on top of the consulting fee and can vary.

Hundreds of customers and donors accused the organization of charging fees for ivermectin prescriptions and consultations but failing to deliver, as well as referring customers to online pharmacies that charged excessive prices for the common anti-parasitic drug, which has also not been approved by the FDA or other regulators as a therapeutic for COVID-19.

In September 2021, based on data leaked from an anonymous breach of Cadence Health and Ravkoo, The Intercept estimated that AFLDS and its partners had made $6.7 million in revenue from these consultations between July 16 and September 12, 2021.

== Litigation ==
On November 4, 2022, AFLDS filed a lawsuit against Gold, accusing her of misappropriation of funds to buy and rent property for herself, purchase vehicles for personal use, fund a housekeeper and a personal security detail, and other unspecified personal expenses. The lawsuit also accused her of tortious interference, claiming that she was attempting to "take back control of AFLDS and restore herself into a leadership role with the organization".

In February 2023, AFLDS and a Henderson, Nevada-based doctor were sued for wrongful death, following the death of a patient who had been prescribed hydroxychloroquine based on the influence of AFLDS advocacy.

== Organization ==
The group is registered in Arizona as the Free Speech Foundation; Time found that its charitable status in the state had been listed as "pending inactive", and that the group had never made any financial disclosures.

== See also ==
- Caduceus as a symbol of medicine
- Misinformation related to vaccination
