= The Contender season 1 =

The Contender
- Season 1
- No. of episodes: 15

Release
- Original network: NBC
- Original release: March 7 – May 24, 2005

Season chronology
- Next → The Contender 2

The Contender 1 is the first season of The Contender.

== Contestants ==
The West Coast wear gold, and the East Coast blue. Much of the equipment is being provided by Everlast.

West Coast Team

- Alfonso Gomez
- Anthony "The Bullet" Bonsante
- Ishe "Sugar Shay" Smith
- Jesse "The Body" Brinkley
- Joey Gilbert
- Miguel Espino
- Sergio "The Latin Snake" Mora
- Tarick "The Arabian Prince" Salmaci

East Coast Team

- Ahmed "Babyface" Khaddour
- Brent "The Disciple" Cooper
- Jeff "The Hell Raza" Fraza
- Jimmy Lange
- Jonathan "Reid Dawg" Reid
- Juan "El Gallo Negro" de la Rosa
- Najai "Nitro" Turpin
- Peter "The Pride of Providence" Manfredo Jr.

== Tournament Tracker ==
While The Contender is a reality TV show, it does contain a serious competition with a proper format – a 16-man knockout tournament.

=== Preliminary round ===
1. Alfonso (W) beat Peter (E) on points. (Peter re-entered the competition after Jeff was removed due to illness.)
2. Jesse (W) beat Jonathan (E) on points.
3. Ishe (W) beat Ahmed (E) on points. (Ahmed re-entered the competition after Juan left due to injury.)
4. Sergio (W) beat Najai (E) on points
5. Peter (E) beat Miguel (W) on points.
6. Anthony (W) beat Brent (E) by knockout. (Brent was declared unfit to continue.)
7. Juan (E) beat Tarick (W) on points.(Juan was injured making him unable to continue in the tournament.)
8. Joey (W) beat Jimmy (E) on points.

(Numbers refer to the episode in which the fight took place.)

=== Quarter finals ===
Quarterfinal bouts are determined by the individual winner of each challenge. The winner can choose whom he wants to fight, or become the "matchmaker" and select two fighters to compete against each other.

9. Sergio beat Ishe on points.
10. Alfonso beat Ahmed on points.
11. Peter beat Joey on points. (Fight stopped in 5th due to accidental headbutt.)
12. Jesse beat Anthony by knock-out. (Although Anthony was still conscious.)

(Numbers refer to the episode in which the fight took place.)

=== Semi finals ===
These two matches took place between the four remaining boxers, Sergio, Alfonso, Peter, Jesse.

13. Peter beat Alfonso on points.
14. Sergio beat Jesse on points.

(Numbers refer to the episode in which the fight took place.) On the final night in Las Vegas, Alfonso Gomez took on Jesse Brinkley for 200,000 prize. Alfonso was in better shape and connected better punches.

=== The Finale ===
For $1,000,000, from Caesars Palace, Las Vegas.

15. Sergio beat Peter on points.
(For third place, Alfonso beat Jesse on points.)

(Number refers to the episode in which the fight took place.)

==== Fans Favorite Fights ====
These three bouts were staged as warm-up events for the final.

Jimmy beat Tarick on points.
Ishe beat Anthony.
Jeff beat Brent.

=== Guest appearances ===
- Cedric Ceballos
- Tony Danza
- Angelo Dundee
- Matt Stone and Trey Parker
- George Foreman
- Mel Gibson
- Ja Rule
- Dr. Drew
- Jay Leno
- Chuck Norris
- Burt Reynolds
- William Shatner
- Meg Ryan and Omar Epps to promote Against the Ropes
- Bill Goldberg
- Lewis White
- Tom Bei
- Mr. Met
- Mr. T
- Danny Green
- Vic Darchinyan
- Jason Sehorn
- Micky Ward

== Weekly results ==
Elimination Chart
Contestant	1	2	3	4	5	6	7	8	9	10	11	12	13	14	15
Sergio	IN	IN	IN	WIN	IN	IN	IN	IN	WIN	IN	IN	IN	IN	WIN	WIN
Peter	LOSE	Not in arena (re-enter week 4)		IN	WIN	IN	IN	IN	IN	IN	WIN	IN	WIN	IN	LOSE
Jesse	IN	WIN	IN	IN	IN	IN	IN	IN	IN	IN	IN	WIN	IN	LOSE	
Alfonso	WIN	IN	IN	IN	IN	IN	IN	IN	IN	WIN	IN	IN	LOSE		
Anthony	IN	IN	IN	IN	IN	WIN	IN	IN	IN	IN	IN	LOSE			
Joey	IN	IN	IN	IN	IN	IN	IN	WIN	IN	IN	LOSE				
Ahmed	IN	IN	LOSE	Not in arena (re-enter week 9)					IN	LOSE					
Ishe	IN	IN	WIN	IN	IN	IN	IN	IN	LOSE						
Juan	IN	IN	IN	IN	IN	IN	WIN	QUIT							
Jimmy	IN	IN	IN	IN	IN	IN	IN	LOSE							
Tarick	IN	IN	IN	IN	IN	IN	LOSE								
Brent	IN	IN	IN	IN	IN	LOSE									
Miguel	IN	IN	IN	IN	LOSE										
Najai	IN	IN	IN	LOSE											
Jeff	IN	IN	IN	QUIT											
Jonathan	IN	LOSE													

Navy means the boxer won the team challenge and the match.
Cornflower blue means the boxer lost the team challenge and won the match.
Light blue means the boxer won the match.
Cyan means the team won the challenge.
Tomato means the boxer lost the match.
Red means the boxer won the team challenge and lost the match.
Dark red means the boxer lost the team challenge and the match.
Gray means the boxer quit the competition.
