= Ishe Smith =

American boxer (born 1978)

Personal information
- Nickname: Sugar Shay
- Born: Ishé Oluwa Kamau Ali Smith; July 22, 1978 (age 48) Las Vegas, Nevada, U.S.
- Height: 5 ft 10 in (178 cm)
- Weight: Welterweight; Light middleweight; Middleweight

Boxing career
- Reach: 71 in (180 cm)
- Stance: Orthodox

Boxing record
- Total fights: 40
- Wins: 29
- Win by KO: 12
- Losses: 11

Ishé Oluwa Kamau Ali Smith (/ˈiːʃeɪ/ EE-shay; born July 22, 1978) is an American former professional boxer who competed from 2000 to 2019. He held the IBF junior middleweight title in 2013, and is the first boxer from Las Vegas to become a professional world champion. During his early career, he participated in the first season of the reality TV show The Contender in 2005.

== Early life and education ==
Smith grew up in Nevada with his mother and siblings but never knew his father. As an amateur Smith competed on the national stage for years. In 1996 he made it to the finals of the US National Championships, losing a competitive match on points to Héctor Camacho Jr., and semifinals of the U.S. Olympic trials, losing on points to Zab Judah. In 1999, he lost on points in another close bout in the quarterfinals of the US National Championships to Larry Mosley, who went on to win the tournament.

== Professional career ==
Smith was a strong prospect early in his career, he won his first fourteen fights while facing generally strong opposition. In 2001, he faced Alfonso Gomez in his fourth pro fight (Alfonso's second pro fight). Smith won via a controversial unanimous decision (due to a low-blow penalty against Gomez that was poorly called) in a four-round fight. Later that year, he beat Norberto Bravo by unanimous decision. Most notably, in 2003 he dominated David "King" Estrada, a fellow hot prospect at the time, beating him by a wide unanimous decision.

In 2004, Smith won his first belts (WBC Continental Welterweight title, WBO NABO Welterweight title, and USBA Welterweight title), beating the former world champion Randall Bailey by a controversial unanimous decision. In an economical punching fight, Smith scored a knockdown in the second round and showed better defense, but Bailey was a bit more active throughout, particularly in the last three rounds with an effective jab. There was little to separate the two men in terms of scoring the fight, but Smith won by scores of 116–111, 117–110, and 114–113.

=== The Contender ===
The Contender results
Round	Result	Opponent
First round	Win (points)	Kaddour
Quarter Finals	Loss (points)	Mora
Fans Favorite	Win (points)	Bonsante

Ishe took a chance and signed on to do The Contender reality show. On the show, he was placed on the West Coast team and fought his rival Ahmed Kaddour in the third episode's fight. Smith won by unanimous decision against Kaddour in a tough fight. Smith criticized Anthony Bonsante for fighting Brent Cooper, whom he did not think was an appropriate competitor. Their bout had no bearing on Smith's standing in the competition.

When Juan de la Rosa was medically disqualified at the end of the first round fight, certain other boxers bought back Kaddour, a tactic employed to get under Smith's skin. After Jesse Brinkley criticized Smith for speaking his mind too often, Brinkley selected Smith to go against Sergio Mora. Mora won over Smith in a split decision and was the tournament's eventual winner.

Smith faced his nemesis Bonsante in a "Fan Favorite Fight." Despite suffering many illegal moves from a desperate Bonsante, Smith won by a wide unanimous decision.

Some of Smith's earlier challengers in the ring also appeared on The Contender, namely, Norberto Bravo and Alfonso Gomez, who was assigned as a roommate to Smith.

=== Post-Contender ===
Since appearing on The Contender, Smith has criticized the show's management company for trying to force him to fight Brinkley at a severe weight disadvantage for a relatively small fight purse. A natural welterweight, Smith feels that he should have been allowed to drop back down to a lower weight class and fight more rounds against opponents outside The Contender in preparation for an eventual title shot, or be allowed out of the show's management contract as Contender contestants Ahmed Kaddour and Jimmy Lange, among others, have been.

Smith won his arbitration trial. He left the Contender promotions and signed a contract with Oscar De La Hoya's Golden Boy Promotions. Smith has been under Bernard Hopkins' guidance since joining that company.

Smith was featured on a June 7, 2006, fight card promoted by Bernard Hopkins on ESPN Friday Night Fight, where he dominated his opponent Patrick Thompson through 10 rounds to get a unanimous decision. He fought at 154 lbs, in the junior middleweight division, which is considered a division with many opportunities for young prospects.

Smith fought Sechew Powell, a junior middleweight contender on February 17, 2007, and lost a unanimous decision, potentially halting his hopes of landing a title shot. Smith lost the fight despite scoring a knock down. After the decision was announced, many of Powell's hometown fans booed the decision. The judges gave Powell eight out of ten rounds. The fight was very slow as neither man wanted to let his hands go much, so the booing may have been for the lackluster nature of the fight.

Smith lost a razor-close decision to Joel Julio on April 30, 2008. Julio outworked Smith in the early rounds of the fight, but Smith came on strong in the 2nd half of the fight to make it interesting. Julio went on to lose his next two fights, one by TKO.

Smith returned to the ring on August 1, 2008, winning by unanimous decision over the previously undefeated Pawel Wolak. Describing the bout for him as "a do or die, must win situation", he delivered, outboxing the somewhat plodding Wolak in one of his most consistent performances. He followed that with a workmanlike unanimous decision win over Chris Gray in a stay-busy fight.

Smith lost to Danny Jacobs on August 22, 2009, but he had his moments in the fight and was definitely crowd pleasing. Smith had moved up to Middleweight to challenge Jacobs. Smith vowed to go back to Jr Middleweight and make a run at the title, but his next fight was again at middleweight July 16, 2010, in Memphis, Tennessee against Fernando Guerrero, an explosive southpaw Middleweight prospect.

Smith and Guerrero fought on ShoBox in a ten-round competitive action affair. For the first half of the fight, Guerrero seemed to have a slight edge, as he outlanded and outworked Smith; the latter used many body shots, some being low, resulting in him losing a point. The tide turned heavily in Smith's favor in Round 8; he dropped Guerrero with a strong right hand at the end of the round. Smith had a very strong Round 9 and a good Round 10, though Guerrero had his moments in the final round as well. Though it appeared the scores could have gone either way by the end of the fight and Smith closed strong, Guerrero won 96–93, 95–93, and a surprising score of 97–91. Smith said afterward that he would like to return to Light Middleweight to make a run and/or get a fight with Julio César Chávez, Jr.

Soon after the Guerrero fight, Smith took a stay-busy fight which he easily won. He went on a long layoff, during which he stayed in the news mostly doing various boxing mailbags: commenting on the sport for websites such as BoxingScene and BoxingTalk. He also did sparring work for various camps. After more than a year and a half layoff, Smith returned to the ring in May 2012 against Ayi Bruce, winning easily via 4th-round TKO at 154 lbs, and then September 8 won all 10 rounds on 2 cards and 9 of 10 on the 3rd card vs Irving Garcia for his 2nd straight 154 lb division victory, earning him his first world title challenge for Contender Season 2 Bronze medalist Cornelius Bundrage's IBF 154 lb belt scheduled February 23, 2013.

=== IBF junior middleweight champion ===
On February 23, 2013, Ishe Smith won a majority decision victory over Cornelius Bundrage to become the new IBF junior middleweight champion. On September 14, 2013, Smith lost his title to Carlos Molina by split decision. Many commentators regarded the fight as a humdrum affair lacking any meaningful action, specifically on Smith's part. Two judges scored the bout 116-112 and 117-111 for Molina and one of the judges scored the bout 116-112 for Ishe.

Originally, Smith was supposed to face Erislandy Lara, but ultimately ended up facing Ryan Davis on May 2, 2014, after Lara elected to instead challenge Saúl "Canelo" Álvarez directly. Smith knocked Davis out at the end of the second round.

== Professional boxing record ==
40 fights	29 wins	11 losses
By knockout	12	1
By decision	17	10

No.	Result	Record	Opponent	Type	Round, time	Date	Location	Notes
40	Loss	29–11	Erickson Lubin	RTD	3 (10), 3:00	Feb 9, 2019	Dignity Health Sports Park, Carson, California, U.S.	
39	Loss	29–10	Tony Harrison	SD	10	May 11, 2018	Sam's Town Hotel & Gambling Hall, Paradise, Nevada, U.S.	
38	Loss	29–9	Julian Williams	UD	10	Nov 18, 2017	Cosmopolitan of Las Vegas, Paradise, Nevada, U.S.	
37	Win	29–8	Frank Galarza	MD	10	Sep 16, 2016	Cosmopolitan of Las Vegas, Paradise, Nevada, U.S.	
36	Win	28–8	Tommy Rainone	UD	10	Dec 18, 2015	Pearl Concert Theater, Paradise, Nevada, U.S.	
35	Loss	27–8	Vanes Martirosyan	MD	10	Sep 12, 2015	MGM Grand Garden Arena, Paradise, Nevada, U.S.	
34	Win	27–7	Cecil McCalla	UD	10	Apr 30, 2015	Pearl Concert Theater, Paradise, Nevada, U.S.	
33	Loss	26–7	Erislandy Lara	UD	12	Dec 12, 2014	Alamodome, San Antonio, Texas, U.S.	For WBA (Regular) light middleweight title
32	Win	26–6	Ryan Davis	KO	2 (10), 2:59	May 2, 2014	The Joint, Paradise, Nevada, U.S.	
31	Loss	25–6	Carlos Molina	SD	12	Sep 14, 2013	MGM Grand Garden Arena, Paradise, Nevada, U.S.	Lost IBF light middleweight title
30	Win	25–5	Cornelius Bundrage	MD	12	Feb 23, 2013	Masonic Temple, Detroit, Michigan, U.S.	Won IBF light middleweight title
29	Win	24–5	Irving Garcia	UD	10	Sep 8, 2012	The Joint, Paradise, Nevada, U.S.	
28	Win	23–5	Ayi Bruce	TKO	4 (10), 2:10	May 4, 2012	The Joint, Paradise, Nevada, U.S.	
27	Win	22–5	Alexander Pacheco Quiroz	RTD	2 (8), 3:00	Nov 5, 2010	Scheels Arena, Fargo, North Dakota, U.S.	
26	Loss	21–5	Fernando Guerrero	UD	10	Jul 16, 2010	DeSoto Civic Center, Southaven, Mississippi, U.S.	For vacant NABF middleweight title
25	Loss	21–4	Daniel Jacobs	UD	10	Aug 22, 2009	Toyota Center, Houston, Texas, U.S.	For vacant NABO middleweight title
24	Win	21–3	Chris Gray	UD	6	May 8, 2009	Plaza Hotel & Casino, Las Vegas, Nevada, U.S.	
23	Win	20–3	Paweł Wolak	UD	10	Aug 1, 2008	Aviator Sports and Events Center, New York City, New York, U.S.	
22	Loss	19–3	Joel Julio	UD	10	Apr 30, 2008	River Rock Casino Resort, Richmond, British Columbia, Canada	
21	Win	19–2	Carlos De La Cruz	TKO	2 (6)	Feb 8, 2008	Miccosukee Resort & Gaming, Miami, Florida, U.S.	
20	Loss	18–2	Sechew Powell	UD	10	Feb 17, 2007	Hammerstein Ballroom, New York City, New York, U.S.	
19	Win	18–1	Óscar González	TKO	2 (10), 2:55	Aug 25, 2006	Desert Diamond Casino, Tucson, Arizona, U.S.	
18	Win	17–1	Patrick Thompson	UD	10	Jun 7, 2006	Borgata, Atlantic City, New Jersey, U.S.	
17	Win	16–1	Anthony Bonsante	UD	5	May 24, 2005	Caesars Palace, Paradise, Nevada, U.S.	
16	Loss	15–1	Sergio Mora	SD	5	Sep 12, 2004	Contender Gymnasium, Pasadena, California, U.S.	The Contender: quarter-final
15	Win	15–0	Ahmad Kaddour	UD	5	Aug 24, 2004	Contender Gymnasium, Pasadena, California, U.S.	The Contender: preliminary round
14	Win	14–0	Randall Bailey	UD	12	Jan 15, 2004	Chumash Casino Resort, Santa Ynez, California, U.S.	Won vacant WBC Continental Americas, USBA, and NABO welterweight titles
13	Win	13–0	David Estrada	UD	10	Jul 31, 2003	Kewadin Casino, Sault Ste. Marie, Michigan, U.S.	
12	Win	12–0	Sal Lopez	TKO	2 (10), 2:31	Jun 20, 2003	Home Depot Center, Carson, California, U.S.	
11	Win	11–0	Sam Garr	UD	10	Apr 24, 2003	Grand Casino, Gulfport, Mississippi, U.S.	
10	Win	10–0	Edson Madrid	KO	1 (6), 1:25	Dec 27, 2002	The Orleans, Paradise, Nevada, U.S.	
9	Win	9–0	Gerry Balagbagan	UD	6	Oct 18, 2002	The Orleans, Paradise, Nevada, U.S.	
8	Win	8–0	Charles Blake	TKO	2 (8), 2:58	Jul 26, 2002	The Orleans, Paradise, Nevada, U.S.	
7	Win	7–0	Michael Soberanis	UD	4	May 17, 2002	The Orleans, Paradise, Nevada, U.S.	
6	Win	6–0	Norberto Bravo	UD	6	Dec 28, 2001	The Orleans, Paradise, Nevada, U.S.	
5	Win	5–0	Sean Holley	TKO	3 (4), 2:43	Oct 19, 2001	The Orleans, Paradise, Nevada, U.S.	
4	Win	4–0	Alfonso Gómez	UD	4	Jun 15, 2001	The Orleans, Paradise, Nevada, U.S.	
3	Win	3–0	Tony Sanza	TKO	1 (4), 0:55	May 18, 2001	The Orleans, Paradise, Nevada, U.S.	
2	Win	2–0	Steve Verdin	KO	1 (4), 0:41	Sep 9, 2000	New Orleans Arena, New Orleans, Louisiana, U.S.	
1	Win	1–0	Jose Meraz	TKO	3 (4), 2:59	Jul 29, 2000	Grand Casino, Tunica, Mississippi, U.S.	

Sporting positions
Regional boxing titles
Vacant Title last held by Miguel Angel Rodriguez	WBC Continental Americas welterweight champion January 15, 2004 – August 2004; Vacated	Vacant Title next held by Mauro Lucero
Vacant Title last held by Cory Spinks	IBF–USBA welterweight champion January 15, 2004 – July 2004; Vacated	Vacant Title next held by David Estrada
Vacant Title last held by José Celaya	WBO–NABO welterweight champion January 15, 2004 – August 2004; Vacated	Vacant Title next held by Mark Suárez
World boxing titles
Preceded by Cornelius Bundrage	IBF junior middleweight champion February 23, 2013 – September 14, 2013	Succeeded by Carlos Molina
