= Alfonso Gómez =

American boxer

Personal information
- Born: Alfonso Salvador Gómez Becerra; October 28, 1980 (age 46) Guadalajara, Jalisco, Mexico
- Height: 5 ft 9 in (1.75 m)
- Weight: Light welterweight Welterweight; Light middleweight

Boxing career
- Reach: 69 in (175 cm)
- Stance: Orthodox

Boxing record
- Total fights: 33
- Wins: 25
- Win by KO: 12
- Losses: 6
- Draws: 2
- No contests: 0

Alfonso Salvador Gómez Becerra (born October 28, 1980), better known as Alfonso Gómez, is a Mexican former professional boxer. Gomez is best known for being a competitor on the debut season of reality TV show The Contender, where he finished third out of sixteen fighters and instantly became a fan favorite. Gómez holds notable victories over former world champions Arturo Gatti, Jose Luis Castillo, and Peter Manfredo Jr. He has also fought household names such as Saul Álvarez, Miguel Cotto in a WBO world championship fight, and Shawn Porter.

== Personal life ==
Gómez was born in Guadalajara, Jalisco, Mexico, but his parents subsequently moved to the city of Oakland, California, where his boxing career began as a self-defense class due to constant bullying. He then moved to Napa, CA where he graduated from Napa High School. After graduating, him and his family moved to Southern California to explore better boxing opportunities and to enter college in Irvine. He has two brothers, Jesus Zeuz and Roberto Robb, who are part of a local Spanish hip hop group called Hy3rid H3. He now lives in Long Beach, CA and has two children, his daughter Heidi Luna Gomez and his son, Leon Harel Gomez.

== Professional career ==
Coming off a strong amateur career where he represented Mexico in the quarterfinals of the 2000 Olympic Qualifying Tournament for the Americas, Alfonso Gomez turned pro in 2001, and was used by his first few managers as a stepping stone fighter for hotter-looking prospects. Alfonso knew the disadvantages in each fight as a "stepping stone" so he trained extra hard to prove himself. After winning a few fights against undefeated protected fighters in which he was supposed to lose, the media nicknamed him, "The Executioner of the Undefeated," and the real-life story of the "True Underdog" began.

=== The Contender ===
In 2004, Alfonso got on the boxing reality TV show The Contender as an alternate for a chance to win one million dollars, though he had to fight above his natural weight(Welterweight) at Middleweight due to the show's weight class choice. On the show, he was placed on the West Coast team (as was Ishe Smith) and he challenged the highly ranked Peter Manfredo in the first fight in a surprising move after Joey Gilbert seemed reluctant to take the first fight of the show against the undersized Jeff Fraza. With the exception of Ishe and Alfonso himself, both teams were skeptical as to Alfonso's chances, but Alfonso beat the then-undefeated Rhode Islander in a shocking fight where he outhustled, outboxed, and outfought Manfredo over five rounds, sending him home, though Peter was brought back later on the show due to Jeff Fraza contracting a case of chicken pox.

In the quarterfinals, he beat the confident Ahmed Kaddour (who had been brought back in to replace Juan de la Rosa and as a thinly veiled attempt by Manfredo, Brinkley, Gilbert, and Bonsante to psych out Ishe Smith) by unanimous decision in a tough matchup that Manfredo was allowed to make as the challenge winner of the week at the time. Gomez outworked Kaddour the first 3 rounds, coming in off his jab and straight right, followed by hard body shots, throwing twice as many punches as Kaddour the first two rounds, absorbing punishment throughout the fight but consistently pushing the pace. Kaddour fought in hard flurries, landing the harder shots throughout the fight, especially the right hand lead and left hook knocking Gomez back a step or two occasionally stunning him, but then Kaddour would back off and move until ready to stage his next assault. Gomez suffered some pretty bad swelling, especially after walking into full force straight rights and left hooks in the final 2 rounds when their workrate was closer, but Gomez won 48–47 on Marty Denkin's scorecard and 49–46 on Chuck Hassett and Ray Corona's cards.

The Semi-Final round saw Gomez up against Manfredo again. Gómez was still bruised up from his previous fight against Ahmed Kaddour and Manfredo won their rematch by UD in a tough seven round fight. Like their first fight, Gomez seemed to have the advantage after five rounds, but Manfredo seemed fresher in the last two rounds to win the fight, though both landed plenty of punches on each other. Gomez, whose jaw was incredibly swollen after taking much punishment from Kaddour and Manfredo back-to-back, visited Manfredo in the locker room to wish him well moving on.

On the finale show, Gomez defeated fellow semi-final loser Jesse Brinkley, the consensus favorite in their match and hardest single-shot puncher of Season 1, by unanimous decision on May 24, 2005, in the "Bronze match" of the Contender show. Brinkley won the first round of their fight behind a series of stiff jabs and hard right hands, but Gomez won the next two rounds close behind good counter-punching and short combinations. The fourth round had a few swings, as Brinkley came back and dominated the first half of the round landing some huge punches, but Gomez was able to weather the storm and hurt Brinkley to the body badly in the second half of the round and beat him up during the second half to take the round. In the final round, Gomez continued to beat up Jesse until the last ten seconds, when Gomez celebrated his probable win a little prematurely and Brinkley got him with a big right hand at the bell, though Gomez was able to take the punch without being seriously hurt. He may take some consolation from having beaten Brinkley in the 3rd Place Fight, which guaranteed him a nice packet of prize money(200k and a 2005 Toyota Tundra)—and the whole Contender experience catapulted him to a world ranking of 21 out of 861. Even though he did not come out as the overall winner of the show, Gomez probably garnered the largest fan following of the fighters from Season 1.

=== Comeback trail ===
Going back to his original weight class range of Welterweight/Light Middleweight, Gomez fought Luciano Perez in a five-round contest on October 15, 2005, at the Staples Center in Los Angeles on the Contender Rematch card, and won by fourth round TKO. Perez was game, but sorely outclassed in terms of boxing skill and Alfonso landed a high amount of punches on Perez throughout the match until the referee stopped the fight late in Round Four.

Gómez fought Jesse Feliciano for a third time to a draw after a long layoff on May 5, 2006, at the Aladdin Resort in Las Vegas, Nevada, on the Latin Fury card with the Contender Season 1 champion Sergio Mora. The fight was a candidate for Fight of the Year. For most of the first four rounds, Gomez outboxed the rugged Feliciano, but coming off a long layoff and having to move a lot with Feliciano's relentless pressure, Gomez lost his leg stamina at the end of the 4th round and had to bang with Feliciano. Both guys landed tons of leather on each other in the following rounds, but Jesse seemingly got the better of the next two rounds. In the 7th and 8th rounds, Gómez seemed to get a second wind as he got some of his legs back and seemed to edge the last two rounds, but Feliciano still landed on him a good amount and came forward throughout, making those two rounds debatable. Gómez won 77–75 on one judge's card, but the fight was scored 76–76 on the other two cards, rendering the rubber match between the two a draw.

On August 25, 2006, Gómez fought Carson "Kid" Jones in an eight-round bout at the Arco Arena in Sacramento, CA. He pressured a game Jones throughout and beat him up pretty badly over the eight rounds until the referee stopped the fight in Round Eight. While Jones was clearly losing, it was a quick stoppage as Jones was still able to defend himself to some extent at the time.

Gómez was a part of the American team on The Contender Challenge: UK vs. USA, where he was pitted against the hard-punching Martin Concepcion on March 30, 2007. Alfonso won due to TKO from an uppercut followed by a left hook late in the 7th round after having largely dominated the fight prior to that.

==== Gómez vs Gatti ====
Arturo Gatti needed a decent comeback opponent to determine whether he still had anything in the tank after a tough stoppage loss to Carlos Baldomir a year earlier. HBO gave the Gatti team a list of acceptable opponents and the Gatti team picked Gómez for Gatti to come back against, as Gómez was regarded by the Gatti team as a crude brawler type, a light puncher, and slow. The fight was also meant to be a setup fight for Gatti vs Julio César Chávez Jr. Instead, Gómez defeated the favored Arturo Gatti on July 14, 2007, via 7th-round TKO in a dominant effort, landing right hands repeatedly over Gatti's jab and generally getting off first with his own jab and short combinations to Gatti's head and body. Gatti retired following this match.

==== Gómez vs Tackie ====
Three months later Gomez outpointed Ben Tackie in a unanimous decision in Carson, California on October 16, 2007, where Gómez also broke his right hand in the 2nd round hitting the iron-chinned Tackie with an uppercut. Gómez threw an incredibly high volume of punches in the early rounds despite his injury, outboxing Tackie, but Tackie kept the pressure on throughout and made the last few rounds of the fight hard for Gómez. However, Gómez fought through the pain of his hand and got the clear decision win. The Tackie win was supposed to set up a future match against Julio César Chávez Jr., but the Chávez Jr. team did not want to make the match. Instead, Alfonso got a shot against then WBA Welterweight champion Miguel Cotto, who needed a stay-busy opponent to hype up a possible Antonio Margarito-Cotto match, with Margarito fighting Kermit Cintrón on the same card.

==== World Title Shot ====
Gómez faced and lost against Miguel Cotto via 5th-round TKO on April 12, 2008, after the ring-side doctor declared him unable to continue after receiving constant punishment from Cotto over the five rounds. Alfonso came into the fight with a still injured right hand (broken in the Tackie fight) and after a training camp which he was badly ill at one point so he was not in his best condition in the ring, and Cotto dominated him, landing nearly forty punches a round against him before the ringside doctor stopped the fight prior to the 6th round, though Gomez wanted to continue the fight.

=== Comeback ===
On May 1, 2009, after a long layoff Alfonso Gómez (19-4-2, 9 KOs) stopped Juan Buendia (14-3-1, 8 KOs) in a high action fight with a left hook to the liver in the 8th round, at the Hard Rock Hotel and Casino, Las Vegas. He expressed a desire to fight Julio César Chávez Jr., but Jr. was now hovering around Middleweight so this fight was unlikely to happen.

On August 29, 2009, Gómez scored a first round stoppage of Raul Munoz in Hawaii on a card with Brian Viloria. He hurt Munoz with the first right hand he threw, then poured it on until dropping Munoz with another big right hand-left hook to body-right hand to face combination. Munoz got up in time, but was still damaged from the left hook to the body, and Gomez hit him with a few more punches, including another left hook to the body, and Munoz took a knee and indicated no ability to continue so the referee stopped the fight. This win by Alfonso set up a fight with Jesús Soto-Karass, a solid Top Rank prospect with a long winning streak and a high action style.

On November 14, 2009, Gómez fought against the favored Jesús Soto-Karass on the Manny Pacquiao vs. Miguel Cotto undercard "Firepower" at the MGM Grand. In a reasonably competitive action fight, Gómez outboxed Soto-Karass for the first four rounds of the affair, during which Soto-Karass committed a large multitude of low blow fouls upon Gómez that ultimately cost him two points, and headbutted Gómez badly by accident in the 3rd round, opening a large cut around Gomez's right eye. The cut bled profusely throughout until it necessitated a doctor stoppage in the sixth round of the fight, sending the fight to a Technical decision, which Gómez won 58–54, 57–55(x2). Gómez also attained the vacant WBC Continental Americas Welterweight title as a result of this victory.

Gómez fought José Luis Castillo on the Manny Pacquiao vs. Joshua Clottey undercard on March 13, 2010, at the Cowboys Stadium in Texas. It was pretty much a fight to determine whether Castillo had anything left or not as Castillo came into the fight off a small win streak, but against mostly mediocre competition, with the last solid opponent he faced having beaten him pretty easily in Sebastian Lujan. Gómez outboxed and beat up Castillo for five rounds before Castillo retired in the corner prior to the 6th round. Castillo did not have anything in this fight and announced his retirement immediately after the fight, though he changed his mind a few weeks later. Gómez thanked him for the opportunity in the post-fight press conference and mentioned some of the memories he had of Castillo.

Gómez has always expressed a desire to become a World Champion. He is coached by his father, Alfonso Gómez, Sr and has been managed for some years now by Gary Gittelsohn, who also manages Brian Viloria. Alfonso is now being promoted by Top Rank

==== Potential fight vs. Chávez Jr. ====
On December 4, 2010, Gómez was signed to get the fight he's expressed a desire for many times before, a matchup with the undefeated Julio César Chávez Jr. at Middleweight (the contracted weight was 157) for Chávez Jr.'s WBC Silver Middleweight belt on the In Harm's Way card as the main event. However, during training for the bout Alfonso tore some ligaments in his left elbow and had to withdraw from the card, and will undergo a few months of rehab. For his part, Chávez Jr. was set to fight Powel Wolak as a replacement bout, but after adjusting the weight limit for said match to 165 lbs, Chávez Jr. himself had to pull out due to the flu messing up his training and weight loss.

=== Return ===
Gómez fought and beat Calvin Green via 2nd Round TKO on May 21 at the Morongo Casino in California on a Fox Deportes card for his comeback fight off the injury to his left elbow. Green caught him a few times with hooks in the first round, but Alfonso mostly dominated that round with good counter-punching and combinations to Green's head and body. It was more of the same in Round 2 when Gómez slipped a Green jab midway through the round and countered with a big straight right that got Green in trouble. Gómez went after and cornered Green, threw some more combinations and got another big right hand counter in that forced a stoppage by the referee.

==== Gómez vs Álvarez ====
On September 17, 2011, Alfonso Gómez got another shot at a World Title when he took on Canelo Álvarez for his WBC Light Middleweight title at the Staples Center in Los Angeles. The card was part of the "Star Power" undercard featuring Floyd Mayweather Jr. vs Victor Ortiz and shown as part of a split-site venture.

Gómez and Álvarez got off to a tentative start in Round 1, with Álvarez playing counterpuncher and Gómez playing pressure fighter. The round was close until the very end of it, where Álvarez caught Gómez with a kind of half hook, half jab while Gómez came in on him somewhat off-balance. The punch scored a flash knockdown on Gómez, swinging the round in Álvarez's favor. In Round 2, Gómez picked up the pace and his strategy for fighting Álvarez was apparent, he would come in very low using upper body movement on Álvarez to avoid counters, fire off his jab and throw short combinations to Álvarez's head and body. This strategy proved to be effective as Álvarez was not able to time Gómez and had his offense blunted by Gómez's workrate. Álvarez would slip in a hard shot here and there, but Gómez was outlanding/outworking him by a wide margin and constantly bringing the fight to Álvarez. This pattern continued in Rounds 3 and 4. In the first half of Round 5, Gómez had a good start to the round but Alvarez finished up the round strong letting his hands go a bit more to make the round debatable. In Round 6, both men had their moments, but near the end of the round, Álvarez caught Gómez with a counter right uppercut that stunned Gómez. Gómez went back to the ropes, put his guard up, Álvarez came after him with a flurry of six or seven punches, the majority of which were partially blocked by Gómez, but the relatively unknown referee for the fight Wayne Hedgpeth called the fight in Álvarez's favor after the flurry. By the accounts of the HBO commentary team and general consensus, the stoppage of the fight was very fast as Gómez seemed to be able to defend himself and wasn't that hurt, making the stoppage look fishy. Also, despite seemingly controlling, setting the pace of the fight, and outlanding/outworking Álvarez by a wide margin for the majority of the fight, Gomez as it turned out was losing 49-45 (x2) and 50-44 on the official scorecards prior to the stoppage, while unofficially HBO had the fight a draw. Gómez said after the fight that Alvarez hit pretty hard and was a good counterpuncher, but he felt that the referee was looking for a reason to stop the fight in Álvarez's favor and so he stopped the fight too early. He said he knew something like that could happen with Álvarez's backing and it is what it is. He also stated his plan to go back down to the Welterweight division and try to win a championship there.

=== Gómez vs Vargas ===
On May 5 as part of the undercard for Miguel Cotto vs. Floyd Mayweather Jr. also dubbed "Ring Kings", Alfonso Gómez was to be fighting hot Mayweather Promotions prospect Jessie Vargas in a ten-round Welterweight fight. However, Gómez injured his back in training a couple of weeks prior to the fight and was forced to withdraw from the card, with a fellow former Contender Steve Forbes stepping in as his replacement to fight Vargas. He has stated that he hopes to get the fight with Vargas at a later date.

=== Gómez vs Porter ===
On July 28, 2012, Alfonso Gómez faced off with undefeated Welterweight prospect Shawn Porter as the opener for the Guerrero vs Aydin card in San Jose CA. Porter is best known for being Manny Pacquiao's chief sparring partner to help prepare him against Miguel Cotto back in 2009.

Gómez vs Porter was a great action fight that was possibly a Fight of the Year candidate for 2012. The athletic Porter did well using his handspeed in particular to land combinations on Gómez, being busier and landing more punches throughout the fight, but Gomez returned fire with the cleaner, harder shots throughout, landing some very clean straight rights and left hooks to Porter's body and head, which made most of the rounds tough to call. The fight was a rough one, with both fighters landing a lot of punches and clashing heads multiple times. By the end, Porter had two cuts over his eyes, one being really nasty near the end, and Gómez had pretty bad swelling in terms of the damage they dealt to each other. Shawn Porter won by UD, 96–94, 97–93, and 98–92.

=== Gómez vs Paredes ===
After a near two-year layoff due to injuries and somewhat unlucky circumstances regarding a prospective Victor Ortiz fight, Gomez returned to the ring to face Ed "The Lion" Paredes in a ten-round junior middleweight fight on July 9, 2014, in Las Vegas as the main event of a Fox Sports 1 card. It was a solid action fight and competitive, but Gómez was able to outbox and outfight Paredes over the ten rounds despite suffering two questionable knockdown calls against him by referee Kenny Bayless in Round 4 and Round 6. He won by a wide decision on the cards.

=== Gómez vs Kamegai ===
On March 20, 2015, Alfonso Gómez fought Yoshihiro Kamegai as part of a Fox Sports 1 card at the Fantasy Spring Casino in Indio, California. Kamegai is best known for his action, pressure style and giving Robert Guerrero all he could handle in a slugfest in 2014. The fight was an action packed battle, as predicted by Gomez. Although he had made statements before the fight that he had a new and better adjusted style for himself and not a "typical mexican" style of fighting, Gómez and Kamegai fought toe to toe virtually the entire match. Gómez began leading on points early on, making an effective usage of his jab versus a determined Kamegai who kept absorbing punches and going forward, seeking Gómez' liver. An accidental headbutt mid-fight cost Gómez a point deduction. Gómez' demonstrated superior ring generalship, keeping close to his opponent, and despite Kamegai keeping the pressure on at all times, Gómez was able to administer some spectacular counter punches that saw Kamegai's head literally twisting in the opposite direction. Both boxers appeared more and more tired as the fight went on. At the end of the bout, the unanimous decision by a wide margin was awarded to Gomez, his second win after his recent comeback.

=== Canceled Bout with Cano ===
Gómez was scheduled to face Pablo César Cano in a ten-round bout at light middleweight on July 15, 2016, at the Fantasy Springs Resort Casino in Indio, California, U.S., but this was canceled three days before the scheduled fight after Gómez suffered an injury during camp.

=== Retirement and Potential Comeback ===
After his bout with Cano fell through, Gómez evidently retired and has not been in the ring since fighting Kamegai. However, on August 19, 2024, he announced his intention to make a comeback at 43 years old, eyeing Nick Diaz as a potential opponent.

== Professional boxing record ==
33 fights	25 wins	6 losses
By knockout	12	2
By decision	13	4
Draws	2	

No.	Result	Record	Opponent	Type	Round, time	Date	Location	Notes
33	Win	25–6–2	(Japan) Yoshihiro Kamegai	UD	10	Mar 20, 2015	(United States) Fantasy Springs Casino, Indio, California, U.S.	
32	Win	24–6–2	(United States) Ed Paredes	UD	10	Jul 9, 2014	(United States) Hard Rock Hotel & Casino, Paradise, Nevada, U.S.	
31	Loss	23–6–2	(United States) Shawn Porter	UD	10	Jul 28, 2012	(United States) HP Pavilion, San Jose, California, U.S.	For vacant WBO–NABO welterweight title
30	Loss	23–5–2	(Mexico) Canelo Álvarez	TKO	6 (12), 2:36	Sep 17, 2011	(United States) Staples Center, Los Angeles, California, U.S.	For WBC light middleweight title
29	Win	23–4–2	(United States) Calvin Green	KO	2 (10), 1:24	May 21, 2011	(United States) Morongo Casino Resort & Spa, Cabazon, California, U.S.	
28	Win	22–4–2	(Mexico) José Luis Castillo	RTD	6 (10), 0:10	Mar 13, 2010	(United States) Cowboys Stadium, Arlington, Texas, U.S.	Retained WBC Continental Americas welterweight title
27	Win	21–4–2	(Mexico) Jesús Soto Karass	TD	6 (10), 2:14	Nov 14, 2009	(United States) MGM Grand Garden Arena, Paradise, Nevada, U.S.	Won vacant WBC Continental Americas welterweight title; Unanimous TD after Gómez was cut from an accidental head clash
26	Win	20–4–2	(United States) Raúl Muñoz	KO	1 (10), 1:01	Aug 29, 2009	(United States) Blaisdell Center, Honolulu, Hawaii, U.S.	
25	Win	19–4–2	(Mexico) Juan Manuel Buendia	TKO	8 (10), 1:07	May 1, 2009	(United States) Hard Rock Hotel & Casino, Paradise, Nevada, U.S.	
24	Loss	18–4–2	(Puerto Rico) Miguel Cotto	RTD	5 (12), 3:00	Apr 12, 2008	(United States) Boardwalk Hall, Atlantic City, New Jersey, U.S.	For WBA welterweight title
23	Win	18–3–2	(Ghana) Ben Tackie	UD	10	Oct 16, 2007	(United States) Home Depot Center, Carson, California, U.S.	
22	Win	17–3–2	(Canada) Arturo Gatti	TKO	7 (10), 2:12	Jul 14, 2007	(United States) Boardwalk Hall, Atlantic City, New Jersey, U.S.	
21	Win	16–3–2	(United Kingdom) Martin Concepcion	TKO	7 (8), 2:23	Mar 30, 2007	(United Kingdom) Metro Radio Arena, Newcastle, England	
20	Win	15–3–2	(United States) Carson Jones	TKO	8 (8), 2:28	Aug 25, 2006	(United States) Arco Arena, Sacramento, California, U.S.	
19	Draw	14–3–2	(United States) Jesse Feliciano	MD	8	May 4, 2006	(United States) The Aladdin, Paradise, Nevada, U.S.	
18	Win	14–3–1	(Mexico) Luciano Perez	TKO	4 (5), 2:00	Oct 15, 2005	(United States) Staples Center, Los Angeles, California, U.S.	
17	Win	13–3–1	(United States) Jesse Brinkley	UD	5	May 24, 2005	(United States) Caesars Palace, Paradise, Nevada, U.S.	
16	Loss	12–3–1	(United States) Peter Manfredo Jr.	UD	7	Sep 23, 2004	(United States) Pasadena, California, U.S.	Part of NBC's reality TV show "The Contender"
15	Win	12–2–1	(Denmark) Ahmed Khaddour	UD	5	Sep 15, 2004	(United States) Pasadena, California, U.S.	Part of NBC's reality TV show "The Contender"
14	Win	11–2–1	(United States) Peter Manfredo Jr.	UD	5	Aug 18, 2004	(United States) Pasadena, California, U.S.	Part of NBC's reality TV show "The Contender"
13	Win	10–2–1	(Nicaragua) Julio Cesar Lanzas	UD	6	Feb 28, 2004	(United States) Radisson Graystone Castle Hotel, Thornton, Colorado, U.S.	
12	Win	9–2–1	(United States) Patrick Thompson	TKO	5 (6), 1:12	Nov 22, 2003	(United States) Reliant Park, Houston, Texas, U.S.	
11	Win	8–2–1	(Mexico) Jose Antonio Ojeda	MD	6	Sep 13, 2003	(United States) Pechanga Resort & Casino, Temecula, California, U.S.	
10	Win	7–2–1	(Mexico) Antonio Garcia	KO	2 (6), 1:56	Jul 19, 2003	(United States) Reliant Park, Houston, Texas, U.S.	
9	Win	6–2–1	(United States) Juan Carlos Amezcua	TKO	3 (6)	May 10, 2003	(United States) Pechanga Resort & Casino, Temecula, California, U.S.	
8	Loss	5–2–1	(United States) Jesse Feliciano	UD	6	Feb 28, 2003	(United States) Orleans Hotel & Casino, Paradise, Nevada, U.S.	
7	Win	5–1–1	(Mexico) Michael Santos	UD	6	Jan 24, 2003	(United States) Crowne Plaza Hotel, Commerce, California, U.S.	
6	Win	4–1–1	(United States) Dumont Welliver	UD	4	Nov 1, 2002	(United States) Orleans Hotel & Casino, Paradise, Nevada, U.S.	
5	Draw	3–1–1	(Mexico) Leobardo Roman	SD	2 (6), 0:44	Mar 29, 2002	(United States) Radisson Hotel, Sacramento, California, U.S.	
4	Win	3–1	(United States) Jesse Feliciano	SD	4	Dec 28, 2001	(United States) Orleans Hotel & Casino, Paradise, Nevada, U.S.	
3	Win	2–1	(United States) Antonio Garcia	KO	1 (4), 3:00	Oct 25, 2001	(United States) Marriott Hotel, Irvine, California, U.S.	
2	Loss	1–1	(United States) Ishe Smith	UD	4	Jun 15, 2001	(United States) Orleans Hotel & Casino, Paradise, Nevada, U.S.	
1	Win	1–0	(United States) Pedro Antonio Ochoa	SD	4	May 19, 2001	(United States) Fantasy Springs Casino, Indio, California, U.S.	Professional debut

Preceded by Orlando Lora	WBC Continental Americas Welterweight Champion; November 14, 2009 – November 13, 2010; Vacated	Vacant Title next held by Mike Jones
