= Tarick Salmaci =

American boxer

Personal information
- Nickname: The Arabian Prince
- Nationality: American
- Born: February 28, 1972 (age 54)
- Height: 6 ft 1 in (185 cm)

Boxing career
- Reach: 73 in (185 cm)

Boxing record
- Total fights: 23
- Wins: 20
- Win by KO: 11
- Losses: 3

Tarick Salmaci (born February 28, 1972) is a Lebanese-American former professional boxer and North American Boxing Organization (NABO) middleweight champion. He was one of 16 boxers chosen worldwide to participate on season 1 of NBC's reality television series The Contender.

== Boxing ==
=== Amateur career ===
Salmaci began his boxing career at the age of 8 at Kronk Gym in Detroit. He compiled an amateur record of 136–12, and earned a spot in the Olympic Trials where he fought his way to the finals, just missing the U.S. Olympic team.

=== Professional career ===
Salmaci turned professional after the Olympic Trials and signed with manager Jackie Kallen.

Salmaci won the North American Boxing Organization's super middleweight title on March 11, 1997, in Phoenix, Arizona. He then signed to fight Joe Calzaghe for the WBO super middleweight championship but pulled out of the fight after a dispute with his management.

Salmaci won his first eighteen professional bouts and finished his career in May 2005 with an overall record of nineteen wins and three losses.

== Acting ==
In the first season of NBC's reality show The Contender, Salmaci was one of 16 fighters chosen worldwide to participate on the show, Although Salmaci lost in the first round of the show's tournament, he was voted back as a "fan favorite" to fight once more.

== Personal life ==
Salmaci has a Bachelor of Arts degree from the University of Michigan. He also invests in real estate development. He is married and has one daughter.

== Professional boxing record ==
22 fights	19 wins	3 losses
By knockout	5	0
By decision	14	3
Draws	0	
No contests	0	

No.	Result	Record	Opponent	Type	Round, time	Date	Location	Notes
22	Loss	19–3	(United States) Jimmy Lange	MD	5	2005-05-24	Caesars Palace, Las Vegas, Nevada, USA	
21	Loss	19–2	(Mexico) Juan de la Rosa	UD	5	2004-09-05	Pasadena, California, USA	
20	Win	19–1	(United States) Thomas McGrogan	UD	6	2001-03-29	Cobo Hall, Detroit, Michigan, USA	
19	Loss	18–1	(United States) Kippy Warren	MD	8	1999-10-22	Joe Louis Arena, Detroit, Michigan, USA	For vacant USA Mid West Super middleweight title.
18	Win	18–0	(United States) Bruce Rumbolz	UD	10	1999-07-16	Twin Lakes Golf Club, Oakland, Michigan, USA	
17	Win	17–0	(Canada) Kit Munroe	UD	10	1998-07-31	Orleans Hotel & Casino, Las Vegas, Nevada, USA	
16	Win	16–0	(United States) Jerry Cheatham	DQ	10 (12), 1:54	1997-03-11	Club Rio, Phoenix, Arizona, USA	Won WBO NABO Super Middleweight title.
15	Win	15–0	(United States) Marcel Huffaker	KO	1 (6)	1996-05-23	Dearborn, Michigan, USA	
14	Win	14–0	(United States) Stacy Goodson	PTS	6	1995-08-03	Detroit, Michigan, USA	
13	Win	13–0	(United States) Deltonia Clary	PTS	6	1995-04-26	The Palace, Auburn Hills, Michigan, USA	
12	Win	12–0	(United States) Tyrone Mack	KO	5 (8)	1994-09-21	Inkster, Michigan, USA	
11	Win	11–0	(United States) Gerald Reed	PTS	8	1994-07-20	Adray Sports Arena, Dearborn, Michigan, USA	Won vacant USA Mid West Super welterweight title.
10	Win	10–0	(United States) David Walker	KO	1 (6)	1994-06-25	World's Fair Convention Center, Knoxville, Tennessee, USA	
9	Win	9–0	(United States) Tyrone Ingram	UD	6	1994-01-25	The Palace, Auburn Hills, Michigan, USA	
8	Win	8–0	(United States) Bryan Blakely	UD	6	1993-12-07	The Palace, Auburn Hills, Michigan, USA	
7	Win	7–0	(United States) Tim Dendy	UD	6	1993-08-24	The Palace, Auburn Hills, Michigan, USA	
6	Win	6–0	(United States) Mike Hammond	UD	4	1993-05-15	Trump Castle, Atlantic City, New Jersey, USA	
5	Win	5–0	(United States) Demetrius Davis	MD	4	1993-04-08	Resorts Casino Hotel, Atlantic City, New Jersey, USA	
4	Win	4–0	(United States) Aaron McLaurine	UD	4	1993-03-23	The Palace, Auburn Hills, Michigan, USA	
3	Win	3–0	(Jamaica) Errol Brown	PTS	4	1993-01-12	The Palace, Auburn Hills, Michigan, USA	
2	Win	2–0	(United States) David Lee	TKO	1 (4), 2:04	1992-11-24	The Palace, Auburn Hills, Michigan, USA	
1	Win	1–0	(United States) Vernard Wright	KO	1 (4), 1:04	1992-08-25	The Palace, Auburn Hills, Michigan, USA	Professional debut.
