= Ahmad Kaddour =

Lebanese boxer

Personal information
- Nickname: Babyface
- Nationality: (Denmark) Danish
- Born: Ahmad Sam Kaddour; January 1, 1982 (age 44) Tripoli, Lebanon
- Height: 6ft (183cm)
- Weight: Middleweight

Boxing career
- Reach: 72 in (183 cm)

Boxing record
- Total fights: 30
- Wins: 27
- Win by KO: 10
- Losses: 2
- Draws: 1

Ahmad "Babyface" Kaddour (born January 1, 1982, Lebanon) is a professional boxer.

== Personal life ==
Born in Tripoli, Lebanon, Kaddour's parents fled the 1982 Lebanon War and Ahmad grew up in Denmark where he got his start in boxing. He has moved back and forth between Europe and the United States since 2003.

== Professional boxing career ==
=== Beginning ===
After winning the Danish National Amateur Championship in 2000, and his 2nd Nordic Amateur Championship (1999 and 2000), and much international amateur experience (Dual in England, Finland, Dual in Sweden, Home dual v Sweden, Germany), Kaddour turned pro. Kaddour started his career in Europe, fighting in Denmark, Wales, Hungary, Finland, Italy and Germany including a fight against Alessio Furlan at Braunschweig, Germany. The fight went the full distance with Kaddour winning narrowly on points to inflict Furlan with the first defeat of his professional career. Soon after Kaddour moved to the United States to further his career.

=== USA and The Contender Series ===
In 2003–2004, Kaddour fought 4 out of 5 fights in the US, the other in Germany, against opponents with winning records and won 3 of the 4 USA fights by stoppage, and was very confident at 18-0 when selected to participate on the reality TV show The Contender, broadcast worldwide, and was placed on the East Coast team. While on the team, he got involved in a feud with Ishe Smith early on and they fought in the 3rd match. At the time Smith was world ranked by all 4 sanctioning organizations and held the USBA, the NABO, and the WBC Continental Americas titles. Kaddour gunned for an early KO but Smith weathered the storm and won by unanimous decision, calling it a "tough fight" afterwards. Kaddour was voted back into the quarterfinals after Juan de la Rosa pulled out – a tactic by Jesse Brinkley, Anthony Bonsante, Peter Manfredo, and Joey Gilbert designed to get under Smith's skin. The week after Smith lost a split decision to eventual Contender and WBC champion Sergio Mora, Ahmad was matched with Alfonso Gomez (who went on after the show to challenge for the WBA 147 lb and WBC 154 lb titles) by the same boxers who brought Kaddour back, with the hope that the two tough fighters would battle hard and the winner would be less ready for the semi-finals. Kaddour lost by 1 round on 1 card and 3 rounds on the other 2 cards.

The first of the Contender contestants to fight again after the show's finale, Kaddour dominated through an 8-round unanimous decision against Maxell Taylor on July 22, 2005, on Showtime's Shobox. Months later he fought Jesus Felipe Valverde to a draw due to a recurring stamina problem. Two of the judges scored the fight even and the third had Kaddour winning by two rounds. Two months after this, in November 2006, Ahmad had a rematch against Valverde, which he won by split decision on Versus. Valverde, who had gone the distance with future world titlists Carlos Quintana, Kermit Cintrón, and Yuri Foreman, as well as other top competition, was the busier fighter, but Kaddour was the more effective puncher.

Ahmad's fiancé on the Contender series was Brandy Collins, an American who sponsored him for a fiancé visa. They were married after the Contender and had a son in 2006. Brandy later told him to leave their home in Houston. According to BoxingScene.com and a Houston Tribune article, Ahmad entered the home (still registered in both their names) without her permission in June 2007 and was charged with burglary. He pleaded guilty to Class A Misdemeanor trespassing and was sentenced to 180 days in Harris County Jail in downtown Houston and Brandy withdrew her sponsorship of him with the INS, causing Kaddour to be transferred to immigration agents and deported to Denmark upon his release from federal custody in December 2007, and Collins obtained a divorce. Kaddour also reportedly had problems breathing through his nose and had surgery.

=== Comeback ===
After an almost 3-year hiatus from boxing working a steady job, Kaddour appeared on the undercard of Danish Super middleweight Mikkel Kessler's defense of the WBA title at the Messecenter Herning, Denmark, September 12, 2009, winning a unanimous decision over the tough German, Mike Ermis. He returned to the United States and beat Jerome Ellis by unanimous decision on March 26, 2010, then back to Denmark, where on February 11, 2011, he beat Lee Noble on Denmark's TV2 "Fight Night". Kaddour trained with Greg Coverson at the "Detroit Boxing Jungle" before scoring a 5th-round TKO over Vance Garvey at the Motor City Casino on October 6. His next 3 fights were for Sauerland Events on Viasat's Nordic Fight Night series, with 2012 decisions over Britain's Gary Boulden and Max Maxwell and a September 2013 unanimous decision over Estonia's Aleksei Tsatiasvili.

=== Future plans ===
In August 2012 World Boxing News spoke with both Ishe Smith and Alfonso Gomez about possible rematches with Kaddour, giving him the opportunity to avenge his only 2 losses. Smith ruled a rematch out in the immediate future as he was still trying to attain his first world title shot through Golden Boy Promotions (since won a majority decision over The Contender 2 bronze medalist Cornelius Bundrage for the IBF 154 lb title 2/23/13), but Gomez expressed interest and promised to "beat him worse this time". February 2013, Kaddour stated he holds no ill will toward Smith from their Contender days despite the taunting that led to their old rivalry, but he still very much wants a rematch with Smith. In August 2013, Smith said "Beating Ahmed was right up there" with his best fights before winning the IBF title.

== Professional boxing record ==
27 Wins (10 knockouts, 16 decisions), 2 Losses ( 2 by decision), 1 Draw
Res.	Opponent	Opp Rec	Type	Rd	Date	Location	Notes
Win	(Estonia) Aleksei Tsatiasvili	4-4	UD	6	2013-09-7	Arena Nord, Frederikshavn, Denmark	59-55, 60-54, 58-56 video on Viasat Nordic Fight Night
Win	(United Kingdom) Max Maxwell	16-11-3	UD	8	2012-09-22	Arean Nord, Frederikshavn, Denmark	77-75, 77-75, 77-75 on Viasat Nordic Fight Night
Win	(United Kingdom) Gary Boulden	6–3–2	MD	8	2012-06-02	Herning Kongrescenter, Herning, Denmark	79-73, 78-74, 76-76 on Viasat Nordic Fight Night
Win	(United States) Vance Garvey	8-34-6	TKO	5 (8)	2011-10-06	(United States) Motor City Casino, Detroit	video garvey down in 2nd, right eye closed
Win	(United Kingdom) Lee Noble	12–16–2	UD	6	2011-02-12	Herning Kongrescenter, Herning, Denmark	60-51, 60-54, 60-54 video on TV 2 (Denmark)
Win	(The Bahamas) Jerome Ellis	12-10-2	UD	8	2010-03-27	(United States) Hamilton Manor, Hamilton Township, New Jersey	79-73, 79-73, 80-72 video
Win	(Germany) Cagri Ermis	6-7-2	UD	6	2009-09-12	Messecenter Herning, Herning, Denmark	60-54, 59-55, 58-57 video after 2 year 10 month layoff
Win	(Mexico) Jesus Felipe Valverde	21-12-1	SD	8	2006-11-02	(United States) Chevrolet Centre, Youngstown, Ohio	77-75, 77-75, 75-77 on Versus
Draw	(Mexico) Jesus Felipe Valverde	21-12	Draw	8	2006-09-14	(United States) Orleans Hotel & Casino, Las Vegas	78-74, 76-76, 76-76
Win	(United States) Maxell Taylor	12–1	UD	8	2005-07-22	(United States) Chumash Casino, Santa Ynez, California	79-73, 78-74, 80-72 on Shobox
Loss	(Mexico) Alfonso Gomez	11–2–1	UD	5	2004-09-15	(United States) Pasadena, California	video on NBC's The Contender
Loss	(United States) Ishe Smith	14-0	UD	5	2004-08-24	(United States) Pasadena, California	video on NBC's The Contender
Win	(United States) Fontaine Cabell	22–4–1	TKO	1 (10)	2004-07-17	(United States) Baysox Stadium, Bowie, Maryland	
Win	(Mexico) Juan Carlos Garcia	7–2	KO	4 (8)	2004-04-24	(United States) Staples Center, Los Angeles	garcia down in 1 & 4, stopped before start of 5th
Win	(Hungary) Lorant Szabo	20–14	UD	6	2003-12-20	Ostseehalle, Kiel, Schleswig-Holstein, Germany	video
Win	(United States) Leo Edwards	14–12–2	KO	1 (8)	2003-10-23	(United States) Princess Chateau, Lodi, New Jersey	video on CSI Sports
Win	(Dominican Republic) Wilmer Mejia	13–3–2	MD	8	2003-09-25	(United States) Michael's Eighth Avenue, Glen Burnie, Maryland	77-74, 77-75, 76-76 video on Fight Network
Win	(France) Alban Mothie	9–7–1	MD	6	2002-11-16	Baltic Hall, Mariehamn, Finland	59-56, 58-58, 60-55
Win	(France) Louis Mimoune	14–16	TKO	3 (6)	2002-06-15	Gubbio, Umbria, Italy	
Win	(France) Cyril Terrones	21–14–1	UD	6	2002-04-06	Circus Building, Copenhagen, Denmark	58-55, 59-55, 59-54
Win	(Italy) Francesco Cioffi	9–23–8	KO	2 (6)	2002-02-23	Skive Hallerne, Skive, Denmark	
Win	(Italy) Alessio Furlan	3–0–2	UD	6	2002-02-08	Volkswagen Halle, Braunschweig, Niedersachsen, Germany	video
Win	(France) Rachid Ouafi	3–0	KO	2 (6)	2001-11-24	Vejen Idraetscenter, Vejen, Denmark	
Win	(France) Michel Ventura	5–6–1	KO	6	2001-11-03	Hansehalle, Lübeck, Schleswig-Holstein, Germany	
Win	(Morocco) Hamit Riahi	8–21–1	TKO	1	2001-10-07	Universum Gym, Wandsbek, Hamburg, Germany	
Win	(Romania) Florin Oanea	4–11–3	UD	6	2001-06-08	Imperial Gym, Budapest, Hungary	
Win	(United Kingdom) David White	0–4–1	UD	4	2001-04-28	International Arena, Cardiff, Wales, United Kingdom	ref scores 39-36
Win	(Spain) Antonio Postigo	2–7–1	UD	4	2001-02-04	Alsterdorfer Sporthalle, Hamburg, Germany	
Win	(Germany) Abdelilah Benabbou	0–0–1	KO	1	2001-02-10	Estrel Convention Center, Neukölln, Berlin, Germany	
Win	(Hungary) Attila Kiss	0–2	UD	4	2000-010-07	Estrel Convention Center, Neukölln, Berlin, Germany	Ahmad's professional debut.
