= Les Ralston =

American boxer (born 1980)

Leslie John Ralston (born November 13, 1980, in Buffalo, New York) is an American boxer.

== Professional career ==
Known as "Lightning" Les, Ralston began his professional career in 2002, and lost to Sergio Mora in 2004 before Mora's appearance on The Contender.

== Personal life ==
On May 4, 2012, police report that Leslie Ralston struck Zachary Zorechak, 18, and Brittany Cain, 17, as they crossed the street in front of police headquarters in the City of Tonawanda, New York. Ralston did not stop, even though one of the victims clung to the hood of his car for nearly 200 feet. Ralston was charged with second-degree assault, a felony, as well as three counts of leaving the scene of an injury accident and third-degree aggravated unlicensed operation of a vehicle, for driving with a suspended license.

On December 28, 2012, WIVB news reports that Ralston was also sentenced to one year in jail after pleading guilty to Grand Larceny, 3rd Degree. He was guilty of defrauding an 85-year-old woman out of $18,450 for charging her for unneeded roof repairs.

WIVB also reports that Ralston’s older brother, Joseph Ralston, is currently serving time over another fraudulent home improvement scheme. Ralston’s father was convicted of home improvement schemes dating back to the 1980s.

== The Contender ==
He will be one of the featured boxers on the 3rd season of the boxing reality TV series, The Contender, The Contender (season 3), premiering September 4, 2007, on ESPN.
