= Canelo Álvarez vs. Alfonso Gómez =

Boxing match

Star Power Los Angeles
- Date: September 17, 2011
- Venue: Staples Center, Los Angeles, California, U.S.
- Title(s) on the line: WBC super welterweight title

Tale of the tape
Boxer	(Mexico) Saúl Álvarez	(Mexico) Alfonso Gómez
Nickname	"Canelo"	
Hometown	Tlajomulco de Zuñiga, Jalisco, Mexico	Guadalajara, Jalisco, Mexico
Pre-fight record	37–0–1 (27 KO)	23–4–2 (12 KO)
Age	21 years, 1 month	30 years, 10 months
Height	5 ft 8 in (173 cm)	5 ft 9 in (175 cm)
Weight	153.6 lb (70 kg)	152.6 lb (69 kg)
Style	Orthodox	Orthodox
Recognition	WBC; Super Welterweight Champion; The Ring; No. 3 Ranked Light Middleweight	WBC; No. 7 Ranked Super Welterweight

Result
- Álvarez wins via 6th-round TKO

Canelo Álvarez vs. Alfonso Gómez was a professional boxing match contested on 17 September 2011, for the WBC super welterweight championship. The fight took place at Staples Center, Los Angeles, California, United States on 17 September 2011 as part of the Victor Ortiz vs. Floyd Mayweather Jr. pay-per-view broadcast. The Mayweather-Ortiz fight took place at the MGM Grand Garden Arena in Las Vegas, Nevada taking place on the Mexican Independence weekend. Fans at Staples Center were able to see the live feed from Las Vegas and also see Canelo Alvarez fight live that night, and the people in Las Vegas could see the live feed from the Canelo fight in the Staples Center.

== Background ==
After a successful defense against Britain's Ryan Rhodes in his hometown of Guadalajara, Jalisco, Alvarez had various options to who defend his world title against next. Former Contender Alfonso Gomez had recently stopped Calvin Green in two rounds, and sent out a challenge to the young champion soon after his victory at the Morongo Casino, Resort & Spa in California. His plan was to contend at Welterweight unless he could get a shot at Canelo.

== The fight ==
Alvarez kept his 154-pound title belt, stopping Gomez at 2:36 of the sixth round. Alvarez knocked down Gomez with a compact left hook late in the first round as more of a balance knockdown while the round was slow up to that point. Gomez rallied in the next few rounds and hung in with the hard-punching Alvarez, outworking and outlanding him by a large margin and giving him problems with his in-and-out movement, his jab, and combination punching. Gomez looked to be winning from the 2nd round to the first half of the 5th round. Alvarez seemingly was coming on in the second half of the fifth round, and he stopped Gomez near the end of the 6th, with a nasty uppercut stunning Gomez and a follow-up flurry forcing the stoppage. Gomez thought referee Wayne Hedgpeth stopped the fight too soon, with Alvarez raining blows on Gomez for about six seconds, but not many getting through his defense. The general consensus (and HBO's take) was that the stoppage was very quick as well.

== Aftermath ==
Following the showing of each of the main events on the night, fans in attendance saw two post-fight concerts performed by Los Tucanes de Tijuana and El Gran Silencio.

== Undercard ==
Confirmed bouts:

=== Preliminary card ===
- Light Welterweight bout: (Mexico) Antonio Orozco vs. (United States) Fernando Rodriguez
  - Orozco defeated Rodrigruez by unanimous decision. (60-54 | 60-54 | 60-54)
- Welterweight bout: (United States) Hugo Centeno Jr. vs. (United States) Willie Walton
  - Centeno Jr. defeated Walton by unanimous decision. (40-35 | 39-36 | 39-36 )
- Super Welterweight bout: (United States) Ray Rivera vs. (United States) Rudy Gonzalez
  - Rivera defeated Gonzalez by knockout at 1:26 of the first round.
- Featherweight bout: (Mexico) Mikayl Arreola vs. (United States) Juan Sandoval
  - Arreola defeated Sandoval by unanimous decision. (58-55 | 58-55 | 57-56)

== International broadcasting ==
Country	Broadcaster
Argentina	TyC Sports
Australia	Main Event
Belgium	Be Sport 1
Czech Republic	Sport 1
Denmark	TV 2 Sport
Europe	Eurosport
France	Canal+ Sport
Hungary	Sport 1
Iceland	Stöð 2 Sport
Japan	WOWOW
Malaysia	Astro SuperSport
New Zealand	Sky
Philippines	Solar Sports
Poland	Polsat Sport
Portugal	Sport TV
Russia	NTV Plus
Spain	Digital+
Sweden	TV10
South Africa	SuperSport
United Kingdom	Primetime
United States	HBO PPV

Preceded by vs. Ryan Rhodes	Canelo Álvarez's bouts 17 September 2011	Succeeded by vs. Kermit Cintrón
Preceded by vs. Calvin Green	Alfonso Gómez's bouts 17 September 2011	Succeeded by vs. Shawn Porter
