= Jimmy's Corner =

Dive bar in Times Square, Manhattan

- Interactive map of the Jimmy's Corner area

General information
- Location: Midtown Manhattan, New York City, 140 West 44th Street
- Coordinates: 40.7567°N 73.9848°W
- Opening: 1971
- Owner: Adam Glenn

Jimmy's Corner is a dive bar at 140 West 44th Street in the Times Square area of Midtown Manhattan, New York City. It was opened in 1971 by Jimmy Glenn, a boxing trainer and former amateur boxer, and has been operated since 2015 by his son Adam Glenn. The bar is known for its boxing memorabilia, low drink prices, and its status as one of the last remaining dive bars in Times Square.

As of 2025, the bar is the subject of a legal dispute with its landlord, the Durst Organization, over an eviction notice.

== History ==
Jimmy Glenn opened the bar in 1971 on West 44th Street, between Sixth and Seventh Avenues. Glenn was a former Golden Gloves amateur boxer who had become a boxing trainer and cutman, working with fighters including Floyd Patterson, Bobby Cassidy, Howard Davis Jr., and Terrence Alli. He also operated the Times Square Boxing Club on West 42nd Street from the late 1970s until 1993. Glenn was inducted into the New Jersey Boxing Hall of Fame in 2002 and the inaugural class of the New York State Boxing Hall of Fame in 2012.

At the time the bar opened, Times Square was known for prostitution, peep shows, and drug dealing. Glenn ran the bar with his wife Swietlana "Swannie" Garbarska until her death in 2015. Their son Adam, a Harvard Law School graduate and former corporate attorney, left his legal career to help run the bar after his mother's death.

Glenn died on May 7, 2020, aged 89, from complications of COVID-19 at NYU Langone Medical Center. The bar closed during the COVID-19 pandemic and reopened on October 4, 2021, under Adam Glenn's management. In 2022, New York City mayor Eric Adams designated August 18 as "Jimmy Glenn Day" to recognize both Glenn and the impact of Jimmy's Corner.

=== Eviction dispute ===
The building is owned by the Durst Organization. The Glenn and Durst families had a longstanding relationship dating back decades, during which time the rent remained well below market rate. As of 2025, the bar pays approximately $5,000 per month for the roughly 1,000-square-foot (93 m^{2}) space, against an estimated market rate of $15,000.

In December 2025, the Durst Organization moved to evict the bar, arguing that a provision in a lease amendment allowed termination upon the death of the original tenant, Jimmy Glenn. Adam Glenn filed a lawsuit in New York Supreme Court on December 4, 2025, alleging that his father, who had no formal education beyond seventh grade and was not represented by an attorney, did not understand the legal effect of the provision when he signed the amendment. The complaint also alleges discriminatory treatment toward Black patrons of the bar.

The Durst Organization has said it informed Glenn over a year in advance that he would need to vacate and offered $250,000 to relocate. Glenn disputes the timeline and terms described by the landlord. The bar's lease runs through 2029.

As of February 2026, a judge has temporarily halted eviction proceedings while the lawsuit is pending.

== Description ==
Jimmy's Corner occupies a narrow, 15-foot-wide (4.6 m) storefront. The interior is lined with framed boxing photographs, fight posters, and memorabilia collected by Jimmy Glenn over his career. The bar features a jukebox. It does not serve food.

As of 2025, a draft beer costs $3. According to Adam Glenn, a scene from the 1980 film Raging Bull was filmed at the bar.
