= Pepe Correa =

American boxer

Jose "Pepe" Correa is a boxing trainer who has trained Sugar Ray Leonard, Roberto Durán, Lennox Lewis, Simon Brown and Maurice Blocker. He was one of the trainers on the 3rd season of the boxing reality TV series, The Contender, premiering September 4, 2007 on ESPN.
