= Floyd Mayweather Jr. vs. Canelo Álvarez =

2013 professional boxing match

The One
- Date: September 14, 2013
- Venue: MGM Grand Garden Arena, Paradise, Nevada, U.S.
- Title(s) on the line: WBA (Super), WBC, The Ring, and TBRB light middleweight titles

Tale of the tape
Boxer	Floyd Mayweather Jr.	Saúl Álvarez
Nickname	Money	Canelo ("Cinnamon")
Hometown	Las Vegas, Nevada, U.S.	Guadalajara, Jalisco, Mexico
Purse	$41,500,000	$12,000,000
Pre-fight record	44–0 (26 KO)	42–0–1 (30 KO)
Age	36 years, 6 months	23 years, 1 month
Height	5 ft 8 in (173 cm)	5 ft 8 in (173 cm)
Weight	150 1/2 lb (68 kg)	152 lb (69 kg)
Style	Orthodox	Orthodox
Recognition	WBA (Super); Light Middleweight Champion; WBC and The Ring; Welterweight Champion; TBRB; No. 1 Ranked Light Middleweight; The Ring No. 1 ranked pound-for-pound fighter 5-division world champion	WBA (Unified), WBC, and The Ring; Light Middleweight Champion; TBRB; No. 2 Ranked Light Middleweight; The Ring No. 9 ranked pound-for-pound fighter

Result
- Mayweather Jr. wins via 12-round majority decision (114–114, 116–112, 117–111)

Floyd Mayweather Jr. vs. Canelo Álvarez, billed as The One, was a professional boxing match contested on September 14, 2013, for the WBA (Super), WBC, and The Ring light middleweight championships. The bout was held in the MGM Grand Garden Arena, at the MGM Grand Hotel & Casino in Las Vegas, Nevada, United States, on Showtime PPV.

== Background ==
In May 2013 Floyd Mayweather Jr. confirmed via Twitter that a deal had been reached to face WBC Super welterweight champion Saúl "Canelo" Álvarez in a unification bout on September 14. It would be the first defence of his Light middleweight title since he won it from Miguel Cotto in May 2012, 16 months earlier.

The bout took place at a 152-pound catchweight, two pounds below the light middleweight limit of 154 pounds and included a 13-pound rehydration clause. Álvarez entered the ring at 165 pounds, while Mayweather fought at 150 pounds, having forgone weight cutting. Mayweather received $41.5 million for this fight before taking into account pay-per-view sales.

== The fight ==
The fight was won by Mayweather in a 12-round majority decision in front of a sold-out crowd of 16,746. Judge C. J. Ross scored the fight 114–114, a draw. Judge Dave Moretti had it 116–112, and Craig Metcalfe scored it 117–111.

CompuBox stats showed Mayweather's dominance in the fight. He landed 232 of 505 punches (46%) while Álvarez connected on 117 of 526 thrown (22%).

Ross retired after this fight, after the scorecards were roundly criticized for not reflecting how dominant Mayweather's performance was. Out of 86 media scorecards, all 86 scored the fight for Mayweather, with an average score of 119–109.

== Aftermath ==
Speaking of the controversial scorecard, Mayweather said, "I can't control what the judges do."

== Fight card ==
Confirmed bouts:

Weight Class		vs.		Method	Round	Time	Notes
Light middleweight	(United States) Floyd Mayweather Jr. (c)	def.	(Mexico) Canelo Álvarez (c)	MD	12/12		(Note: For WBA (Super), WBC & The Ring light middleweight titles.)
Light welterweight	(United States) Danny García (c)	def.	(Argentina) Lucas Matthysse (ic)	UD	12/12		(Note: For WBA (Super), WBC & The Ring light welterweight titles.)
Light middleweight	(Mexico) Carlos Amado Molina	def.	(United States) Ishe Smith (c)	SD	12/12		(Note: For IBF junior middleweight title.)
Welterweight	(Mexico) Pablo César Cano	def.	(United Kingdom) Ashley Theophane	SD	10/10
Super middleweight	(Romania) Ronald Gavril	def.	(United States) Shujaa El Amin	UD	8/8
Middleweight	(United States) Chris Pearson	def.	(United States) Josh Williams	TKO	1/8	1:14
Super middleweight	(United States) Luís Arias	def.	(United States) James Winchester	UD	6/6
Super middleweight	(United States) Lanell Bellows	def.	(United States) Jordan Moore	KO	1/4	2:30

== International broadcasting ==
Country	Broadcaster
Argentina	Space
Argentina	TV Pública Digital
Australia	Main Event
Brazil	SporTV
Belgium	BeTV
Cambodia	CTN
Canada	Viewers Choice
Chile	Space
China	CCTV-5
Colombia	Space
Denmark	TV3 Sport
Estonia	Viasat Sport Baltic
Ecuador	Space
France	beIN Sport
Germany	DMAX
Hungary	Sport 1
Iceland	Stöð 2 Sport
Israel	Sport 1
Italy	Sportitalia
Japan	WOWOW
Latvia	Viasat Sport Baltic
Lithuania	Viasat Sport Baltic
Malaysia	Astro
Mexico	Televisa
New Zealand	Sky Arena
Norway	Viasat Sport
Panama	RPC-TV
Peru	Space
Philippines	GMA Network; GMA News TV^{1}
Poland	Orange Sport
Portugal	SPORT.TV2
Qatar	Al Jazeera Sports
Romania	GSP TV
Russia	Rossiya 2
Singapore	SuperSports
Spain	Canal+
South Africa	SuperSport
Thailand	True Sport
Ukraine	XSPORT
United Kingdom	BoxNation
United States	Showtime PPV
United States	US Military AFN Sports
Venezuela	Meridiano
Venezuela	Space

^{1}The GMA News TV telecast ceased commercial operations due to high airtime cost with live coverage via satellite feed of Floyd Mayweather Jr. vs. Canelo Álvarez, part of GMA News TV ceased broadcasting operations due to the network's "disappointing" development. The GMA Network management announced that GMA News TV would sign-off on December 31, 2013, but the sign-off never materialized.

Preceded by vs. Robert Guerrero	Floyd Mayweather Jr.'s bouts 14 September 2013	Succeeded by vs. Marcos Maidana
Preceded by vs. Austin Trout	Canelo Álvarez's bouts 14 September 2013	Succeeded by vs. Alfredo Angulo
Awards
Previous: September 15: HBO and Showtime both hold boxing events in Las Vegas: Chávez Jr. vs. Martínez and Álvarez vs. López	The Ring Magazine Event of the Year; 2013	Next: Carl Froch vs. George Groves II
