= Najai Turpin =

American boxer (1981–2005)

Personal information
- Nickname: Nitro
- Nationality: American
- Born: Najai Turpin Philadelphia, Pennsylvania, USA
- Weight: Welterweight

Boxing career
- Stance: Orthodox

Boxing record
- Total fights: 14
- Wins: 13
- Win by KO: 9
- Losses: 1
- Draws: 0
- No contests: 0

Najai "Nitro" Turpin (December 19, 1981 – February 14, 2005) was a professional boxer born in Philadelphia, Pennsylvania, USA.

He was a contestant on reality TV show The Contender. On the show, he was placed on the East Coast team and pitted himself against Sergio Mora, a man seven inches taller than he was, in the first round.

He committed suicide on February 14, 2005, while sitting in a car with his girlfriend and 2-year-old daughter. The motive for his suicide was not entirely clear. However, the fact that he had not been allowed to fight between the time of his elimination from The Contender and the show's finale (so as not to spoil the ending), along with the low self-esteem that may have resulted from his defeat on the show may have contributed to his suicide. Another contributing factor is considered to be the ongoing custody battle for his daughter.

Najai Turpin's initials were imprinted on Ishe Oluwa Ali Smith's shorts during a match, and the episode in which Najai fought was dedicated to him.
