= Carlos Molina (Mexican boxer) =

Mexican boxer

Personal information
- Nickname: King
- Born: Carlos Amado Molina Olvera; May 25, 1983 (age 43) Pátzcuaro, Michoacán, Mexico
- Height: 5 ft 9 in (175 cm)
- Weight: Welterweight; Light middleweight; Middleweight

Boxing career
- Reach: 70 in (178 cm)
- Stance: Orthodox

Boxing record
- Total fights: 55
- Wins: 39
- Win by KO: 13
- Losses: 14
- Draws: 2

Carlos Amado Molina (born May 25, 1983) is a Mexican professional boxer. He is a former IBF light middleweight champion.

== Amateur career ==
Molina started his amateur career at age eighteen, amassing a 6–1 record before turning professional after only two years.

== Professional career ==
In December, 2005, Molina fought the undefeated Julio César Chávez, Jr. to a controversial draw, a fight which many observers felt Molina won. In February 2006, he lost to Chavez in a rematch by a six-round majority decision. This bout was held at The Aladdin in Las Vegas, Nevada.

Molina then lost another majority decision, this time to Mike Alvarado, before scoring 9 consecutive wins, including a unanimous decision victory over Danny Perez for the WBO NABO light middleweight title. However, he would remain inactive for the following year and a half after a dispute with his promoter Don King.

On March 25, 2011, Molina fought undefeated Olympic gold medalist Erislandy Lara to a disputed majority draw. The final scores were 97-93 for Molina and 95–95 on the two other scorecards.

In his next fight, Molina scored a TKO victory over Allen Conyers.

On the undercard of the Floyd Mayweather-Canelo Alvarez superfight, on September 14, 2013, Molina defeated Ishe Smith by split decision to win the IBF Junior Middleweight title.

== Professional boxing record ==
55 fights	39 wins	14 losses
By knockout	13	1
By decision	26	12
By disqualification	0	1
Draws	2	

No.	Result	Record	Opponent	Type	Round, time	Date	Location	Notes
55	Win	39–14–2	Cristian Arrazola	TKO	3 (10)	2024-03-09	Quiroga, Mexico	
54	Loss	38–14–2	Ermal Hadribeaj	TKO	9 (10)	2023-11-17	Humo Arena, Tashkent, Uzbekistan	For WBC International light-middleweight title
53	Loss	38–13–2	Oziel Santoyo	SD	10 (10)	2022-11-19	Mexico City, Mexico	
52	Win	38–12–2	Juan Carlos Raygosa	UD	10 (10)	2021-09-24	Hotel La Posada de Don Vasco, Pátzcuaro, Mexico	
51	Loss	37–12–2	Sam Eggington	UD	12 (12)	2021-05-22	Skydome, Coventry, England, U.K.	For vacant WBC Silver middleweight title
50	Win	37–11–2	Edgar Ortega	UD	10 (10)	2021-02-06	Tzurumútaro, Mexico	
49	Win	36–11–2	Josue Castaneda Perez	UD	10 (10)	2020-12-18	Cintermex, Monterrey, Mexico	
48	Win	35–11–2	Juan Carlos Raygosa	UD	10 (10)	2020-11-06	Hotel La Parroquia, Pátzcuaro, Mexico	
47	Win	34–11–2	Hector Manuel Zepeda	RTD	6 (10)	2020-09-12	Hotel La Parroquia, Pátzcuaro, Mexico	
46	Win	33–11–2	Abraham Juarez	UD	10 (10)	2020-07-25	Pátzcuaro, Mexico	
45	Win	32–11–2	Michi Munoz	RTD	5 (10)	2020-06-06	Tarímbaro, Mexico	
44	Win	31–11–2	Nestor Fernando Garcia	TKO	10 (10)	2020-02-14	Santa Clara del Cobre, Mexico	
43	Win	30–11–2	Jesus Pina Najera	KO	7 (10)	2019-06-15	Pátzcuaro, Mexico	
42	Loss	29–11–2	Abass Baraou	UD	12 (12)	2019-02-16	Conlog Arena, Koblenz, Germany	For WBC International light-middleweight title
41	Win	29–10–2	Juan Jesus Rivera	UD	10 (10)	2018-09-14	Arena Patzcuaro, Pátzcuaro, Mexico	
40	Loss	28–10–2	Souleymane Cissokho	UD	10 (10)	2018-06-23	Palais des Sports, Paris, France	
39	Loss	28–9–2	Josh Kelly	UD	10 (10)	2018-03-31	Millennium Stadium, Cardiff, Wales, U.K.	
38	Loss	28–8–2	Ahmed El Mousaoui	UD	10 (10)	2017-10-14	Zénith, Paris, France	
37	Loss	28–7–2	Carlos Adames	UD	11 (11)	2017-07-26	Hotel Jaragua, Santo Domingo, Dominican Republic	For WBA Fedelatin welterweight title
36	Win	28–6–2	Diego Cruz	UD	8 (8)	2016-12-17	Oasis Hotel Complex, Cancún, Mexico	
35	Win	27–6–2	Carlos Gorham	UD	8 (8)	2016-08-20	Centro de Convenciones, Acapulco, Mexico	
34	Win	26–6–2	Javier Prieto	SD	8 (8)	2016-06-18	Deportivo Agustín Millán, Toluca, Mexico	
33	Win	25–6–2	Reyes Sanchez	UD	8 (8)	2016-04-02	Centro de Convenciones, Tlalnepantla de Baz, Mexico	
32	Win	24–6–2	Jose Agustin Feria	TKO	8 (10)	2016-01-23	Domo Care, Guadalupe, Mexico	
31	Win	23–6–2	Manuel Garcia	TKO	3 (10)	2015-09-19	Sports Center, Ecatepec de Morelos, Mexico	
30	Loss	22–6–2	Cornelius Bundrage	UD	12 (12)	2014-10-11	Oasis Hotel Complex, Cancún, Mexico	Lost IBF light middleweight title
29	Win	22–5–2	Ishe Smith	SD	12 (12)	2013-09-14	MGM Grand Garden Arena, Paradise, Nevada, U.S.	Won IBF light middleweight title
28	Win	21–5–2	Cory Spinks	UD	12 (12)	2013-02-01	UIC Pavilion, Chicago, Illinois, U.S.	
27	Win	20–5–2	Damian Frias	UD	10 (10)	2012-08-17	Buffalo Run Casino, Miami, Oklahoma, U.S.	
26	Loss	19–5–2	James Kirkland	DQ	10 (12)	2012-03-24	Reliant Arena, Houston, Texas, U.S.	For WBC Continental Americas light-middleweight title
25	Win	19–4–2	Kermit Cintrón	UD	10 (10)	9 Jul 2011	Dignity Health Sports Park, Carson, California, U.S.	
24	Win	18–4–2	Allen Conyers	TKO	7 (10)	2011-04-29	Cosmopolitan Resort, Paradise, Nevada, U.S.	
23	Draw	17–4–2	Erislandy Lara	MD	10 (10)	2011-03-25	Cosmopolitan Resort, Paradise, Nevada, U.S.	
22	Win	17–4–1	Danny Perez Ramírez	UD	12 (12)	2009-06-05	Mahi Temple Shrine Auditorium, Miami, Florida, U.S.	Won NABO light-middleweight title
21	Win	16–4–1	Ed Paredes	UD	10 (10)	2009-04-11	Emerald Queen Casino, Tacoma, Washington, U.S.	
20	Win	15–4–1	Salvador Camacho Velazquez	UD	10 (10)	2009-02-13	Roseland Ballroom, New York City, New York, U.S.	
19	Win	14–4–1	Jailer Berrio	UD	10 (10)	2009-01-10	Emerald Queen Casino, Tacoma, Washington, U.S.	
18	Win	13–4–1	Roberto Valenzuela	TKO	5 (6)	2008-12-12	Cicero Stadium, Cicero, Illinois, U.S.	
17	Win	12–4–1	Donald Camarena	UD	8 (8)	2008-08-08	Aragon Ballroom, Chicago, Illinois, U.S.	
16	Win	11–4–1	Cedrick Armstrong	UD	10 (10)	2008-06-28	Emerald Queen Casino, Tacoma, Washington, U.S.	
15	Win	10–4–1	Luciano Perez	UD	8 (8)	2008-04-11	Odeum Expo Center, Villa Park, Illinois, U.S.	
14	Win	9–4–1	Henry Mitchell	UD	6 (6)	2008-02-08	Sundance Saloon, Waukegan, Illinois, U.S.	
13	Loss	8–4–1	Mike Alvarado	MD	8 (8)	2007-02-16	Cicero Stadium, Cicero, Illinois, U.S.	
12	Loss	8–3–1	Wayland Willingham	UD	8 (8)	2006-12-01	Vernon Downs, Vernon, New York, U.S.	
11	Loss	8–2–1	Julio César Chávez Jr.	MD	6 (6)	2006-02-18	The Aladdin, Paradise, Nevada, U.S.	
10	Draw	8–1–1	Julio César Chávez Jr.	PTS	6 (6)	2005-12-16	Arena, Monterrey, Mexico	
9	Win	8–1	Loyal Goodman	TKO	3 (8)	2005-11-10	Riverside Ballroom, Green Bay, Wisconsin, U.S.	
8	Win	7–1	Joseph Pujoe	UD	6 (6)	2005-05-31	Ho Chunk Sports Center, Lynwood, Illinois, U.S.	
7	Win	6–1	Antoine Elerson	TKO	1 (4)	2005-03-24	Riverside Ballroom, Green Bay, Wisconsin, U.S.	
6	Win	5–1	Joe Lynch	UD	6 (6)	2005-01-14	Aragon Ballroom, Chicago, Illinois, U.S.	
5	Win	4–1	Adam Capo	TKO	3 (6)	2004-11-12	Resch Center, Green Bay, Wisconsin, U.S.	
4	Loss	3–1	Jonathan Ochoa	SD	4 (4)	2004-09-10	Hawthorne Race Course, Stickney, Illinois, U.S.	
3	Win	3–0	Nick Farrow	UD	6 (6)	2004-04-01	Riverside Ballroom, Green Bay, Wisconsin, U.S.	
2	Win	2–0	Vance Garvey	UD	4 (4)	2004-02-27	DePaul Athletic Center, Chicago, Illinois, U.S.	
1	Win	1–0	James Rice	TKO	4 (4)	2003-10-23	Wisconsin, U.S.	

== See also ==
- List of Mexican boxing world champions
- List of world light-middleweight boxing champions

Sporting positions
Regional boxing titles
Preceded by Danny Perez Ramírez	NABO light-middleweight champion June 5, 2009 – 2009; Vacated	Vacant Title next held by Vanes Martirosyan
World boxing titles
Preceded by Ishe Smith	IBF light-middleweight champion September 14, 2013 – October 11, 2014	Succeeded by Cornelius Bundrage
