= Ring 8 and New York State Boxing Hall of Fame =

Ring 8 officials on the dais at the annual Ring 8 dinner in Howard Beach, New York, 2010.

Ring 8 refers to a nonprofit organization called Ring 8 located in New York City and founded in 1953 by ex prize-fighter Jack Grebelsky to help former professional boxers in need of financial assistance, including housing, medical care, and funeral related expenses. Ring 8 is composed of current and ex professional, amateur, and collegiate boxers, referees, trainers, promoters and others involved in the fight game. Ring 8's current president is boxing promoter Bob Duffy, a former New York State Boxing Commissioner. The group holds monthly meetings in Long Island City at The Waterfront Crabhouse, and an annual Holiday Party in December as well as a picnic each year. Ring 8 members past and present include Rocky Graziano, Joe Miceli, Vito Antuofermo, Juan Laporte, Tony Mazzarella, Bobby Cassidy, Matt Saha, Gil Clancy, Emile Griffith, Tony Napoli, Mark Breland, Jimmy Glenn, Junior Jones, Renaldo Snipes, Vinny Madalone, Danny Giovanelli, Bill Tate, Bobby Bartels, Henny Wallitsch, Tommy Gallagher, and Sandy Saddler.

In 2012, Ring 8 board members Tony Mazzarella and Bob Duffy, with a big help from the President of the New Jersey Boxing Hall of Fame, Henry Hascup, founded and endowed the New York State Boxing Hall of Fame, with its inaugural induction ceremony on April 1, 2012. In 2023, New York boxer Kathy “Wildcat” Collins became the first female boxer inducted into the New York State Boxing Hall of Fame.
