= Jimmy Lange =

American boxer

Personal information
- Nationality: American
- Born: August 25, 1975 (age 51) Great Falls, Virginia
- Height: 6 ft 0 in (183 cm)
- Weight: Light Middleweight

Boxing career
- Stance: Orthodox

Boxing record
- Total fights: 47
- Wins: 39
- Win by KO: 26
- Losses: 6
- Draws: 2
- No contests: 0

Jimmy Lange (born August 25, 1975) is an American former professional boxer.

== Early life ==
He began boxing at the age of five in Arlington, Virginia when his father who became his manager first brought him to Olympia Boxing Gym in Falls Church. Boxing immediately ignited interest in Jimmy when he realized the level of discipline, respect, and skill that was needed to be a great boxer.

== The Contender ==
Lange was a contestant on the first season of the NBC reality TV show, The Contender, produced and hosted by Sylvester Stallone and Sugar Ray Leonard. Stallone's brother attended one of Jimmy's boxing matches in Washington DC and was so impressed, he recommended him for the show as one of the 16 boxers. The show's special adviser, "First Lady of Boxing" Jackie Kallen served as 'den mother' on the show.

On the show, Jimmy was placed on the East Coast team and fought Joey Gilbert in the final First Round fight, a fight Lange lost. Lange was originally scheduled to fight Anthony Bonsante however, an argument ensued over Bonsante choosing not to do so—possibly seeing Lange as a greater threat.

Lange was voted back to fight in the top "fan favorite" fight at the show's finale where he beat contestant Tarick Salmaci in a majority decision.

== Professional career ==
Lange was trained by highly regarded Don Turner who has worked previously with former world champions Evander Holyfield and Larry Holmes, among others. He became the WBE Junior Middleweight title holder after defeating local opponent Perry Ballard in a 4th-round TKO in his hometown of Fairfax, Virginia on September 17, 2005.

Lange fought a rematch with Joey Gilbert on February 18, 2006, at the Patriot Center in Fairfax, Virginia for the vacant NABO middleweight title. He lost the fight by TKO in the third round.

Lange returned to the Patriot Center on October 7, 2006, to fight Tommy Wilt. The former Contender star managed a TKO victory with 15 seconds remaining in the 10th and final round. Lange made his fourth consecutive appearance at the Patriot Center on December 9, 2006, fighting Fontaine Cabell for the WBC Continental Americas Jr. Middleweight title. The 12 round fight ended in a draw.

In early 2007, International Hall of Fame trainer, Angelo Dundee, who has worked with top notch boxers such as Muhammad Ali, Sugar Ray Leonard and George Foreman, returned to Northern Virginia to be Chief Second for Jimmy. Lange and Fontaine were scheduled for a rematch on May 12, 2007.

On May 12, 2007, Lange won the hard-fought battle with Fontaine Cabell and won the match with an eighth-round TKO and earned the WBC Continental Americas Super Welterweight title. A shoulder injury requiring surgery forced Lange to voluntarily relinquish the belt which is now held by Julio Cesar Chavez Jr.

On November 1, 2008, at the Patriot Center in Fairfax, Virginia, in his first fight since the surgery, Jimmy appeared back in top form by winning a unanimous decision over Grover Wiley. In May 2009, he followed that fight up winning the WBC's USNBC belt via fifth-round TKO of Frank Houghtaling.

Lange looked sharp in dismantling his former Contender teammate Jonathan Reid with a ninth-round TKO to retain his WBC belt on September 26, 2009, at the Patriot Center. Six months later he returned to the Fairfax venue and lost his belt in a 12-round decision to Chase Shields on March 6, 2010. After the tough defeat, Lange got back on the winning streak with a pair of convincing victories over Jimmy LeBlanc (July 10, 2010, Patriot Center) and Mike McFail (August 20, 2010, Greensboro, NC).

He kept the unbeaten streak going scoring a dramatic 10th-round knockout of Joe Wyatt to capture the North American Boxing Association's U.S. 154-pound title on November 6, 2010, at the Patriot Center. Lange returned to the Patriot Center on March 12, 2011, and defeated Jimmy "The Fighting School Teacher" Holmes for his fourth straight win. He earned his 36th win with a unanimous decision over Mike McFail on June 25, 2011, in Virginia Beach.

Headlining his 13th show in front of his hometown fans at the familiar confines of the Patriot Center on September 10, 2011, Jimmy beat Raul Munoz by 6th-round TKO to capture the World Boxing Union (WBU) championship. He successfully defended his WBU title and added the North American Boxing Union (NABU) with a 12-round unanimous shutout decision against Ruben Galvan on February 11, 2012 - his seventh consecutive win and 14th headlining event at the Patriot Center.

== Professional boxing record ==
39 Wins (25 knockouts, 13 decisions), 6 Losses, 2 Draws
Result	Opponent	Type	Rd., Time	Date	Location	Notes
Win	(United States) Mike Sawyer	TKO	5 (8)	October 17, 2015	(United States) Fairfax, VA	
Loss	(United States) Tony Jeter	Decision (majority)	10 (10)	November 15, 2014	(United States) Fairfax, VA	
Loss	(United States) Tony Jeter	Decision (split)	10 (10)	October 27, 2012	(United States) Fairfax, VA	
Win	(United States) Ruben Galvan	Decision (unanimous)	12 (12)	11 February 2012	(United States) Fairfax, VA	Retains WBU title, adds NABU title
Win	(Mexico) Raul Munoz	TKO	6 (10)	10 September 2011	(United States) Fairfax, VA	Won WBU junior middleweight title
Win	(United States) Mike McFail	Decision (unanimous)	6 (6)	25 June 2011	(United States) Virginia Beach, VA	
Win	(United States) Jimmy Holmes	Decision (unanimous)	10 (10)	12 March 2011	(United States) Fairfax, VA	
Win	(United States) Joe Wyatt	KO	10 (10)	6 November 2010	(United States) Fairfax, VA	Won NABA U.S. super welterweight title
Win	(United States) Mike McFail	Decision (unanimous)	6 (6)	20 August 2010	(United States) Greensboro, NC	
Win	(United States) Jimmy LeBlanc	KO	2 (10)	10 July 2010	(United States) Fairfax, VA	Retained WBC USNBC super welterweight title
Loss	(United States) Chase Shields	Decision (unanimous)	10 (10)	March 6, 2010	(United States) Fairfax, VA	Lost WBC USNBC super welterweight title
Win	(United States) Jonathan Reid	RTD	9 (12)	26 September 2009	(United States) Fairfax, VA	Retained WBC USNBC super welterweight title
Win	(United States) Frank Houghtaling	RTD	5 (12)	2 May 2009	(United States) Fairfax, VA	Won WBC USNBC super welterweight title
Win	(United States) Grover Wiley	Decision (unanimous)	10 (10)	1 November 2008	(United States) Fairfax, VA	
Win	(United States) Fontaine Cabell	TKO	8 (12)	12 May 2007	(United States) Fairfax, VA.	Won WBC Continental Americas light middleweight title
Draw	(United States) Fontaine Cabell	Draw	12 (12)	9 December 2006	(United States) Fairfax, VA	
Win	(United States) Thomas Wilt	TKO	10 (10), 2:45	7 October 2006	(United States) Fairfax, VA	
Loss	(United States) Joey Gilbert	TKO	3 (12)	18 February 2006	(United States) Fairfax, VA	For vacant WBO NABO middleweight title
Win	(United States) Perry Ballard	TKO	4 (12)	17 September 2005	(United States) Fairfax, VA	Won WBE light middleweight title
Win	(United States) Tarick Salmaci	Decision (majority)	5 (5)	24 May 2005	(United States) Las Vegas, NV	
Loss	(United States) Joey Gilbert	Decision (unanimous)	5 (5)	7 September 2004	(United States) Pasadena, CA	
Win	(United States) Gabriel Rodriguez	Decision (split)	10 (10)	1 May 2004	(United States) Washington, DC	
Win	(United States) Gabriel Rodriguez	TKO	7 (10), 2:32	28 February 2004	(United States) Washington, DC	
Win	(United States) Joshua Smith	Decision (unanimous)	10 (10)	13 December 2003	(United States) Washington, DC	
Win	(United States) Homer Gibbins	TKO	3 (10)	16 September 2003	(United States) Lake Charles, LA	
Win	(United States) Chad Greenleaf	Decision (unanimous)	8 (8)	10 May 2003	(United States) Washington, DC	
Win	(United States) Charles Clark	Decision (unanimous)	8 (8)	15 March 2003	(United States) Washington, DC	
Win	(United States) Gerald Reed	Decision (majority)	8 (8)	17 January 2002	(United States) Washington, DC	
Win	(United States) Vincent White	TKO	5 (8), 0:55	17 January 2002	(United States) Glen Burnie, MD	
Win	(Cuba) Alex Perez	TKO	1 (8), 2:59	15 November 2001	(United States) Glen Burnie, MD	
Win	(United States) Samuel Harvey	TKO	2 (6), 2:35	31 August 2001	(United States) Baltimore, MD	
Win	(United States) James Johnson	TKO	5 (8), 2:40	10 May 2001	(United States) Glen Burnie, MD	
Win	(United States) Ed Goins	TKO	2 (6), 1:40	16 November 2000	(United States) Glen Burnie, MD	
Win	(United States) Kevin Carter	TKO	3 (6), 1:22	21 September 2000	(United States) Glen Burnie, MD	
Win	(United States) Donnie Parker	Decision (points)	6 (6)	12 March 2000	(United States) Washington, DC	
Win	(United States) Benji Singleton	Decision (unanimous)	6 (6)	18 November 1999	(United States) Glen Burnie, MD	
Win	(United States) Drew Hayes	KO	5 (6), 2:04	30 September 1999	(United States) Glen Burnie, MD	
Win	(United States) Dewayne Holland	KO	1	27 August 1999	(United States) Annandale, VA	
Win	(United States) Jason Floss	TKO	2	23 July 1999	(United States) Washington, DC	
Draw	(United States) James Johnson	Draw	4 (4)	13 May 1999	(United States) Glen Burnie, MD	
Win	(United States) Andre Gaskins	TKO	4 (4), 2:58	25 March 1999	(United States) Glen Burnie, MD	
Win	(United States) Travis Clybourn	KO	1	28 February 1999	(United States) Alexandria, VA	
Win	(United States) Matt Hill	TKO	1 (4), 2:41	28 January 1999	(United States) Glen Burnie, MD	
Win	(United States) Anthony Boykin	TKO	1	24 November 1998	(United States) Washington, DC	
Loss	(United States) Kevin Collins	Decision (majority)	4 (4)	27 March 1998	(United States) Westbury, NY	
Win	(United States) Scott Mitchell	TKO	1	14 March 1998	(United States) Lima, OH	
Win	(United States) Robert Hunt	TKO	1 (4)	22 February 1998	(United States) Washington, DC	
