= Tommy Gallagher (trainer) =

American boxer

Thomas Gallagher is a boxing trainer best known for his role on reality show The Contender as a profane and straight-shooting trainer and coach. In 2014, Gallagher was a cast member of season 2 of Esquire Network's White Collar Brawlers. Gallagher trained WBC welter-weight champion Andre Berto when he was an amateur and now coaches a team of amateurs at Inferno Gym Naples, Florida.

As an amateur fighter, Gallagher won a Golden Gloves title in 1959, but was prevented from turning pro due to a kidney problem.

Gallagher since has worked almost forty years as a trainer, manager, promoter, and gym owner and operator. He has been a factor in the careers of such boxers as Doug DeWitt, Vito Antuofermo, Don Lalonde, Lou Savarese, Sergei Kobozev, Segundo Mercado, Merqui Sosa and Johnny Turner.

Gallagher is married with four children and nine grandchildren.
