= Against the Ropes =

- Theatrical release poster
- Directed by: Charles S. Dutton
- Written by: Cheryl Edwards
- Produced by: Robert W. Cort; David Madden
- Starring: Meg Ryan; Omar Epps; Tony Shalhoub; Tim Daly; Kerry Washington; Charles S. Dutton
- Cinematography: Jack Green
- Edited by: Eric L. Beason
- Music by: Michael Kamen
- Production company: Cort/Madden Productions
- Distributed by: Paramount Pictures
- Release date: February 20, 2004
- Running time: 111 minutes
- Country: United States
- Language: English
- Budget: $39 million
- Box office: $6.6 million

Against the Ropes is a 2004 American sports drama film directed by Charles S. Dutton and starring Meg Ryan and Omar Epps. The story is a fictionalized account of boxing manager Jackie Kallen, the first woman to achieve success in the sport. Kallen has a bit part in the film playing a reporter. The film was shot primarily at the Wolstein Center in Cleveland, Ohio and Hamilton, Ontario at the Copps Coliseum.

Against the Ropes was released in the United States by Paramount Pictures on February 20, 2004 and received negative reviews from critics. It grossed $7 million against a budget of $39 million.

== Plot ==
At a young age, Jackie Kallen learns about boxing with her father and uncle in a small gym. Later, she becomes assistant to a Cleveland boxing promoter. Her boss then begins doing business with Sam LaRocca, a sports manager, during a middleweight championship fight.

Challenged after the contest to demonstrate an understanding of the fight game, she proceeds to embarrass LaRocca, who then offers to sell the loser's contract to her for the price of one dollar. She accepts, only to discover upon visiting the fighter in his home that he is addicted to drugs and enmeshed in a dangerous and self-destructive lifestyle.

Enter Luther Shaw, a small-time hood. Kallen watches in horror and fascination as Shaw pummels the former middleweight champ. She offers to manage him professionally. Shaw is at first hesitant, but eventually signs on with her.

Because of LaRocca's influence, Kallen can't find Shaw a fight anywhere in Ohio, so the two are forced to go on the road until Shaw makes a name for himself. Jackie begins to get swept up in all the attention she gets for being the first female boxing manager. Her attention eventually shifts from Shaw to her own media persona as her fighter's number of wins continues to climb.

Finally realizing that she is not paying enough attention to her only client, Kallen agrees to sell Shaw's contract to LaRocca on the condition that he be given a championship fight. LaRocca agrees, setting Shaw up for a shot at the title before he could be ready. Kallen arrives at the fight and stands in Shaw's corner as he pulls off an upset and wins the championship.

== Cast ==
- Meg Ryan as Jackie Kallen
  - Skye McCole Bartusiak as Little Jackie Kallen
- Omar Epps as Luther Shaw
- Tony Shalhoub as Sam LaRocca
- Tim Daly as Gavin Reese
- Kerry Washington as Renee
- Joe Cortese as Abel
- Charles S. Dutton as Felix Reynolds

== Reception ==
=== Box office ===
Against the Ropes was a box office bomb, grossing $6.6 million against an estimated budget of $39 million. It opened up at No. 8 at the box office, grossing $3,038,546 in the opening weekend. The film was released on February 20, 2004, to 1,601 theaters (widest release) gathering an average of $1,897 per theater. The film closed its box office run after seven weeks, gathering a total of $5.9 million from the domestic market and $712,321 from other territories for an worldwide total of $6.6 million.

=== Critical response ===
The film received negative reviews from critics. On Rotten Tomatoes it has a 11% approval rating, based on 132 reviews with an average rating of 4.2/10, summarizing it as "a bland, dumbed-down package of sports cliches." On Metacritic, it has a score of 36 out of 100 based on 36 critics, indicating "generally unfavorable" reviews.

A. O. Scott of The New York Times commended the performances for displaying "flashes of idiosyncrasy and flair" despite the "pedestrian script" but was critical of the film overall for having various "inspirational sports-movie clichés" and "competence that is more flat-footed than inspiring" in both the drama and boxing scenes. Marrit Ingman of The Austin Chronicle found Ryan "predictably fine" in the "plum role" of Jackie Kallen but criticized Dutton and Edwards for relying too much on "the well-worn underdog formula" when telling her story and not focusing on more "meatier" issues outside of the movie's text. Scott Tobias of The A.V. Club wrote that: "True to form, Against The Ropes favors a much tamer version of the real thing, never getting into the deep fissures that led to the real-life Kallen's long estrangement with Toney. Right up to the ludicrous finale and an even more improbable denouement, everything rings Hollywood-false. More galling still, the filmmakers' inventions take the zing out of the facts." Nick Schager of Slant Magazine criticized the film for being a "lackluster melodrama" with a script containing "corny clichés and metaphors" that uses prejudice to add color to their story, concluding that: "While Dutton's fight scenes are directed with reasonable panache, the rest of the film's visuals are so blandly static that one can imagine the ease with which Against the Ropes will be pan-and-scanned for television."

Roger Ebert gave it 3 out of 4 star review, remarking: "It works near the end of "Against the Ropes," a biopic about Jackie Kallen, who was (and is) the first female fight promoter in the all-male world of professional boxing. It works, and another cliche works, too: the Big Fight scene, right out of "Rocky" and every other boxing movie, in which the hero gets pounded silly but then somehow, after becoming inspired between rounds, comes back and is filled with skill and fury."

== See also ==
- List of boxing films
