= Jackie Kallen =

American boxing manager

Jackie Kallen (born Jackie Kaplan, April 23, 1946) is one of boxing's first and most successful female managers. Her life was the inspiration for the 2004 film Against the Ropes, starring Meg Ryan as Kallen, in which she had a brief speaking role as a reporter. She also worked as a consultant for Mark Burnett's reality TV series The Contender.

Kallen was inducted into the International Boxing Hall of Fame in the Non-Participant category as part of the class of 2024.

== Early life ==
Kallen was raised in a middle-class Jewish family in Detroit, Michigan, United States.

== Career ==
A show business journalist for a magazine in the 1970s, Kallen interviewed the Rolling Stones, Frank Sinatra, Elvis Presley and countless others. In 1977 she was assigned to interview a boxing prospect from the Kronk gym in Detroit, Michigan, Thomas Hearns. Kallen became fascinated with sports and began working as a sports journalist specializing in boxing.

Kallen spent a decade as Hearns' publicist as Hearns went on to face Sugar Ray Leonard in two championship fights. In the process she became well known around Detroit's boxing circles but met with sexism along the way.

Kallen made her managerial debut with heavyweight Bobby Hitz in 1988. She managed her first champion in 1991, James Toney knocking out Michael Nunn in eleven rounds to win the IBF world Middleweight title. Another Kallen fighter, Bronco McKart, won the WBO world Jr. Middleweight title in 1996.

Her business relationship with Toney was controversial but allowed her to gain celebrity among boxing's hard-core fans. She was featured in Ring and KO Magazine. Kallen referred to Toney many times as someone she loved like a son.

Kallen was diagnosed both with heart disease and cancer starting in the year 2000, but after multiple surgeries she recovered and is enjoying good health.

Kallen is the author of two books - "Hit Me With Your Best Shot" and "Between the Ropes". She is also the subject of Peter Mann's book "Against the Odds: The Jackie Story." Kallen makes appearances nationwide as a motivational speaker and currently lives in the Detroit area and manages three professional boxers, including Mykquan Williams and Sam Rizzo.

In December 2021, it was announced that Kallen is producing The Legend of Jack and Diane, a feature film described as a female-led revenge thriller directed by Bruce Bellocchi and starring Tom Sizemore, Lydia Zelmac, David Tomlinson, Robert LaSardo, and Carlo Mendez. Rick Geller is executive producer of the film. Filming began in Los Angeles on January 17, 2022, in Los Angeles.

== Personal life ==
Jackie was married to Gary Kallen from 1966 to 1997.

== See also ==
- Aileen Eaton
