= Juan de la Rosa =

Mexican boxer

Personal information
- Nickname: El Gallo Negro
- Nationality: Mexican; American
- Born: Juan Pedro de la Rosa; 7 August 1986 (age 40) Tamaulipas, Mexico
- Height: 5 ft 10 in (1.78 m)
- Weight: Super Middleweight; Middleweight

Boxing career
- Reach: 72 in (183 cm)
- Stance: Orthodox

Boxing record
- Total fights: 25
- Wins: 21
- Win by KO: 16
- Losses: 4
- Draws: 1

Juan Pedro de la Rosa (born August 7, 1986) is a Mexican professional boxer. He is the brother of welterweight boxer James de la Rosa.

== Personal life ==
De la Rosa's father is Mexican and his mother is an African-American. His paternal grandfather played a pivotal role in his formative years and, as a tribute, De la Rosa wears his portrait in a lanyard around his neck just before and after every fight.

== Professional career ==
De la Rosa turned professional at the age of 15.

=== The Contender ===
He was the youngest contestant on reality TV show The Contender at the age of 18. On the show, he was placed on the "East Coast" team and fought Tarick Salmaci in the second to last First Round fight. This bout of Youth versus Experience and was won by the young Mexican. Juan later drew criticism for allowing himself to be withdrawn from the competition with apparently minor injuries. His withdrawal left room for Ahmed Khaddour to strut his way back into the show.

Since starring on The Contender, De la Rosa's promise has somewhat diminished. Although he has continued to fight, his two losses to Mikel Williams have led some to question whether he has been a protected fighter. De la Rosa lost to Mexican veteran Fernando Vela via split decision at the Casa de Amistad in Harlingen, Texas in March 2008, returned a year later to defeat a solid journeyman Guadalupe Martínez. He was also scheduled to fight Glen Tapia on October 27, 2012, but pulled out 2 weeks before the fight citing an injury.

On November 2, 2013, De la Rosa finally made his return to the ring, after more than 4 1/2 years away from competition, in the co-main event at State Farm Arena, Hildalgo Texas. De la Rosa fought toe-to-toe with undefeated Anatoli Muratov until Muratov folded under De la Rosa's brutal body attack in the 5th round.

== Professional boxing record ==
26 fights	21 wins	4 losses
By knockout	16	2
By decision	5	2
Draws	1	
No contests	0	

No.	Result	Record	Opponent	Type	Round, time	Date	Location	Notes
26	Loss	21–4–1	(United States) Jas Phipps	TKO	1 (6), 0:51	2014-11-08	(United States) Events Center, Pharr, Texas, USA	
25	Win	21–3–1	(Kazakhstan) Anatoli Muratov	KO	5 (6), 2:45	2013-11-02	(United States) State Farm Hidalgo Arena, Harlingen, Texas, USA	
24	Win	20–3–1	(United States) Guadalupe Martinez	UD	8	2009-03-28	(United States) Harlingen Field, Harlingen, Texas, USA	
23	Loss	19–3–1	(Mexico) Fernando Vela	SD	8	2008-03-28	(United States) Municipal Auditorium, Harlingen, Texas, USA	
22	Win	19–2–1	(Mexico) Jose Humberto Corral	TKO	6 (12), 1:21	2007-10-26	(United States) Casa de Amistad, Harlingen, Texas, USA	Won IBA Continental Middleweight title.
21	Win	18–2–1	(Turkey) Nurhan Suleymanoglu	TKO	6 (10), 2:30	2007-07-20	(United States) Casa de Amistad, Harlingen, Texas, USA	
20	Loss	17–2–1	(United States) Mikel Williams	UD	10	2007-05-12	(United States) Paragon Casino, Marksville, Louisiana, USA	
19	Win	17–1–1	(United States) Victor Lares	TKO	5 (8), 2:40	2007-02-23	(United States) Casa de Amistad, Harlingen, Texas, USA	
18	Loss	16–1–1	(United States) Mikel Williams	TKO	8 (8), 2:58	2006-10-21	(United States) Altas Palmas Park, Donna, Texas, USA	
17	Win	16–0–1	(United States) Taronze Washington	UD	8	2006-08-04	(United States) Dodge Arena, Hidalgo, Texas, USA	Won USA Texas State Super welterweight title.
16	Win	15–0–1	(United States) Tremayne Hines	KO	1 (6), 2:59	2006-02-03	(United States) Dodge Arena, Hidalgo, Texas, USA	
15	Win	14–0–1	(United States) Jesse Orta	UD	5	2005-10-15	(United States) Staples Center, Los Angeles, California, USA	
14	Win	13–0–1	(Lebanon) Tarick Salmaci	UD	5	2004-09-05	(United States) Pasadena, California, USA	
13	Win	12–0–1	(Mexico) Gamaliel Mendoza	TKO	1 (6)	2004-06-04	Mexico	
12	Win	11–0–1	(Mexico) Ramiro Gonzalez	TKO	1 (6)	2004-03-19	Mexico	
11	Win	10–0–1	(Mexico) Thomas Cabrales	KO	1 (4)	2004-02-27	Arena Coliseo, Reynosa, Mexico	
10	Win	9–0–1	(United States) Noe Pena Jr.	TKO	2 (6), 0:55	2004-02-19	(United States) Dodge Arena, Hidalgo, Texas, USA	
9	Win	8–0–1	(United States) David Cid	TKO	1 (6)	2003-11-28	Mexico	
8	Win	7–0–1	(Mexico) Bernardo Arellano	KO	2 (6)	2003-10-24	Mexico	
7	Win	6–0–1	(Mexico) Walter Herrera	UD	4	2003-06-06	Mexico	
6	Win	5–0–1	(Mexico) Mario Carillo	KO	2 (4)	2003-03-28	Mexico	
5	Win	4–0–1	(Mexico) Ernesto Montoya	KO	2 (4)	2002-12-07	Mexico	
4	Draw	3–0–1	(Mexico) Jorge Deciga	PTS	4	2002-11-15	Mexico	
3	Win	3–0	(Mexico) Martin Trevino	TKO	2 (4)	2002-09-28	Mexico	
2	Win	2–0	(Mexico) Omar Chavez	KO	1 (4)	2002-08-30	Arena Coliseo, Reynosa, Mexico	
1	Win	1–0	(Mexico) Rogelio Montalvo	TKO	1 (4)	2002-08-02	Mexico	

== See also ==
- Afro-Mexicans
