= Sergio Mora =

American boxer

Personal information
- Nickname: The Latin Snake
- Born: December 4, 1980 (age 45) East Los Angeles, California, U.S.
- Height: 6 ft 0 in (1.83 m)
- Weight: Super middleweight Middleweight; Light middleweight Welterweight

Boxing career
- Reach: 75 in (191 cm)
- Stance: Orthodox

Boxing record
- Total fights: 36
- Wins: 29
- Win by KO: 9
- Losses: 5
- Draws: 2

Sergio Mora (born December 4, 1980) is an American former professional boxer. He is a former WBC light middleweight champion, and twice challenged for the WBA (Regular) middleweight title. He was the first winner of NBC's The Contender series.

== Amateur career ==
As an amateur, he had a record of 40 wins and 10 losses, losing on points in the quarterfinals of the 1998 national Golden Gloves, the semifinals of the 1999 U.S. national championships, and in the challengers' bracket final of the 2000 U.S. Olympic trials.

== Boxing career ==
=== Early career ===
He is the champion of reality TV show The Contender. The show was structured as a single elimination tournament between middleweight boxers. Mora entered the show with a 12-0 record. On the first fight of the show, Mora defeated Najai Turpin, a contestant who later committed suicide. In the Quarter Finals he was put up against the favored Ishe Smith, beating him to reach the semifinals. He then fought Jesse Brinkley and defeated him after seven rounds, earning a place to box against Peter Manfredo in the final. In the final fight Mora defeated Manfredo in a seven-round unanimous decision to become the show's champion. Months later, he defeated Manfredo by split decision in an 8-round rematch.

It was rumoured that Mora was to fight WBC and WBO middleweight title holder Jermain Taylor at some point during 2007. However, on March 15, 2007, Mora turned down a seven figure fight against Taylor that would have taken place in Memphis, Tennessee, which Mora felt was too close to Taylor's home of Little Rock, Arkansas. Mora felt that if the fight were to go to the scorecards, the judges would favour Taylor. With only 18 career bouts at the time, Mora also felt he lacked experience to challenge for a world title.

He was to fight Kassim Ouma (25-3-1 15 KOs) in a middleweight bout on September 15, 2007. It was to be televised on HBO as one of the undercard bouts supporting the main event, Márquez vs. Barrios. However, the event was canceled after Marquez suffered an injury during training. Mora made his return to the ring after 14 months against Elvin Ayala on October 16, 2007, at The Home Depot Center. The 10-round fight ended in a split draw as Ayala outworked Mora in the first half of the fight, but Mora rallied the 2nd half of the fight.

On January 11, 2008, Sergio Mora stopped Rito Ruvalcaba in the sixth round of their scheduled 10-round middleweight fight at the Casino Morongo. Mora was behind on two of three judges' scorecards entering the sixth round. He hurt Ruvalcaba with a combination, drove him to the ropes and landed another left hand, at which point the referee stopped the fight. Ruvalcaba was still punching at the time of the stoppage, leading to some controversy.

=== WBC light middleweight championship ===
On June 7, 2008, Mora defeated Vernon Forrest via a 12-round majority decision to become the WBC super welterweight champion. In the build-up to the fight, Forrest threatened to send Mora "out on a stretcher" and referred to him as the "pretender" (parodying "Contender"). However, Mora succeeded in pulling off the upset victory. Forrest took an early lead in what began as a tactical bout, working behind a left jab and landing right hands. Mora started to force his way into the fight in the fourth round, throwing hard punches to Forrest's body and consistently outworking the defending champion. Mora ultimately won a majority decision, with scores of 114-114, 115-113 and 116-112. After the fight, Forrest said that he had taken Mora lightly and cited that he did not train properly for the fight, resulting in his lack of punches thrown in the match.

Forrest (41-3) reclaimed his WBC 154-pound title on September 14, 2008, defeating Mora via unanimous decision. Forrest scored a knock down in round seven, had Mora in trouble in round nine and on his back foot for a majority of the bout. Mora had problems making weight for the rematch, having to lose two pounds after failing the initial weigh-in, and after the fight said that he did not expect the quick turnaround on the rematch clause and had needed more time to make the weight properly, resulting in his poor performance.

=== Cancelled Pavlik fight ===
After the two fights with Forrest, Mora made a move up in weight and was to fight then middleweight champion Kelly Pavlik. Pavlik would postpone the bout due to a nagging staph infection. Mora would attempt to keep the fight alive but ultimately it never happened, keeping Mora inactive for almost 2 years. After pulling out of the fight with Mora, Kelly Pavlik went on to lose against Sergio Martínez.

On April 3, 2010, in his first fight in over eighteen months, Mora defeated Calvin Green by 7th-round TKO on the Bernard Hopkins-Roy Jones Jr. 2 undercard. Mora dominated a game Green, fighting with him primarily on the inside landing combinations against him with his quicker hands. He hurt Green several times in the fight, and the ref had finally seen enough after an unanswered salvo of punches from Sergio in the 7th round.

=== Mora vs. Mosley, Vera ===
Mora fought Shane Mosley on September 18 at the Staples Center in Los Angeles. The bout ended up being a controversial split draw. The judges' scores were: 115–113 Mora, 116–112 Mosley and 114–114. Boxrec scored the fight 114-112 for Shane Mosley. Punch stats showed that Mosley landed 161 of 522 punches (31%) compared to 93 of 508 thrown (18%) by Mora. The decision was booed by the crowd, who began chanting "Canelo! Canelo!" Mosley felt the decision was fair, "We both fought hard. It was good fight, a good decision."

Mora's next fight was against fellow Contender participant Brian Vera. The bout was the main-event on ESPN2's Friday Night Fights on February 4, 2011. Mora lost to Vera by split decision.

Mora then took a stay-busy fight in November 2011 against Jose Flores, whom he defeated by corner stoppage before the eighth round began. Mora would then rematch against Vera on August 11, 2012. The fight was closely contested, but Mora lost to Vera again via majority decision. Mora had trouble making Vera respect his punching power. The two judges who scored the fight for Vera came under scrutiny as their cards were widely believed to be too wide.

=== Later career ===
Mora bounced back with a unanimous decision win against former world title challenger Grzegorz Proksa, in a fight televised on ESPN's Friday Night Fights. Mora would go on a 5-win streak as he kept busy trying to secure another world title shot. Mora got wins over opponents like Dashon Johnson during this time.

On February 6, 2015, Mora was scheduled to face IBF titleholder Jermain Taylor on ESPN2 Friday Night Fights for Taylor's middleweight belt in Biloxi, Mississippi. The fight was however canceled, due to Taylor being arrested after an altercation where he threatened a family at the MLK Day parade in Little Rock. Mora fought against Abraham Han on the same scheduled date for the USBA middleweight title. Mora won the fight by split decision, with scores of 115-112, 114-113 and 112-115. Mora was knocked down in round 3 by a left hook, but the referee ruled it a slip. Mora was knocked down once again in round 9, this time receiving a count.

On August 1, 2015, Mora faced off against WBA (Regular) champion Daniel Jacobs. Jacobs started the fight tentatively, but was able to time and counter Mora with a right hook that put the latter on the canvas. Mora was able to return the favor when Jacobs tried to apply pressure to get a quick stoppage. The fight would then be stopped when Mora retired after injuring his right foot in round 2. After the fight, Jacobs once again said he was looking to fight Quillin.

Jacobs went on to defeat former middleweight titlist Peter Quillin. In September 2016, Jacobs rematched Mora. He complained that the fight was a step back for him, as he thought he'd beaten Mora convincingly the first time. On fight night, Jacobs scored two flash knockdowns in rounds 4 and 5 before getting a dominant TKO win. Mora went down three times in round 7 before the referee halted the contest.

In 2020, Mora made a quiet announcement on his decision to retire from boxing.

== Professional boxing record ==
36 fights	29 wins	5 losses
By knockout	9	2
By decision	20	3
Draws	2	

No.	Result	Record	Opponent	Type	Round, time	Date	Location	Notes
36	Win	29–5–2	Alfredo Angulo	SD	8	Apr 7, 2018	Hard Rock Hotel and Casino, Las Vegas, Nevada, U.S.	
35	Loss	28–5–2	Daniel Jacobs	TKO	7 (12), 2:08	Sep 9, 2016	Santander Arena, Reading, Pennsylvania, U.S.	For WBA (Regular) middleweight title
34	Loss	28–4–2	Daniel Jacobs	TKO	2 (12), 2:55	Aug 1, 2015	Barclays Center, Brooklyn, New York, U.S.	For WBA (Regular) middleweight title
33	Win	28–3–2	Abraham Han	SD	12	Feb 6, 2015	Beau Rivage Resort & Casino, Biloxi, Mississippi, U.S.	Won vacant USBA middleweight title
32	Win	27–3–2	Dashon Johnson	UD	8	Dec 11, 2014	Pechanga Resort & Casino, Temecula, California, U.S.	
31	Win	26–3–2	Samuel Rogers	TKO	5 (8), 2:55	May 31, 2014	Tropicana Hotel & Casino, Las Vegas, Nevada, U.S.	
30	Win	25–3–2	Milton Nunez	KO	5 (8), 2:53	Nov 16, 2013	Citizens Business Bank Arena, Ontario, California, U.S.	
29	Win	24–3–2	Grzegorz Proksa	UD	10	Jun 28, 2013	Veterans Coliseum, Jacksonville, Florida, U.S.	
28	Loss	23–3–2	Brian Vera	MD	12	Aug 11, 2012	Illusions Theater at the Alamodome, San Antonio, Texas, U.S.	For vacant WBO-NABO middleweight title
27	Win	23–2–2	Jose Alfredo Flores	RTD	7 (10), 3:00	Nov 5, 2011	Fantasy Springs Resort Casino, Indio, California, U.S.	
26	Loss	22–2–2	Brian Vera	SD	10	Feb 4, 2011	Fort Worth Convention Center, Fort Worth, Texas, U.S.	
25	Draw	22–1–2	Shane Mosley	SD	12	Sep 18, 2010	Staples Center, Los Angeles, California, U.S.	
24	Win	22–1–1	Calvin Green	TKO	7 (10), 1:50	Apr 3, 2010	Mandalay Bay Casino, Las Vegas, Nevada, U.S.	
23	Loss	21–1–1	Vernon Forrest	UD	12	Sep 13, 2008	MGM Grand Garden Arena, Las Vegas, Nevada, U.S.	Lost WBC light middleweight title
22	Win	21–0–1	Vernon Forrest	MD	12	Jun 7, 2008	Mohegan Sun Casino, Montville, Connecticut, U.S.	Won WBC light middleweight title
21	Win	20–0–1	Rito Ruvalcaba	TKO	6 (10), 1:22	Jan 11, 2008	Morongo Casino, Cabazon, California, U.S.	
20	Draw	19–0–1	Elvin Ayala	SD	10	Oct 16, 2007	Home Depot Center, Carson, California, U.S.	
19	Win	19–0	Eric Regan	UD	10	Aug 25, 2006	ARCO Arena, Sacramento, California, U.S.	
18	Win	18–0	Archak TerMeliksetian	TKO	7 (10), 2:44	May 4, 2006	The Aladdin, Las Vegas, Nevada, U.S.	
17	Win	17–0	Peter Manfredo Jr.	SD	8	Oct 15, 2005	Staples Center, Los Angeles, California, U.S.	
16	Win	16–0	Peter Manfredo Jr.	UD	7	May 24, 2005	Caesars Palace, Las Vegas, Nevada, U.S.	Won "The Contender" Championship
15	Win	15–0	Jesse Brinkley	UD	7	Sep 24, 2004	Pasadena, California, U.S.	Televised as part of NBC's "The Contender"
14	Win	14–0	Ishe Smith	SD	5	Sep 12, 2004	Pasadena, California, U.S.	Televised as part of NBC's "The Contender"
13	Win	13–0	Najai Turpin	UD	5	Aug 27, 2004	Hollywood, California, U.S.	Televised as part of NBC's "The Contender"
12	Win	12–0	Les Ralston	UD	8	May 15, 2004	DePaul Athletic Center, Chicago, Illinois, U.S.	
11	Win	11–0	Damon Franklin	UD	6	Feb 13, 2004	Quiet Cannon, Montebello, California, U.S.	
10	Win	10–0	Oriol Martinez	TKO	2 (6)	Dec 12, 2003	Casino Del Sol, Tucson, Arizona, U.S.	
9	Win	9–0	Damone Wright	UD	6	Jul 26, 2003	Grand Olympic Auditorium, Los Angeles, California, U.S.	
8	Win	8–0	Adam Stewart	UD	4	May 2, 2003	Plaza Hotel & Casino, Las Vegas, Nevada, U.S.	
7	Win	7–0	Richard Gonzalez	UD	6	Nov 21, 2002	Compaq Center, San Jose, California, U.S.	
6	Win	6–0	Warren Kronberger	TKO	3 (6), 2:42	Jun 27, 2002	Marriott Hotel, Irvine, California, U.S.	
5	Win	5–0	George Moreno	TKO	4 (4), 1:49	Apr 19, 2002	Quiet Cannon, Montebello, California	
4	Win	4–0	Sean Holley	UD	4	Mar 29, 2001	Arrowhead Pond, Anaheim, California, U.S.	
3	Win	3–0	Charles Blake	UD	4	Jan 18, 2001	Arrowhead Pond, Anaheim, California, U.S.	
2	Win	2–0	Eric Benito Tzand	UD	4	Oct 19, 2000	Arrowhead Pond, Anaheim, California, U.S.	
1	Win	1–0	Antonio Maldonado	SD	4	Aug 17, 2000	Arrowhead Pond, Anaheim, California, U.S.	

== See also ==
- List of world light-middleweight boxing champions
- List of Mexican boxing world champions

Preceded by Inaugural Champion	The Contender Champion; 2005	Succeeded by Grady Brewer
Preceded by Vernon Forrest	WBC Super Welterweight Champion; June 7, 2008–September 14, 2008	Succeeded by Vernon Forrest
