= Jesse Brinkley =

American boxer

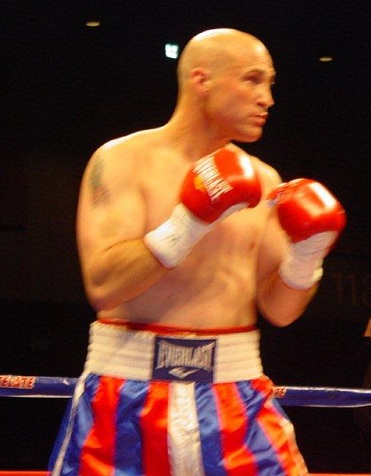
- Born: Jesse Lee Brinkley; November 14, 1976 (age 49); Yerington, Nevada, U.S.
- Height: 5 ft 10 in (178 cm)
- Weight: 167.5 lb (76.0 kg)
- Division: Super middleweight
- Stance: Orthodox
- Fighting out of: Las Vegas, Nevada, U.S.
- Years active: 14 (1997–2011)

Professional boxing record
- Total: 42
- Wins: 35
- By knockout: 22
- Losses: 7
- By knockout: 4

Other information
- Website: http://www.jessebrinkley.com
- Boxing record from BoxRec
- Last updated on: January 29, 2010

Jesse Lee Brinkley (born November 14, 1976) is a former American professional boxer. He challenged once for the IBF Super Middleweight title in 2010.

== Personal life ==
Brinkley comes from the town of Yerington, Nevada, where he is an active hunter and fisherman. He has been described by NBC as "the class clown". He lives with his longtime girlfriend and their two young children.

== Boxing career ==
Brinkley disliked wearing headgear and hated the amateur point scoring system - so he turned professional quickly. His dream was to fight the legendary boxer Oscar De La Hoya. He also has a tattoo which is of a scorpion.

In 2004, he entered reality tv show The Contender, and was placed on the West Coast Team. Having seen his teammate Gomez beat the highest-ranked boxer in the competition (Manfredo), he took on the second-highest ranked, Jonathan Reid, and won. His Quarter Final fight saw him having to lose a pounds in an hour to make the weight restriction against Anthony Bonsante, but he won anyway - getting into the semi-finals, albeit in a battered and bruised state. He lost his semi-final against the eventual winner Sergio Mora, and went on to lose the 3rd Place Fight to Alfonso Gomez in a good action fight.

On May 10, 2006 Brinkley fought the undefeated Joey Spina. He was well in control of the fight when in the eleventh round he was hit with a devastating hard body shot and Brinkley crumbled into the corner the referee was forced to stop the fight.

In 2008, in a clash of former boxing TV reality contestants, he took on Otis Griffin, the winner of reality TV show The Next Great Champ on Fox. Brinkley stopped Griffin in the 11th round at the Silver Legacy Reno in Reno, Nevada. Brinkley won the vacant WBC USNBC Super Middleweight title with the victory.

On February 14, 2009, Brinkley fought longtime rival Joey Gilbert at The Reno Events Center in Reno, NV. Brinkley scored a knockdown in the fifth round with a right cross that severely broke Gilbert's nose. Gilbert spent most of the early portion of the fight trying to use movement to frustrate Brinkley, but did not add punches with that movement so Brinkley easily won most of the early rounds. Later in the fight Gilbert started to hold his ground more and made the fight more competitive, but Brinkley still had the upper hand in most of their exchanges. Brinkley went on to win the match via a wide unanimous decision.

Brinkley fought Mike Paschall on July 10, 2009 and won by unanimous decision.

On January 29, 2010, Brinkley fought Curtis "Showtime" Stevens in Reno as part of ESPN2's Friday Night Fights. The bout was an IBF Title Eliminator bout giving the winner an IBF ranking of No. 2. Stevens claimed that Brinkley would not last fifty seconds in the ring with him beforehand, and started the fight aggressively, landing several hard hooks to Brinkley's face in the 1st round, causing swelling over Jesse's right eye very early, but Brinkley weathered the initial storm of Stevens, and outboxed/outfought him in an entertaining fight, dropping Stevens in the 6th and 12th rounds en route to a wide decision win, 117-109, 118-108, 119-107.

On October 15, 2010 Brinkley fought against the IBF Super Middleweight champion Lucian Bute in Montreal, Canada. Brinkley was knocked down twice in rounds five and eight before being stopped in the ninth round.

On April 29, 2011 Brinkley fought Peter Quillin in Reno, Nevada, for the vacant United States Boxing Organisation Super Middleweight Championship. Brinkley lost by TKO in the third round.

== Professional Titles ==
- APBA West Coast Middleweight Title (2003)
- WBC United States (USNBC) Super Middleweight Title (2006)

== Professional boxing record ==
42 fights	35 wins	7 losses
By knockout	22	4
By decision	13	3
Draws	0	
No contests	0	

No.	Result	Record	Opponent	Type	Round, time	Date	Location	Notes
42	Loss	35–7	(United States) Peter Quillin	TKO	3 (10), 2:34	2011-04-29	(United States) Reno Events Center, Reno, Nevada, USA	For vacant USBO super middleweight title.
41	Loss	35–6	(Romania) Lucian Bute	KO	9 (12), 2:48	2010-10-15	Bell Centre, Montreal, Quebec, Canada	For IBF super middleweight title.
40	Win	35–5	(United States) Curtis Stevens	UD	12	2010-01-29	(United States) Grand Sierra Resort, Reno, Nevada, USA	Retained WBC United States (USNBC) super middleweight title.
39	Win	34–5	(United States) Mike Paschall	UD	10	2009-07-10	(United States) Reno Events Center, Reno, Nevada, USA	
38	Win	33–5	(United States) Joey Gilbert	UD	12	2009-02-14	(United States) Reno Events Center, Reno, Nevada, USA	Retained WBC United States (USNBC) super middleweight title.
37	Win	32–5	(United States) James Johnson	TKO	3 (6), 1:54	2008-12-20	(United States) Howard U Burr Arena, Washington, D.C., USA	
36	Win	31–5	(Canada) Jason Naugler	UD	12	2008-06-13	(United States) Reno Ballroom, Reno, Nevada, USA	Retained WBC United States (USNBC) super middleweight title.
35	Win	30–5	(United States) Otis Griffin	TKO	11 (12), 0:24	2008-02-22	(United States) Silver Legacy Resort & Casino, Reno, Nevada, USA	Won vacant WBC United States (USNBC) super middleweight title.
34	Win	29–5	(United States) Isaiah Henderson	TKO	1 (10), 2:05	2007-10-20	(United States) Silver Legacy Resort & Casino, Reno, Nevada, USA	
33	Win	28–5	(United States) Dallas Vargas	KO	9 (10), 2:59	2007-07-06	(United States) Eldorado Hotel Casino, Reno, Nevada, USA	
32	Win	27–5	(United States) Luis Lopez	TKO	6 (10), 1:27	2007-06-14	(United States) Coeur d'Alene Casino, Worley, Idaho, USA	
31	Loss	26–5	(United Kingdom) Robin Reid	UD	8	2007-03-30	(United Kingdom) Metro Radio Arena, Newcastle, England	
30	Loss	26–4	(United States) Joe Spina	TKO	11 (12), 1:50	2006-05-10	(United States) Foxwoods Resort Casino, Ledyard, Connecticut, USA	For WBC United States (USNBC) super middleweight title.
29	Win	26–3	(United States) Anthony Bonsante	UD	5	2005-10-15	(United States) Staples Center, Los Angeles, California, USA	
28	Loss	25–3	(Mexico) Alfonso Gómez	UD	5	2005-05-24	(United States) Caesars Palace, Paradise, Nevada, USA	
27	Loss	25–2	(United States) Sergio Mora	UD	7	2004-09-24	(United States) Pasadena, California, USA	
26	Win	25–1	(United States) Anthony Bonsante	TKO	5 (5), 2:24	2004-09-21	(United States) Pasadena, California, USA	
25	Win	24–1	(United States) Jonathan Reid	UD	5	2004-08-21	(United States) Pasadena, California, USA	
24	Win	23–1	(United States) Cleveland Corder	KO	9 (10), 2:59	2004-03-11	(United States) Coeur d'Alene Casino, Worley, Idaho, USA	
23	Win	22–1	(United States) Danny Perez	UD	10	2003-08-15	(United States) Stodick Park, Gardnerville, Nevada, USA	
22	Win	21–1	(United States) Joe Garcia	KO	2 (8), 1:10	2003-07-11	(United States) City Center Pavilion, Reno, Nevada, USA	
21	Win	20–1	(United States) Cleveland Corder	TKO	1 (12), 2:24	2003-06-02	(United States) Coeur d'Alene Casino, Worley, Idaho, USA	
20	Win	19–1	(Mexico) Miguel Angel Ruiz	TKO	3 (10), 2:58	2002-10-24	(United States) Coeur d'Alene Casino, Worley, Idaho, USA	
19	Win	18–1	(United States) Cabien St Pierre	TKO	6 (6), 2:34	2002-06-07	(United States) Eldorado Hotel Casino, Reno, Nevada, USA	
18	Win	17–1	(Mexico) Sandro Haro	UD	6	2001-11-04	(United States) Peppermill Hotel Casino, Reno, Nevada, USA	
17	Win	16–1	(United States) Cabien St Pierre	UD	6	2001-08-24	(United States) Harrah's Hotel Casino, Reno, Nevada, USA	
16	Win	15–1	(United States) Ken Hulsey	TKO	1 (6), 0:59	2001-04-01	(United States) Peppermill Hotel Casino, Reno, Nevada, USA	
15	Win	14–1	(Mexico) Antonio Garcia	TKO	2 (6), 1:23	2001-02-11	(United States) Peppermill Hotel Casino, Reno, Nevada, USA	
14	Win	13–1	(United States) Kennedy McCullough	TKO	4 (6), 2:03	2000-12-17	(United States) Peppermill Hotel Casino, Reno, Nevada, USA	
13	Win	12–1	(United States) Edward Brown	TKO	6 (6), 2:09	2000-11-17	(United States) Peppermill Hotel Casino, Reno, Nevada, USA	
12	Win	11–1	(Mexico) Juan Carlos Barreto	UD	6	2000-08-13	(United States) Peppermill Hotel Casino, Reno, Nevada, USA	
11	Win	10–1	(Nicaragua) Roger Benito Flores	UD	6	2000-06-24	(United States) Peppermill Hotel Casino, Reno, Nevada, USA	
10	Win	9–1	(United States) Jason Dietrich	TKO	2 (6), 1:28	2000-01-14	(United States) Orleans Hotel & Casino, Paradise, Nevada, USA	
9	Win	8–1	(United States) Roy Smith	TKO	1 (6), 1:20	1999-09-04	(United States) Casino West, Yerington, Nevada, USA	
8	Win	7–1	(United States) Raul Jesus Gonzales	PTS	4	1999-07-02	(United States) Fresno Fair Pavilion, Fresno, California, USA	
7	Win	6–1	(United States) Jaime Javier Garcia	KO	2 (4), 2:42	1999-05-15	(United States) Table Mountain Casino, Friant, California, USA	
6	Win	5–1	(United States) William Amato	KO	1 (4)	1998-11-14	(United States) San Diego, California, USA	
5	Loss	4–1	(Mexico) Concepcion Gutierrez	TKO	2 (4)	1998-07-25	(United States) Club Cal Neva, Reno, Nevada, USA	
4	Win	4–0	(United States) Mark Urioste	TKO	1 (4)	1998-07-18	(United States) Casino West, Yerington, Nevada, USA	
3	Win	3–0	(United States) Israel Sandoval	PTS	4	1998-03-30	(United States) Radisson Hotel, Sacramento, California, USA	
2	Win	2–0	(United States) Ernest Pargas	KO	1 (4), 0:32	1998-02-20	(United States) Veterans Memorial Auditorium, Petaluma, California, USA	
1	Win	1–0	(United States) Koji Kotera	TKO	1 (4), 1:22	1997-07-19	(United States) Casino West, Yerington, Nevada, USA	
