= The Contender (TV series) =

- Created by: Mark Burnett
- Presented by: Sylvester Stallone; Sugar Ray Leonard; Tony Danza; Andre Ward
- Starring: Tommy Gallagher; Jeremy Williams; Dub Huntley; Buddy McGirt; Pepe Correa; Carlos Vargas; Freddie Roach; Naazim Richardson
- Theme music composer: Hans Zimmer
- Composers: Jeff Lippencott; Mark T. Williams; Ah2 Music
- Country of origin: United States
- Original language: English
- No. of seasons: 5
- No. of episodes: 47

Production
- Executive producers: Mark Burnett; Eric Van Wagenen
- Production location: Los Angeles, California
- Production companies: Mark Burnett Productions; DreamWorks Television (2005–09); ESPN Original Entertainment (2006–08); MGM Television (2018); Paramount Television (2018)

Original release
- Network: NBC
- Release: March 7, 2005 – January 7, 2009
- Network: ESPN
- Release: July 18, 2006 – November 6, 2007
- Network: Versus
- Release: December 3, 2008 – January 7, 2009
- Network: Epix
- Release: August 24 – November 9, 2018

The Contender is an American reality television series that initially aired from March 3, 2005, to January 7, 2009, on NBC, ESPN, and Versus and later revived on Epix. Each season of the series follows a group of boxers as they compete with one another in an elimination-style competition, while their lives and relationships with each other and their families are depicted.

The first three seasons of the show were hosted by Sugar Ray Leonard, who shared hosting duties in the first season with actor Sylvester Stallone. Leonard departed the series after season three and Tony Danza joined as his replacement.

On January 22, 2018, it was announced that the series was being revived by premium cable network Epix for a fifth season which premiered on August 24, 2018.

== Premise ==
The show takes the format of a gameshow, with the boxers divided into two teams based on their place of residence in the United States: East Coast or West Coast (or simply “East” and “West”). These teams live together in group living quarters in Pasadena, California, in the historic Royal Laundry Building on Raymond Avenue, and compete for the right to choose which of their team members fights that week, and whom he fights against. Most of the second half of the hour-long episodes are devoted to that fight; the loser is eliminated.

== Production ==
The Contender was created and executive produced by Mark Burnett. During its original run, it was a co-production between Burnett's production company and DreamWorks Television, with DreamWorks' co-founder Jeffrey Katzenberg serving as an executive producer.

The series’ tagline is “The Next Great Human Drama”, and its soundtrack was scored by Hans Zimmer. Before the show premiered, rival American television Fox network rushed to air a competing show, The Next Great Champ, hosted by Oscar De La Hoya. The show performed very poorly, with the final episodes being relegated to cable FSN. In an effort to distance itself from the Fox disaster, NBC opted to hold airing its show until spring 2005.

On May 16, 2005, the series was cancelled. The first season cost NBC $2,000,000 per episode. Reruns were seen on CNBC. On August 11, 2005, ESPN announced that it was picking up the rights to a second season of the show, which began airing on the network in July 2006, although special editions under the Contender title are currently airing as of March, 2006. ESPN also announced that it has options to renew the series for two additional seasons. However, on April 10, 2008, ESPN announced that it was canceling the series. Executive producer Jeff Wald maintained that the show would continue on another network. It was later announced the show would move to Versus.

=== Najai Turpin suicide ===
On February 14, 2005, one of the 16 contenders, Najai Turpin, despondent over personal matters, committed suicide, shooting himself while sitting with his girlfriend in a parked car outside the West Philadelphia gym where he trained. In his memory, the producers set up a trust fund for his daughter Anyae. The show still aired in its entirety, with a special tribute to Turpin.

== Seasons ==
Season	Network	Airdate	Presenter	Trainers	Winner	Runner up
1	NBC	March 7 – May 24, 2005	Sylvester Stallone; Sugar Ray Leonard	Tommy Gallagher; Jeremy Williams; Dub Huntley	Sergio Mora “The Latin Snake”	Peter Manfredo Jr. “The Pride of Providence”
2	ESPN	July 18 – September 26, 2006	Sugar Ray Leonard	Tommy Gallagher; Jeremy Williams	Grady Brewer “Bad Boy”	Steve Forbes "2 Pound”
3	ESPN	September 4 – November 6, 2007	Sugar Ray Leonard	Buddy McGirt; Pepe Correa	Sakio Bika “The Scorpion”	Jaidon Codrington “The Don”
4	Versus	December 3, 2008 – January 7, 2009	Tony Danza	Tommy Brooks; John Bray	Troy Ross “The Boss”	Ehinomen Ehikhamenor “Hino”
5	Epix	August 24 – November 9, 2018	Andre Ward	Freddie Roach; Naazim Richardson	Brandon Adams “The Cannon”	Shane Mosley Jr.

== Broadcast and home media ==
The show ran for fifteen weeks through 2005 on NBC in the United States of America. The show ran in the UK on ITV2 and was repeated later in the week on ITV and now airs on ITV4. It also aired on AXN in India, and on the Spanish language network Telemundo. The second season, featuring welterweight contenders, premiered in the United States on Tuesday, July 18, 2006, at 10pm ET/PT, on ESPN. The third season, featuring super middleweight contenders, premiered in the United States on Tuesday, September 4, 2007, at 10pm ET/PT, on ESPN. The fourth season, featuring cruiserweight contenders, premiered in the United States on Wednesday, December 3, 2008, at 10pm ET/PT, on Versus.

The first four seasons were made available on Paramount's free streaming service Pluto TV. Paramount acquired distribution rights to the first season after purchasing DreamWorks' live-action film and television studios in February 2006, with the next three seasons being produced while DreamWorks Television operated as a division of Paramount.

A fifth season produced by Mark Burnett and hosted by Andre Ward aired on Epix in 2018. The fifth season was handled by Paramount Television and MGM Television, as DreamWorks Television folded in 2013, while Mark Burnett Productions was absorbed into MGM in 2015.

== International versions ==
Country	Title	Broadcaster	Presenters	Original run	Trainers
Asia	The Contender Asia	AXN	Stephan Fox & Jaymee Ong	January 16, 2008 – April 23, 2008	
Australia	The Contender Australia	Fox8	Charlotte Dawson & Daniel Amalm	3 November 2009	Billy Hussien (Blue Team) & Paul Briggs (Gold Team)
Ukraine	Ти чемпіон Ty chempion	TRK Ukrayina	Kostya Tszyu, Denis Nikiforov & Alina Shaternikova	October 17, 2010 – December 12, 2010	

== See also ==
- The Contender Challenge: UK vs. USA
