= Gary Balletto =

American boxer

Personal information
- Nickname: Tiger
- Nationality: American
- Born: Gary Balletto; May 21, 1975 (age 51) Providence, Rhode Island
- Weight: Lightweight

Boxing career
- Stance: Orthodox

Boxing record
- Total fights: 36
- Wins: 31
- Win by KO: 26
- Losses: 3
- Draws: 2
- No contests: 0

Gary Balletto (born May 21, 1975) is an American professional boxer. He has won 3 lightweight titles since 1996 (IBU, EBA and USBF). In his hometown of Providence, Rhode Island, Balletto is the New England representative for the Joint Association of Boxers (JAB).

Balletto turned pro just ten days before his 21st birthday, amassing a 30–3–2 record in a 10-year career of boxing, 26 by way of knock out. One of his three losses came to Michael Clark (a unanimous decision in 10 rounds at Foxwoods), who would later appear on the ESPN reality show "Contender Season 2" as a team-mate of Balletto, where they both were on the Gold Team. Another loss came to Gregorio Vargas, a former WBC Featherweight champion and IBA Super-Featherweight champion, to whom Balletto lost his IBU title.

On the show, Balletto won his first-round fight, where Aaron Torres chose him as an opponent, by split decision. In his second fight, Norberto Bravo beat him, by unanimous decision.

In 2008, he appeared at IFC Theater in New York City to promote a feature verity documentary "Sweet Dreams", which told the story of his life and efforts to unionize the sport through JAB.

Balletto continued his boxing career, winning by technical knockout on against light welterweight prospect Matthew Strode.

In June 2013, Balletto sustained a spinal cord injury in his backyard playing with his son, spinning around on a pull up bar that gave way. He broke 6 vertebrae in his neck, leaving him with a C5 spinal cord injury. He is now a quadriplegic, paralyzed from the chest down, and confined to a power wheelchair. Determined to fight this battle as he has all of his bouts in the ring, he has not let the injury slow him down. In 2017, Balletto founded “The Gary Tiger Balletto Foundation” to bring awareness to and provide resources and assistance to those with paralysis injuries.

His current efforts include the creation of the first affordable adaptive gym in the state of Rhode Island, in conjunction with the Cranston YMCA. He has already raised funds and donated two Functional Electric Stimulation bikes which are booked and used around the clock, by Balletto himself and others with paralysis injuries to maintain muscle health and prevent atrophy.

There is additional equipment being added to complete a full, comprehensive adaptive gym. The gym was set to open to members of the local community with like injuries and other conditions such as stroke, MS, etc. to come and work out alongside their family members by spring 2019.

Balletto resides in Cranston, Rhode Island, with his fiancee and children.

== Professional boxing record ==
36 fights	31 wins	3 losses
By knockout	26	0
By decision	5	3
Draws	2	
No contests	0	

No.	Result	Record	Opponent	Type	Round, time	Date	Location	Notes
36	Win	31–3–2	(United States) Matthew Strode	TKO	9 (10), 0:59	2006-12-01	(United States) Convention Center, Providence, Rhode Island, USA	
35	Loss	30–3–2	(United States) Norberto Bravo	UD	5	2006-02-06	(United States) Contender Gymnasium, Pasadena, California, USA	
34	Win	30–2–2	(United States) Aaron Torres	SD	5	2006-01-21	(United States) Contender Gymnasium, Pasadena, California, USA	
33	Loss	29–2–2	(Mexico) Gregorio Vargas	MD	12	2003-10-31	(United States) Convention Center, Providence, Rhode Island, USA	Lost IBU Lightweight title.
32	Win	29–1–2	(Mexico) Luis Alfonso Lizarraga	UD	10	2003-07-25	(United States) Foxwoods Resort Casino, Ledyard, Connecticut, USA	Retained IBU Lightweight title.
31	Win	28–1–2	(United States) Frank Houghtaling	KO	4 (10), 1:02	2003-05-30	(United States) Foxwoods Resort Casino, Ledyard, Connecticut, USA	
30	Win	27–1–2	(United States) Johnny Walker	KO	1 (12), 2:49	2003-03-21	(United States) Foxwoods Resort Casino, Ledyard, Connecticut, USA	Won vacant IBU Lightweight title.
29	Win	26–1–2	(Colombia) Juan Polo Perez	KO	1 (10)	2003-01-11	(United States) Dunkin' Donuts Center, Providence, Rhode Island, USA	
28	Loss	25–1–2	(United States) Michael Clark	UD	10	2002-10-25	(United States) Foxwoods Resort Casino, Ledyard, Connecticut, USA	
27	Win	25–0–2	(Trinidad and Tobago) Alric Johnson	KO	4 (10)	2002-07-26	(United States) Rhodes-on-the Pawtuxet, Cranston, Rhode Island, USA	Retained EBA Lightweight title.
26	Win	24–0–2	(United States) Mike DiBenedetto	TKO	9 (10), 2:37	2002-03-01	(United States) Foxwoods Resort Casino, Ledyard, Connecticut, USA	
25	Win	23–0–2	(United States) John Trigg	RTD	4 (6), 3:00	2001-12-07	(United States) Foxwoods Resort Casino, Ledyard, Connecticut, USA	
24	Win	22–0–2	(Colombia) Fray Luis Sierra	TKO	1 (10)	2001-11-16	(United States) Rhodes-on-the Pawtuxet, Cranston, Rhode Island, USA	
23	Win	21–0–2	(United States) Joseph Figueroa	UD	10	2001-06-02	(United States) Rhodes-on-the Pawtuxet, Cranston, Rhode Island, USA	Won EBA Lightweight title.
22	Win	20–0–2	(Dominican Republic) Freddy Cruz	UD	6	2001-05-04	(United States) Mohegan Sun Casino, Uncasville, Connecticut, USA	
21	Win	19–0–2	(United States) John Scalzi	TKO	1 (8)	2001-03-02	(United States) Rhodes-on-the Pawtuxet, Cranston, Rhode Island, USA	
20	Win	18–0–2	(Puerto Rico) Hector Arroyo	UD	6	2001-02-09	(United States) Foxwoods Resort Casino, Ledyard, Connecticut, USA	
19	Win	17–0–2	(United States) Larry O'Shields	TKO	4 (6), 1:20	2000-12-22	(United States) Foxwoods Resort Casino, Ledyard, Connecticut, USA	
18	Win	16–0–2	(United States) Richard Dinkins	TKO	3 (4)	2000-11-17	(United States) Rhodes-on-the Pawtuxet, Cranston, Rhode Island, USA	
17	Draw	15–0–2	(Guyana) Glenn Ford	PTS	6	2000-02-25	(United States) Rhodes-on-the Pawtuxet, Cranston, Rhode Island, USA	
16	Win	15–0–1	(Canada) Teddy Worth	TKO	2 (?)	1999-11-24	(United States) Rhodes-on-the Pawtuxet, Cranston, Rhode Island, USA	
15	Win	14–0–1	(United States) Duron Wilson	TKO	4 (?), 2:52	1999-01-29	(United States) Foxwoods Resort Casino, Ledyard, Connecticut, USA	
14	Win	13–0–1	(Guyana) Forbes David	KO	1 (?)	1998-12-12	(United States) The Roxy, Boston, Massachusetts, USA	
13	Win	12–0–1	(United States) Alonzo Sojourney	TKO	1 (?), 2:41	1998-10-24	(United States) Roseland Ballroom, Taunton, Massachusetts, USA	
12	Win	11–0–1	(Puerto Rico) Manuel Santiago	TKO	6 (?)	1998-08-02	(United States) TD Garden, Boston, Massachusetts, USA	
11	Win	10–0–1	(Dominican Republic) Felix Marti	TKO	6 (?)	1998-06-19	(United States) The Roxy, Boston, Massachusetts, USA	
10	Win	9–0–1	(Italy) Dominick Monaco	TKO	3 (?)	1998-06-05	(United States) The Roxy, Boston, Massachusetts, USA	
9	Win	8–0–1	(United States) Hector Querio	TKO	1 (?), 1:40	1998-03-27	(United States) The Roxy, Boston, Massachusetts, USA	
8	Win	7–0–1	(United States) Gerry Ocampo	KO	2 (4)	1998-02-20	(United States) The Roxy, Boston, Massachusetts, USA	
7	Win	6–0–1	(United States) Alex Ortiz	TKO	2 (4), 2:32	1997-12-05	(United States) The Roxy, Boston, Massachusetts, USA	
6	Win	5–0–1	(United States) Jose LaPorte	TKO	2 (?), 2:53	1997-10-23	(United States) The Roxy, Boston, Massachusetts, USA	
5	Win	4–0–1	(United States) Rafael Pina	TKO	1 (?)	1997-09-25	(United States) Strand Theatre, Providence, Rhode Island, USA	
4	Win	3–0–1	(United States) Barton Velez	KO	1 (?)	1997-03-13	(United States) Strand Theatre, Providence, Rhode Island, USA	
3	Win	2–0–1	(United States) Miguel Vasquez	TKO	1 (?)	1996-10-25	(United States) The Roxy, Boston, Massachusetts, USA	
2	Win	1–0–1	(Puerto Rico) Lucas Pacheco	TKO	1 (4)	1996-09-27	(United States) Eastside Improvement, Brockton, Massachusetts, USA	
1	Draw	0–0–1	(United States) Hector Querio	TD	1 (4)	1996-05-11	(United States) Dayville, Connecticut, USA	Professional debut. Technical draw after a headbutt rendered Balletto unable to continue.
