= The Contender Challenge: UK vs. USA =

- Starring: Sugar Ray Leonard, Barry McGuigan
- Countries of origin: United States, United Kingdom

Production
- Running time: Varies

Original release
- Network: ESPN (USA), ITV4 (UK)
- Release: 10 April – 17 April 2007

The Contender Challenge: UK vs. USA is a series of boxing matches on 30 March 2007, held at Metro Radio Arena, Newcastle, England. Six boxers from the US reality television shows The Contender and The Contender 2, in a team coached by Sugar Ray Leonard, took on six boxers from the UK, all promoted by Frank Warren, and coached by Barry McGuigan. The winning team was awarded the "Sugar Ray Leonard Cup", not unlike the Ryder Cup in Golf

The bouts was the basis of a TV series broadcast in the US by ESPN and in the UK by ITV4, with six episodes, beginning on 10 April 2007, with commentary by the well-known ESPN team of Joe Tessitore and Teddy Atlas, with the British boxing commentator John Rawling joining. Leonard and McGuigan provided some analysis through the fight as well.

The master of ceremonies throughout the tournament was Michael Pass.

== Format ==
Points were awarded to each team as follows:

Win	1 point
Draw	1/2-point
Tiebreaker	Total KO count

In the event of a tie, the total number of knockouts by each team would have determined the winner.

The bouts were scored in the American style, with three ringside judges and a non-scoring referee. British non-title bouts are scored solely by the referee.

The referees and judges were of both nationalities.

== Matchups ==
The matchups, all scheduled for eight rounds with weights ranging from welterweight to light heavyweight, were:

US	vs.	UK
Walter Wright		Anthony Small
Freddy Curiel		Ross Minter
Alfonso Gomez		Martin Concepcion
Jerson Ravelo		Paul Buchanan
Jesse Brinkley		Robin Reid
Cornelius Bundrage		Colin McNeil

== Results ==
The matchup finished as a 4–2 US victory, with Curiel, Bundrage, Gomez and Ravelo winning for the US, and Small and Reid winning for the UK.

Episode	Original US air date	About the episode	Winner
1	4/10/07	Walter Wright was introduced to the crowd, and won some home-town appeal by wearing a Newcastle United jersey. Anthony Small walked to the ring wearing a Scream mask, carrying a riding crop that he called his "Yank spanker" in the interview. The fight was mainly consistent for the first seven rounds. Small fought a very unorthodox style, with his hands very far down, often by his knees, and used extreme bobbing and weaving. Small remained outside Wright's range, then jump in to score a quick, jabbing blow or two, weave to avoid counterpunches, then jump back out. Teddy Atlas, at ringside for ESPN, scored Small as having won five of the first seven rounds, losing only round 2 (where Wright timed him coming in to score before Small could punch), and tying round 7. In round 8, Wright found his rhythm, and opened a cut to Small's mouth, even apparently stunning him, but Wright was unable to score the knockout and Small won by split decision. Atlas, along with ringside commentators Tessitore and Rawling, noted the difficulty of scoring the fight, as Small's unusual style made him appear to be lacking aggression, which many judges look for.	UK
2	4/17/07	Freddy Curiel entered the ring with a 16–6–2 record and period of inactivity (he retired in 2002 and returned to the ring in 2006 for the Contender boxing reality show and had only one fight since losing in the first round of the show). Curiel's opponent was the younger and more recently active Ross "The Boss" Minter (son of former middleweight champ Alan Minter) with a record of 17–1–1. Minter also had his challenges with layoffs — although he had recently fought in 2007, he had only one fight in 2006 due to injuries. Minter, a popular boxer in the UK with a reputation as a considerate and polite competitor, dominated the early rounds of the fight. Minter was the bigger fighter and was in excellent condition which quickly showed with his power shots and gritty in-fighting. Unfortunately for Minter, he continued to be plagued by the cuts which had been seen in his previous fights. Minter was also able to open a cut on Curiel although it was disputed as being caused by a headbutt. While Minter was strong up to the seventh round of the eight round bout, Curiel's experience started to show and he began to land more authoritatively. In the eighth round Curiel's corner told him he had to score a KO pie win, although Teddy Atlas had the fight 67–66 for Minter—a close fight. Both fighters started the round with hard punches and Curiel's right eye started to swell dramatically. In the last minute of the round Curiel countered a wide right thrown by Minter with a laser straight hard right which dropped Minter to the canvas. Minter was out and Curiel pulled out a dramatic victory from what appeared to be a certain points loss. Curiel demonstrated considerable sportsmanship by walking Minter around the ring with his hand raised and encouraged the fans to applaud their local fighter.	US
3	4/24/07	Alfonso Gomez fought Martin Concepcion in the third match of the Challenge, getting a surprisingly friendly reception from the British crowd on his entrance due to his fan-friendly persona and style. He dominated the hard-punching Concepcion for the most part, with a combination of outboxing and infighting, dropping Concepcion in round 3 with a double left hook to the body and head, then in the 7th round finishing the courageous Concepcion with an uppercut that caused Concepcion to turn his back on Gomez in pain, necessitating a referee stoppage.	US
4	5/01/07	Jerson Ravelo fought Paul Buchanan in the fourth match of the Challenge. In a mostly tactical affair, Ravelo outboxed Buchanan and won via a wide unanimous decision.	US
5	5/08/07	Jesse Brinkley fought the former Super Middleweight champion Robin Reid in the fifth match of the Challenge. In a somewhat sloppy affair, Reid outworked Brinkley(in a slow fight) for the majority of the eight rounds, winning via unanimous decision.	UK
6	5/15/07	Cornelius Bundrage fought Colin McNeil in the last match of the Challenge. "K-9" Bundrage proved to be too physically strong for McNeil throughout, winning most of the rounds of a somewhat ugly fight, and eventually stopped him with a body shot in the 7th round.	US

Two other fights were not included in the official scoring on the card, Paul Smith(UK) vs Jonathan Reid(USA) and Nigel Wright(UK) vs Jonathan Nelson(USA). Smith beat Reid by a controversial stoppage in the 7th round, as Smith was winning the fight and seemed to have Reid hurt from a body shot earlier, but clearly pushed Reid to the canvas in the 7th round. The referee ruled the push correctly, but judged that Reid could not continue after he got up when Reid seemingly could still defend himself. Wright also stopped the outmatched Nelson, who was a late substitute, in the 2nd round of their fight on cuts. Neither of these matches counted towards the scoring of the challenge because ITV4 had issues with airtime, so only six fights of the Challenge could be shown on TV.

== Controversy ==
The tourney got off to a late start, which ITV representatives said was due to ESPN micromanaging the matchups to guarantee a US victory, explaining how non-Contender fighter Jerson Ravelo fought in a bout for the cup. The last three bouts were heckled by the crowd, with the last fight beginning at 2 am, and members of Team US jeering along with the ticketholders. Additionally, one apparently drunken fan verbally threatened the cornermen for Team US just before the main event, drawing the ire of the entire Minter family, who were apparently seated nearby. When the fan threw a keychain at the US corner, security ejected him, drawing cheers from the crowd.
