= International Boxing Union (since 1996) =

Professional boxing association

- International Boxing Union, Inc.
- Abbreviation: IBU
- Formation: 1996; 30 years ago
- Founded at: Atlanta, Georgia
- Legal status: Corporation
- Headquarters: 4175 Roswell Road NE Atlanta, Georgia, USA 30342
- Website: ibuboxing.com

The International Boxing Union (IBU) is a professional boxing sanctioning body founded in Atlanta, Georgia, United States, in 1996. It is unrelated to the International Boxing Union, based in Europe, which operated until the Second World War.

Although the IBU has sanctioned title matches and "world champions" from countries such as Barbados, Guyana, Germany, and Hungary, they often lack widespread recognition as the best fighters in their class. IBU titles can be a first title for boxers who progress to gain additional titles of the more recognized "Big Four".

== Notable champions ==
One notable former IBU Heavyweight Champion was Shannon Briggs, who had his title stripped in 2003 after refusing to face quality opponents. Briggs went on to win the WBO title a few years later, after defeating Sergei Liakhovich in November 2006. Another notable former IBU World Heavyweight Champion is "Fast" Eddie Chambers who captured the title in 2005.

The IBU also sports two notable former Lightweight Champions in Gary Balletto and Gregorio Vargas. Balletto was 29-1-2 before losing the IBU Lightweight title to Vargas in 2003. Balletto attempted a comeback in 2006 on ESPN's "The Contender". Other notable fights of the IBU were the two IBU World Super Middleweight title fights of Scott "The Sandman" Pemberton and Omar Sheika that became ESPN2's "Fight of the Year" in 2003 and 2004.

On 7 April 2012, 7-time multiple weight class World Champion James Toney captured the vacant IBU World Heavyweight championship with a TKO over World Heavyweight Bare Knuckle Championship Holder Bobby Gunn.
