= Sechew Powell =

American boxer

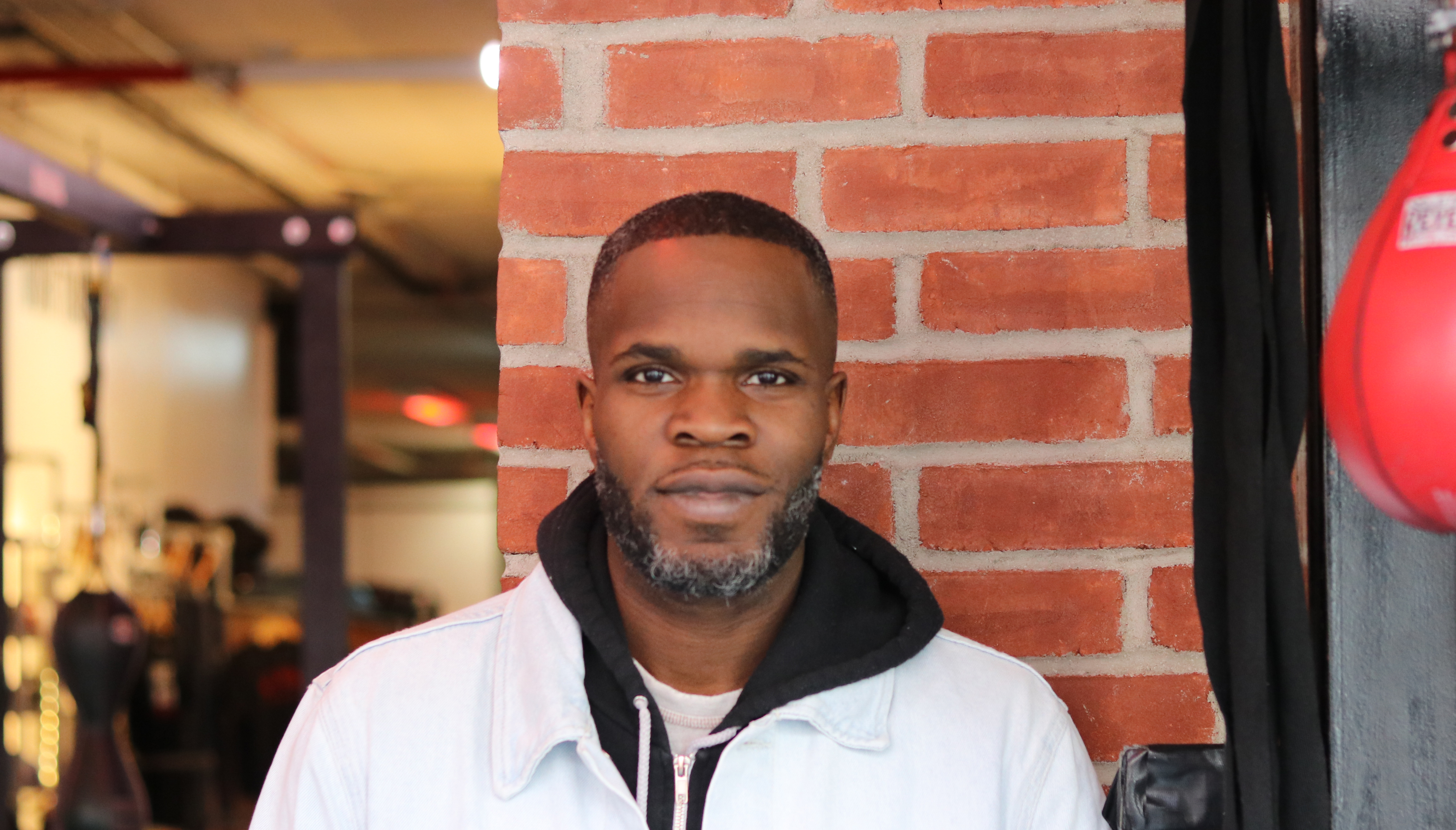

Personal information
- Nickname: Iron Horse
- Born: June 6, 1979 (age 47) Brooklyn, New York, U.S.
- Height: 5 ft 10 in (178 cm)
- Weight: Junior middleweight

Boxing career
- Reach: 74 in (188 cm)
- Stance: Southpaw

Boxing record
- Total fights: 32
- Wins: 26
- Win by KO: 15
- Losses: 6

Sechew Powell (born June 6, 1979) is an American former professional boxer who competed from 2002 to 2014 and challenged for the IBF junior middleweight title in 2011.

== Early life ==
Powell was born and raised in Brownsville, Brooklyn of Jamaican immigrant parents.

Powell’s father and former manager is Novric Powell. He is the brother of UFC mixed martial arts champion David Branch , whom Powell has helped train for fights, of college wrestler Novric Reese , and of fellow middleweight boxer Jamelle Hamilton, who has fought alongside Powell in multiple tournaments.

== Amateur career ==
Nicknamed "Iron Horse", Powell was an amateur standout. In a rare event, Powell and his brother Jamelle Hamilton were crowned co-champions of the 139-pound novice division in the Daily News Golden Gloves.

Powell was the 2000 National Golden Gloves Light Middleweight Champion and 2001 United States Amateur Light middleweight champion. He won the world under 19 championship in Baku, Azerbaijan in 1998 and received a full scholarship at the U.S. Olympic Education Center at Northern Michigan University in 2002, where he trained with coach Al Mitchell and studied forensic engineering and auto repair.

== Professional career ==
Powell turned pro in 2002 and was undefeated in his first 20 fights before losing to Kassim Ouma in 2006. In 2007, he won a close decision over Ishe Smith and had a KO win over Terrance Cauthen.

After racking up a 15-0 record, in May 2005 Powell met the also unbeaten Cornelius Bundrage. Seconds coming into the fight, Bundrage and Powell threw simultaneous right hands to each other's chin, resulting in an extremely rare double knockdown. In shock of the event the referee did not score any knockdowns and Powell immediately sent down Bundrage for the second time with a straight left, who fell two times while trying to stand up and the bout was stopped.

He trained with coach Buddy McGirt in his professional career. Powell also trained out of Gleason's Gym in Brooklyn.

On June 11, 2008 Powell fought Deandre Latimore at the Hard Rock Cafe in New York City. Powell entered the fight ranked #1 by the IBF in the junior middleweight division. Both men hurt each other repeatedly throughout the fight, but it was Latimore who came up big in the seventh round when he hurt Powell with a right hook. An uppercut rocked Powell along the ropes and his head was repeatedly snapped back as he absorbed punch after punch. With less than a minute left in the round, the referee stepped in and called it off, much to the dismay of Powell. At the time of the stoppage, all three judges had the fight even, 57-57.

Powell tested positive for marijuana in his post-fight drug test and was suspended for 60 days by the New York State Athletic Commission.

Powell avenged his loss to Latimore by fighting him again two years later and winning with a twelve-round majority decision in an IBF title eliminator in Durant, Oklahoma.

== Professional boxing record ==
32 fights	26 wins	6 losses
By knockout	15	2
By decision	11	4

No.	Result	Record	Opponent	Type	Round, time	Date	Location	Notes
32	Loss	26–6	Dmitry Mikhaylenko	UD	8	Aug 2, 2014	Revel Resort, Atlantic City, New Jersey, U.S.	
31	Loss	26–5	Gabriel Rosado	TKO	9 (12), 2:43	Jun 1, 2012	Sands Casino Resort, Bethlehem, Pennsylvania, U.S.	For vacant WBO Inter-Continental junior middleweight title
30	Loss	26–4	Cory Spinks	UD	12	Jan 28, 2012	Shrine Mosque Auditorium, Springfield, Missouri, U.S.	
29	Loss	26–3	Cornelius Bundrage	UD	12	Jun 25, 2011	The Family Arena, St. Louis, Missouri, U.S.	For IBF junior middleweight title
28	Win	26–2	Deandre Latimore	MD	12	Mar 19, 2010	Choctaw Gaming Center, Durant, Oklahoma, U.S.	
27	Win	25–2	Christian Lloyd Joseph	TKO	3 (12), 2:30	Jan 14, 2009	Seminole Hard Rock Hotel and Casino, Hollywood, Florida, U.S.	Won vacant IBA Intercontinental junior middleweight title
26	Win	24–2	Clarence Taylor	UD	8	Oct 11, 2008	Grand Casino, Hinckley, Minnesota, U.S.	
25	Loss	23–2	Deandre Latimore	TKO	7 (10), 2:11	Jun 11, 2008	Hard Rock Times Square, New York City, New York, U.S.	
24	Win	23–1	Kevin Finley	TKO	1 (10), 2:23	Feb 29, 2008	Paragon Casino & Resort, Marksville, Louisiana, U.S.	
23	Win	22–1	Terrance Cauthen	TKO	4 (12), 2:19	Dec 5, 2007	Seminole Hard Rock Hotel and Casino, Hollywood, Florida, U.S.	
22	Win	21–1	Ishe Smith	UD	10	Feb 17, 2007	Hammerstein Ballroom, New York City, New York, U.S.	
21	Loss	20–1	Kassim Ouma	UD	10	Aug 5, 2006	Madison Square Garden, New York City, New York, U.S.	
20	Win	20–0	Willie Lee	TKO	10 (10), 2:33	Jun 17, 2006	FedExForum, Memphis, Tennessee, U.S.	
19	Win	19–0	Robert Frazier	UD	10	Feb 3, 2006	Northern Quest Resort & Casino, Airway Heights, Washington, U.S.	
18	Win	18–0	Archak TerMeliksetian	UD	10	Nov 4, 2005	Buffalo Run Casino, Miami, Florida, U.S.	
17	Win	17–0	Santiago Samaniego	TKO	3 (10), 0:36	Aug 25, 2005	Hammerstein Ballroom, New York City, New York, U.S.	
16	Win	16–0	Cornelius Bundrage	TKO	1 (10), 0:22	May 6, 2005	Foxwoods Resort Casino, Ledyard, Connecticut, U.S.	
15	Win	15–0	Patrick Thompson	UD	8	Jan 21, 2005	Mohegan Sun Casino, Uncasville, Connecticut, U.S.	
14	Win	14–0	George Armenta	UD	10	Sep 30, 2004	The Grand Ballroom, New York City, New York, U.S.	
13	Win	13–0	Grady Brewer	SD	8	Jun 17, 2004	Harrah's Laughlin, Laughlin, Nevada, U.S.	
12	Win	12–0	Sergio Melendez	TKO	2 (8), 2:01	Apr 22, 2004	The Grand Ballroom, New York City, New York, U.S.	
11	Win	11–0	Kirk Douglas	KO	1 (6), 2:10	Feb 26, 2004	Sports Arena, San Diego, California, U.S.	
10	Win	10–0	James Johnson	TKO	1 (4), 2:28	Jan 9, 2004	Mohegan Sun Casino, Uncasville, Connecticut, U.S.	
9	Win	9–0	Terry Clark	TKO	2 (6), 1:46	Aug 8, 2003	Alltel Arena, North Little Rock, Arkansas, U.S.	
8	Win	8–0	Jamal Harris	UD	6	Apr 26, 2003	Foxwoods Resort Casino, Ledyard, Connecticut, U.S.	
7	Win	7–0	Sandro Haro	TKO	5 (6), 0:59	Mar 20, 2003	Michael's Eighth Avenue, Glen Burnie, Maryland, U.S.	
6	Win	6–0	Andres Larrinaga	TKO	5 (6), 2:34	Mar 6, 2003	Level Nightclub, Miami, Florida, U.S.	
5	Win	5–0	Bill Tipton	TKO	2 (6), 1:57	Jan 10, 2003	Mohegan Sun Casino, Uncasville, Connecticut, U.S.	
4	Win	4–0	Larry Brothers	UD	4	Nov 23, 2002	Boardwalk Hall, Atlantic City, New Jersey, U.S.	
3	Win	3–0	Jonathan Taylor	MD	4	Oct 23, 2002	Regent Hotel, New York City, New York, U.S.	
2	Win	2–0	Julio Cesar Montero	KO	2 (4), 0:58	Sep 23, 2002	National Guard Armory, Braintree, Massachusetts, U.S.	
1	Win	1–0	Aundalen Sloan	TKO	2 (4), 2:34	Aug 17, 2002	Trump Taj Mahal, Atlantic City, New Jersey, U.S.	
