= Jorge Barrios =

Jorge Barrios may refer to:

- Jorge Barrios (footballer) (born 1961), Uruguayan footballer/manager
- Jorge Rodrigo Barrios (born 1976), Argentine boxer
