= Rudy Cisneros =

American boxer

Rudy Cisneros
Profile
Born	August 9, 1981
Nationality	US American
Residence	Chicago, Illinois, U.S.
Classification	Middleweight
Boxing Record
Fights	17
Wins (KOs)	12 (11)
Losses	4
Draws	0
Results on Contender season 2
First Round	Lost to Norberto Bravo on points

Rudy Cisneros (born August 9, 1981) is a professional boxer, and was a contestant on the ESPN reality show "Contender Season 2". He is also studying architecture at Northern Michigan University.

Cisneros became a professional at age 22, and won the 1997 Chicago C.Y.O. Jr. Middleweight Championship, in a split decision over Matthew Podgorski. He was a 1999 Chicago Golden Gloves Open division runner-up, losing to Jimmy Gonzalez in the 147 lb. division. He won the 2000 Chicago Golden Gloves Open division 156 lb. title, beating David Estrada. He boxed internationally in 1997, with several wins in Ireland. In addition, he won a bronze medal in the 2004 US Olympic trials.

On the show "Contender Season 2", Cisneros was a member of the Gold Team. He fought in the second contest of the first round, having been chosen to face Norberto Bravo by the Blue Team. Bravo won a split decision.

On May 13, 2011, he was beaten by former Puerto Rican Olympic boxer Jonathan González. On May 5, 2012 Cisneros was stopped in the first round by former amateur world champion and Olympian, Demetrius Andrade.
