= Gregorio Vargas =

Mexican boxer

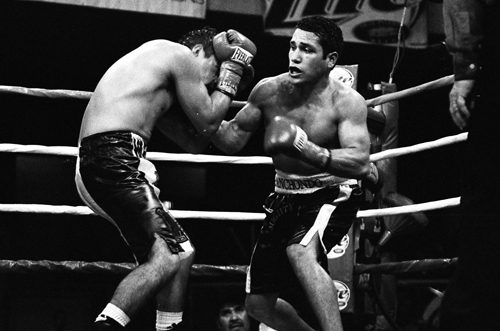
- Mike Anchondo vs. Goyo Vargas, 2003

Personal information
- Nickname: Goyo
- Born: Gregorio Vargas Hernández; 27 October 1970 (age 55) Cuautepec de Hinojosa, Hidalgo, Mexico
- Height: 5 ft 5 1/2 in (166 cm)
- Weight: Featherweight; Super featherweight; Lightweight

Boxing career
- Reach: 67 1/2 in (171 cm)
- Stance: Orthodox

Boxing record
- Total fights: 55
- Wins: 45
- Win by KO: 31
- Losses: 9
- Draws: 1

Gregorio Vargas Hernández, better known as Goyo Vargas (born 27 October 1970) is a Mexican retired professional boxer who held the WBC featherweight title in 1993.

== Professional career ==
Vargas was born in Santa María Natívitas, a small community located in the municipality of Cuautepec, Hidalgo, into a family of boxing aficionados. He was trained by his father since childhood and two brothers, Adán and Efraín, also became professional pugilists.

On 28 April 1993, Vargas won the WBC featherweight title from Paul Hodkinson by TKO in round 7. On 11 July 1998. He would lose the title in his first defense to New Yorker Kevin Kelley. Vargas would get another opportunity at a world title in his next fight, this time losing a unanimous decision to John John Molina.

Vargas retired in 2005.

== Professional boxing record ==
55 fights	45 wins	9 losses
By knockout	31	1
By decision	14	8
Draws	1	

No.	Result	Record	Opponent	Type	Round, time	Date	Location	Notes
55	Loss	45–9–1	Eleazar Contreras Jr	UD	12	2004-11-06	Grand Casino Coushatta, Kinder, Louisiana, U.S.	For vacant NABF lightweight title
54	Win	45–8–1	Reggie Sanders	TKO	3 (8), 1:51	2004-04-30	Estrella del Millennium Club, Elgin, Illinois, U.S.	
53	Loss	44–8–1	Mike Anchondo	UD	10	2003-12-11	Olympic Auditorium, Los Angeles, California, U.S.	
52	Win	44–7–1	Gary Balletto	MD	12	2003-10-31	Convention Center, Providence, Rhode Island, U.S.	Won IBU lightweight title
51	Win	43–7–1	Julio Sanchez Leon	UD	10	2003-04-25	Sandia Resort and Casino, Albuquerque, New Mexico, U.S.	
50	Win	42–7–1	Christopher Saluday	TKO	5 (10)	2002-10-26	Rizal Memorial Colleges Gym, Davao City, Philippines	
49	Win	41–7–1	Celso Delgado	TKO	7 (10)	2002-03-15	Guadalupe, Mexico	
48	Loss	40–7–1	Floyd Mayweather Jr.	UD	12	2000-03-18	MGM Grand Garden Arena, Paradise, Nevada, U.S.	For WBC super featherweight title
47	Win	40–6–1	Ricky Quiles	UD	12	1999-07-10	Grand Victoria Casino Elgin, Elgin, Illinois, U.S.	Won vacant WBC FECARBOX lightweight title
46	Win	39–6–1	Ben Tackie	UD	12	1999-01-16	MGM Grand Garden Arena, Paradise, Nevada, U.S.	Won WBC Continental Americas lightweight title
45	Win	38–6–1	Tracy Harris Patterson	TKO	6 (12), 1:06	1998-07-11	Alamodome, San Antonio, Texas, U.S.	Won IBA super featherweight title
44	Win	37–6–1	Cesar Delgado	KO	2 (8), 0:53	1998-05-01	Freeman Coliseum, San Antonio, Texas, U.S.	
43	Win	36–6–1	Andre Cray	TKO	9 (10), 1:10	1997-12-13	Concord Plaza Expo Center, Northlake, Illinois, U.S.	
42	Win	35–6–1	Khalil Shakeel	KO	9 (10), 0:19	1997-06-07	Hawthorne Race Course, Stickney, Illinois, U.S.	
41	Loss	34–6–1	Carlos Hernández	MD	10	1997-01-13	Great Western Forum, Inglewood, California, U.S.	
40	Win	34–5–1	Raul Hernandez	KO	7 (?)	1996-10-28	Great Western Forum, Inglewood, California, U.S.	
39	Win	33–5–1	Mark Reels	KO	4 (10)	1996-10-06	Sports Arena, Los Angeles, California, U.S.	
38	Win	32–5–1	Jose Luis Montes	PTS	10	1996-01-19	Navojoa, Mexico	
37	Win	31–5–1	Julian Romero	KO	5 (?)	1995-12-22	Ciudad Juárez, Mexico	
36	Win	30–5–1	Francisco Barajas	KO	2 (?)	1995-12-08	Arena Naucalpan, Naucalpan, Mexico	
35	Loss	29–5–1	John John Molina	UD	12	1994-04-22	Caesars Palace, Paradise, Nevada, U.S.	For IBF super featherweight title
34	Loss	29–4–1	Kevin Kelley	UD	12	1993-12-04	Reno-Sparks Convention Center, Reno, Nevada, U.S.	Lost WBC featherweight title
33	Win	29–3–1	Clifford Hicks	KO	3 (?)	1993-08-07	Morelia, Mexico	
32	Win	28–3–1	Paul Hodkinson	TKO	7 (12), 2:27	1993-04-28	National Stadium, Dublin, Ireland	Won WBC featherweight title
31	Win	27–3–1	Juan Carlos Ortigoza	TKO	11 (12)	1992-10-31	Culiacán, Mexico	Retained Mexican featherweight title
30	Win	26–3–1	Elias Quiroz	TKO	8 (12)	1992-07-27	Tulancingo, Mexico	Retained Mexican featherweight title
29	Win	25–3–1	Juan Carlos Salazar	KO	3 (12)	1992-05-22	Ciudad Juárez, Mexico	Retained Mexican featherweight title
28	Win	24–3–1	Antonio Hernandez	PTS	12	1992-04-12	Victoria de Durango, Mexico	Retained Mexican featherweight title
27	Win	23–3–1	Porfirio Hernandez	KO	1 (12)	1991-11-15	Cuernavaca, Mexico	Retained Mexican featherweight title
26	Win	22–3–1	Juan Carlos Ortigoza	UD	10	1991-10-12	Mexico City, Mexico	
25	Win	21–3–1	Jaime Fernandez	TKO	3 (12), 2:08	1991-06-28	La Paz, Mexico	Retained Mexican featherweight title
24	Win	20–3–1	Simon Gonzalez	PTS	12	1991-04-26	Ciudad Juárez, Mexico	Retained Mexican featherweight title
23	Win	19–3–1	Hector Ulises Chong	UD	12	1991-02-15	Arena Olímpico Laguna, Gómez Palacio, Mexico	Won vacant Mexican featherweight title
22	Draw	18–3–1	Narciso Valenzuela Romo	PTS	10	1990-10-19	Santa Rosalía, Mexico	
21	Win	18–3	Ramon Felix	KO	6 (?)	1990-09-03	Tijuana, Mexico	
20	Win	17–3	Ramon Jimenez	TKO	1 (?)	1990-06-29	Mexico City, Mexico	
19	Loss	16–3	Juan Carlos Salazar	UD	10	1990-05-05	Mexico City, Mexico	
18	Win	16–2	Lauro Rodriguez	PTS	10	1990-03-24	Arena México, Mexico City, Mexico	
17	Win	15–2	Martin Garcia	TKO	8 (?)	1990-02-09	Guadalajara, Mexico	
16	Win	14–2	Cesar Martinez	UD	10	1989-12-02	Mexico City, Mexico	
15	Loss	13–2	Jaime Fernandez	PTS	10	1989-08-18	La Paz, Mexico	
14	Win	13–1	Salvador Zamora	UD	10	1989-07-08	Mexico City, Mexico	
13	Win	12–1	Raymundo Marin	TKO	2 (?)	1989-06-10	Mexico City, Mexico	
12	Loss	11–1	Marco Antonio Ramirez	TKO	6 (10)	1989-04-28	Auditorio del Estado, Mexicali, Mexico	
11	Win	11–0	Herminio Hernandez	UD	10	1989-03-18	[Arena Coliseo, Mexico City, Mexico	
10	Win	10–0	Roberto Molina	TKO	2 (?)	1989-02-11	Mexico City, Mexico	
9	Win	9–0	Vladimir Gallegos	TKO	2 (?)	1989-01-14	Mexico City, Mexico	
8	Win	8–0	Oscar Burgos	PTS	8	1988-12-03	Mexico City, Mexico	
7	Win	7–0	Efrain Zepeda	TKO	3 (?)	1988-10-15	Mexico City, Mexico	
6	Win	6–0	Roberto Villareal	TKO	1 (?)	1988-09-25	Mexico City, Mexico	
5	Win	5–0	Rafael Briseno	TKO	1 (?)	1988-09-04	Arena Revolucion, Mexico City, Mexico	
4	Win	4–0	Cuauhtemoc Sanchez	TKO	1 (?)	1988-08-13	Mexico City, Mexico	
3	Win	3–0	Fernando Cervantes	KO	1 (?)	1988-07-09	Arena Coliseo, Mexico City, Mexico	
2	Win	2–0	Felipe Valladares	TKO	2 (?)	1988-06-04	Mexico City, Mexico	
1	Win	1–0	Raul Capitan	KO	2 (?)	1988-05-07	Arena Coliseo, Mexico City, Mexico	

== See also ==
- List of Mexican boxing world champions
- List of world featherweight boxing champions

Sporting positions
Regional boxing titles
Vacant Title last held by Javier Marquez	Mexican featherweight champion February 15, 1991 – April 28, 1993; Won world title	Vacant Title next held by César Soto
Vacant Title last held by Ruben Nevarez	WBC Continental Americas lightweight champion January 16, 1999 – 1999; Vacated	Vacant Title next held by John John Molina
Vacant Title last held by Juan Jose Prado	WBC FECARBOX lightweight champion July 10, 1999 – 1999; Vacated	Vacant Title next held by Juan Jose Prado
Minor World boxing titles
New title	IBA super-featherweight champion July 11, 1998 – 1998; Vacated	Vacant Title next held by Junior Jones
Preceded by Gary Balletto	IBU lightweight champion October 31, 2003 – 2004; Vacated	Vacant Title next held by László Bognár
Major World boxing titles
Preceded by Paul Hodkinson	WBC featherweight champion April 28, 1993 – December 4, 1993	Succeeded by Kevin Kelley
