= Colin McNeil =

Scottish boxer

Personal information
- Nationality: British
- Born: Colin McNeil; 21 December 1972 (age 53) Fauldhouse, Scotland
- Weight: Light Middleweight

Boxing career
- Club: Fauldhouse ABC
- Stance: Southpaw

Boxing record
- Total fights: 14
- Wins: 11
- Win by KO: 3
- Losses: 3
- Draws: 0
- No contests: 0
Medal record
Representing Scotland
Commonwealth Games
Bronze medal – third place	1998 Kuala Lumpur	Welterweight

Colin McNeil (born 21 December 1972) is a former professional boxer. As an amateur he won a bronze medal at the Commonwealth Games.

== Biography ==
=== Amateur career ===
McNeil represented the Scottish team at the 1998 Commonwealth Games in Kuala Lumpur, Malaysia, where he competed in the welterweight. At the Games he won the bronze medal following victoriesy over Mosolesa Tsie of Lesotho and Thebe Setlalekgosi of Botswana before losing to Kenyan Absolom Okoth in the final.

He also competed in the 2002 Commonwealth Games.

=== Professional career ===
McNeil began boxing professionally late in his life, making his debuting during 2004 at the age of 32. He participated in The Contender Challenge: UK vs. USA, facing Cornelius Bundrage. He was also scheduled to face his Contender team-mate, Ross Minter in June 2007.
