= Deandre Latimore =

American boxer (born 1985)

Personal information
- Nickname: The Bull
- Born: August 31, 1985 (age 41) St. Louis, Missouri, U.S.
- Height: 5 ft 9 in (175 cm)
- Weight: Light middleweight

Boxing career
- Reach: 69 in (175 cm)
- Stance: Southpaw

Boxing record
- Total fights: 27
- Wins: 23
- Win by KO: 17
- Losses: 4

Deandre Latimore (born August 31, 1985) is an American former professional boxer who competed from 2006 to 2012, and challenged once for the IBF junior middleweight title in 2009.

== Early years and amateur career ==
Deandre began boxing at the age of eight at the 12th and Park Recreation Center on the south side of St. Louis. Born and raised in one of St. Louis most toughest housing projects he over came a lot of adversity and keep and clear head and followed his dream. As an amateur, Deandre was a 5-time St. Louis Golden Gloves Champion and he won several state, regional, and national championships. Because of his explosive style and track record for success, talent scouts and boxing enthusiasts from around the country began taking notice of Deandre's ability as a boxer. He made such a strong impression as an amateur that a professional career was inevitable. Deandre was signed by local boxing promoter Steven Smith and later signed with Mayweather Promotions.

== IBF World Title contention ==
In June 2008, Deandre faced and defeated the IBF #1 ranked contender Sechew Powell via 7th-round TKO, which set the stage for a showdown with hometown rival and former 2-division champion Cory Spinks. With only 20 professional fights under his belt, Deandre fought Spinks at the Scottrade Center Promoted By Rumble Time Promotions, Dibella Ent and Don King for the IBF light middleweight title and showed that he can compete with the world's best, losing a close and somewhat disputed decision, as one of the judges scored the bout in favor of Latimore. Prior to this fight Latimore Signed a second Co Promotion deal with Rumble Time Promotions adding Dibella Ent. He was managed by Jerry Gulliano. After losing the fight to Spinks, he was briefly managed and trained by local trainer/manager Jose Ponce. Latimore worked with Ponce/Seat Pound for Pound for two fights, winning one and losing the IBF eliminator against Sechew Powell. After the loss due to financial and things "not clicking" with Jose, Latimore terminated manager and training contract with Jose/Sweat Pound For Pound. Latimore was later managed by Chris Watkins and went back to Las Vegas, to train with Jeff Mayweather.

== Family life ==
Deandre is married to Shadonna Latimore and has five daughters, and currently resides in Henderson Nevada.

== Professional record ==
23 Wins (17 knockouts, 6 decisions), 4 Losses (2 knockouts, 2 decisions)
Res.	Record	Opponent	Type	Rd., Time	Date	Location	Notes
Loss	23–4	(Puerto Rico) Carlos Quintana	KO	6 (10), 2:19	2012-05-05	(United States) MGM Grand Garden Arena, Las Vegas, Nevada	For vacant WBO NABO Light Middleweight title.
Win	23-3	(Colombia) Milton Nunez	MD	10	2012-02-24	(United States) Hard Rock Hotel & Casino, Las Vegas, Nevada	
Win	22-3	(United States) Dennis Sharpe	UD	8	2011-04-16	(United States) Foxwoods Resort Casino, Mashantucket, Connecticut	
Win	21-3	(United States) Darien Ford	TKO	3 (10), 2:46	2010-07-24	(United States) The Pageant, St. Louis, Missouri	
Loss	20–3	(United States) Sechew Powell	MD	12	2010-03-19	(United States) Choctaw Casino Resort, Durant, Oklahoma	
Win	20–2	(United States) Sammy Sparkman	UD	10	2009-08-22	(United States) Hard Rock Hotel & Casino, Las Vegas, Nevada	
Loss	19–2	(United States) Cory Spinks	SD	12	2009-04-24	(United States) Scottrade Center, St. Louis, Missouri	For vacant IBF Light Middleweight title.
Win	19–1	(United States) Sechew Powell	TKO	7 (10), 2:11	2008-06-11	(United States) Hard Rock Cafe, New York, New York	
Win	18–1	(United States) Durrell Richardson	UD	10	2007-12-06	(United States) Ameristar Casino, St. Charles, Missouri	Won vacant WBC USNBC and WBF Intercontinental Light Middleweight titles.
Win	17–1	(United States) Ed Lee Humes	TKO	2 (8), 1:10	2007-12-06	(United States) Viking Hotel Grand Ballroom, St. Louis, Missouri	
Win	16–1	(United States) Mikel Williams	TKO	4 (8), 1:43	2007-08-03	(United States) Ameristar Casino, St. Charles, Missouri	
Win	15–1	(United States) Rodney Tatum	KO	3 (6), 0:25	2007-07-14	(United States) Scottrade Center, St. Louis, Missouri	
Win	14–1	(United States) Sean Rawley Wilson	TKO	2 (8), 1:15	2007-06-28	(United States) Ameristar Casino, St. Charles, Missouri	
Win	13–1	(United States) Brian Paul	KO	2 (12), 0:36	2007-05-11	(United States) Scottrade Center, St. Louis, Missouri	
Win	12–1	(United States) Damone Wright	UD	8	2007-04-18	(United States) Ameristar Casino, Kansas City, Missouri	
Loss	11–1	(Canada) Ian Gardner	KO	3 (8), 2:50	2007-01-25	(United States) Ameristar Casino, St. Charles, Missouri	
Win	11–0	(United States) Leo Laudat	TKO	1 (8), 1:38	2006-12-02	(United States) Ameristar Casino, St. Charles, Missouri	
Win	10–0	(United States) Rodney Freeman	KO	1 (8), 0:46	2006-09-21	(United States) Ameristar Casino, St. Charles, Missouri	
Win	9–0	(United States) Jessie Davis	TKO	6 (8), 1:53	2006-08-11	(United States) Hilton St. Louis Ballpark, St. Louis, Missouri	Won vacant USA Missouri State Light Middleweight title.
Win	8–0	(United States) Charles Walker	TKO	1 (4), 1:02	2006-06-22	(United States) Harrah's North Kansas City, Kansas City, Missouri	
Win	7–0	(United States) William Deets	UD	4	2006-06-01	(United States) Holiday Inn Southwest, St. Louis, Missouri	
Win	6–0	(United States) Reuben Rodriquez	TKO	1 (6), 2:27	2006-05-05	(United States) Family Arena, St. Charles, Missouri	
Win	5–0	(United States) Jonathan Bruce	TKO	1 (4), 0:44	2006-04-20	(United States) Capital Plaza Hotel, Jefferson City, Missouri	
Win	4–0	(United States) Wesley Martin	TKO	2 (4), 1:17	2006-03-31	(United States) Expo Center, Springfield, Missouri	
Win	3–0	(United States) David Bridges	TKO	1 (4), 0:32	2006-03-23	(United States) Heart of St. Charles Banquet Center, St. Charles, Missouri	
Win	2–0	(United States) Hosea Smith	KO	1 (4), 1:22	2006-03-09	(United States) The Spott, St. Louis, Missouri	
Win	1–0	(United States) Chris Mickle	TKO	1 (4), 0:33	2006-01-26	(United States) Family Arena, St. Charles, Missouri	
