= Ebo Elder =

American boxer (1978–2025)

Personal information
- Nationality: American
- Born: Ebo Elder; December 23, 1978 Newnan, Georgia, U.S.
- Died: December 1, 2025 (aged 46) Hogansville, Georgia, U.S.
- Weight: Welterweight; Light Welterweight; Lightweight

Boxing career
- Stance: Southpaw

Boxing record
- Total fights: 25
- Wins: 22
- Win by KO: 14
- Losses: 3
Medal record
Goodwill Games
Silver medal – second place	1998 New York	Light Welterweight

Ebo Elder (December 23, 1978 – December 1, 2025) was an American professional boxer. He was the WBO NABO Lightweight titleholder and also held the IBA Continental Light Welterweight title and WBO Inter-Continental Light Welterweight title. In January 2007, he left boxing to start Reality Ministries and began speaking at churches, colleges, public schools, youth detention centers and more.

== Professional boxing career ==
Ebo began boxing at the age of two when his father bought him a punching bag. He had a long amateur career with 139 wins before turning professional in 2000, amassing 16 wins before his first loss.

After a series of wins over mid-level opponents including Emmanuel Clottey, Elder took a significant step up in class with a convincing win over undefeated contender Oscar Diaz, winning by a score of 98–92 on all three scorecards. After a tune-up bout, Elder scored a near-shutout victory over 23–7 Fernando Trejo, launching him into a WBO NABO lightweight title match.

Elder won the WBO NABO lightweight title by 6th-round TKO over 17–3 Ricardo Fuentes, then defended it in a thrilling bout with 21–2 Courtney Burton. The scorecards were close after 11 rounds, before Elder dropped Burton twice in the twelfth, winning by TKO with 50 seconds left in the round. Shobox announcer Steve Farhood said of the Elder-Burton bout, "I don't think we've ever had a more physical, grueling, brutal fight."

The win over Burton would be Elder's last. In his last fight before joining the ESPN reality show, "Contender Season 2", he lost to former title holder Lakva Sim, this time as the recipient of a 12th-round TKO.

=== The Contender ===
On the ESPN reality show The Contender 2 series debut, Elder was chosen to be on the Gold Team. In the first bout of the tournament, Ebo lost to Michael Stewart by technical knockout 1 minute 52 seconds into the 4th round.

== Later life and death ==
Later a born-again Christian, Elder devoted his time away from the ring as a speaker, evangelist, Bible teacher and author. He died on December 1, 2025, at the age of 46. He had been diagnosed with glioblastoma, a form of brain cancer, in October 2024.

== Professional boxing record ==
25 fights	22 wins	3 losses
By knockout	14	3
By decision	8	0

No.	Result	Record	Opponent	Type	Round, time	Date	Location	Notes
25	Loss	22–3	Michael Stewart	TKO	4 (5), 1:52	Jan 27, 2006	Contender Gymnasium, Pasadena, California, US	The Contender (season 2)
24	Loss	22–2	Lakva Sim	TKO	12 (12), 0:44	Sep 16, 2005	Gwinnett Center, Duluth, Wisconsin, US	
23	Win	22–1	Courtney Burton	TKO	12 (12), 2:10	Dec 17, 2004	Chumash Casino, Santa Ynez, California, US	Retained WBO NABO lightweight title
22	Win	21–1	Ricardo Fuentes	TKO	6 (12)	Oct 9, 2004	Georgia Mountain Center, Gainesville, Florida, US	Won vacant WBO NABO lightweight title
21	Win	20–1	Fernando Trejo	UD	10	Jul 9, 2004	The Tabernacle, Atlanta, Georgia, US	
20	Win	19–1	William Rojas	TKO	4 (10), 2:29	Apr 23, 2004	Civic Center, Atlanta, Georgia, US	
19	Win	18–1	Oscar Díaz	UD	10	Mar 26, 2004	Miccosukee Indian Gaming Resort, Miami, Florida, US	
18	Win	17–1	Tyrone Wiggins	TKO	3 (4)	Jan 23, 2004	The Tabernacle, Atlanta, Georgia, US	
17	Loss	16–1	Ubaldo Hernandez	TKO	1 (12)	Nov 10, 2001	Civic Center, Savannah, Georgia, US	For vacant NABF super lightweight title
16	Win	16–0	Dagoberto Najera	TD	6 (12)	Sep 29, 2001	Emerald Queen Casino, Tacoma, Washington, US	Won vacant WBO Inter-Continental super lightweight title
15	Win	15–0	Jaime Morales	UD	12	Jul 28, 2001	Savannah, Georgia, US	Won vacant IBA Continental light welterweight title
14	Win	14–0	Emmanuel Clottey	UD	10	Jul 3, 2001	Six Flags Over Georgia, Atlanta, Georgia, US	
13	Win	13–0	Tyrone Ivory	TKO	6 (10), 1:48	May 11, 2001	Civic Center, Savannah, Georgia, US	
12	Win	12–0	Jerry Smith	RTD	6 (?)	Apr 12, 2001	Hyatt Regency Hotel, Atlanta, Georgia, US	
11	Win	11–0	Andre Baker	KO	8 (8)	Mar 24, 2001	Savannah, Georgia, US	
10	Win	10–0	Henry Cokes	KO	2 (6)	Feb 17, 2001	Savannah, Georgia, US	
9	Win	9–0	Leonti Vorontsuk	TKO	4 (4), 0:28)	Feb 10, 2001	Kingsway Leisure Centre, Widnes, Cheshire, England, UK	
8	Win	8–0	Luis Alberto Rosales	TKO	4 (6), 2:20)	Jan 25, 2001	Michael's Eighth Avenue, Glen Burnie, Maryland, US	
7	Win	7–0	Jamar Parker	TKO	1 (?)	Dec 29, 2000	Mountaineer Casino Racetrack and Resort, Chester, West Virginia, US	
6	Win	6–0	Todd Stringfellow	KO	1 (?)	Dec 16, 2000	Jarrell's Gym, Savannah, Georgia, US	
5	Win	5–0	Terry Dominic	UD	6	Oct 13, 2000	Atrium Arena, Stone Mountain, Georgia, US	
4	Win	4–0	Melvin Jones	UD	4	Sep 23, 2000	Casino Rama, Rama, Ontario, Canada	
3	Win	3–0	Roy Hughes	TKO	2 (4)	Sep 1, 2000	Ohkay Casino, San Juan Pueblo, New Mexico, US	
2	Win	2–0	Andre Baker	UD	4	Jul 21, 2000	Soaring Eagle Casino, Mount Pleasant, Michigan, US	
1	Win	1–0	Juan Thompson	TKO	1 (4), 1:39	Jun 10, 2000	Fox Theater, Detroit, Michigan, US	
