= Michael Stewart (boxer) =

American boxer

Personal information
- Nickname: No Joke
- Born: Michael Stewart; December 20, 1977 (age 48) Columbia, Tennessee, U.S.
- Height: 5 ft 8 in (173 cm)
- Weight: Welterweight

Boxing career
- Stance: Orthodox

Boxing record
- Total fights: 60
- Wins: 48
- Win by KO: 25
- Losses: 8
- Draws: 3
- No contests: 1

Michael Stewart (born December 20, 1977, Columbia, Tennessee) is a professional boxer. He has held the USBA light welterweight title. In perhaps his most high-profile bout, he was knocked out by Ricky Hatton in round 5. He also lost an IBF title fight by decision to Sharmba Mitchell.

Michael was a contestant on the reality series, Contender Season 2 on ESPN. On it, he was picked to be a member of the Blue Team. In the first round, he fought Ebo Elder, winning by knockout, but Grady Brewer beat him by unanimous decision in the semifinals winning 50-45 on all scorecards.
