= Cornelius Bundrage =

American boxer

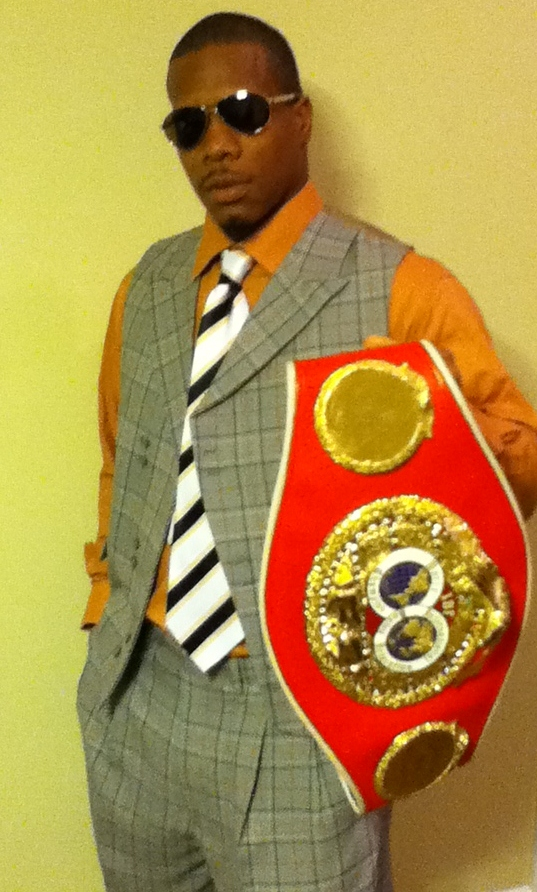

Personal information
- Nickname: K9
- Born: Cornelius Bundrage; April 25, 1973 (age 53) Detroit, Michigan, U.S.
- Height: 5 ft 6 in (168 cm)
- Weight: Light middleweight

Boxing career
- Reach: 72 in (183 cm)
- Stance: Orthodox

Boxing record
- Total fights: 44
- Wins: 37
- Win by KO: 21
- Losses: 6
- No contests: 1

Cornelius Bundrage (born April 25, 1973) is an American professional boxer. He is a two-time former world champion, having held the IBF junior middleweight title twice between 2010 and 2015. In 2006 he was a contestant on season two of the Contender reality TV show, where he reached the semi-finals.

== Professional career ==
Starting out in boxing, Bundrage was a top prospect, remaining undefeated for ten years, which saw his record at (21-0, 13 KOs). As his alias K9 suggests, Bundrage had a reputation of being a dog inside the ring, damaging his opponents with fierce combinations. Cornelius' professional boxing record stands at (32-4, 19 KO's). Bundrage has shared the ring with 7 former world champions during his professional boxing career. Bundrage is currently a world champion boxing free-agent. His advisor is Bill Waller, and managed by Shawana Bundrage.

=== The Contender ===
In 2006, professional boxer Cornelius 'K9' Bundrage was a participant on ESPN's "The Contender" Season 2 boxing reality television show, with Hall of fame host Sugar Ray Leonard and Sylvester Stallone in Hollywood, California. During the show, Bundrage was viewed by millions of fans each week for fourteen weeks straight. He also was named "fan favorite" out of sixteen boxers from all over the United States. Bundrage was the last picked, winding up on the Blue Team. Wanting to avenge the slight, he volunteered to be the first member of his team to box in the tournament (quoting Matthew 20:16, "And the last shall be first") and found himself in a match against Michael Clark. In a tightly fought battle for five rounds, the two found themselves practically tied on points, Bundrage knocked Clark down with a massive right hand to the temple, which won him the fifth round on 2 of the 3 judge's scorecards and won a majority decision (2 judges said Bundrage won, 1 said it was a draw). Bundrage moved along in the tournament, while Clark was forced to hang up his gloves and go home.

In the quarterfinal round, Bundrage beat Walter Wright via unanimous decision.

Bundrage's strength failed him by losing too much weight leading up to the fight, when he faced Steve Forbes in the semifinals; Forbes won a unanimous decision over Bundrage, with the fans booing Bundrage because of intentional punches at the back of Forbes head.

Bundrage bounced back, then went on to win The Contender bronze medal fight against Norberto Bravo with a devastating TKO in the seventh round in very impressive fashion.

=== Career after The Contender ===
On the January 12, 2007, edition of ESPN's Friday Night Fights at the Emerald Queen Casino in Tacoma, Washington, Bundrage faced former top welterweight prospect Chris Smith. In an extremely close fight, Bundrage was able to survive a sixth round scare and would come back to hurt Smith with a left hook to the jaw in the final seconds of the last round. Bundrage defeated Smith via split decision.

On March 30, 2007, he fought in The Contender Challenge: UK vs. USA broadcast on ESPN. He won the fight with a 7th round knockout against Colin McNeil, assuring the American team a victory in The Contender Challenge: UK vs. USA. Bundrage showed superiority throughout the fight. The fight took place in Metro Radio Arena, Newcastle, England.

On July 11, 2007, "Wednesday Night Fights," K9 fought Joel Julio, a hard-hitting 22-year-old junior middleweight contender who at the time was rated top 3 in all major sanctioning bodies. The fight was held after the ESPY awards at Kodak Theatre. Bundrage took the opportunity on 3 weeks notice and lost a dangerous 37 pounds in a 3-week span. K9 gave all he had, which was not much and lasted 8 rounds off pure heart. At the 2:28 mark of the 8th, Julio caught Bundrage with a long clean right hand. Julio jumped on Bundrage, which caused the referee to call a halt to the fight.

On March 28, 2008, Bundrage would rebound with a career best win. Bundrage defeated former IBF Light Middleweight Champion Kassim Ouma by unanimous decision in Salamanca, NY. Bundrage survived an early cut to win by scores of 96-93, 96-93 and 95-94.

On November 13, 2008, Bundrage would face the respected journeyman fighter Grady Brewer. Bundrage lost the bout via controversial split decision that not only did many think he deserved, but led on punch-stats via a margin that was unexpected.

Then just a month later on December 13, 2008, Bundrage flew thousands of miles to Germany on 2 weeks notice to later upset previously unbeaten prospect European Champion Zaurbek Baysangurov via 5th round KO in an IBF eliminator for the #2 mandatory spot.

On June 27, 2009, Bundrage then fought in another IBF Title Elminiator against Yuri Foreman, which ended in a 'No Decision'. Bundrage accidentally headbutted Foreman in the third round and the ring physician ended the fight.

=== IBF junior middleweight champion ===
After four separate setback losses, two IBF eliminators and a no contest, Cornelius Bundrage finally got his questionable title fight with former Undisputed Welterweight Champion and then current IBF Light Middleweight Champion Cory Spinks on August 7, 2010 at the Scottrade Center, Saint Louis, Missouri, United States. Cornelius traveled to his opponent's home town and scored an impressive 5th round knockout over Spinks. Besides capturing his dream of becoming a world champion, Bundrage also brought a major championship back to his hometown of Detroit, Michigan. There hadn't been a Detroit world champion in 26 years since Thomas Hearns. Bundrage was able to pressure Spinks throughout the fight cutting off the ring, landing good shots and not letting Spinks get into his rhythm of jab and move, Spinks was able to perry the jab of Bundrage occasionally but couldn't capitalize. Midway through the fifth a perfect 1-2 combo landed on the chin of Spinks backing him up to the ropes, Bundrage followed up with two straight rights to the head that knocked Spinks down and into a daze, Spinks got to his feet but after taking too many good shots and with so much time left in the round, the referee Mark Nelson waved of the fight at 1:25 of the round, declaring Bundrage the new IBF Light Middleweight Champion.

=== First title defense ===
He made the first defense of his IBF title in a rematch against Sechew "Iron Horse" Powell on June 25, 2011 in Saint Charles, Missouri. Powell stopped Bundrage 5 years earlier in a wild rare double knockdown which ended in one round. In the rematch, K9 made a statement by winning a 12 round onesided victory, which avenged his defeat, winning by unanimous decision over Powell. The scores read 119-109, 115-113 and 117-111.

=== Rematch with Spinks ===
On June 30, 2012, K9 rematched Cory Spinks to defend his title for the second time in San Jose California on SHOBOX: the new generation. After knocking Spinks down in round 1, the fight began to even up until K9 dropped Spinks three times in the 7th round en route to a TKO victory. He then expressed his interest and desire to face fellow world champion, WBC Light Middleweight Champion Saul Alvarez.

=== Losing the title ===
In his third defense of the IBF title, Bundrage would lose the title to Ishe Smith via majority decision on February 23, 2013. He was docked a point in the second round for hitting Smith while Smith was on the canvas after a push/slip between the two fighters. The scores read 111-116, 114-114 and 111-116.

=== Return to title contention ===
Bundrage got back into the winning column, defeating Miami's own Joey Hernandez 23-1 (KO 13), by unanimous decision for the IBF Eliminator #1 position on January 24, 2014 in Indio California at the Fantasy Springs Resort Casino. Scores read 118-110 by all three judges. With the victory Bundrage landed himself another crack at the belt he lost just last year.

=== Second IBF junior middleweight title ===
On October 11, 2014, Cornelius Bundrage would face off against IBF Light Middleweight champion Carlos Molina. Despite tiring early, Bundrage dominated Molina, dropping him twice and hurtIng him repeatedly throughout the match. Bundrage would win the title via unanimous decision.

== Professional boxing record ==
44 fights	37 wins	6 losses
By knockout	21	3
By decision	16	3
No contests	1	

No.	Result	Record	Opponent	Type	Round, time	Date	Age	Location	Notes
44	Win	37–6 (1)	Antoine Elerson	TKO	4 (6), 2:59	Nov 7, 2020	47 years, 196 days	Elks Lodge, Bonita Springs, Florida, U.S.	
43	Win	36–6 (1)	Juan Carlos Rojas	UD	6	Jun 25, 2017	44 years, 61 days	Ford Community & Performing Arts Center, Dearborn, Michigan, U.S.	
42	Win	35–6 (1)	Sergio Gomez	KO	2 (6), 2:06	Jan 7, 2017	43 years, 257 days	Ford Community & Performing Arts Center, Dearborn, Michigan, U.S.	
41	Loss	34–6 (1)	Jermall Charlo	KO	3 (12), 2:33	Sep 12, 2015	42 years, 140 days	Foxwoods Resort Casino, Ledyard, Connecticut, U.S.	Lost IBF light middleweight title
40	Win	34–5 (1)	Carlos Molina	UD	12	Oct 11, 2014	41 years, 169 days	Grand Oasis Hotel, Cancún, Mexico	Won IBF light middleweight title
39	Win	33–5 (1)	Joey Hernandez	UD	12	Jan 24, 2014	40 years, 274 days	Fantasy Springs Resort Casino, Indio, California, U.S.	
38	Loss	32–5 (1)	Ishe Smith	MD	12	Feb 23, 2013	39 years, 304 days	Masonic Temple, Detroit, Michigan, U.S.	Lost IBF light middleweight title
37	Win	32–4 (1)	Cory Spinks	TKO	7 (12), 2:32	Jun 30, 2012	39 years, 64 days	Fantasy Springs Resort Casino, Indio, California, U.S.	Retained IBF light middleweight title
36	Win	31–4 (1)	Sechew Powell	UD	12	Jun 25, 2011	38 years, 61 days	Family Arena, St. Louis, Missouri, U.S.	Retained IBF light middleweight title
35	Win	30–4 (1)	Cory Spinks	TKO	5 (12), 1:28	Aug 7, 2010	37 years, 104 days	Scottrade Center, St. Louis, Missouri, U.S.	Won IBF light middleweight title
34	NC	29–4 (1)	Yuri Foreman	NC	3 (12)	Jun 27, 2009	36 years, 63 days	Boardwalk Hall, Atlantic City, New Jersey, U.S.	NC after Foreman was cut from an accidental head clash
33	Win	29–4	Zaurbek Baysangurov	TKO	5 (12), 2:35	Dec 13, 2008	35 years, 232 days	SAP Arena, Mannheim, Germany	
32	Loss	28–4	Grady Brewer	SD	10	Nov 13, 2008	35 years, 202 days	Dunkin' Donuts Center, Providence, Rhode Island, U.S.	
31	Win	28–3	Kassim Ouma	UD	10	Mar 28, 2008	34 years, 338 days	Seneca Allegany Resort & Casino, Salamanca, New York, U.S.	
30	Win	27–3	Nelson Manchego	TKO	5 (10), 0:39	Oct 26, 2007	34 years, 184 days	Convocation Center, Ypsilanti, Michigan, U.S.	
29	Loss	26–3	Joel Julio	TKO	8 (10), 1:08	Jul 11, 2007	34 years, 77 days	Kodak Theatre, Los Angeles, California, U.S.	
28	Win	26–2	Colin McNeil	TKO	7 (8), 0:40	Mar 30, 2007	33 years, 339 days	Metro Radio Arena, Newcastle, England	
27	Win	25–2	Chris Smith	SD	10	Jan 12, 2007	33 years, 262 days	Emerald Queen Casino, Tacoma, Washington, U.S.	
26	Win	24–2	Norberto Bravo	TKO	7 (8), 2:22	Sep 26, 2006	33 years, 154 days	Staples Center, Los Angeles, California, U.S.	
25	Loss	23–2	Steve Forbes	UD	5	Feb 10, 2006	32 years, 291 days	Contender Gymnasium, Pasadena, California, U.S.	The Contender 2: semi-final
24	Win	23–1	Walter Wright	UD	5	Feb 3, 2006	32 years, 284 days	Contender Gymnasium, Pasadena, California, U.S.	The Contender 2: quarter-final
23	Win	22–1	Michael Clark	MD	5	Jan 17, 2006	32 years, 267 days	Contender Gymnasium, Pasadena, California, U.S.	The Contender 2: preliminary round
22	Loss	21–1	Sechew Powell	TKO	1 (10), 0:22	May 6, 2005	32 years, 11 days	Foxwoods Resort Casino, Ledyard, Connecticut, U.S.	
21	Win	21–0	Jonathan Corn	TKO	2 (10), 1:27	Feb 18, 2005	31 years, 299 days	Michigan State Fairgrounds Coliseum, Detroit, Michigan, U.S.	Won vacant UBA Intercontinental light middleweight title
20	Win	20–0	Damien Guerra	TKO	2 (10), 1:34	Nov 19, 2004	31 years, 208 days	State Fairgrounds Coliseum, Detroit, Michigan, U.S.	
19	Win	19–0	Michael Davis	TKO	9 (10)	Sep 25, 2004	31 years, 153 days	Cobo Hall, Detroit, Michigan, U.S.	
18	Win	18–0	William Harmon	KO	1 (10)	Aug 28, 2004	31 years, 125 days	Cobo Hall, Detroit, Michigan, U.S.	
17	Win	17–0	Kirk Douglas	TKO	2 (10), 1:18	Jul 17, 2004	31 years, 83 days	Cobo Arena, Detroit, Michigan, U.S.	
16	Win	16–0	Eloy Suarez	UD	8	May 29, 2004	31 years, 34 days	Joe Louis Arena, Detroit, Michigan, U.S.	
15	Win	15–0	John Hammond	KO	1 (6), 0:45	Apr 2, 2004	30 years, 343 days	Joe Louis Arena, Detroit, Michigan, U.S.	
14	Win	14–0	Anthony Bowman	RTD	6 (8), 3:00	Oct 1, 2002	29 years, 159 days	Dodge Theatre, Phoenix, Arizona, U.S.	
13	Win	13–0	Scott Robinson	TKO	1 (4)	Jul 5, 2002	29 years, 71 days	Menominee Casino-Bingo Hotel, Keshena, Wisconsin, U.S.	
12	Win	12–0	Anthony Bowman	UD	4	Jun 8, 2002	29 years, 44 days	The Pyramid, Memphis, Tennessee, U.S.	
11	Win	11–0	Arsen Aivazyan	UD	6	Oct 13, 2000	27 years, 171 days	Club International, Detroit, Michigan, U.S.	
10	Win	10–0	Sammy Sparkman	SD	8	Jul 29, 2000	27 years, 95 days	Atheneum Suite Hotel, Detroit, Michigan, U.S.	
9	Win	9–0	Tony Ault	KO	1	Feb 4, 2000	26 years, 285 days	Canton, Michigan, U.S.	
8	Win	8–0	Lawrence Brooks	SD	4	Dec 10, 1999	26 years, 229 days	Cobo Center Ballroom, Detroit, Michigan, U.S.	
7	Win	7–0	Dewayne Holland	TKO	1 (4), 2:26	Nov 20, 1999	26 years, 209 days	Canton, Michigan, U.S.	
6	Win	6–0	Charles Howe	SD	6	Aug 6, 1999	26 years, 103 days	State Fair, Columbus, Ohio, U.S.	
5	Win	5–0	Guy Packer	TKO	3 (6), 2:20	Jul 16, 1999	26 years, 82 days	Twin Lakes Golf Club, Oakland, Michigan, U.S.	
4	Win	4–0	Chris Haentjiens	PTS	4	Dec 12, 1998	25 years, 231 days	Detroit, Michigan, U.S.	
3	Win	3–0	Leon Finchem	TKO	2	Nov 14, 1998	25 years, 203 days	Detroit, Michigan, U.S.	
2	Win	2–0	Ron Krull	KO	2	Feb 2, 1996	22 years, 283 days	Detroit, Michigan, U.S.	
1	Win	1–0	Shawn Purdy	UD	4	Sep 15, 1995	22 years, 143 days	Detroit, Michigan, U.S.	

Sporting positions
World boxing titles
Preceded by Cory Spinks	IBF junior middleweight champion August 7, 2010 – February 23, 2013	Succeeded by Ishe Smith
Preceded by Carlos Molina	IBF junior middleweight champion October 11, 2014 – September 12, 2015	Succeeded by Jermall Charlo
Records
Previous: Verno Phillips	Oldest junior middleweight world champion 38 years, 11 months April 16, 2012 – present	Incumbent
