= Andre Eason =

American boxer

Andre Eason
Profile
Nickname	Daredevil
Born	December 19, 1975
Nationality	(United States) American
Residence	New York City, U.S.
Classification	Welterweight
Boxing Record
Fights	20
Wins (KOs)	15(6)
Losses	5
Draws	0
No Contest	0
Results on Contender Season 2
First Round	Lost to Walter Wright

Andre Eason (born December 19, 1975, in Brooklyn, New York) is a professional boxer. He appeared on the reality show, Contender Season 2, where he lost to Walter Wright.

Prior to appearing on The Contender, Eason, known as "Daredevil", had come up short in each of his high-profile opportunities; losses to Juan Urango, Francisco Bojado, and Demetrius Hopkins.
