= Norberto Bravo =

American boxer

Personal information
- Nickname: El Gallito (The Fighting Rooster)
- Born: December 4, 1970 (age 55) Tucson, Arizona, U.S.
- Weight: Middleweight; Light Middleweight; Welterweight

Boxing career
- Stance: Orthodox

Boxing record
- Total fights: 48
- Wins: 27
- Win by KO: 15
- Losses: 18
- Draws: 2
- No contests: 1

Norberto Bravo (born December 4, 1970) is an American professional boxer, and is a contestant on the ESPN reality show Contender Season 2.

== Early life ==
Bravo was born in Tucson, Arizona.

== Professional career ==
In the amateur ranks, Bravo posted 120 wins in 130 fights. He became a professional at age 20, and once fought Ishe Smith, a contestant on the first Contender, losing a unanimous decision in 6 rounds at the Orleans Hotel and Casino. His one no-decision came about as both he and the other boxer continued to fight after the closing bell in a 4-round bout.

=== The Contender ===
On the show Contender Season 2, Bravo was a member of the Blue Team. He fought in the second contest of the first round, choosing to face Rudy Cisneros due to Cisneros' problems making weight for the upcoming bout. Bravo won a split decision, with judge Max DeLuca scoring 49-46 Bravo, judge Lou Moret scoring 48-47 Cisneros, and judge Fritz Warner scoring 49-46 Bravo.

In the last fight of the second round, Bravo defeated Gary Balletto by unanimous decision. Bravo lost to Grady Brewer in the semifinals, despite knocking Brewer down in the first round. In the bronze medal fight against Cornelius Bundrage, Norberto lost by TKO in the seventh round.

He then went on to a 1st-round TKO defeat to Andre Berto.

== Professional boxing record ==
48 fights	27 wins	18 losses
By knockout	15	5
By decision	12	13
Draws	2	
No contests	1	

No.	Result	Record	Opponent	Type	Round, time	Date	Location	Notes
48	Loss	27–18–2 (1)	(Poland) Paweł Wolak	TKO	3 (8), 1:35	Feb 21, 2009	(United States) Madison Square Garden, New York City, New York, USA	
47	Win	27–17–2 (1)	(Mexico) Jose Luis Cruz	MD	6	2008-11-07	(United States) Casino Del Sol, Tucson, Arizona, USA	
46	Win	26–17–2 (1)	(Mexico) Roberto Valenzuela	RTD	3 (6), 3:00	2008-07-18	(United States) Casino Del Sol, Tucson, Arizona, USA	
45	Loss	25–17–2 (1)	(Mexico) Freddy Hernández	UD	12	2008-04-18	(United States) Casino Del Sol, Tucson, Arizona, USA	For vacant IBA Welterweight title.
44	Loss	25–16–2 (1)	(Mexico) Enrique Ornelas	RTD	7 (12), 3:00	2008-02-22	(United States) Morongo Casino Resort & Spa, Cabazon, California, USA	For NABF Middleweight title.
43	Win	25–15–2 (1)	(Mexico) Julio Perez	KO	1 (8), 2:30	2007-10-11	(United States) AVA Casino Del Sol, Tucson, Arizona, USA	
42	Loss	24–15–2 (1)	(Mexico) Yori Boy Campas	UD	10	2007-08-31	(United States) Casino Del Sol, Tucson, Arizona, USA	For vacant IBA Americas Super welterweight title.
41	Win	24–14–2 (1)	(United States) Jaime Javier Barahona	TKO	3 (8), 2:47	2007-06-21	(United States) AVA Casino Del Sol, Tucson, Arizona, USA	
40	Loss	23–14–2 (1)	(United States) Andre Berto	TKO	1 (10), 2:28	2007-02-17	(United States) Hammerstein Ballroom, New York City, New York, USA	
39	Win	23–13–2 (1)	(United States) Michael Lucero	UD	8	2006-12-08	(United States) Desert Diamond Casino, Tucson, Arizona, USA	
38	Loss	22–13–2 (1)	(United States) Cornelius Bundrage	TKO	7 (8), 2:22	2006-09-26	(United States) Staples Center, Los Angeles, California, USA	
37	Loss	22–12–2 (1)	(United States) Grady Brewer	MD	5	2006-02-10	(United States) Contender Gymnasium, Pasadena, California, USA	
36	Win	22–11–2 (1)	(United States) Gary Balletto	UD	5	2006-02-06	(United States) Contender Gymnasium, Pasadena, California, USA	
35	Win	21–11–2 (1)	(United States) Rudy Cisneros	SD	5	2006-01-19	(United States) Contender Gymnasium, Pasadena, California, USA	
34	Loss	20–11–2 (1)	(Ghana) Ben Tackie	MD	10	2005-09-23	(United States) USC Lyon Center, Los Angeles, California, USA	
33	Loss	20–10–2 (1)	(Mexico) Ernesto Zepeda	SD	12	2005-07-30	(United States) Desert Diamond Casino, Tucson, Arizona, USA	For IBA Continental Americas Light welterweight title.
32	Loss	20–9–2 (1)	(United States) Demetrius Hopkins	UD	10	2005-03-25	(United States) Desert Diamond Casino, Tucson, Arizona, USA	
31	NC	20–8–2 (1)	(Mexico) Victor Manuel Mendoza	NC	4	2005-01-06	(United States) Desert Diamond Casino, Tucson, Arizona, USA	Both fighters were disqualified due to fighting after the final bell, resulting in a NC.
30	Win	20–8–2	(United States) Jesus Abel Santiago	UD	10	2004-11-19	(United States) Desert Diamond Casino, Tucson, Arizona, USA	
29	Win	19–8–2	(Mexico) Gustavo Corral	MD	10	2004-08-08	(United States) Desert Diamond Casino, Tucson, Arizona, USA	
28	Draw	18–8–2	(Mexico) Omar Bernal	SD	8	2004-06-04	(United States) Plaza Hotel & Casino, Las Vegas, Nevada, USA	Bravo deducted a point for hitting Bernal after knocking him down in the 5th round.
27	Win	18–8–1	(United States) Bradley Jensen	TKO, 1:27	2 (8)	2004-05-14	(United States) Dodge Theater, Phoenix, Arizona, USA	
26	Win	17–8–1	(Mexico) Victor Manuel Mendoza	UD	6	2004-04-02	(United States) Desert Diamond Casino, Tucson, Arizona, USA	
25	Win	16–8–1	(United States) Anthony Simpkins	TKO	1 (4), 2:03	2004-02-06	(United States) Desert Diamond Casino, Tucson, Arizona, USA	
24	Win	15–8–1	(Mexico) Julian Romero	UD	6	2003-10-10	(United States) Desert Diamond Casino, Tucson, Arizona, USA	
23	Win	14–8–1	(United States) Sergio Joel De la Torre	UD	8	2003-08-01	(United States) Orleans Hotel & Casino, Las Vegas, Nevada, USA	
22	Win	13–8–1	(United States) Frankie Sanchez	UD	8	2003-06-13	(United States) Thunderbird Casino, Norman, Oklahoma, USA	
21	Win	12–8–1	(Philippines) Gerry Balagbagan	TKO	7 (8), 3:00	2003-04-04	(United States) Colorado Belle, Laughlin, Nevada, USA	
20	Loss	11–8–1	(United States) José Celaya	UD	8	2003-02-08	(United States) Mandalay Bay Resort & Casino, Las Vegas, Nevada, USA	
19	Loss	11–7–1	(Brazil) Jose Luis Rodrigues	UD	6	2002-06-14	(United States) Orleans Hotel & Casino, Las Vegas, Nevada, USA	
18	Loss	11–6–1	(United States) Ramon Olivas	UD	8	2002-04-05	(United States) Celebrity Theater, Phoenix, Arizona, USA	
17	Win	11–5–1	(United States) Jonathan Nelson	TKO	4 (6), 1:41	2002-02-22	(United States) Orleans Hotel & Casino, Las Vegas, Nevada, USA	
16	Loss	10–5–1	(United States) Ishe Smith	UD	6	2001-12-28	(United States) Orleans Hotel & Casino, Las Vegas, Nevada, USA	
15	Loss	10–4–1	(United States) Joseph Brady	UD	8	2001-12-14	(United States) Sky City Casino, Acoma, New Mexico, USA	
14	Loss	10–3–1	(Canada) Ian MacKillop	UD	6	2001-09-29	(United States) Emerald Queen Casino, Tacoma, Washington, USA	
13	Win	10–2–1	(Ghana) Awel Abdulai	UD	8	2001-08-19	(United States) New West Night Club, Tucson, Arizona, USA	
12	Win	9–2–1	(United States) Danny Laborin	UD	4	2001-04-27	(United States) Pechanga Resort & Casino, Temecula, California, USA	
11	Loss	8–2–1	(United States) Jose Antonio Ocampo	KO	1 (4)	1992-11-09	(United States) Great Western Forum, Inglewood, California, USA	
10	Win	8–1–1	(United States) Jose Michalean	KO	1 (4)	1992-07-19	(United States) Tucson, Arizona, USA	
9	Win	7–1–1	(United States) Cesar Castillo	KO	2 (4)	1992-07-07	(United States) Wyndham paradise Valley Resort, Phoenix, Arizona, USA	
8	Win	6–1–1	(United States) Louis Saucedo	TKO	4 (4)	1992-06-26	(United States) Phoenix, Arizona, USA	
7	Win	5–1–1	(United States) Armando Pimentel	TKO	4 (4), 2:57	1992-04-09	(United States) Wyndham Resort, Scottsdale, Arizona, USA	
6	Win	4–1–1	(Cuba) Prendice Rodriguez	TKO	3 (4)	1992-02-21	(United States) Pinal County Fairgrounds, Casa Grande, Arizona, USA	
5	Loss	3–1–1	(United States) Frank Peña	SD	4	1991-12-19	(United States) Hacienda Hotel and Casino, Boulder City, Nevada, USA	
4	Win	3–0–1	(Mexico) Martin Navarrete	TKO	2 (4)	1991-11-06	(United States) Convention Center, Tucson, Arizona, USA	
3	Draw	2–0–1	(Mexico) Ramon Sanchez	SD	4	1991-09-13	(United States) Union Plaza Casino, Las Vegas, Nevada, USA	
2	Win	2–0	(Uganda) Justin Juuko	TKO	2 (4), 2:03	1991-07-06	(United States) Union Plaza Casino, Las Vegas, Nevada, USA	
1	Win	1–0	(United States) Chris Crespin	TKO	2 (4), 1:32	1991-05-08	(United States) Riverside Resort & Casino, Laughlin, Nevada, USA	Professional debut

== Personal life ==
Bravo is colorblind. He currently lives in Tucson, is engaged with four children, and works in construction in addition to boxing.
