= Mike Anchondo =

American boxer (born 1982)

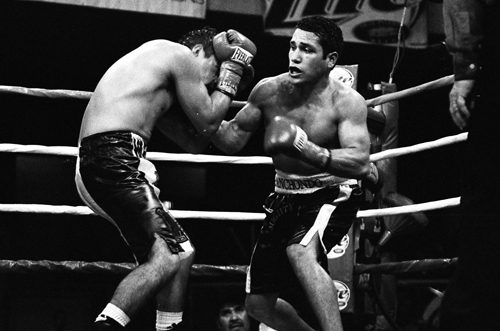
- Anchondo (right) vs. Gregorio Vargas, 2003

Personal information
- Nickname: Mighty Mike
- Born: Michael Alfred Anchondo; April 15, 1982 (age 44) Los Angeles, California, U.S.
- Height: 5 ft 7 in (170 cm)
- Weight: Super featherweight

Boxing career
- Reach: 66 in (168 cm)
- Stance: Orthodox

Boxing record
- Total fights: 33
- Wins: 30
- Win by KO: 19
- Losses: 3

Michael Alfred Anchondo (born April 15, 1982) is an American former professional boxer who held the WBO Super featherweight title.

== Professional career ==
Anchondo signed turned pro in 2000 at the age of 18 and won his first 24 fights most of which were fought in southern california. His 25th fight was for the vacant WBO super featherweight title in 2004 in which he faced Pablo Chacón in Miami. He comfortably outpointed Chacón over 12 rounds and knocked Chacon down in the final round with two minutes remaining. It was a short reign, as he was stripped of the title for being nearly being 5 lbs. overweight during the weigh-in, his opponent Jorge Rodrigo Barrios ended up winning via 4th round stoppage in a bout that was televised by ESPN Friday Night Fights. In 2007, he was upset by former amateur standout Darling Jimenez, dashing any imminent title hopes. He retired from fighting in 2010 at the relatively young age of 28.

== Professional boxing record ==
| 33 fights | 30 wins | 3 losses |
|---|---|---|
| By knockout | 19 | 3 |
| By decision | 11 | 0 |

| No. | Result | Record | Opponent | Type | Round, time | Date | Location | Notes |
|---|---|---|---|---|---|---|---|---|
| 33 | Loss | 30–3 | Freddy Hernández | TKO | 4 (10) | 2010-09-17 | Buffalo Bill's Star Arena, Primm, Nevada, U.S. | |
| 32 | Win | 30–2 | Mauricio Herrera | SD | 8 (8) | 2009-12-04 | Chumash Casino Resort, Santa Ynez, California, U.S. | |
| 31 | Win | 29–2 | Octavio Narvaez | MD | 6 (6) | 2009-07-30 | Expo Center, El Monte, California, U.S. | |
| 30 | Win | 28–2 | Hector Alatorre | UD | 6 (6) | 2009-04-16 | San Manuel Casino, Highland, California, U.S. | |
| 29 | Loss | 27–2 | Darling Jimenez | KO | 3 (10) | 2007-04-27 | D.C. Armory, Washington, D.C., U.S. | |
| 28 | Win | 27–1 | Armando Cordoba | UD | 8 (8) | 2006-12-14 | Marriott Hotel, Irvine, California, U.S. | |
| 27 | Win | 26–1 | Antonio Ramirez | TKO | 9 (10) | 2005-12-09 | Paradise Theater, New York City, New York, U.S. | |
| 26 | Loss | 25–1 | Jorge Rodrigo Barrios | TKO | 4 (12) | 2005-04-08 | Miccosukee Resort & Gaming, Miami, Florida, U.S. | Lost WBO super-featherweight title |
| 25 | Win | 25–0 | Pablo Chacón | UD | 12 (12) | 2004-07-15 | American Airlines Center, Dallas, Texas, U.S. | Won vacant WBO super-featherweight title |
| 24 | Win | 24–0 | José Luis Soto Karass | TD | 5 (10) | 2004-04-29 | Laredo Energy Arena, Laredo, Texas, U.S. | |
| 23 | Win | 23–0 | Gregorio Vargas | UD | 10 (10) | 2003-12-11 | Olympic Auditorium, Los Angeles, California, U.S. | |
| 22 | Win | 22–0 | Silverio Ortiz | RTD | 4 (10) | 2003-09-18 | Santa Ana Stadium, Santa Ana, California, U.S. | Retained WBC Youth super-featherweight title |
| 21 | Win | 21–0 | Roque Cassiani | TKO | 10 (10) | 2003-04-17 | Olympic Auditorium, Los Angeles, California, U.S. | |
| 20 | Win | 20–0 | Angel Rios | UD | 10 (10) | 2003-01-16 | Olympic Auditorium, Los Angeles, California, U.S. | Won WBC Youth super-featherweight title |
| 19 | Win | 19–0 | Isidro Tejedor | TKO | 2 (10) | 2003-01-16 | SAP Center, San Jose, California, U.S. | |
| 18 | Win | 18–0 | Ever Beleno | UD | 10 (10) | 2002-08-17 | Soboba Casino, San Jacinto, California, U.S. | |
| 17 | Win | 17–0 | Manuel Bocanegra | TKO | 3 (8) | 2002-05-23 | Compaq Center, San Jose, California, U.S. | |
| 16 | Win | 16–0 | Alejandro Ramirez | TKO | 4 (8) | 2001-12-15 | Soboba Casino, San Jacinto, California, U.S. | |
| 15 | Win | 15–0 | Alejandro Ramirez | UD | 6 (6) | 2001-11-18 | Soboba Casino, San Jacinto, California, U.S. | |
| 14 | Win | 14–0 | Juan Carlos Garcia | TKO | 1 (6) | 2001-10-14 | Soboba Casino, San Jacinto, California, U.S. | |
| 13 | Win | 13–0 | Juan Carlos Martinez | TKO | 1 (4) | 2001-07-15 | Soboba Casino, San Jacinto, California, U.S. | |
| 12 | Win | 12–0 | Roberto Romero | KO | 1 (6) | 2001-06-03 | Soboba Casino, San Jacinto, California, U.S. | |
| 11 | Win | 11–0 | Juan Carlos Aranday | UD | 7 (7) | 2001-04-26 | Marriott Hotel, Irvine, California, U.S. | |
| 10 | Win | 10–0 | Luis Enrique Valenzuela | TKO | 3 (6) | 2001-02-18 | El Centro, California, U.S. | |
| 9 | Win | 9–0 | Osvaldo Valenzuela | KO | 2 (6) | 2001-01-18 | Honda Center, Anaheim, California, U.S. | |
| 8 | Win | 8–0 | Martin Llamas | TKO | 3 (6) | 2000-12-18 | Los Angeles, California, U.S. | |
| 7 | Win | 7–0 | Arturo Flores | KO | 1 (4) | 2000-11-16 | Marriott Hotel, Irvine, California, U.S. | |
| 6 | Win | 6–0 | Luis Antonio Martinez | TKO | 3 (6) | 2000-10-27 | Quiet Cannon, Montebello, California, U.S. | |
| 5 | Win | 5–0 | Juan Roberto Colin | KO | 2 (4) | 2000-09-21 | Marriott Hotel, Irvine, California, U.S. | |
| 4 | Win | 4–0 | Victor Manuel Barreto | KO | 2 (4) | 2000-08-27 | Del Mar racetrack, Del Mar, California, U.S. | |
| 3 | Win | 3–0 | Ramon Acuna | KO | 1 (4) | 2000-08-04 | Quiet Cannon, Montebello, California, U.S. | |
| 2 | Win | 2–0 | Victor Guerrero | KO | 3 (4) | 2000-06-22 | Arrowhead Pond, Anaheim, California, U.S. | |
| 1 | Win | 1–0 | Ramon Ortiz | KO | 4 (4) | 2000-05-06 | Fantasy Springs Resort Casino, Indio, California, U.S. | |

== See also ==
- List of world super-featherweight boxing champions

Sporting positions
Regional boxing titles
| Vacant Title last held by Humberto Soto | WBC Youth super-featherweight champion January 16, 2003 – July 15, 2004; Won world title | Vacant Title next held by Josesito López |
World boxing titles
| Vacant Title last held by Diego Corrales | WBO super-featherweight champion July 15, 2004 – April 7, 2005; Stripped, did not make weight | Vacant Title next held by Jorge Rodrigo Barrios |
