= Walter Wright (boxer) =

American boxer

Personal information
- Nickname: 2 Guns
- Nationality: American
- Born: February 20, 1981 (age 45) Seattle, Washington
- Weight: Super middleweight

Boxing career
- Stance: Orthodox

Boxing record
- Total fights: 25
- Wins: 17
- Win by KO: 8
- Losses: 8
- Draws: 0
- No contests: 0

Walter Wright (born February 20, 1981) is an American professional boxer.

== Amateur career ==
As an amateur, Wright amassed a 90-12 record, including 4 straight Tacoma Golden Gloves titles, appearing in the finals of the 2001 U.S. Amateur Championships, and the quarterfinals of the 2002 national Golden Gloves and u.s. amateur championships.

== Professional career ==
He opened his pro career by losing in his debut to Matt O'Brien by knockout, despite leading on all three cards. Wright then compiled a string of consecutive victories, becoming a regular fixture at the Battle at the Boat series at the Emerald Queen Casino in Washington, culminating in his appearance on the ESPN reality show "Contender Season 2", a welterweight tournament. Wright was chosen to be on the "Gold Team" for the show. He fought Andre Eason in the first round of the tourney, scoring a knockdown in the 1st round, and winning the fight 50-44 on all three judges' cards. He lost his quarterfinal bout to Cornelius Bundrage by unanimous decision; in a post-fight interview, Wright indicated that he'd decided to try and out-punch Bundrage, rather than out-box him. On September 26, 2006, Wright faced off against fellow Contender teammate Vinroy Barrett, winning by technical knockout in the 4th round of the 6 round bout.

On the January 12, 2007 edition of ESPN's Friday Night Fights at the Emerald Queen Casino in Tacoma, Washington, Wright squared off against undefeated but untested Dan Wallace, defeating Wallace by TKO in the eighth and final round.

Wright's next fight came on the Contender's USA vs. UK. challenge at the Metro Radio Arena in Newcastle upon Tyne, England. Wright faced undefeated Anthony Small at light middleweight. Wright came close to knocking Small out in the eighth round, but ran out of gas before he was able to do so. Wright lost by split decision ~ 75-77 | 74-78 | 77-76 ~.

3 years later, on June 19, 2010, Wright returned to the Emerald Queen Casino claiming he had never been away from the sport despite not competing, and won a unanimous decision in a 6-round super middleweight bout over Joshua Snyder.

Wright went on another sabbatical from competition for almost 3 years before filling in as a last minute replacement for Joey Spina on March 15, 2013 against Contender Season 1 finalist and former challenger for WBO super middleweight and WBC middleweight titles, Peter Manfredo Jr at the Twin River Casino Event Center in Rhode Island, and losing an over the limit super middleweight 10 rounder. Before taking the fight on short notice against Manfredo, Wright had served as sparring partner for James Kirkland and had signed to fight Omar Henry just before Henry's diagnosis with cancer, passing only months later.

== Professional boxing record ==
23 fights	17 wins	6 losses
By knockout	8	1
By decision	9	5
Draws	0	
No contests	0	

No.	Result	Record	Opponent	Type	Round, time	Date	Location	Notes
23	Loss	17–6	(Greece) Andreas Katzourakis	UD	6	2019-04-26	(United States) Quiet Cannon Country Club, Montebello, California, U.S.	
22	Loss	17–5	(United States) Mark DeLuca	UD	10	2018-10-20	(United States) TD Garden, Boston, Massachusetts, U.S.	Lost IBA and NABA welterweight titles.
21	Win	17–4	(United States) Mark DeLuca	SD	12	2018-06-23	(United States) Bank of New Hampshire Pavilion, Gilford, New Hampshire, U.S.	Won IBA and NABA welterweight titles.
20	Win	16–4	(United States) Eduardo Torres	RTD	5 (6), 3:00	2018-03-17	(United States) Emerald Queen Casino, Tacoma, Washington, U.S.	
19	Win	15–4	(United States) Rafael Valencia	UD	6	2018-01-12	(United States) Emerald Queen Casino, Tacoma, Washington, U.S.	
18	Loss	14–4	(United States) Peter Manfredo Jr.	UD	10	2013-03-15	(United States) Twin River Casino, Lincoln, Rhode Island, U.S.	
17	Win	14–3	(United States) Joshua Snyder	UD	6	2010-06-19	(United States) Emerald Queen Casino, Tacoma, Washington, U.S.	
16	Loss	13–3	(United Kingdom) Anthony Small	SD	8	2007-03-30	(United Kingdom) Metro Radio Arena, Newcastle, England	
15	Win	13–2	(United States) Dan Wallace	TKO	8 (8), 1:22	2007-01-12	(United States) Emerald Queen Casino, Tacoma, Washington, U.S.	
14	Win	12–2	(Jamaica) Vinroy Barrett	TKO	4 (6), 3:00	2006-09-26	(United States) Staples Center, Los Angeles, California, U.S.	
13	Loss	11–2	(United States) Cornelius Bundrage	UD	5	2006-02-03	(United States) Contender Gymnasium, Pasadena, California, U.S.	
12	Win	11–1	(United States) Andre Eason	UD	5	2006-01-23	(United States) Contender Gymnasium, Pasadena, California, U.S.	
11	Win	10–1	(Montenegro) Kemal Kolenovic	TKO	8 (10), 1:18	2005-10-22	(United States) Emerald Queen Casino, Tacoma, Washington, U.S.	
10	Win	9–1	(United States) Daniel Neal	UD	6	2005-09-17	(United States) Emerald Queen Casino, Tacoma, Washington, U.S.	
9	Win	8–1	(United States) Calvin Odom	UD	10	2005-07-30	(United States) Emerald Queen Casino, Tacoma, Washington, U.S.	
8	Win	7–1	(United States) Jerome Elder	TKO	2 (6), 2:11	2005-06-25	(United States) Emerald Queen Casino, Tacoma, Washington, U.S.	
7	Win	6–1	(United States) Darnell Boone	UD	8	2005-05-24	(United States) Northern Quest Resort & Casino, Airway Heights, Washington, U.S.	
6	Win	5–1	(United States) Walter Gilliam	KO	1 (4), 2:48	2005-05-14	(United States) Emerald Queen Casino, Tacoma, Washington, U.S.	
5	Win	4–1	(United States) Ray Craig	TKO	3 (4), 3:05	2005-02-25	(United States) Emerald Queen Casino, Tacoma, Washington, U.S.	
4	Win	3–1	(United States) Marcus Hicks	UD	4	2004-05-15	(United States) Emerald Queen Casino, Tacoma, Washington, U.S.	
3	Win	2–1	(United States) Mike Hannah	TKO	1 (4), 2:00	2004-04-03	(United States) Emerald Queen Casino, Tacoma, Washington, U.S.	
2	Win	1–1	(Mexico) Jose Medina	UD	4	2003-11-14	(United States) Seahawks Stadium West Club, Seattle, Washington, U.S.	
1	Loss	0–1	(Canada) Matt O'Brien	KO	3 (4), 0:38	2003-05-31	(United States) Emerald Queen Casino, Tacoma, Washington, U.S.	
