= Michael Clark (boxer) =

American boxer

Personal information
- Nickname: Cold Blood
- Nationality: American
- Born: Michael Clark; July 10, 1973 (age 53) Columbus, Ohio
- Weight: Welterweight

Boxing career
- Stance: Orthodox

Boxing record
- Total fights: 64
- Wins: 44
- Win by KO: 18
- Losses: 18
- Draws: 1
- No contests: 1

Michael Clark (born July 10, 1973) is an American professional boxer. He has twice won the IBC lightweight title. Commonly known by his nickname, "Cold Blood", he has also held the NABF and WBC Continental Americas lightweight titles, and been a challenger for the WBO lightweight title.

Product of a single-parent home, he grew up in Columbus, Ohio. He began boxing at age 7, and soon became accomplished within the amateur ring. His boxing coach, Matthew Voltolini, adopted him as a son at age 12. At 19 years old after winning the 1992 National Golden Gloves Featherweight title and losing in the semifinals of the U.S. Olympic trials, Michael turned professional, going 24-0 his first 6 years, when his first loss came from Artur Grigorian in a WBO lightweight title match.

On the ESPN reality show Contender Season 2, Clark volunteered to be the captain of the Gold Team and the first member of his team to box. He was knocked down by Cornelius Bundrage in the last of 5 rounds to lose by majority decision.
