= Joint Association of Boxers =

Union of professional boxers

The Joint Association of Boxers was founded as a union in May 2003 in order to obtain collective bargaining rights for boxers. Founded by Eddie Mustafa Muhammad, the JAB was affiliated with the International Brotherhood of Teamsters. In April 2004, the first fight organized by the JAB under a collective agreement was conducted between Jeremy Williams and Attila Levin.
