= Grady Brewer =

American boxer (born 1970)

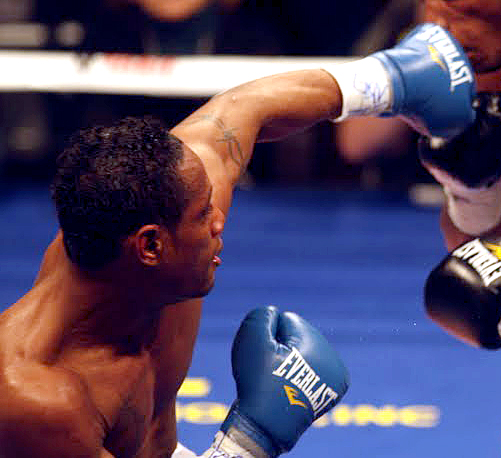
- Brewer vs. Lara, 2010

Personal information
- Nicknames: Bad Boy, Dinty Moore
- Born: December 22, 1970 (age 55) Lawton, Oklahoma, U.S.
- Height: 5 ft 10 in (178 cm)
- Weight: Light middleweight; Middleweight

Boxing career
- Reach: 73 in (185 cm)
- Stance: Orthodox

Boxing record
- Total fights: 52
- Wins: 32
- Win by KO: 16
- Losses: 20

Grady Lamont Brewer (born December 22, 1970) is an American former professional boxer who competed from 1999 to 2015. A former IBA and International Boxing Council (IBC) Light Middleweight titleholder, he is the 2006 winner of the ESPN reality show, The Contender. Outside the ring, he works at the Goodyear plant in Lawton to support his wife and four children.

In a family of boxers, it was natural that Brewer would also pick up the gloves. His amateur career started at age 11, and Brewer went on to win 40 of his 45 fights, the Oklahoma Golden Gloves tournament in his weight class, as well as winning a toughman tournament in Lawton, Oklahoma. His pro career has been marked with him as a professional "opponent," taking fights on short notice.

On the Contender season premiere, Brewer was picked for the Blue Team. He won his first fight on the show against rival Vinroy Barrett, and his second fight, against Michael Stewart by unanimous decision. In his third and possibly hardest fight, Grady defeated Norberto Bravo, after being knocked down in the opening round. On September 26, 2006 at the Staples Center in Los Angeles, California, Grady defeated Steve Forbes for the Contender title and championship by split decision.

In 2008, Brewer defeated fellow Contender contestant Cornelius Bundrage by split-decision in a 12-round IBO title eliminator. Brewer also owns "Bad Boy's Boxing and Fitness Gym" in Lawton, Oklahoma.

On August 22, 2009, Brewer defeated Albert Onolunose by knockout in the second round to capture the IBC Light Middleweight Title. He then won a knockout victory over previously unbeaten prospect Fernando Guerrero on June 17, 2011.

Preceded by Sergio Mora	The Contender Champion; 2006	Succeeded by Sakio Bika
