= Jorge Rodrigo Barrios =

Argentine boxer

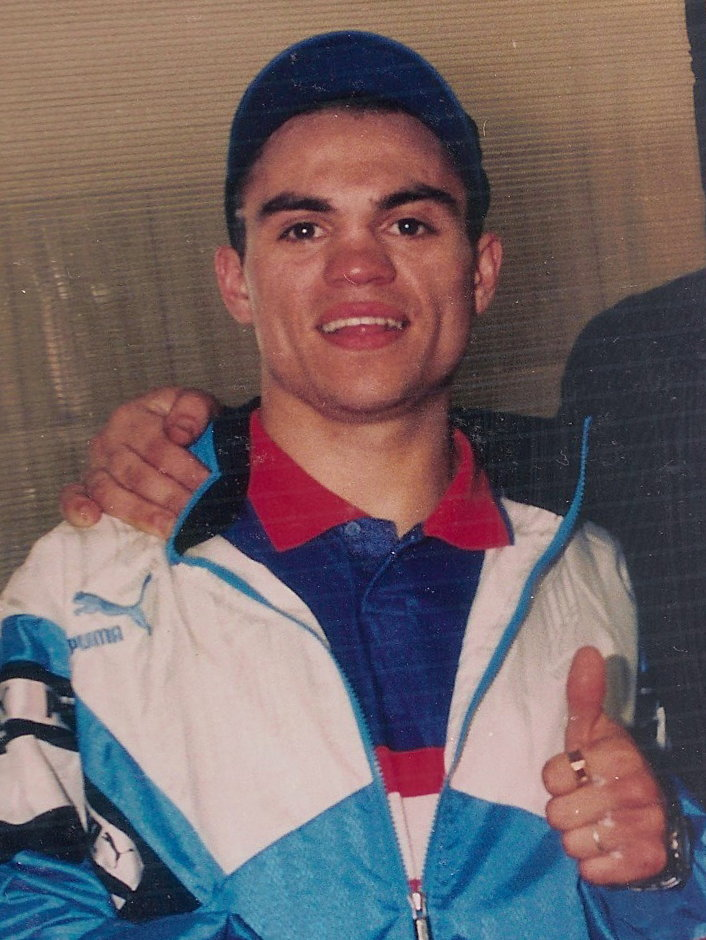

Personal information
- Nickname: La Hiena
- Born: August 1, 1976 (age 49) Tigre, Buenos Aires, Argentina
- Height: 5 ft 6 in (168 cm)
- Weight: Super featherweight

Boxing career
- Stance: Orthodox

Boxing record
- Total fights: 60
- Wins: 53
- Win by KO: 36
- Losses: 5
- Draws: 1
- No contests: 1

Jorge Rodrigo Barrios (born August 1, 1976) is an Argentine former professional boxer who held the WBO junior lightweight title.

== Professional career ==
Barrios made his professional boxing debut on August 10, 1996, with a second-round knockout victory. Barrios accumulated a record of 14–0 before his first loss—a disqualification against César Emilio Domine on December 20, 1997.

After the disqualification loss, Barrios went on a 25-0-1-1 streak. Then, on August 9, 2003, Barrios fought in a superfight against Acelino Freitas for the WBA and WBO 130 lb titles. In the eighth round, Freitas was hit while off balance for a knockdown. In the eleventh round, Freitas was knocked down by a left-right combination and spit out his mouthpiece. As the bell rang at the end of the round, however, Barrios was knocked down by a powerful right hand to the chin. Despite the 60-second break between rounds, Freitas followed up early in the twelfth round with another knockdown of Barrios. A few moments later, Barrios went to his knees and wobbled when he stood up, causing the referee to award Freitas a TKO victory. The eleventh round won The Ring magazine's Round of the Year award.

On April 8, 2005, Barrios fought against undefeated WBO junior lightweight champion Mike Anchondo. Even though Anchondo weighed 4 3/4 lb over the weight limit, Barrios won the title and ended Anchondo's unbeaten streak with a fourth-round TKO.

Barrios' last title defense was against undefeated contender Janos Nagy on May 20, 2006. Barrios ended the fight 49 seconds into the first round with a liver punch knockout.

At the weigh-in before his next scheduled defense—September 16, 2006, against undefeated Joan Guzmán—Barrios was overweight, and so he was stripped of his title. Barrios then lost the fight by split decision.

Barrios was scheduled to fight Juan Manuel Márquez (47-3-1 35 KOs) for the WBC Super Featherweight Title on September 15, 2007. Barrios withdrew from the fight due to injury.

On September 6, 2008, Rocky Juarez, (27-4, 19 KO's) won by TKO at 2:55 in the 11th round of the 12-rounder over Barrios, (47-3-1, 34 KO's).

== Negligent homicide ==
On January 24, 2010, Barrios was involved in a car accident in which a 20-year-old pregnant woman was killed in the Argentine city of Mar del Plata. Barrios ran a red light and fled the scene after the accident. Barrios turned himself to the police several hours after the accident. He was suspected of driving under the influence of alcohol but it could not proven given his late arrest. On April 4, 2012, Barrios was declared guilty of negligent homicide and sentenced to spend four years in prison. Three weeks later, Barrios was released from prison after paying a AR$ 200,000 bail.

In November 2014, Barrios finally headed to prison for three and a half years.

== Professional boxing record ==
60 fights	53 wins	5 losses
By knockout	36	2
By decision	15	2
By disqualification	2	1
Draws	1	
No contests	1	

No.	Result	Record	Opponent	Type	Round, time	Date	Location	Notes
60	Loss	53–5–1 (1)	Jonathan Victor Barros	UD	10 (10)	2021-02-20	Arena Villa Carlos Paz, Villa Carlos Paz, Argentina	
59	Win	53–4–1 (1)	Diego Alberto Chaves	SD	10 (10)	2019-09-28	Monaco Hotel & Resort, Villa Carlos Paz, Argentina	
58	Win	52–4–1 (1)	Esteban Miguel Stodulsky	UD	10 (10)	2019-06-15	Sportsman Club Social y Deportivo, Villa Canas, Argentina	
57	Win	51–4–1 (1)	Adailton de Jesus	TKO	8 (10)	2018-12-14	Polideportivo Municipal, Villa de María del Río Seco, Argentina	
56	Win	50–4–1 (1)	Wilson Alcorro	UD	10	2010-10-01	Club de Regatas, Corrientes, Argentina	
55	Win	49–4–1 (1)	Michael Lozada	TKO	5 (12)	2009-11-21	Buenos Aires Lawn Tennis Club, Buenos Aires, Argentina	For Interim WBO Latino Lightweight title.
54	Win	48–4–1 (1)	Moises Castro	UD	12	2009-08-08	Polideportivo Carlos Cerutti, Córdoba, Argentina	Won Interim WBO Latino Lightweight title.
53	Loss	47–4–1 (1)	Rocky Juarez	TKO	11 (12) 2:55	2008-09-06	Toyota Center, Houston, Texas, U.S.	For vacant WBO Latino Super featherweight title.
52	Win	47–3–1 (1)	Decho Kokietgym	KO	3 (12)	2007-04-21	Estadio Luna Park, Buenos Aires, Argentina	Won WBO Inter-Continental Super featherweight title.
51	Loss	46–3–1 (1)	Joan Guzmán	SD	12	2006-09-16	MGM Grand Garden Arena, Las Vegas, Nevada, U.S.	Lost WBO Super featherweight title.
50	Win	46–2–1 (1)	János Nagy	KO	1 (12) 0:49	2006-05-20	Staples Center, Los Angeles, California, U.S.	Retained WBO Super featherweight title.
49	Win	45–2–1 (1)	Nazareno Ruiz	UD	10	2005-12-16	Club Belgrano, San Nicolás de los Arroyos, Buenos Aires, Argentina	
48	Win	44–2–1 (1)	Victor Santiago	TKO	2 (12) 2:30	2005-08-12	Orfeo Superdomo, Córdoba, Argentina	For WBO Super featherweight title.
47	Win	43–2–1 (1)	Mike Anchondo	TKO	4 (12) 2:00	2005-04-08	Miccosukee Resort & Gaming, Miami, Florida, U.S.	Won WBO Super featherweight title.
46	Win	42–2–1 (1)	Carlos Uribe	TKO	7 (12) 0:01	2004-10-08	Orfeo Superdomo, Córdoba, Argentina	For WBO Latino Super featherweight title.
45	Win	41–2–1 (1)	Diego Alzugaray	UD	10	2004-04-17	Club Atlético Unión, Santa Fe, Argentina	
44	Win	40–2–1 (1)	Claudio Martinet	UD	12	2003-12-12	Club Newell's Old Boys, Rosario, Santa Fe, Argentina	For WBO Latino Super featherweight title.
43	Loss	39–2–1 (1)	Acelino Freitas	TKO	12 (12) 0:50	2003-08-09	Miami Arena, Miami, Florida, U.S.	For WBO and WBA (Super) Super featherweight titles.
42	Win	39–1–1 (1)	Fabian Salazar	KO	4 (10)	2003-04-10	Orfeo Superdomo, Córdoba, Argentina	
41	Win	38–1–1 (1)	Orlando Soto	TKO	4 (12)	2003-01-31	Casino Buenos Aires, Buenos Aires, Argentina	For WBO Latino Super Featherweight title.
40	Win	37–1–1 (1)	Rodolfo Rolon	TKO	6 (10)	2002-11-29	Club Defensores de Villa Luján, San Miguel de Tucumán, Argentina	
39	Win	36–1–1 (1)	Carlos Rios	TD	6 (10)	2002-10-26	Estadio F. A. B., Buenos Aires, Argentina	Won vacant Argentine Super Featherweight title.
38	Win	35–1–1 (1)	Javier Alvarez	TKO	11 (12)	2002-08-24	Radisson Victoria Plaza, Montevideo, Uruguay	Won WBO Latino Super Featherweight title.
37	Draw	34–1–1 (1)	Ricardo Silva	PTS	10	2002-06-29	Río Gallegos, Santa Cruz, Argentina	
36	Win	34–1 (1)	Keylang Umana	KO	1 (10)	2002-04-13	Santa Rosa, La Pampa, Argentina	
35 (1)	Win	33–1 (1)	Victor Paz	UD	10	2002-03-16	Estadio F. A. B., Buenos Aires, Argentina	
34	Win	32–1 (1)	Justo Martinez	KO	6 (10)	2001-09-22	Estadio F. A. B., Buenos Aires, Argentina	
33	NC	31–1 (1)	Justo Martinez	NC	2 (10)	2001-06-23	Villa María, Córdoba, Argentina	
32	Win	31–1	Laureano Ramírez	UD	12	2000-12-16	Piso de los Deportes, Mar del Plata, Buenos Aires, Argentina	For WBU Super featherweight title.
31	Win	30–1	Carlos Uribe	DQ	5 (10) 2:17	2000-10-28	Club Atlético Lanús, Buenos Aires, Argentina	
30	Win	29–1	Joel Mayo	DQ	3 (10) 1:55	2000-03-18	Club Ciclista Juninense, Junín, Buenos Aires, Argentina	
29	Win	28–1	Sergio Liendo	RTD	5 (10)	2000-02-05	San Carlos de Bolívar, Buenos Aires, Argentina	
28	Win	27–1	Joao Pereira da Silva	RTD	6 (10) 0:31	1999-12-18	Radisson Victoria Plaza, Montevideo, Uruguay	
27	Win	26–1	Affif Djelti	UD	12	1999-10-16	Club Los Padres Capuchinos, Concordia, Argentina	For WBU Super featherweight title.
26	Win	25–1	Catalino Becerra	TKO	2 (10)	1999-08-28	Club Glorias, Tigre, Buenos Aires, Argentina	
25	Win	24–1	Silvano Usini	TKO	8 (12)	1999-07-10	Calatafimi-Segesta, Sicily, Italy	Won vacant WBU Super featherweight title.
24	Win	23–1	Oscar Lopez	KO	6 (10)	1999-03-05	Mar del Plata, Buenos Aires, Argentina	
23	Win	22–1	Ismael Agustini	UD	12	1998-12-18	Morón, Buenos Aires, Argentina	For South American Super featherweight title.
22	Win	21–1	Gustavo Cuello	UD	12	1998-10-03	Estadio F. A. B., Buenos Aires, Argentina	For South American Super featherweight title.
21	Win	20–1	Walter Rodriguez	TKO	2 (12)	1998-08-15	Estadio F. A. B., Buenos Aires, Argentina	Won South American Super featherweight title.
20	Win	19–1	Jorge Medina	KO	1 (8)	1998-07-18	Buenos Aires, Argentina	
19	Win	18–1	Miguel Angel Francia	TKO	5 (8)	1998-05-09	Club Juventud BBC, Santiago del Estero, Argentina	
18	Win	17–1	Antonio Avila	KO	1 (10)	1998-04-10	Estadio F. A. B., Buenos Aires, Argentina	
17	Win	16–1	Ruben Astorga	KO	3 (8)	1998-03-06	Tigre, Buenos Aires, Argentina	
16	Win	15–1	César Domine	KO	2 (8)	1998-02-13	Club Atlético Quilmes, Mar del Plata, Buenos Aires, Argentina	
15	Loss	14–1	César Domine	DQ	4 (10)	1997-12-20	Estadio F. A. B., Buenos Aires, Argentina	
14	Win	14–0	Manuel Billalba	RTD	9 (10)	1997-11-22	Estadio F. A. B., Buenos Aires, Argentina	
13	Win	13–0	Rodolfo Rolon	TKO	5 (8)	1997-08-23	Estadio F. A. B., Buenos Aires, Argentina	
12	Win	12–0	Eduardo Rodriguez	KO	1 (8)	1997-08-02	Canal 9 Studios, Buenos Aires, Argentina	
11	Win	11–0	Miguel Angel Albarado	SD	8	1997-06-21	Canal 9 Studios, Buenos Aires, Argentina	
10	Win	10–0	Dante Tablada	KO	1 (8)	1997-05-17	Canal 9 Studios, Buenos Aires, Argentina	
9	Win	9–0	Benjamin Robles Murry	TKO	1 (6)	1997-04-19	Canal 9 Studios, Buenos Aires, Argentina	
8	Win	8–0	Pedro Contreras	KO	5 (8)	1997-03-22	Buenos Aires, Argentina	
7	Win	7–0	Osvaldo Cortes	KO	1 (8)	1997-02-22	Buenos Aires, Argentina	
6	Win	6–0	José Luis Fernandez	KO	1 (8)	1997-01-25	Buenos Aires, Argentina	
5	Win	5–0	Nestor Ayala	UD	6	1996-12-21	Buenos Aires, Argentina	
4	Win	4–0	Walter Galvan	KO	2 (6)	1996-12-14	Canal 9 Studios, Buenos Aires, Argentina	
3	Win	3–0	Fabian Eluaiza	KO	4 (6)	1996-11-16	América 2 Studios, Buenos Aires, Argentina	
2	Win	2–0	Nestor Centeno	KO	1 (6)	1996-09-06	Estadio F. A. B., Buenos Aires, Argentina	
1	Win	1–0	Hector Martinez	KO	2 (6)	1996-08-10	Buenos Aires, Argentina	

== See also ==
- List of world super-featherweight boxing champions

Sporting positions
Regional boxing titles
Preceded by Walter Hugo Rodriguez	South American super featherweight title August 15, 1998 – 1999; Vacated	Vacant Title next held by Javier Osvaldo Alvarez
Minor world boxing titles
Vacant Title last held by Angel Manfredy	WBU super featherweight champion July 10, 1999 – 2001; Vacated	Vacant Title next held by Phillip N'dou
Major World boxing titles
Preceded by Mike Anchondo	WBO super featherweight champion April 8, 2005 – September 15, 2006; Stripped, did not make weight	Vacant Title next held by Joan Guzmán
Awards
Previous: Micky Ward vs. Arturo Gatti; Round 9	The Ring magazine Round of the Year vs. Acelino Freitas; Round 11; 2003	Next: Erik Morales vs. Marco Antonio Barrera III; Round 11
