= The Contender season 2 =

The Contender
- Season 2
- No. of episodes: 15

Release
- Original network: ESPN
- Original release: July 18 – September 26, 2006

Season chronology
- ← Previous; Season 1 Next → Season 3

The Contender 2 is a reality television show based on the sport of boxing, but with an element of the (welterweight) competitor's lives and relationships with each other within the show's living quarters, based in Pasadena, California. Filmed in January and February 2006, the show began airing on July 18, 2006. The winner of The Contender Season 2 was decided in a bout at the Staples Center, Los Angeles, broadcast live on September 26, 2006, winning a purse of US$500,000. The Contender 2 was shown on ESPN in the US, in the UK on ITV4, in Canada on TSN, in Australia on FOX8, in New Zealand on TV2, and on AXN in South and Southeast Asia.

The show took the format of a gameshow, with the boxers divided into two teams (blue and gold) in a "playground pick" on the first episode. These teams competed for the right to choose which of their team members fights that week, and who he fights against. The second half of the hour long episodes are mostly taken up with that fight: the loser is eliminated.

The program was hosted by Sugar Ray Leonard, former champion boxer. Sylvester Stallone, who famously portrayed the boxer Rocky Balboa in the Rocky series of films, is the show's executive producer. It was also produced by Mark Burnett. Unlike in season 1, Stallone does not appear on camera; at the time the series was taped, he was making Rocky Balboa, the sixth installment in the Rocky movie series. The movie premiered in December 2006.

== Contestants ==
Blue Team	Gold Team
Nick Acevedo	Gary "Tiger" Balletto
Norberto "El Gallito" Bravo	Vinroy "Slick" Barrett
Grady "Bad Boy" Brewer	Rudy Cisneros
Cornelius "K-9" Bundrage	Michael "Cold Blood" Clark
Freddy "Furious Freddy" Curiel	Ebo "The X-treme Machine" Elder
Andre "Daredevil" Eason	Steve "2 Pound" Forbes
Micheal "No Joke" Stewart	Jeff "Hell Raza" Fraza
Aaron Torres	Walter "2 Guns" Wright

== Episode guide ==
Episode numbers refer to the progression of matches in the tournament. Episodes one and two aired together at full length, while seven and eight, eleven and twelve, and thirteen and fourteen were one-hour "doubleheaders" featuring two bouts.

Episode	Original US air date	Description	Winner
1	July 18, 2006	The Contenders arrive and are split up into their teams before moving into a communal loft apartment: the teams each have a large room to themselves for sleeping and strategy. They spend a day training and sparring, then are woken at 5 am the next day for roadwork. The first fight is chosen by volunteers from each team. Michael Clark represents Gold and Cornelius "K9" Bundrage for Blue. Clark apparently underestimated Bundrage in the first two rounds, but then came back to win two of his own, in front of his adopted father/boxing coach and fiancée, until Bundrage throws a punch to knock Clark down in the fifth round, securing the win by majority decision (two judges saying he won, one saying it was a tie).	Blue
2	July 18, 2006	The blue team were rewarded for their victory in the first fight with a dinner with Alfonso Gomez. Cornelius chooses to fight in the second fight of the second round. The blue team also get to choose this week's matchup. The gold team is shown weighing themselves in the trainer's room (they have to fight as welterweights, at 149 pounds (68 kg)). Rudy Cisneros is shown having difficulty making weight, weighing in at 160 pounds (73 kg). Norberto was chosen to fight Rudy, due to the weight problem. Rudy was shown running with a sweatsuit to lose the 10 lbs in 14 hours—both fighters weighed in at under 149 for the bout. To the fight then, where Norberto easily won rounds 1 and 3, and Rudy stepped it up to take rounds 2 and 4. However, Norberto had enough energy to take the final round, and won by split decision, with judge Max DeLuca scoring 49–46 Norberto, judge Lou Moret scoring 48–47 Rudy, and judge Fritz Warner scoring 49–46 Norberto.	Blue
3	July 25, 2006	Norberto chooses to place himself in the last fight of the second round. Some of the members of the blue team question his choice, noting that fighting last in the second round means a long rest between the first round and the second, but very little between the second and the third. In the loft, there is a lot of trash-talking by members of both teams, setting the stage for a rivalry between Grady and Vinroy—Vinroy accuses Grady of trying to duck out on fighting him, while Grady reminds the gold team that blue makes the decisions for this fight. There is a training scene, where Alfonso Gomez spars with several contestants. Then, Aaron is chosen to fight Gary. During the interviews of Gary and Aaron, Gary goes over his fight strategy while Aaron spends most of his time trash-talking Gary, saying "If I lose to Gary, I'll retire." Aaron believes that Gary is a good boxer but will not win because he doesn't have enough motivation. Gary's plan for the fight seems to be to go for a quick KO, punching hard, while Aaron is trying to box and bob his way inside Gary's reach and hold his arms when he swings big. The first round, Gary is shown landing some large shots to Aaron, but Aaron is effective at tying the bigger man up and lands some bombs of his own. In the second, Gary is the aggressor, while Aaron seems to be mostly bobbing and weaving out of the way of punches. Same for the third round, where Aaron accidentally grabs Gary's knee and lifts, knocking Gary down. Between rounds, Gary is shown bleeding, while Aaron is merely sweaty. In the fourth round, Aaron seems to hurt Gary, then slips and falls. In the fifth round, both boxers stand toe-to-toe and slug—the ring announcer refers to it as "boxing in a phonebooth." The final result is James Jen-Kin 48–47 for Balletto, Marty Denkin 47–48 for Torres and Chuck Hassett 48–47 Balletto.	Gold
4	August 1, 2006	While the gold team lauds Gary on his victory, Blue discusses the implications of Aaron's loss. Grady uses the opportunity to again insult Aaron, saying he should have been the one to fight instead of Aaron. The gold team are all given Polaroid digital cameras as a reward, and Gary also receives a framed photo of the fight. Saying it was partially due to the injuries suffered in the battle against Aaron, Gary chooses to fight in the last bout of round two, against Norberto, who says that his plan is to try to re-open the cut by Gary's left eye. There is a training sequence, first the contestants have to stack tires in a truck with Tommy, then hit focus mitts with Jeremy. Walter is shown working hard at training, while Andre is shown as much slower and less enthusiastic. Grady spends some time talking with his family, and the teams then discuss who's fighting next. The blue team expects Vinroy to call out Grady, but the gold team uses the power to choose to play head games with the blue team. Instead, Walter toes the line, and chooses to fight Andre. There is also a scene showing a close relationship between Cornelius and Andre, where Cornelius discusses the Bible with Andre and even says he is like "a little brother". In the fight, Andre is knocked down in the 1st round. It seems Walter has a good chance to win the match by KO, but he gets cocky and shows off some instead. Andre never manages to win a round; Walter wins 50–44 on all three cards in the show's first unanimous victory.	Gold
5	August 8, 2006	There is a recap of the previous action, then in-ring congratulations to Walter from his girlfriend and Sugar Ray. Back at the loft, the contestants await Walter's return, and they laud him when he comes up the elevator. "Sugar" Shane Mosley arrives with the reward for the victorious Gold team—designer leather jackets and sunglasses for everyone. There is a training sequence, with various contestants sparring with Mosely, including Walter (who uses the opportunity to try to showcase his talents). Then, they are shown running behind Tommy in a pickup truck, and Alfonso Gomez is shown sparring with them. Walter and Cornelius exchange words, setting up another rivalry on the show. The time comes to select the position that Walter will fight in for the quarterfinals; he indicates that he's torn between fighting first and fighting against Cornelius; when he puts his plate in the slot for week nine, Cornelius taunts him, saying "smart choice", and Walter decides to change his decision; he will fight Cornelius in the quarterfinals. Then, the fight selection for this episode; Vinroy calls out Grady. Grady is shown talking to his wife and children, while Vinroy calls his family back in Jamaica. Just before the fight, he is surprised by his wife and two girls showing up in the locker room. The fighters talk about their plans, and Jeff Goldblum is shown in the audience just before the introductions. Grady apparently wins the first round handily, cornering Vinroy and out-punching him; the second round has the same theme, with Grady cornering Vinroy and not letting up. In the third round, Vinroy "accidentally" headbutts Grady, cutting him by his right eye. The referee pauses the bout for the doctor to examine Grady, who is deemed fit to continue. Vinroy appears to win this round, coming behind his jab to score. Grady fights defensively in the fourth round, but Vinroy appears unable to capitalize on it, sticking with the jab only. In the fifth round, both boxers stand toe-to-toe and slug it out, which is to Grady's advantage, being shorter; later on in the round, Grady chases Vinroy around the ring, catching him on the ropes to win the round. Grady wins by unanimous decision, Dr. James Jen-Kin scoring 48–47, with Marty Denkin and Fritz Warner both scoring it 49–46.	Blue
6	August 15, 2006	Grady is shown receiving six stitches near his eye, where Vinroy caught him with the headbutt. When he returns, he is lauded by his teammates for his victory. The ceremony where he chooses a slot to fight in for the next round isn't shown in full like in previous weeks, but he chooses to fight in week eleven. The contestants get to meet Willie McGinest, who gives the blue team designer wristwatches as a reward for Grady's victory. The contestants train, and talk about Steve Forbes' record. The blue team argue amongst themselves about who's fighting next. When the time comes to choose, Michael Stewart chooses to fight Ebo. When the men's wives are interviewed, it turns out that the two families have become close, and Ebo's wife hopes that the relationship will continue regardless of the outcome of the fight. The morning before the fight, Michael and Ebo have breakfast together, both commenting on how unusual it is to do so; they both say how much they respect each other in interviews. In the first round of the fight, Ebo seemed to dominate, closing with jabs and forcing Michael to the ropes; Michael lands a couple of big shots, but not enough to win the round. In the second and third rounds, Ebo tries the same game plan, successfully, although in both cases, Michael lands more big shots than Ebo; Ebo's volume wins out. In the fourth round, Michael lands a huge left hook, stunning Ebo, and slowing him. After this point, every time they close, Michael manages to land a power punch, culminating in a knockout punch coming from a left hook. Ebo manages to rise by the count of nine, but when he is asked to walk towards the referee, he stumbles and keeps his hands down, so the referee ends the fight at that point, 1:52 in the fourth round. After the fight, both men talk with their wives and the camera, discussing their feelings about fighting a friend; Michael seems especially broken-up, saying he'd have to pray for Ebo's family, and thanking the referee for stopping the fight before Ebo is hurt. Ebo is taken away in an ambulance as a precaution; the ring doctor indicates that he's worried that there might be slow bleeding in Ebo's brain.	Blue
7	August 22, 2006	The contestants discuss the upcoming two bouts—Freddy is unsure about boxing Steve, as Michael was supposed to box Steve instead of Ebo. However, he says "to be the best, you've got to beat the best", referring to Steve's world title. Jeff and Nick wish each other luck, and we see the men's pre-fight routine; Nick trains, while Jeff relaxes. After the fight selection (Freddy chooses Steve, and Nick defaults to fighting Jeff), Freddy has dinner with his family, who all express confidence in him. On fight day, during the introductions for the first fight (Nick vs Jeff), we see Joe Pantoliano and Burt Reynolds in the crowd. The men square off in the center of the ring, trading punches, with Nick getting slightly the better of Jeff in both power and number of punches landed. Sergio and Sugar Ray comment on how good Nick's form is, and Sergio says to Burt that Nick won the round. The second round finds Jeff getting backed up by Nick, who seemingly lands body blows at will. Jeremy, Jeff's trainer, lets him know that he's down 2 rounds now. In the third round, Jeff seems to mount more of an offence, using his jab effectively to set up big punches, but Nick doesn't take it lying down, as he counters well throughout the round. Jeff is shown with a cut over his left eye in between rounds. For the fourth round, the two men again trade bows, perhaps a bit more evenly than in the first round; Jeff seems to think he won the round, as does Jeremy. Sugar Ray tells Burt that "this round here decides it." The men touch gloves and begin the round, which Nick seems to win handily, landing combinations at will, until Jeff's right hand finds Nick's left eye to slow him, opening a cut. They trade punches, where again, Nick does more work, leading to a unanimous decision win for Nick.	Blue
8	August 22, 2006	In the second bout of the night, Peter Manfredo is shown in the crowd. Before the introductions, Steve says "none of the other contenders called me out. I want to show them why they didn't..." The first round has a lot of action, with Freddy landing a series of powerful overhand rights just before the bell. In the second round, Steve twice winds up landing a series of left and right hook combinations, easily winning the round. The third round has Freddy landing more blows, using his jab to set up body punches. The round ends with Steve throwing a flurry, and Gary saying he's unsure who won the round. The fourth round finds Steve trading, taking a jab from Freddy to land a hook of his own. He lands a huge uppercut after the boxers separate from a clinch. In the final round, Steve shines, effectively avoiding Freddy's punches to land his own seemingly at will; the few punches Freddy lands wind up on his shoulders and elbows, not on target at all. Steve winds up winning a unanimous decision.	Gold
9	August 29, 2006	The trainers congratulate the remaining contestants, who are taken out for a reward as a group, receiving new suits at an LA boutique. Steve and Nick both have interviews with the camera, and spend some family time before the fight. In the bout, Nick's plan is to out-work Steve, who chooses to bob & weave, picking his shots. Nick's plan works for the first round, which Steve (in his corner) says was lost because he was "finding his rhythm." The second round seems to go to Steve, who is shown effectively avoiding Nick's punches, and landing a number of his own. The third round seems to cut Nick's way, with his volume and power winning out. Both the fourth and fifth rounds go to Steve, apparently, as Nick has tired himself out. Steve wins by split decision (one judge for Nick, the rest for Steve). After the fight, Nick confirms that he punched himself out; he was too tired to maintain his offense in the end of the bout.	Steve Forbes
10	September 5, 2006	The remaining contestants congratulate Steve on his victory. Along with his congratulations, Sugar Ray gives Steve a portable DVD player, and recordings of the two bouts that he has been in during the competition, as a prize. There is a training sequence, with Cornelius in the ring sparring, and trying to taunt Walter. The two are shown having words in a number of situations; Cornelius says, in an interview, that he's trying to get under Walter's skin to gain a psychological edge in their bout. The two men discuss their similar family histories in interviews, and spend some time with their loved ones before the fight – Cornelius with his wife and son at a local park, Walter with his girlfriend and uncle (who essentially adopted Walter in his teen years). During the fight, the first three rounds all played out fairly similarly, with Cornelius getting in close, smothering Walter, tying up his arms, and hitting while holding; Cornelius appears to win the 1st round, Walter the 2nd and 3rd. Cornelius receives several warnings from the referee for various fouls, including a headbutt, culminating in the referee coming to his corner in between the 3rd and 4th rounds, asking "do you want me to have to take a point away? Knock it off|" The later rounds are cleaner, but Walter seemingly couldn't put out enough volume to impress the judges, so Cornelius wins 2 more rounds and a unanimous decision.	Cornelius Bundrage
11	September 12, 2006	The remaining contestants congratulate Cornelius on his victory; he is shown with a bandage over his right cheek. Sugar Ray takes the men to his house in Hollywood, where they all seem impressed (Norberto states "I thought it was a hotel..."). Michael Stewart talks about his plan for the upcoming fight; he wants to end it early with a KO. Grady says, in an interview, that he's been holding back, and wants to show what he can do. The fight is a repetition of five rounds that all look alike; Stewart tries to set up a one-punch knockout, and Brewer bobs and weaves to make him miss, while setting up counterpunches. In between rounds, Tommy congratulates Grady while reminding him not to get cocky, while Jeremy exhorts Michael to try to win the round, despite Michael's seeming lack of heart. The result is a 50–45 shutout on all three cards.	Grady Brewer
12	September 12, 2006	Norberto and Gary square off, touching gloves before the first punch in the first round is thrown. The fight plays out very much like the Stewart-Brewer bout, with Gary trying to set up big punches, and Norberto keeping himself away while setting up counterpunches. Gary is slightly more successful than Michael was, but the result is the same; a win for the counterpuncher. Two judges had it 49–46, and one scored 48–47.	Norberto Bravo
13	September 19, 2006	Steve comments to Jeremy how quiet the loft is now that the other contestants are mostly gone. Sugar Ray brings the remaining four together for a video retrospective of the men who have been knocked out of the tournament, where they all talk about how their experience has affected them. There is a final training sequence, with Jeremy and Tommy encouraging their respective boxers, planning their final bout before the finals. For the final two bouts, all twelve of the men knocked out of the tournament get ringside seats. We see Joe Pantoliano again in the audience, as well as Dennis Miller and his wife. The Forbes-Bundrage fight plays out a bit like the Bundrage-Wright; Cornelius comes out hitting hard, trying to hold and tie up Steve. However, in this case, Forbes is a better boxer than Bundrage; he manages to escape the holds, and throws several flurries that win him rounds, and ultimately the match.	Steve Forbes
14	September 19, 2006	The second bout of the night, and the last of the semifinals, pits Norberto against Grady. Norberto comes out swinging, and knocks Grady down in the first round with a powerful hook, but Grady out-boxes him in the later rounds, deftly scoring with a jab or hook, and ducking Norberto's counterpunch. The scores come in, 47–47, 48–46, and 49–46, and Grady pulls out a majority decision.	Grady Brewer

== Tournament Tracker ==
While The Contender: Season 2 is a reality TV show, it does contain a serious competition with a proper format - a 16-man knockout tournament.

=== Preliminary round ===
1. Cornelius (B) beat Michael C (G) by majority decision.
2. Norberto (B) beat Rudy (G) by split decision.
3. Gary (G) beat Aaron (B) by split decision.
4. Walter (G) beat Andre (B) by unanimous decision.
5. Grady (B) beat Vinroy (G) by unanimous decision.
6. Michael S (B) beat Ebo (G) by KO.
7. Nick (B) beat Jeff (G) by unanimous decision.
8. Steve (G) beat Freddy (B) by unanimous decision.

=== Quarterfinals ===
Quarterfinal bouts are determined by the individual winner of each preliminary bout. The winner can choose which episode they will box in, and may choose their own opponent.

9. Steve beat Nick by split decision.
10. Cornelius beat Walter by unanimous decision.
11. Grady beat Michael by unanimous decision.
12. Norberto beat Gary by unanimous decision.

=== Semifinals ===
Semifinal bouts are determined by the individual winner of each quarterfinal bout. The winner can choose which episode they will box in, and may choose their own opponent.

13. Steve beat Cornelius by unanimous decision.
14. Grady beat Norberto by majority decision.

=== Finals ===
15. Grady beat Steve by split decision to win the contender title.

Grady got ahead early with body shots. Steve then beat him inside in the 4th and 5th. There was slow fighting until the end of the bout, but Grady landed more punches in the final 5 rounds. Grady won in a split decision. The scores were: David Mendoza 93–97, Max DeLuca 96–94 and José Cobián 94–96.

For third place, Cornelius beat Norberto by TKO in the 7th round of 8. Cornelius knocked Norberto down in the 2nd, and was eventually penalized a point for shoving, but overall the match was one-sided, as Cornelius simply jabbed and set up straight rights to win.

As undercard bouts on the final, Walter beat Vinroy by TKO in the 4th of 6, Freddy beat Aaron by unanimous decision in 6, and Nick beat Nurhan Suleymanoglu by unanimous decision in 6.

Storm Large, who was a contestant on Burnett's Rock Star: Supernova, sang "The Star-Spangled Banner" prior to the card.

(Numbers refer to the episode in which the fight took place.)

== Weekly results ==
Elimination Chart
Contestant	1	2	3	4	5	6	7	8	9	10	11	12
Grady					WIN					WIN	WIN	Winner
Steve							WIN	WIN			WIN	Runner-up
Norberto		WIN								WIN	LOSE	
Cornelius	WIN								WIN		LOSE	
Gary			WIN							LOSE		
Micheal						WIN				LOSE		
Walter				WIN					LOSE			
Nick							WIN	LOSE				
Freddy							LOSE					
Jeff							LOSE					
Ebo						LOSE						
Vinroy					LOSE							
Andre				LOSE								
Aaron			LOSE									
Rudy		LOSE										
Michael	LOSE											

Cornflower blue and WIN means the boxer won the match.
Red and LOSE means the boxer lost the match.

== Guest appearances ==
A number of professional athletes appeared on the show, offering advice to the contestants, including:

- Peter Manfredo Jr.
- Sergio Mora
- Alfonso Gomez
- "Sugar" Shane Mosley
- Willie McGinest

== Trainers ==
- Tommy Gallagher
- Jeremy Williams
