= Joseph Awinongya =

Ghanaian boxing trainer

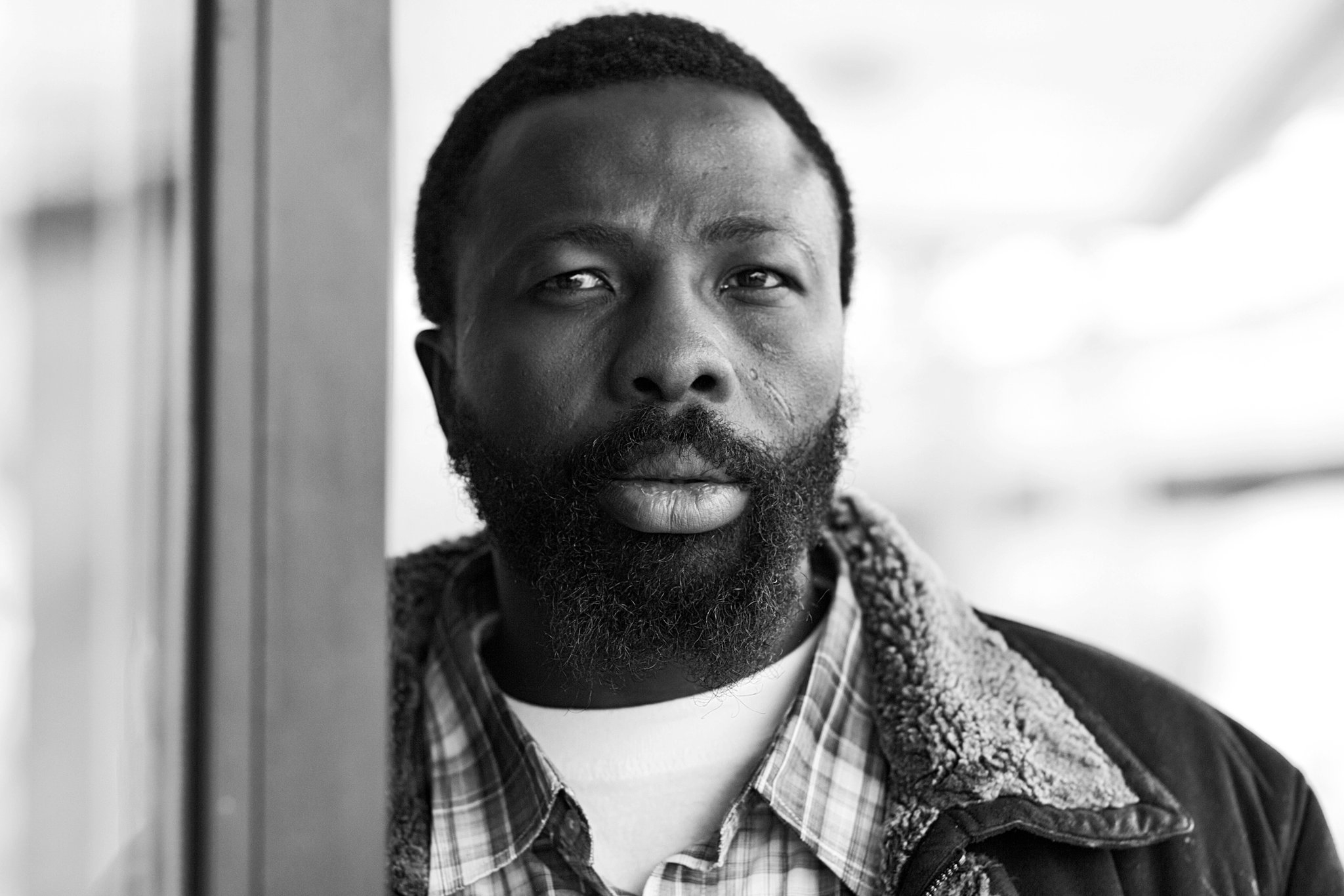
- Joseph Awinongya

Personal information
- Nickname: African Assassin
- Nationality: Ghanaian
- Born: Joseph Awinongya; April 20, 1974 (age 52) Ghana
- Weight: Cruiserweight

Boxing career

Joseph Awinongya (born 1974 in Ashaiman, Ghana) is a Ghanaian-American professional boxing trainer and public speaker on sports. He trains amateur and professional boxers in Joliet, Illinois, and is best known as the trainer of IBO International Middleweight champion Osumanu Adama. He was also a former professional cruiserweight boxer known as 'The African Assassin'.

== Boxing career ==
Awinongya was signed by Don King as a cruiserweight boxer after being seen while sparring in Europe. Awinongya compiled a professional record of 12–9–5 with 3 knockouts, in bouts held in Italy, the Netherlands, and in the United States. Awinongya fought in Ghana. Awinongya's boxing career moved from Europe to the United States in 1999, and he was unbeaten in eight straight bouts before losing an eight-round decision to Steve Cunningham. While Awinongya was never world champion, Awinongya became an internationally respected boxing trainer. He remains “happy to be in America” and has established a boxing gym for fighters from Ghana to come to the United States and train, where he feels they will not be taken advantage of by unscrupulous managers and promoters. Through that initiative after Ghanaian boxer Osumanu Adama moved from North Miami, Florida to Chicago, in early 2010 he signed with boxing manager Wasfi Tolaymat of the Chicago Fight Club and began to train under Awinongya. After training under him for less than 6 months, On December 17, 2010, at UIC Pavilion in Chicago, Adama won his first title, the vacant IBO international middleweight championship, the first middleweight titleholder ever from Ghana, by twelve round unanimous decision over contender Angel Hernandez. Awinongya currently trains amateur and professional fighters at the Chicago Sports and Fitness Club in Joliet, Illinois.

== Public speaking ==
Awinongya presents numerous seminars and speeches annually on topics including sportsmanship, leadership, personal health and wellness, staying in school, and staying away from drugs.

== Acting and Producing career ==
Joseph Awinongya played Paalo in the 2013 cable television movie 'Dreams' opposite Tommy Ford, Vicky Winans, Angie Stone, Dave Scott, Geoffrey Owens of the (Cosby Show), Terri Van Martin, Mel Jackson, Lisa Tucker, and Syesha Mercado of (American Idol). Joel Kapity, producer, director and co-screenwriter of 'Dreams' said, "one particular scene featuring Awinongya was so powerful, it moved everyone, including the camera crew, to tears." Awinonya served as executive producer of the 2022 documentary about his son Joseph Jr., an amateur boxer, entitled 'The Story of Jojo the Boxer'.

== Personal life ==
Awinongya married his wife Valerie in October 2004. They have three children, a son and two daughters. His son, Joseph Awinongya Jr., has won 15 amateur national boxing titles, including: the National Silver Gloves championship in 2017 and 2018; the St. Louis National Championship; the Junior Olympic National Championship; the Wisconsin National Championship; and the USA National Championship on multiple occasions. As of December 2022, Joseph 'JoJo' Awinonya Jr., currently trained by his father Joseph Awinonya Sr., is the number one ranked 145 pounds amateur in the United States among Junior Men ages 15–16 by USA Boxing Team USA online.
