= Wasfi Tolaymat =

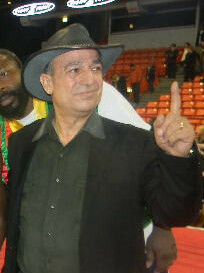
- New IBO International middleweight champion Osumanu Adama (center) with his manager Wasfi Tolaymat in the ring at UIC Pavilion in Chicago, December 2010
- Born: May 21, 1954 (age 72)
- Occupation: Manager

Wasfi Tolaymat (born May 21, 1954, in Syria) is a Chicago businessman and boxing manager who owns and operates the Chicago Fight Club Boxing Gym. He works with his wife, Chicago boxing promoter Cynthia Tolaymat [who owns Chicago Fight Clubs Promotion LLC and specializes in the promotion of boxing and mixed martial arts] to put on amateur and professional boxing shows in Chicago. A Jordanian immigrant, Wasfi Tolaymat is the owner of Sibley Supply, a store fixtures and restaurant equipment supply company in the Chicago area. He resides with his wife and five children in Chicago. Before immigrating to the United States in 1978, Tolaymat was an international bus driver covering routes between Syria, Iraq, Saudi Arabia, Kuwait, and Lebanon. He later opened a successful driving school and an Arab coffee shop in Chicago. He is also known for his appearances as 'The Cowboy' (the man in the cowboy hat) annually at the International Boxing Hall of Fame induction ceremonies weekend in Canestota, New York.

== The Man with the Sign, Selling Living History ==
Known for his signature hat, entrepreneur Wasfi Tolaymat was world famous in 1995 as 'the man with the sign' during O. J. Simpson's trial, who purchased all 31 pieces at auction, the contents of the hotel room O. J. Simpson stayed in at Chicago's O'Hare Plaza Hotel on June 13, 1994, for $4000 from the night he gashed his hand, including: the carpet, drapes, a holy bible, the ashtray, ice bucket, bed, dresser, the mirrors, chairs, a table, night tables, lamps, the pictures and more. He offered the lot for immediate resale during the trial for $1,000,000. Offers of $300,000 and $700,000 for the complete bric-a-brac collection of O. J. Simpson's Chicago O'Hare Plaza Hotel room items got turned down. O. J. Simpson checked into the O'Hare Plaza Hotel 6:15 A.M. Central Standard Time, checked out of the hotel 8:45 A.M. Central Standard Time, and caught a 9:41 A.M. flight back to Los Angeles. The hotel room where Simpson stayed in Chicago was later secured by the Chicago Police Department, where police discovered a broken glass in the sink. Blood was found in the sink near the glass and on the sheets and towels. Simpson told police he cut his left middle finger when he broke a glass in the hotel room and gashed himself upon learning what had happened to his wife Nicole Simpson. Famed pathologist Dr. Michael Baden testified the broken hotel room glass at the Plaza caused O. J. Simpson's left hand wounds.

== Manager Receives Second World Title Opportunity ==
In March 2012, Tolaymat's fighter, world ranked middleweight Osumanu Adama of Ghana, lost a close 12 round decision to Daniel Geale for the IBF version of the World Middleweight title at Hobart, Tasmania, Australia. On February 1, 2014, Osumanu Adama received another title fight opportunity and was stopped in the seventh round by Gennady Golovkin in a world title bout for Golovkin's WBA version of the World Middleweight title in Monte Carlo, Monaco.

== Champions Managed by Wasfi Tolaymat ==
- Osumanu Adama, USBA, IBO Intercontinental Middleweight Champion, Accra, Ghana

- Carl Davis (boxer) USBO Cruiserweight Champion, Chicago, Illinois
- David Estrada, World Boxing Council Fecombox Welterweight Champion Chicago, Illinois
- Angel Hernandez (boxer), NABA, NABF and IBA Americas Junior Middleweight Champion San Luis Potosi, Mexico
- *Lanardo Tyner, USA Mid American, USBO, WBA-NABA USA, WBC USNBC Welterweight Champion, Detroit, Michigan
