= Curtis Stevens (boxer) =

American boxer

Personal information
- Nicknames: Showtime; Cerebral Assassin
- Born: March 10, 1985 (age 41) Brownsville, Brooklyn, New York, U.S.
- Height: 5 ft 7 in (170 cm)
- Weight: Middleweight; Super middleweight; Light heavyweight

Boxing career
- Reach: 71 1/2 in (182 cm)
- Stance: Orthodox

Boxing record
- Total fights: 38
- Wins: 30
- Win by KO: 22
- Losses: 8

Curtis Delroy Stevens (born March 10, 1985) is an American former professional boxer. Stevens challenged for the WBA and IBO middleweight titles in 2013.

== Background ==
Born and raised by a single mother in Brownsville, Stevens began boxing at the age of five, later having his first amateur bout at the age of eight. He was trained by his uncle and Andre Rozier. Stevens holds the record for the third most knockouts in New York's amateur history. Early on in his career, Stevens was managed by Chris Gotti, before later joining with Lou DiBella.

== Professional career ==
Stevens made his professional debut on September 30, 2004, stopping Henry Dukes in the first round. He would remain undefeated over his next twelve fights until a loss to Marcos Primera, who stopped him in the eighth and final round on July 20, 2006. In a rematch against Primera later that year on November 15, Stevens avenged the loss with an eight-round unanimous decision (UD). A second loss came against Andre Dirrell on July 16, 2007, via ten-round UD.

On November 2, 2013, Stevens received his first world title opportunity when he faced WBA and IBO middleweight champion Gennady Golovkin. In what was an anticipated match-up between two formidable knockout artists, Stevens was knocked down in round two, and despite occasionally landing some hard shots on Golovkin thereafter, Stevens retired in his corner by the end of round eight.

Stevens was matched up against another fellow knockout artist, David Lemieux, on March 11, 2017. As was predicted, their fight immediately broke down into an all-out slugfest, but it was Lemieux who scored a brutal one-punch knockout in round three. Stevens was taken out of the ring in a stretcher and hospitalized overnight.

In his next fight, Stevens fought Carlos Jairo Cruz in Santiago de los Caballeros, Dominican Republic. Stevens stopped his opponent at the end of the fourth round and secured the win. However, his win was overshadowed by the home crowd which charged in the ring right after the announcement, attacking Stevens and his team, who managed to escape to the dressing room.

In his following fight, Stevens fought Wale Omotoso, his first fight after stepping down to 154 pounds. The change in weight didn't seem to help Stevens much, who got dropped three times and stopped by Omotoso. Stevens managed to beat the count of the last knockdown, but did not look steady on his feet, which prompted the referee to end the fight.

== Professional boxing record ==
37 fights	30 wins	7 losses
By knockout	22	4
By decision	8	3

No.	Result	Record	Opponent	Type	Round, time	Date	Location	Notes
37	Loss	30–7	Wale Omotoso	TKO	3 (10), 1:28	Aug 3, 2019	Barclays Center, Brooklyn, New York, USA	
36	Win	30–6	Carlos Jairo Cruz	RTD	4 (12), 3:00	Jul 21, 2018	Gimnasio Multiuso Nani Marrero, Santiago de los Caballeros, Dominican Republic	Won vacant IBA middleweight title
35	Loss	29–6	David Lemieux	KO	3 (12), 1:59	Mar 11, 2017	Turning Stone Resort Casino, Verona, New York, U.S.	Lost WBC Continental Americas middleweight title; For vacant WBO Inter-Continental middleweight title
34	Win	29–5	James de la Rosa	UD	10	Nov 19, 2016	T-Mobile Arena, Paradise, Nevada, U.S.	Retained WBC Continental Americas middleweight title
33	Win	28–5	Patrick Teixeira	TKO	2 (10), 1:04	May 7, 2016	T-Mobile Arena, Paradise, Nevada, U.S.	Won vacant WBC Continental Americas middleweight title
32	Loss	27–5	Hassan N'Dam N'Jikam	UD	12	Oct 1, 2014	Barker Hangar, Santa Monica, California, U.S.	
31	Win	27–4	Tureano Johnson	TKO	10 (10), 2:09	Apr 4, 2014	Liacouras Center, Philadelphia, Pennsylvania, U.S.	
30	Win	26–4	Patrick Majewski	TKO	1 (10), 0:46	Jan 24, 2014	Resorts Casino Hotel, Atlantic City, New Jersey, U.S.	
29	Loss	25–4	Gennadiy Golovkin	RTD	8 (12), 3:00	Nov 2, 2013	The Theater at Madison Square Garden, New York City, New York, U.S.	For WBA and IBO middleweight titles
28	Win	25–3	Saúl Román	KO	1 (10), 2:26	Aug 3, 2013	Mohegan Sun Arena, Montville, Connecticut, U.S.	Won vacant WBC-NABF middleweight title
27	Win	24–3	Derrick Findley	UD	8	Apr 20, 2013	The Theater at Madison Square Garden, New York City, New York, U.S.	
26	Win	23–3	Elvin Ayala	KO	1 (10), 1:10	Jan 19, 2013	Mohegan Sun Arena, Montville, Connecticut, U.S.	Won vacant WBC-NABF middleweight title
25	Win	22–3	Romaro Johnson	KO	1 (6), 2:16	Mar 24, 2012	Aviator Sports and Events Center, New York City, New York, U.S.	
24	Loss	21–3	Jesse Brinkley	UD	12	Jan 29, 2010	Grand Sierra Resort, Reno, Nevada, U.S.	For vacant WBC–USNBC super middleweight title
23	Win	21–2	Piotr Wilczewski	TKO	3 (8), 1:46	Jul 11, 2009	Prudential Center, Newark, New Jersey, U.S.	
22	Win	20–2	Don Mouton	UD	8	Apr 28, 2009	Russo's on the Bay, New York City, New York, U.S.	
21	Win	19–2	Ray Smith	TKO	1 (8), 0:48	Nov 7, 2008	Bally's, Atlantic City, New Jersey, U.S.	
20	Win	18–2	Thomas Reid	TKO	8 (8)	Mar 6, 2008	Grand Ballroom, New York City, New York, U.S.	
19	Loss	17–2	Andre Dirrell	UD	10	Jun 16, 2007	Mohegan Sun Arena, Montville, Connecticut, U.S.	
18	Win	17–1	Darnell Boone	UD	10	Mar 22, 2007	Hammerstein Ballroom, New York City, New York, U.S.	
17	Win	16–1	Jonathan Corn	TKO	2 (10), 2:34	Dec 14, 2006	Grand Ballroom, New York City, New York, U.S.	
16	Win	15–1	Dhafir Smith	UD	10	Dec 1, 2006	Vernon Downs, Vernon, New York, U.S.	Won vacant New York light heavyweight title
15	Win	14–1	Marcos Primera	UD	8	Nov 15, 2006	Grand Ballroom, New York City, New York, U.S.	
14	Loss	13–1	Marcos Primera	TKO	8 (10), 1:24	Jul 20, 2006	Grand Ballroom, New York City, New York, U.S.	For WBC Youth interim super middleweight title
13	Win	13–0	Eric Howard	TKO	6 (6), 2:15	Jun 10, 2006	Madison Square Garden, New York City, New York, U.S.	
12	Win	12–0	Carl Daniels	UD	8	Apr 20, 2006	Grand Ballroom, New York City, New York, U.S.	
11	Win	11–0	Jose Spearman	KO	2 (8), 2:59	Feb 16, 2006	Grand Ballroom, New York City, New York, U.S.	
10	Win	10–0	Kia Daniels	KO	1 (6), 0:44	Dec 15, 2005	Grand Ballroom, New York City, New York, U.S.	
9	Win	9–0	Corey Budd	TKO	1 (6), 2:32	Nov 4, 2005	Buffalo Run Casino, Miami, Oklahoma, U.S.	
8	Win	8–0	Jason Quick	TKO	2 (6), 1:55	Aug 4, 2005	Grand Ballroom, New York City, New York, U.S.	
7	Win	7–0	Shannon Miller	UD	6	Apr 28, 2005	Grand Ballroom, New York City, New York, U.S.	
6	Win	6–0	Raynard Darden	TKO	2 (6), 1:43	Mar 10, 2005	Grand Ballroom, New York City, New York, U.S.	
5	Win	5–0	Darin Johnson	KO	1 (6), 0:58	Feb 24, 2005	Hammerstein Ballroom, New York City, New York, U.S.	
4	Win	4–0	Anthony Konicek	TKO	1 (4), 0:35	Dec 11, 2004	Greensboro, North Carolina, U.S.	
3	Win	3–0	Wayne Cooper	TKO	2 (4), 2:19	Nov 18, 2004	Grand Ballroom, New York City, New York, U.S.	
2	Win	2–0	Anterio Vines	KO	1 (4), 0:30	Oct 21, 2004	Mohegan Sun Arena, Montville, Connecticut, U.S.	
1	Win	1–0	Henry Dukes	TKO	1 (4), 1:47	Sep 30, 2004	Grand Ballroom, New York City, New York, U.S.	

== Big Knockout Boxing record ==
1 fight	0 wins	0 losses
Draws	1	

No.	Result	Record	Opponent	Type	Round, time	Date	Location	Notes
1	Draw	0–0–1	(United States) Gabriel Rosado	MD	7	Apr 4, 2015	(United States) Mandalay Bay Events Center, Paradise, Nevada, U.S.	For BKB middleweight title; BKB debut

Sporting positions
Amateur boxing titles
Previous: DeAndrey Abron	U.S. light heavyweight champion 2002	Next: Andre Ward
Regional boxing titles
Vacant Title last held by David Telesco	New York light heavyweight champion December 1, 2006 – January 2010; Vacated	Vacant Title next held by Ronson Frank
Vacant Title last held by Patrick Majewski	NABF middleweight champion January 19, 2013 – May 2013; Vacated	Vacant Title next held by Himself
Vacant Title last held by Himself	NABF middleweight champion August 3, 2013 – November 2013; Vacated	Vacant Title next held by David Lemieux
Vacant Title last held by Robert Brant	WBC Continental Americas middleweight champion May 7, 2016 – March 11, 2017; Vacant after loss to Lemieux	Vacant
Minor world boxing titles
Vacant Title last held by Paul Mendez	IBA middleweight champion July 21, 2018 – present	Incumbent
