= Jesús Soto Karass =

Mexican boxer

Personal information
- Nicknames: El Renuente ("The Reluctant")
- Born: October 15, 1982 (age 44) Los Mochis, Sinaloa, Mexico
- Height: 5 ft 9 1/2 in (177 cm)
- Weight: Welterweight; Light middleweight

Boxing career
- Reach: 72 in (183 cm)
- Stance: Orthodox

Boxing record
- Total fights: 47
- Wins: 29
- Win by KO: 18
- Losses: 13
- Draws: 4
- No contests: 1

Jesús Soto Karass (born October 15, 1982) is a Mexican former professional boxer who competed from 2001 to 2018. who has challenged once for the WBA interim welterweight title in 2013. His older brother is José Luis Soto Karass, also a professional boxer.

== Professional career ==
Soto Karass holds wins over Michel Rosales, Saúl Román, Carson Jones, Vince Phillips, David Estrada, and Andre Berto. He is signed to Bob Arum's Top Rank. His fight with Gabriel Martínez was ruled a No Contest after an unintentional headbutt.

=== Soto Karass vs. Jones I, II ===
Jesús lost to Mike Jones on the undercard of Margarito vs. Pacquiao in Arlington, Texas on November 13, 2010. This fight was a huge controversy after the fight when the decision was ruled in favor of Mike Jones after a hard-fought battle which saw Mike Jones become exhausted after the second round due to an attempt at finishing the fight. A rematch for this fight happened on February 19, 2011, with Karass losing a convincing fight holding his side.

== Professional boxing record ==
47 fights	29 wins	13 losses
By knockout	18	5
By decision	11	8
Draws	4	
No contests	1	

No.	Result	Record	Opponent	Type	Round, time	Date	Location	Notes
47	Win	29–13–4 (1)	Neeco Macias	MD	10	Nov 8, 2018	Fantasy Springs Resort Casino, Indio, California, U.S.	
46	Loss	28–13–4 (1)	Juan Carlos Abreu	KO	8 (10), 1:07	Nov 2, 2017	Casino Del Sol, Tucson, Arizona, U.S.	
45	Loss	28–12–4 (1)	Mauricio Herrera	MD	10	Aug 4, 2017	Fantasy Springs Resort Casino, Indio, California, U.S.	
44	Loss	28–11–4 (1)	Yoshihiro Kamegai	RTD	8 (10), 3:00	Sep 10, 2016	The Forum, Inglewood, California, U.S.	
43	Draw	28–10–4 (1)	Yoshihiro Kamegai	SD	10	Apr 15, 2016	Belasco Theater, Los Angeles, California, U.S.	
42	Loss	28–10–3 (1)	Devon Alexander	UD	10	Jun 21, 2014	StubHub Center, Carson, California, U.S.	
41	Loss	28–9–3 (1)	Keith Thurman	TKO	9 (12), 2:21	Dec 14, 2013	Alamodome, San Antonio, Texas, U.S.	For WBA interim welterweight title
40	Win	28–8–3 (1)	Andre Berto	TKO	12 (12), 0:48	Jul 27, 2013	AT&T Center, San Antonio, Texas, U.S.	Won vacant WBC-NABF welterweight title
39	Win	27–8–3 (1)	Selçuk Aydın	MD	10	Jan 26, 2013	The Joint, Paradise, Nevada, U.S.	
38	Loss	26–8–3 (1)	Marcos Maidana	TKO	8 (12), 0:43	Sep 15, 2012	MGM Grand Garden Arena, Paradise, Nevada, U.S.	For vacant WBA International welterweight title
37	Win	26–7–3 (1)	Euri González	TKO	5 (10), 1:50	Jul 7, 2012	OC Fair & Event Center, Costa Mesa, California, U.S.	
36	Win	25–7–3 (1)	Said El Harrak	SD	10	May 26, 2012	Casino Del Sol, Tucson, Arizona, U.S.	
35	Loss	24–7–3 (1)	Gabriel Rosado	TKO	5 (10), 2:06	Jan 21, 2012	Asylum Arena, Philadelphia, Pennsylvania, U.S.	
34	Loss	24–6–3 (1)	Mike Jones	UD	12	Feb 19, 2011	Mandalay Bay Events Center, Paradise, Nevada, U.S.	For WBA–NABA, WBO–NABO, and WBC Continental Americas welterweight titles
33	Loss	24–5–3 (1)	Mike Jones	MD	10	Nov 13, 2010	Cowboys Stadium, Arlington, Texas, U.S.	For WBA–NABA, WBO–NABO, and vacant WBC Continental Americas welterweight titles
32	NC	24–4–3 (1)	Gabriel Martínez	NC	2 (10), 0:01	May 29, 2010	UIC Pavilion, Chicago, Illinois U.S.	NC after Martínez was cut from an accidental head clash
31	Loss	24–4–3	Alfonso Gómez	TD	6 (10), 2:14	Nov 14, 2009	MGM Grand Garden Arena, Paradise, Nevada, U.S.	For vacant WBC Continental Americas welterweight title; Unanimous TD after Gómez was cut from an accidental head clash
30	Win	24–3–3	Edvan Dos Santos Barros	UD	10	Aug 29, 2009	QuikTrip Park, Grand Prairie, Texas, U.S.	
29	Win	23–3–3	Carson Jones	UD	10	Feb 6, 2009	Activity Center, Maywood, California, U.S.	
28	Win	22–3–3	Hicklet Lau	TKO	2 (10), 1:59	Nov 28, 2008	Santa Ana Star Center, Rio Rancho, New Mexico, U.S.	
27	Win	21–3–3	David Estrada	TKO	8 (12), 1:03	Jul 25, 2008	The Joint, Paradise, Nevada, U.S.	Won vacant WBC-NABF welterweight title
26	Win	20–3–3	Chris Smith	UD	10	Apr 11, 2008	Tropicana Casino & Resort, Atlantic City, New Jersey, U.S.	Retained WBC Continental Americas welterweight title
25	Win	19–3–3	Germaine Sanders	UD	10	Jan 18, 2008	Jacob Brown Auditorium, Brownsville, Texas, U.S.	
24	Win	18–3–3	Juan Manuel Buendia	UD	10	Nov 15, 2007	Sovereign Center, Reading, Pennsylvania, U.S.	
23	Win	17–3–3	Jose Antonio Ojeda	TKO	3 (10), 1:30	Aug 17, 2007	County Coliseum, El Paso, Texas, U.S.	Retained WBC Continental Americas welterweight title
22	Draw	16–3–3	Gilbert Venegas	SD	12	May 25, 2007	Isleta Resort & Casino, Albuquerque, New Mexico, U.S.	Retained WBC Continental Americas welterweight title
21	Win	16–3–2	Luciano Perez	RTD	7 (12), 0:10	Dec 15, 2006	Grand Plaza Hotel, Houston, Texas, U.S.	Retained WBC Continental Americas welterweight title
20	Win	15–3–2	Michel Rosales	TKO	11 (12), 2:21	Oct 20, 2006	Cicero Stadium, Cicero, Illinois, U.S.	Retained WBC Continental Americas welterweight title
19	Win	14–3–2	Vince Phillips	RTD	9 (12), 3:00	Jun 2, 2006	Envy Nightclub, Tucson, Arizona, U.S.	Won WBC Continental Americas welterweight title
18	Win	13–3–2	Fernando Mena	UD	8	Feb 18, 2006	The Aladdin, Paradise, Nevada, U.S.	
17	Win	12–3–2	Juan Yoani Cervantes	UD	6	Dec 10, 2005	Activity Center, Maywood, California, U.S.	
16	Draw	11–3–2	Manuel Gomez	MD	10	May 6, 2005	Fort McDowell Casino, Fountain Hills, Arizona, U.S.	
15	Loss	11–3–1	Yuri Foreman	UD	8	Feb 24, 2005	Hammerstein Ballroom, New York City, New York, U.S.	
14	Loss	11–2–1	Freddy Hernández	UD	10	Jul 13, 2004	Playboy Mansion, Beverly Hills, California, U.S.	
13	Loss	11–1–1	Nurhan Süleymanoğlu	UD	12	Jan 15, 2004	Arena Theatre, Houston, Texas, U.S.	For vacant WBA Fedecentro super welterweight title
12	Win	11–0–1	Oscar Delgado	TKO	7 (8)	Jul 17, 2003	Grand Arena, City of Industry, California, U.S.	
11	Win	10–0–1	Jaime Morales	UD	8	May 5, 2003	Municipal Memorial Auditorium, Shreveport, Louisiana, U.S.	
10	Draw	9–0–1	Cristian Solano	PTS	10	Jan 18, 2003	Estadio Emilio Ibarra Almada, Los Mochis, Mexico	
9	Win	9–0	Marco Antonio Garcia	TKO	6	Jul 19, 2002	Los Mochis, Mexico	
8	Win	8–0	Saúl Román	KO	1 (4)	Apr 20, 2002	Astroleón Salon de Eventos, Los Mochis, Mexico	
7	Win	7–0	Eric Rodriguez	TKO	6 (6)	Feb 22, 2002	Auditorio Benito Juarez, Los Mochis, Mexico	
6	Win	6–0	Macial Higuera	KO	1	Dec 21, 2001	Los Mochis, Mexico	
5	Win	5–0	Francisco Martinez	TKO	1 (4)	Dec 7, 2001	Mexico	
4	Win	4–0	Jose Orozco	TKO	4 (4)	Nov 3, 2001	Los Mochis, Mexico	
3	Win	3–0	Joel Gonzalez	TKO	1 (4)	Sep 14, 2001	Forum del Mayo, Navojoa, Mexico	
2	Win	2–0	Raymundo Verdugo	TKO	1 (4)	Aug 1, 2001	Mexico	
1	Win	1–0	Edgar Inzunza	TKO	1 (4)	Jun 29, 2001	Auditorio Benito Juarez, Los Mochis, Mexico	

== Exhibition boxing record ==
1 fight	0 wins	0 losses
Non-scored	1	

No.	Result	Record	Opponent	Type	Round, time	Date	Location	Notes
1	—N/a	0–0 (1)	(Mexico) Marco Antonio Barrera	—N/a	6	Jun 11, 2021	(United States) Pico Rivera Sports Arena, Pico Rivera, California, U.S.	Non-scored bout

== Big Knockout Boxing record ==
2 fights	1 win	1 loss
By decision	1	1

No.	Result	Record	Opponent	Type	Round, time	Date	Location	Notes
2	Loss	1–1	(Mexico) Adrían Granados	SD	5	Jun 27, 2015	(United States) Mandalay Bay Events Center, Paradise, Nevada, U.S.	
1	Win	1–0	(United States) Ed Paredes	UD	5	Apr 4 2015	(United States) Mandalay Bay Events Center, Paradise, Nevada, U.S.	

== See also ==
- Notable boxing families

Sporting positions
Regional boxing titles
Preceded by Vince Phillips	WBC Continental Americas welterweight champion June 2, 2006 – July 2008; Vacated	Vacant Title next held by Orlando Lora
Vacant Title last held by Andre Berto	NABF welterweight champion July 25, 2008 – January 2009; Vacated	Vacant Title next held by Canelo Álvarez
Vacant Title last held by Antonin Décarie	NABF welterweight champion July 27 – November 3, 2013; Stripped	Vacant Title next held by Paulie Malignaggi
