= Gabriel Rosado =

American boxer (born 1986)

Personal information
- Nickname: King
- Born: January 13, 1986 (age 40) Philadelphia, Pennsylvania, U.S.
- Height: 5 ft 11 1/2 in (182 cm)
- Weight: Light middleweight; Middleweight; Super middleweight

Boxing career
- Reach: 71 1/2 in (182 cm)
- Stance: Orthodox

Boxing record
- Total fights: 47
- Wins: 28
- Win by KO: 16
- Losses: 17
- Draws: 1
- No contests: 1

Gabriel Rosado (born January 14, 1986) is an American professional boxer. He has challenged twice for a middleweight world title in 2013.

== Early life ==
Hailing from Philadelphia, Pennsylvania, Rosado is part of the city's large Puerto Rican community.

== Amateur career ==
Rosado's amateur record was 8–3.

== Professional career ==
Rosado started his career in the light middleweight division. He won his first regional title on February 26, 2011, with a 12th round technical knockout over fellow contender Jamaal Davis to win the interim WBA-NABA light middleweight title. Later that year, he won the Pennsylvania state light middleweight title after a 10th round unanimous decision over contender Keenan Collins. On June 1, 2012, Rosado faced Sechew Powell, stopping the future world title challenger in the 9th round to win the vacant WBO Inter-Continental light middleweight title.

After amassing a record of 21–5 after 26 professional fights, he challenged undefeated WBA and IBO middleweight champion Gennady Golovkin on January 19, 2013, at The Theater at Madison Square Garden, New York City. Golovkin dominated the fight, inflicting Rosado with a nasty cut near his left eye in the second round. Rosado also bled from the nose as he was hammered by right hands and powerful jabs from his opponent. His trainer Billy Briscoe put a stop to the fight in the seventh round.

Two fights later, on October 26, 2013, Rosado challenged undefeated Peter Quillin for his WBO middleweight title. A nasty cut opened on the left eyelid of Rosado in the tenth round, causing a doctor stoppage and giving Quillin the technical knockout victory. Despite many observers believing the fight to have been competitive, the judges had scored the bout 87–83, 89–81 and 90–80 in favor of Quillin at the time of the stoppage. Rosado yelled down at the Showtime commentary team that the doctor's stoppage was "bullshit" as soon as the fight was stopped, and told Jim Gray that he wanted a rematch; a rematch ultimately never materialized.

Since his two unsuccessful challenges for a world title in 2013, Rosado picked up notable wins against former IBF welterweight champion Joshua Clottey in 2015, and knocking out highly-rated undefeated prospect Bektemir Melikuziev in 2021, winning the WBA Continental Americas and WBO International super middleweight titles.

On the 28th of April 2023, Rosado announced his retirement.

Rosado returned to the ring in 2025, defeating Vaughn Alexander by unanimous decision on October 18 in Brooklyn, and Crispulo Javier Andino by knockout in the first round on August 2 in Long Beach, CA.

On March 7, 2026, Rosado fought Ty Mitchell in an MF–professional boxing match headlining MF Duel 2, for the MF Pro light heavyweight title at the Vaillant Live in Derby, England. Mitchell defeated Rosado via unanimous decision.

== Temporary move to Big Knockout Boxing ==
Despite being shut out in his fight with Jermell Charlo on January 25, 2014, Rosado was offered the chance to face middleweight and super middleweight contender Brian Vera in a title match for the inaugural Big Knockout Boxing (BKB) middleweight championship. The bout took place on August 16, 2014. Rosado defeated Vera by sixth-round TKO and won the title.

== Professional boxing record ==
47 fights	28 wins	17 losses
By knockout	16	4
By decision	12	13
Draws	1	
No contests	1	

No.	Result	Record	Opponent	Type	Round, time	Date	Location	Notes
47	Win	28–17–1 (1)	Vaughn Alexander	UD	8	Oct 18, 2025	Barclays Center, New York City, New York, U.S.	
46	Win	27–17–1 (1)	Crispulo Javier Andino	KO	1 (8), 2:30	Aug 2, 2025	Thunder Studios, Long Beach, California, U.S.	
45	Loss	26–17–1 (1)	Bektemir Melikuziev	UD	10	Apr 22, 2023	T-Mobile Arena, Paradise, Nevada, U.S.	For vacant WBA Inter-Continental super middleweight title
44	Loss	26–16–1 (1)	Ali Akhmedov	UD	10	Sep 17, 2022	T-Mobile Arena, Paradise, Nevada, U.S.	For vacant WBC Silver and IBF-USBA super middleweight titles
43	Loss	26–15–1 (1)	Shane Mosley Jr.	MD	10	Apr 9, 2022	Alamodome, San Antonio, Texas, U.S.	For WBA Continental Americas super middleweight title
42	Loss	26–14–1 (1)	Jaime Munguia	UD	12	Nov 13, 2021	Honda Center, Anaheim, California, U.S.	For WBO Inter-Continental middleweight title
41	Win	26–13–1 (1)	Bektemir Melikuziev	KO	3 (12), 1:21	Jun 19, 2021	Don Haskins Center, El Paso, Texas, U.S.	Won WBA Continental Americas and vacant WBO International super middleweight titles
40	Loss	25–13–1 (1)	Daniel Jacobs	SD	12	Nov 27, 2020	Hard Rock Live, Hollywood, Florida, U.S.	
39	Win	25–12–1 (1)	Humberto Gutierrez Ochoa	UD	10	Dec 20, 2019	Talking Stick Resort Arena, Phoenix, Arizona, U.S.	
38	Loss	24–12–1 (1)	Maciej Sulęcki	UD	10	Mar 15, 2019	Liacouras Center, Philadelphia, Pennsylvania, U.S.	For vacant WBO International middleweight title
37	Draw	24–11–1 (1)	Luís Arias	SD	12	Nov 17, 2018	Kansas Star Arena, Mulvane, Kansas, U.S.	For vacant WBO Latino middleweight title
36	Win	24–11 (1)	Glen Tapia	TKO	6 (10), 1:15	Oct 19, 2017	Monte Carlo Resort and Casino, Paradise, Nevada, U.S.	
35	Loss	23–11 (1)	Martin Murray	MD	12	Apr 22, 2017	Echo Arena, Liverpool, England	For vacant WBA Inter-Continental middleweight title
34	Loss	23–10 (1)	Willie Monroe Jr.	UD	12	Sep 17, 2016	AT&T Stadium, Arlington, Texas, U.S.	For vacant WBO Inter-Continental middleweight title
33	Win	23–9 (1)	Antonio Gutierrez	UD	10	Jun 4, 2016	StubHub Center, Carson, California, U.S.	
32	Win	22–9 (1)	Joshua Clottey	UD	10	Dec 19, 2015	Turning Stone Resort Casino, Verona, New York, U.S.	
31	Loss	21–9 (1)	David Lemieux	TKO	10 (12), 1:45	Dec 6, 2014	Barclays Center, New York City, New York, U.S.	For NABF middleweight title
30	Loss	21–8 (1)	Jermell Charlo	UD	10	Jan 25, 2014	D.C. Armory, Washington, D.C., U.S.	
29	Loss	21–7 (1)	Peter Quillin	TKO	10 (12), 0:40	Oct 26, 2013	Boardwalk Hall, Atlantic City, New Jersey, U.S.	For WBO middleweight title
28	NC	21–6 (1)	J'Leon Love	SD	10	May 4, 2013	MGM Grand Garden Arena, Paradise, Nevada, U.S.	Vacant NABF middleweight title at stake; Originally an SD win for Love, later ruled an NC after he failed a drug test
27	Loss	21–6	Gennady Golovkin	TKO	7 (12), 2:46	Jan 19, 2013	The Theater at Madison Square Garden, New York City, New York, U.S.	For WBA and IBO middleweight titles
26	Win	21–5	Charles Whittaker	TKO	10 (12), 1:51	Sep 21, 2012	Sands Casino Resort, Bethlehem, Pennsylvania, U.S.	
25	Win	20–5	Sechew Powell	TKO	9 (12), 2:43	Jun 1, 2012	Sands Casino Resort, Bethlehem, Pennsylvania, U.S.	Won vacant WBO Inter-Continental light middleweight title
24	Win	19–5	Jesús Soto Karass	TKO	5 (10), 2:06	Jan 21, 2012	Asylum Arena, Philadelphia, Pennsylvania, U.S.	
23	Win	18–5	Keenan Collins	UD	10	Sep 9, 2011	Asylum Arena, Philadelphia, Pennsylvania, U.S.	Won vacant Pennsylvania light middleweight title
22	Win	17–5	Ayi Bruce	TKO	5 (8), 2:56	Jul 15, 2011	Bally's, Atlantic City, New Jersey, U.S.	
21	Win	16–5	Jamaal Davis	TKO	12 (12), 1:01	Feb 26, 2011	Bally's, Atlantic City, New Jersey, U.S.	Won vacant WBA–NABA interim light middleweight title
20	Win	15–5	Jose Medina	UD	8	Dec 9, 2010	Prudential Center, Newark, New Jersey, U.S.	
19	Loss	14–5	Derek Ennis	MD	12	Jul 30, 2010	The Arena, Philadelphia, Pennsylvania, U.S.	For USBA light middleweight title
18	Win	14–4	Saúl Román	SD	10	Feb 27, 2010	Bally's, Atlantic City, New Jersey, U.S.	
17	Win	13–4	Latif Mundy	TKO	7 (8), 1:53	Nov 7, 2009	Bally's, Atlantic City, New Jersey, U.S.	
16	Loss	12–4	Alfredo Angulo	TKO	2 (10), 2:13	Aug 7, 2009	Star of the Desert Arena, Primm, Nevada, U.S.	
15	Win	12–3	Kassim Ouma	SD	10	Apr 24, 2009	Prudential Center, Newark, New Jersey, U.S.	
14	Win	11–3	Ariel Espinal	TKO	5 (6)	Apr 4, 2009	High School, Philadelphia, Pennsylvania, U.S.	
13	Loss	10–3	Fernando Guerrero	UD	8	Feb 6, 2009	Wicomico Youth and Civic Center, Salisbury, Maryland, U.S.	
12	Win	10–2	James Moore	UD	8	Jun 4, 2008	Aviator Sports and Events Center, New York City, New York, U.S.	
11	Win	9–2	Mustafah Johnson	UD	6	May 9, 2008	Alhambra Arena, Philadelphia, Pennsylvania, U.S.	
10	Win	8–2	Joshua Onyango	TKO	3 (6), 0:55	Apr 16, 2008	Hammerstein Ballroom, New York City, New York, U.S.	
9	Win	7–2	Daniel Hicks	TKO	5 (6), 0:57	Aug 3, 2007	National Guard Armory, Philadelphia, Pennsylvania, U.S.	
8	Loss	6–2	Joshua Onyango	UD	6	Mar 23, 2007	National Guard Armory, Philadelphia, Pennsylvania, U.S.	
7	Win	6–1	Chris Overbey	TKO	1 (6), 1:02	Jan 26, 2007	National Guard Armory, Philadelphia, Pennsylvania, U.S.	
6	Loss	5–1	Chris Gray	UD	6	Oct 20, 2006	The Blue Horizon, Philadelphia, Pennsylvania, U.S.	
5	Win	5–0	Mustafah Johnson	MD	4	Aug 4, 2006	National Guard Armory, Philadelphia, Pennsylvania, U.S.	
4	Win	4–0	Cecil Yost	TKO	4 (4), 2:09	May 5, 2006	New Alhambra Arena, Philadelphia, Pennsylvania, U.S.	
3	Win	3–0	Anthony Abrams	UD	4	Mar 17, 2006	National Guard Armory, Philadelphia, Pennsylvania, U.S.	
2	Win	2–0	Michael Rayner	KO	3 (4), 1:23	Feb 11, 2006	First District Plaza, Philadelphia, Pennsylvania, U.S.	
1	Win	1–0	Phil Hicklin	TKO	1 (4), 2:07	Jan 13, 2006	National Guard Armory, Philadelphia, Pennsylvania, U.S.	

== Big Knockout Boxing record ==
2 fights	1 win	0 losses
By knockout	1	0
Draws	1	

No.	Result	Record	Opponent	Type	Round, time	Date	Location	Notes
2	Draw	1–0–1	(United States) Curtis Stevens	MD	7	Apr 4, 2015	(United States) Mandalay Bay Events Center, Paradise, Nevada, U.S.	Retained BKB middleweight title
1	Win	1–0	(United States) Brian Vera	TKO	6 (7), 1:59	Aug 16, 2014	(United States) Mandalay Bay Events Center, Paradise, Nevada, U.S.	Won vacant BKB middleweight title

== MF–Professional boxing record ==
1 fight	0 wins	1 loss
By decision	0	1

No.	Result	Record	Opponent	Type	Round, time	Date	Location	Notes
1	Loss	0–1	Ty Mitchell	UD	6	Mar 7, 2026	Vaillant Live, Derby, England	For MF Pro light heavyweight title

== In other media ==
Rosado appeared in the boxing film Creed (2015), starring Michael B. Jordan and Sylvester Stallone.

Sporting positions
Regional boxing titles
New title	WBA–NABA light middleweight champion Interim title February 26, 2011 – June 2012; Vacated	Vacant Title next held by John Thompson
Vacant Title last held by Derek Ennis	Pennsylvania light middleweight champion September 9, 2011 – January 2013; Vacated	Vacant Title next held by Tyrone Brunson
Vacant Title last held by Salim Larbi	WBO Inter-Continental light middleweight champion June 1, 2012 – September 2012; Vacated	Vacant Title next held by Brian Rose
Preceded by Bektemir Melikuziev	WBA Continental Americas super middleweight Champion; June 19, 2021 – present	Incumbent
N/A	WBO International super middleweight champion June 19, 2021 – present	Incumbent
Big Knockout Boxing
Inaugural Champion	BKB middleweight champion August 16, 2014 – Current	Succeeded by Incumbent
