= Yoshihiro Kamegai =

Japanese boxer (born 1982)

Personal information
- Nickname: Maestrito
- Nationality: Japanese
- Born: Yoshihiro Kamegai (亀海喜寛); November 12, 1982 (age 43) Sapporo, Hokkaido, Japan
- Height: 5 ft 9 in (175 cm)
- Weight: Light welterweight; Welterweight; Light middleweight; Middleweight

Boxing career
- Reach: 71 in (180 cm)
- Stance: Orthodox

Boxing record
- Total fights: 34
- Wins: 27
- Win by KO: 24
- Losses: 5
- Draws: 2

Yoshihiro Kamegai (亀海喜寛 Kamegai Yoshihiro, born November 12, 1982) is a Japanese former professional boxer who competed from 2005 to 2018. affiliated with the Teiken Boxing Gym and Golden Boy Promotions. He secured the Japanese super lightweight title in 2010 as the 33rd champion and defended it once before vacating it. He made his U.S. boxing debut in 2011, securing a victory over Hector Munoz at the MGM Grand. He became the 38th OPBF welterweight champion, securing the title in 2013 before vacating it after one defense. He fought Miguel Cotto for the vacant WBO light middleweight world title.

== Professional career ==
=== Kamegai vs. Pérez ===
Kamegai fought Johan Pérez for the WBA International welterweight title, and was dealt his first professional defeat via unanimous decision. The close range brawling style of Kamegai just wasn't in tune to fight against the moving style of Perez.

=== OPBF Welterweight Title ===
Kamegai fought Tim Hunt for the vacant OPBF Welterweight Title, securing the title via technical knockout in the fifth round. He later defended the title against Jung Hoon Yang Kamegai later vacated the title as his focused shifted towards the United States.

=== Kamegai vs. Guerrero ===
Kamegai fought Robert Guerrero on June 21, 2014. The fight was a brutal back and forth slug-fest with Guererro hardly able open his left eye toward the end of the fight. Nevertheless, Guerrero scored a unanimous 12-round decision over Kamegai with official scores of 116-112, 117-111, and 117-111, giving him his second loss.

=== Kamegai vs. Gomez ===
Kamegai fought Alfonso Gómez in 2015. They fought head to head for the match with Gomez ahead on points, making an effective usage of his jab versus a determined Kamegai who kept absorbing punches and going forward, seeking Gomez' liver. An accidental headbutt mid-fight cost Gomez a point deduction. However, despite Kamegai's persistent pressure, Gomez was able to work around the ring more successfully, resulting in Kamegai losing by unanimous decision.

=== Kamegai vs. Soto Karass I ===
Kamegai fought Jesus Soto Karass for the first time on April 15, 2016. They fought toe to toe in a close range war exchanging punches non-stop, with neither fighter backing off for the entirety of the match. Though Soto Karass was throwing a more sheer number of punches, Kamegai's were landing more precisely, making the punches between the two virtually even, with little distinguishment of power of their blows. The fight eventually ended in a draw by a split decision from the judges.

=== Kamegai vs. Soto Karass II ===
A rematch between Kamegai and Soto Karass was held shortly after the first, on September 10, 2016. In this match Kamegai was able to damage Soto Karass early with a left body blow from the side. The rest of the fight played out similarly to the first, with each fighter duking it out in a full-fledged brawl. Kamegai's punches began to outland Soto Karass and started to gain leverage in the fight, pushing Soto Karass back. Kamegai landed flush shots for the remainder of the match until Soto Karass retired in the corner, which was labeled as a TKO.

=== Kamegai vs. Cotto ===
On May 24, it was announced a deal was made for a fight between Cotto and Kamegai to take place on August 26, 2017 at the StubHub Center in Carson, California live on HBO.

== Professional boxing record ==
34 fights	27 wins	5 losses
By knockout	24	0
By decision	3	5
Draws	2	

No.	Result	Record	Opponent	Type	Round, time	Date	Location	Notes
34	Loss	27–5–2	Greg Vendetti	UD	10	Aug 17, 2018	Fantasy Springs Resort Casino, Indio, California, U.S.	
33	Loss	27–4–2	Miguel Cotto	UD	12	Aug 26, 2017	StubHub Center, Carson, California, U.S.	For vacant WBO junior middleweight title
32	Win	27–3–2	Jesus Soto Karass	RTD	8 (10), 3:00	Sep 10, 2016	The Forum, Inglewood, California, U.S.	
31	Draw	26–3–2	Jesus Soto Karass	SD	10	Apr 15, 2016	Belasco Theater, Los Angeles, California, U.S.	
30	Win	26–3–1	Nelson Gulpe	KO	3 (10), 3:09	Oct 3, 2015	Korakuen Hall, Tokyo, Japan	
29	Loss	25–3–1	Alfonso Gómez	UD	10	Mar 20, 2015	Fantasy Springs Resort Casino, Indio, California, U.S.	
28	Win	25–2–1	Oscar Godoy	TKO	4 (8), 1:58	Dec 13, 2014	MGM Grand Garden Arena, Paradise, Nevada, U.S.	
27	Loss	24–2–1	Robert Guerrero	UD	12	Jun 21, 2014	StubHub Center, Carson, California, U.S.	
26	Win	24–1–1	Jung Hoon Yang	KO	4 (12), 2:25	Apr 5, 2014	Korakuen Hall, Tokyo, Japan	Retained OPBF welterweight title
25	Win	23–1–1	Tim Hunt	TKO	5 (12), 0:53	Dec 7, 2013	Korakuen Hall, Tokyo, Japan	Won vacant OPBF welterweight title
24	Loss	22–1–1	Johan Perez	UD	10	Jun 8, 2013	Home Depot Center, Carson, California, U.S.	For vacant WBA International welterweight title
23	Win	22–0–1	José Alberto Leal	KO	2 (10), 1:59	Feb 2, 2013	Korakuen Hall, Tokyo, Japan	
22	Draw	21–0–1	Jorge Silva	SD	10	Oct 6, 2012	Memorial Auditorium, Sacramento, California, U.S.	
21	Win	21–0	Alfredo Chavez	TKO	9 (10), 1:47	Apr 16, 2012	Korakuen Hall, Tokyo, Japan	
20	Win	20–0	Eusebio Baluarte	UD	8	Dec 3, 2011	Korakuen Hall, Tokyo, Japan	
19	Win	19–0	Hector Munoz	TKO	6 (10), 1:39	Oct 1, 2011	Marquee Ballroom, MGM Grand, Paradise, Nevada, U.S.	
18	Win	18–0	Joel Dela Cruz	KO	2 (10), 2:05	Jun 4, 2011	Korakuen Hall, Tokyo, Japan	
17	Win	17–0	José Alfaro	KO	6 (10), 2:36	Oct 24, 2010	Ryōgoku Kokugikan, Tokyo, Japan	
16	Win	16–0	Tomoyuki Shiotani	TKO	4 (10), 1:45	Jul 20, 2010	Korakuen Hall, Tokyo, Japan	Retained Japanese super lightweight title
15	Win	15–0	Yosukezan Onodera	TKO	9 (10), 2:05	Apr 12, 2010	Korakuen Hall, Tokyo, Japan	Won Japanese super lightweight title
14	Win	14–0	JR Sollano	KO	2 (8), 0:43	Dec 5, 2009	Korakuen Hall, Tokyo, Japan	
13	Win	13–0	Daiki Koide	TKO	7 (8), 2:48	Oct 11, 2009	Korakuen Hall, Tokyo, Japan	
12	Win	12–0	Heri Andriyanto	UD	8	Jun 6, 2009	Korakuen Hall, Tokyo, Japan	
11	Win	11–0	Glen Masicampo	KO	3 (8), 0:44	Mar 21, 2009	Korakuen Hall, Tokyo, Japan	
10	Win	10–0	Hirobumi Ito	TKO	6 (8), 1:58	Dec 20, 2008	Korakuen Hall, Tokyo, Japan	
9	Win	9–0	Chalermkiet Boonyaem	KO	2 (8), 2:16	Aug 16, 2008	Korakuen Hall, Tokyo, Japan	
8	Win	8–0	Monte Carlos	KO	3 (8), 2:25	Apr 19, 2008	Korakuen Hall, Tokyo, Japan	
7	Win	7–0	Daisuke Hata	UD	10	Dec 1, 2007	Korakuen Hall, Tokyo, Japan	
6	Win	6–0	Yasuhiro Kondo	KO	4 (10), 2:59	Aug 4, 2007	Korakuen Hall, Tokyo, Japan	
5	Win	5–0	Akinori Suzuki	TKO	3 (8), 1:59	Mar 3, 2007	Korakuen Hall, Tokyo, Japan	
4	Win	4–0	Mitsuru Okubo	RTD	6 (8), 3:00	Oct 7, 2006	Korakuen Hall, Tokyo, Japan	
3	Win	3–0	Ken Ito	TKO	4 (6), 0:55	Jul 1, 2006	Korakuen Hall, Tokyo, Japan	
2	Win	2–0	Theerawat Yoohanngoh	TKO	3 (6), 2:05	Feb 18, 2006	Korakuen Hall, Tokyo, Japan	
1	Win	1–0	Chainarong Sithsaithong	TKO	1 (6), 0:40	Nov 5, 2005	Korakuen Hall, Tokyo, Japan	Professional debut
