= Ángel Hernández (boxer) =

Mexican boxer (born 1975)

José Ángel Hernández
Personal information
- Nickname: El Toro
- Born: José Ángel Hernández; 17 September 1975 (age 50) San Luis Potosi, San Luis Potosí, Mexico
- Height: 1.73 m (5 ft 8 in)
- Weight: Middleweight

Boxing career
- Reach: 183 cm (72 in)
- Stance: Orthodox

Boxing record
- Total fights: 41
- Wins: 30
- Win by KO: 17
- Losses: 11
- Draws: 0
- No contests: 0

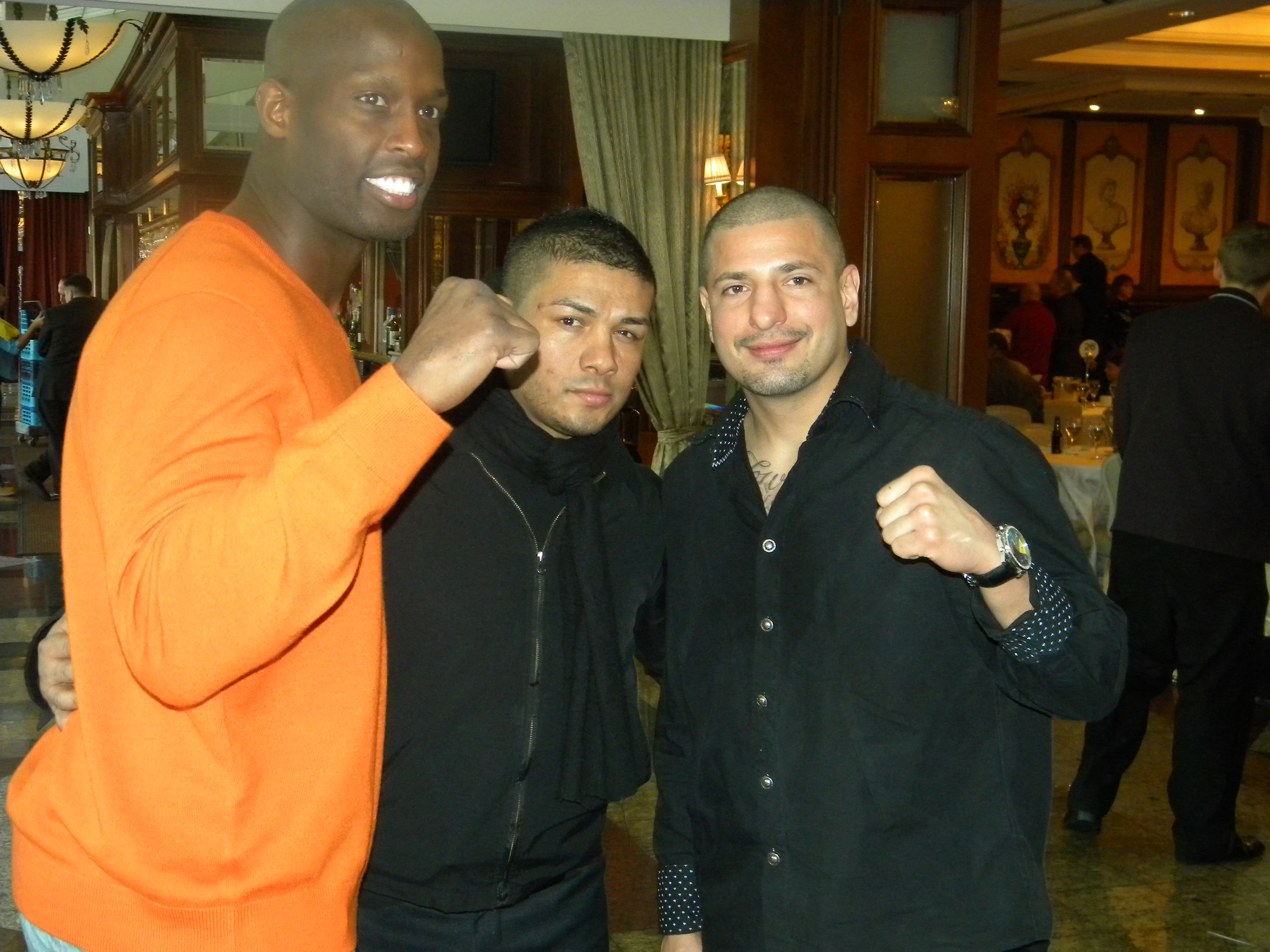
Carl Davis, Angel Hernandez and David Estrada at a benefit for injured and retired boxers in 2010

José Ángel Hernández (born 17 September 1975) is a Mexican professional boxer. He has held the NABA, NABF and International Boxing Association Americas light middleweight titles.

== Professional career ==
Hernandez made his professional boxing debut at age 16 on March 29, 1996 with a first-round KO victory over David Pearson. He won his first eight fights by knockout.

Hernandez was 13-0 before being defeated by Puerto Rican boxer Wilfredo Rivera.

On May 13, 2000, Hernandez won the IBA Americas Jr. Middleweight Title with a twelve-round split decision over Dominican Republic's Julio Cesar De la Cruz.

On July 28, 2002, Hernandez defeated Larry Marks for the vacant NABF light middleweight title by split decision.

=== Hernandez vs. Ouma ===
On May 30, 2003, Kassim Ouma defeated 'El Toro' by split decision in an IBF Light Middleweight Title Eliminator for the vacant USBA light middleweight title.

=== Hernandez vs. Winky Wright ===
On November 8, 2003, Hernandez (26-4) lost a 12-round unanimous decision to previous IBF light middleweight champion Winky Wright, (45-3). Winky became the new IBF light middleweight champion in the co-event fight at the Mandalay Bay Resort and Casino, Las Vegas.

=== Hernandez vs. Joval ===
On February 6, 2004, 'El Toro' moved up in weight and fought Raymond Joval of Netherlands at Desert Diamond Casino, Tucson, Arizona, United States. Joval won a technical decision in the eighth round.

=== Hernandez vs. Manfredo Jr. ===
On May 22, 2010, Hernandez lost his attempt to win the International Boxing Organization's vacant middleweight title against The Contender's Peter Manfredo, Jr. by tenth round stoppage.

=== Hernandez vs. Adama ===
On December 17, 2010, Hernandez lost his second shot at a middleweight championship for the vacant IBO international title at UIC Pavilion in Chicago, Illinois to ex-Olympian Osumanu Adama of Ghana by a twelve round unanimous decision.

=== Hernandez Disqualification Loss to Joey Hernandez ===
On March 25, 2011, Hernandez incurred an eighth round disqualification loss to Joey Hernandez, in a bout for the vacant USBO Light Middleweight title. Hernandez was briefly suspended, but was subsequently reinstated. He was relicensed to box by the Illinois Athletic Commission in 2012.

=== Hernandez versus Demetrius Andrade ===
Hernandez failed in an attempted comeback on February 10, 2012, in the main event of a Mohegan Sun Casino seven bout boxing card against 15-0 ex-Olympian Demetrius Andrade in a bout for the vacant IBA Americas light middleweight title. Andrade knocked out Hernandez at 1:39 of the second round. Hernandez, who passed all required medical tests before the bout, was suspended for 90 days.
