= Osumanu Adama =

Ghanaian boxer (born 1980)

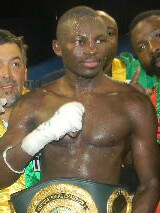
- Adama in 2010

Personal information
- Nickname: Machine Gun
- Nationality: Ghanaian
- Born: 24 December 1980 (age 45) Accra, Ghana
- Height: 1.80 m (5 ft 11 in)
- Weight: Middleweight

Boxing career
- Stance: Orthodox

Boxing record
- Total fights: 32
- Wins: 27
- Win by KO: 20
- Losses: 5

Osumamu Adama (born December 24, 1980) is a Ghanaian professional boxer in the middleweight division, and the first middleweight titleholder from Ghana.

== Early life ==
One of nine children, Osamamu grew up in Accra into a large family, and helped to take care of his six sisters and two brothers. His late mother worked in a grocery store, and his father worked in an ice cream factory. Osumamu attended Kotobabi Technical Institute High School in Accra, and earned a four-year college diploma in mechanical engineering. He later worked as a mechanical engineer for a company in Accra. Whilst growing, his favorite sport was playing soccer, which he still enjoys.

== Amateur boxing career and Olympics ==
Osumanu Adama compiled an amateur boxing record of 54–4 with twenty knockouts in Ghana as a light middleweight. He fought in all Africa games in 1999, where he was silver medalist. He also fought in Turkey and in Spain and he won a silver medal in 2000 before the Olympic Games. He was training in Cuba that time. He won an International boxing tournament gold medal in Indianapolis, Indiana, at 69 kilograms. He represented Ghana Boxing at the 2000 Summer Olympics at Darling Harbour in Sydney, Australia, losing in the third round leading by 10 points during the competition when the referee stopped the contest in the third round of his bout against Mohamed Marmouri of Tunisia.

== Professional career ==
=== Early career ===
Adama turned professional in 2001, with a second-round knockout of Akeem Alarape in the Kaneshie Sports Complex in Accra, racking up seventeen wins in Ghana between 2001 and 2010. His first two bouts in the United States in August 2009 and April 2010 were fought without proper training time at super middleweight and light heavyweight, and Adama lost two close decisions.

=== IBO and USBA titles ===
Adama then moved from North Miami, Florida to Chicago and signed with boxing manager Wasfi Tolaymat of the Chicago Fight Club and train under Joseph Awinongya. On December 17, 2010, at UIC Pavilion in Chicago, Adama won his first title, the vacant IBO international middleweight championship, the first middleweight titleholder ever from Ghana, by twelve round unanimous decision over contender Angel Hernandez. Scoring for the bout was 120–108, 120–108, and 119–109, with Adama winning 35 of 36 rounds on the judges' scorecards. After knocking out Marcus Upshaw to win the vacant USBA middleweight title and achieve the IBF's #1 middleweight contender rating. Adama lost a decision for the IBF World Middleweight title in Tasmania in March 2012 against IBF World champion Daniel Geale. After not fighting for over a year, Adama won a split decision over ten rounds over Grady Brewer in March 2013, and was ranked 16th in the world by BoxRec. Between 2010 and 2015, Adama was being trained by former Ghanaian Boxer Joseph Awinongya.

=== Adama vs. Golovkin ===
Adama then (22–3, 16 KO) earned a bout against Gennady Golovkin for the WBA and IBO middleweight titles. Coming into the fight, Adama was ranked #12 by the WBA. The fight took place in Monte Carlo at the Salle des Etoiles on February 1, 2014. He lost by seventh round stoppage. At the end of the first round, Adama got dropped by Golovkin with a solid jab and right hand. Golovkin went on to drop Adama again in the sixth round by landing two sharp left hooks to his head, and then again in the seventh round with a hard jab. Golovkin then nailed Adama with a left hook to the jaw, sending Adama staggering and forcing the referee to stop the bout. At the time of stoppage, one judge had it 60–52 and the other two at 59–53 in favor of Golovkin.

== Personal life ==
In 2018, Osumanu married his lovely wife.

== Professional boxing record ==
32 fights	27 wins	5 losses
By knockout	20	1
By decision	7	4

No.	Result	Record	Opponent	Type	Round, time	Date	Location	Notes
32	Loss	27–5	Alex Theran	UD	6	May 1, 2021	Olympia Athletic Center, Saint Charles, Missouri, US	
31	Win	27–4	Lawrence Blakey	TKO	3 (6), 1:31	Nov 1, 2019	Horseshoe Casino, Hammond, Indiana, US	
30	Win	26–4	Zachariah Kelley	TKO	4 (6), 2:38	Mar 22, 2019	Horseshoe Casino, Hammond, Indiana, US	
29	Win	25–4	David Okai	TKO	2 (10)	Feb 4, 2017	Seconds Out Boxing Gymnasium, Accra, Ghana	
28	Win	24–4	Stephen Abbey	UD	8	Apr 30, 2015	Cuzzy Bro's, Accra, Ghana	
27	Win	23–4	David Okai	TKO	7 (10), 2:13	Feb 27, 2015	Lebanon House, Accra, Ghana	
26	Loss	22–4	Gennady Golovkin	TKO	7 (12)	Feb 1, 2014	Salle des Étoiles, Monte Carlo, Monaco	For WBA and IBO middleweight titles
25	Win	22–3	Doel Carrasquillo	RTD	6 (8)	Jul 26, 2013	Cicero Stadium, Cicero, Illinois, US	
24	Win	21–3	Grady Brewer	SD	10	Mar 16, 2013	Tsongas Center, Lowell, Massachusetts, US	
23	Loss	20–3	Daniel Geale	UD	12	Mar 7, 2012	Derwent Entertainment Centre, Hobart, Australia	For IBF middleweight title
22	Win	20–2	Roman Karmazin	TKO	9 (12), 0:58	Oct 7, 2011	The Club Chicago, Burbank, Illinois, US	
21	Win	19–2	Marcus Upshaw	TKO	4 (12), 0:42	Mar 25, 2011	Hanging Gardens, River Grove, Illinois, US	Won vacant USBA and IBO Inter-Continental middleweight titles
20	Win	18–2	Ángel Hernández	UD	12	Dec 17, 2010	UIC Pavilion, Chicago, Illinois, US	Won vacant IBO International middleweight title
19	Loss	17–2	Donovan George	UD	8	Apr 30, 2010	UIC Pavilion, Chicago, Illinois, US	
18	Win	17–1	Josival Teixeira	TKO	7 (10)	Feb 6, 2010	Ohene Djan Sports Stadium, Accra, Ghana	
17	Win	16–1	Mohammed Akrong	TKO	6 (12)	Dec 26, 2009	Ohene Djan Sports Stadium, Accra, Ghana	Retained ABU middleweight title
16	Win	15–1	Musa Adam	TKO	2 (8)	Sep 26, 2009	Ohene Djan Sports Stadium, Accra, Ghana	
15	Win	14–1	Anyetei Sowah	KO	1 (6)	Sep 12, 2009	Globe Cinema, Accra, Ghana	
14	Loss	13–1	Dyah Davis	UD	6	Aug 21, 2009	Miami Beach Resort & Spa, Miami Beach, Florida, US	
13	Win	13–0	Philip Darah	RTD	1 (6), 3:00	Nov 22, 2008	Methodist School Park, Teshie, Ghana	
12	Win	12–0	Roman Vanicky	UD	6	Jul 29, 2008	Laser Show Hall, Bobycentrum, Brno, Czech Republic	
11	Win	11–0	Patrik Hruska	UD	8	Oct 27, 2007	Hotel Hilton, Prague, Czech Republic	
10	Win	10–0	Issa Sow	TKO	2 (12), 2:18	Jan 14, 2005	Azumah Nelson Sports Complex, Accra, Ghana	
9	Win	9–0	Mathurin Sechegbe	TKO	3 (12)	Oct 29, 2004	Accra Sports Stadium, Accra, Ghana	Won vacant ABU middleweight title
8	Win	8–0	Mathurin Sechegbe	TKO	3 (12), 1:24	Jul 30, 2004	Kaneshie Sports Complex, Accra, Ghana	Retained WABU light middleweight title; Won vacant WBO Africa light middleweight title
7	Win	7–0	Issa Sow	KO	2 (6)	Jan 14, 2004	Accra, Ghana	
6	Win	6–0	Ayitey Powers	UD	12	Aug 15, 2003	Kaneshie Sports Complex, Accra, Ghana	Won vacant WABU and Ghanaian light middleweight titles
5	Win	5–0	Dick Dosseh	KO	4 (12)	Jun 28, 2003	Globe Cinema, Accra, Ghana	Won vacant WABU and Ghanaian middleweight titles
4	Win	4–0	Robinson Kutsokey	KO	1 (12), 1:07	Feb 8, 2002	Accra Sports Stadium, Accra, Ghana	Retained Ghanaian light middleweight title; Won vacant WABU light middleweight title
3	Win	3–0	Marciano Commey	TKO	2 (12)	Nov 30, 2001	Kaneshie Sports Complex, Accra, Ghana	Won vacant Ghanaian light middleweight title
2	Win	2–0	George Amuzu	PTS	6	Jul 6, 2001	Kumasi, Ghana	
1	Win	1–0	Akeem Alarape	KO	2 (6)	May 25, 2001	Kaneshie Sports Complex, Accra, Ghana	
