= Big Knockout Boxing =

Big Knockout Boxing (BKB)
- Type: Private
- Industry: Combat sport promotion fighting
- Founded: 2013
- Key people: Jon Gieselman, Commissioner; Alex Kaplan, Commissioner; Chris Long, Commissioner; Mike Marchionte, Matchmaker;
- Parent: DirecTV a subsidiary of AT&T
- Website: www.bkb.tv

Big Knockout Boxing (BKB) is a combat sport brand developed and owned by DirecTV, a subsidiary of AT&T. The sport is essentially similar to contemporary professional boxing but utilizing a round-shaped non-lifted solid-base ring, which does not use ropes, corners, and three minute rounds.

== History ==
BKB was created by a group of experienced members of the fight industry. In 2013, the sport debuted with two events in New Hampshire. The Nevada Athletic Commission sanctioned BKB in March 2014. In August 2014, BKB debuted with a pay-per-view card at the Mandalay Bay Events Center in Las Vegas with approximately 4,500 attendees. Bryan Vera and Gabriel Rosado fought for the middleweight title. Rosado defeated Vera by the sixth-round TKO and won the title. Additionally, Anthony Johnson beat Dimar Ortuz by split decision for the cruiserweight title, David Estrada beat Eddie Caminero by unanimous decision for the junior middleweight title, and Javier Garcia beat Darnell Jiles by fifth-round TKO for the welterweight title. For the event, fighters wore traditional boxing gloves. In December 2014, BKB signed multi-fight agreements with Gabe Duluc, Javier Garcia, Herbert Acevedo, Khurshid Abdullaev, and Anthony Johnson. BKB held its second pay-per-view event at the Mandalay Bay led by Rosado and Curtis Stevens in April 2015. The seven-round title fight ended in a draw. Additionally, the event marked the first time the HitChip stats were used. The undercard saw the BKB debut of veteran Jesus Soto Karass defeating Ed Paredes, Anthony Johnson successfully defending the cruiserweight title versus Joey Montoya, David Estrada losing the junior middleweight title to Khurshid Abdullaev, and Javier Garcia losing the welterweight title to Jonathan Chicas. The event also featured BKB's first women's fight. The lightweight championship fight was between Diana Prazak and Layla McCarter and resulted in a win for McCarter with a seventh-round technical knockout over Prazak. The third BKB pay-per-view event was held in June 2015, again at the Mandalay Bay, and featured BKB veteran Julian Pollard defeat Rodney Hernandez (late replacement for kickboxing champion Tyrone Spong) by unanimous decision for the heavyweight title. The undercard featured another MMA veteran, Chris Spång, defeating Samuel Horowitz, the returns of Jesus Soto Karass and Ed Paredes (both lost to Adrian Granados and Janks Trotter, respectively), and the successful BKB debut of Shane Mosley Jr., son of boxer Shane Mosley. On July 22, 2015, Mosley Jr. and Pollard were suspended by the Nevada State Athletic Commission for failing their post-fight drug tests. BKB hasn't held any events since June 2015, and has no future events scheduled.

== Results ==
=== BKB 1 ===
BKB 1 Fight Card - August 16, 2014
Weight class				Method	Round	Time	Notes
Middleweight	Gabe Rosado	def.	Bryan Vera	TKO	6	1:59	(Note: Inaugural BKB Middleweight title)
Cruiserweight	Anthony Johnson	def.	Dimar Ortuz	Split decision (66-65, 65-66, 66-65)	7	2:00	(Note: Inaugural BKB Cruiserweight title)
Welterweight	Javier Garcia	def.	Darnell Jiles	TKO	5	1:48	(Note: Inaugural BKB Welterweight title)
Junior Middleweight	David Estrada	def.	Eddie Caminero	Unanimous decision (69-61, 69-61, 68-62)	7	2:00	(Note: Inaugural BKB Junior Middleweight title)
Junior Middleweight	Khurshid Abdullaev	def.	Ricardo Pinell	Unanimous decision (49-45, 50-44, 50-44)	5	2:00
Junior Welterweight	Gabe Duluc	def.	Kendo Castaneda	Majority decision (49-46, 47-47, 49-46)	5	2:00
Junior Welterweight	Herbert Acevedo	def.	Raul Tovar	TKO	3	1:56
Middleweight	Lekan Byfield	def.	Don Mouton	Unanimous decision (49-44, 48-46, 50-45)	5	2:00
Heavyweight	Julian Pollard	def.	Boban Simic	TKO	3	1:30

=== BKB 2 ===
BKB 2 Fight Card - April 4, 2015
Weight class				Method	Round	Time	Notes
Middleweight	Gabe Rosado (c)	vs.	Curtis Stevens	Majority draw (63-69, 66-66, 66-66)	7	2:00	(Note: For the BKB Middleweight title)
Junior Middleweight	Jesus Soto Karass	def.	Ed Paredes	Unanimous decision (49-46, 49-46, 49-46)	5	2:00
Junior Middleweight	Khurshid Abdullaev	def.	David Estrada (c)	Unanimous decision (69-61, 68-62, 69-61)	7	2:00	(Note: For the BKB Junior Middleweight title)
Cruiserweight	Anthony Johnson (c)	def.	Joey Montoya	Unanimous decision (68-65, 68-65, 68-65)	7	2:00	(Note: For the BKB Cruiserweight title)
Women's Lightweight	Layla McCarter	def.	Diana Prazak	TKO	7	1:50	(Note: Inaugural BKB Female Lightweight title)
Welterweight	Jonathan Chicas	def.	Javier Garcia (c)	TKO	3	0:16	(Note: For the BKB Welterweight title)
Junior Welterweight	Herbert Acevedo	def.	William Hutchinson	Unanimous decision (50-45, 50-45, 50-45)	5	2:00
Junior Welterweight	Gabe Duluc	def.	Antonio Canas	Unanimous decision (50-45, 50-45, 50-45)	5	2:00
Heavyweight	Julian Pollard	def.	Elijah McCall	TKO	4	1:07

=== BKB 3 ===
BKB 3 Fight Card - June 27, 2015
Weight class				Method	Round	Time	Notes
Heavyweight	Julian Pollard	def.	Rodney Hernandez	Unanimous decision (68-65, 69-64, 68-65)	7	2:00	(Note: Inaugural BKB Heavyweight title)
Junior Middleweight	Adrian Granados	def.	Jesus Soto Karass	Split decision (47-48, 49-46, 49-46)	5	2:00
Junior Middleweight	Urmat Ryskeldiev	def.	Marcus Willis	Unanimous decision (50-45, 50-45, 50-45)	5	2:00
Middleweight	Shane Mosley Jr.	vs.	Jason Kelly	No Contest	1	0:51	(Note: Result changed from TKO to No Contest when Mosley tested positive for Adderall.)
Junior Middleweight	Janks Trotter	def.	Ed Paredes	Unanimous decision (47-44, 47-44, 46-45)	5	2:00
Lightweight	Arturo Quintero	def.	Travis Castellon	TKO	4	1:42
Light Heavyweight	Chris Spång	def.	Samuel Horowitz	Unanimous decision (48-46, 49-46, 48-46)	5	2:00
Junior Middleweight	Antonio Johnson	def.	Anthony Castellon	Unanimous decision (48-47, 48-47, 50-45)	5	2:00

== Rules ==
=== The pit ===
BKB is contested in a 17-foot diameter circular surface known as "the pit". The pit's area is approximately half the size of a conventional 20-foot boxing ring (227 to 400 ft^{2}). The small fighting surface is aimed to make fighters confront one another. Referees can deduct one point from a fighter if they intentionally step outside of the pit, that is enclosed by a raised padded area instead of rope.

=== Rounds ===
Rounds under BKB rules last only two minutes, unlike traditional boxing's three-minute rounds. Title fights are seven rounds long and non-title bouts are five rounds long.

=== Attire ===
Fighters wear conventional boxing gloves. BKB developed the first in-glove microchip technology, known as HitChip, that provides viewers with statistics, including the speed of a punch and the pounds of force delivered by the punch.

== Current champions ==
Men
Division	Champion	Since	Defenses
Heavyweight	(United States) Julian Pollard	June 27, 2015	0
Cruiserweight	(United States) Anthony Johnson	August 16, 2014	1
Middleweight	(United States) Gabriel Rosado	August 16, 2014	1
Junior Middleweight	(Russia) Khurshid Abdullaev	April 4, 2015	0
Welterweight	(United States) Jonathan Chicas	April 4, 2015	0

Women
Division	Champion	Since	Defenses
Lightweight	(United States) Layla McCarter	April 4, 2015	0
