= Mario Yagobi =

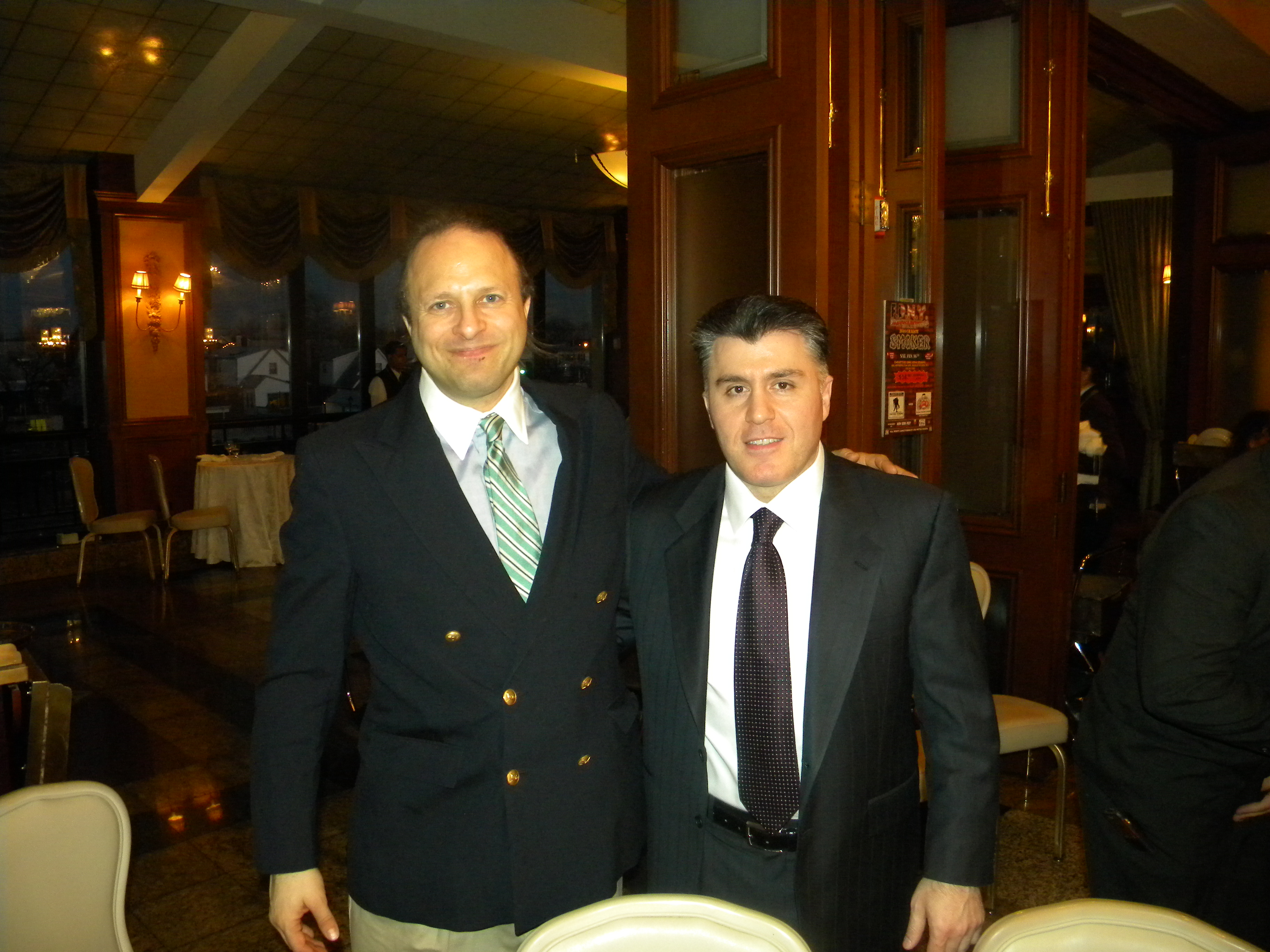
Yagobi (right) at the annual Ring 8 charity benefit for injured and retired boxers in Howard Beach, New York

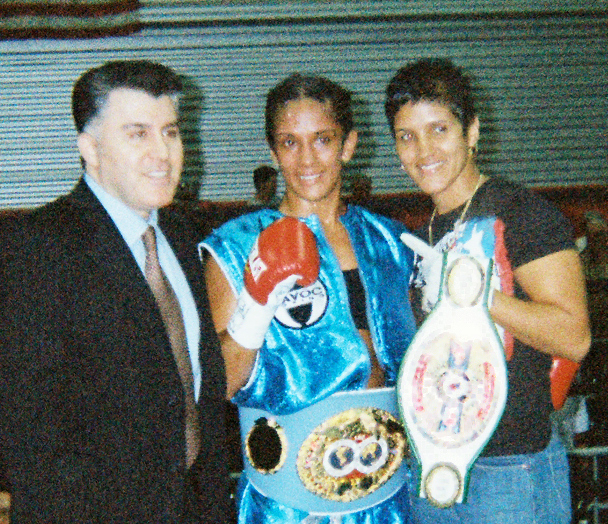
Yagobi, IBF Female World Super Featherweight Champion Amanda Serrano and sister welterweight Cindy Serrano after Amanda won the title in the main event at Aviator Arena in Brooklyn September 10, 2011

Mario Yagubi is an American medical doctor and restaurateur who was the president and CEO of Boxing 360, a boxing promotional group located in New York City, United States, founded in 2009.

== Boxing 360 ==
Yagobi's boxing outfit managed and promoted the career of a number professional fighters, primarily located in the New York City area or relocated to New York City under his guidance. On September 10, 2011, Yagobi promoted his first world champion, Amanda Serrano, to the International Boxing Federation's female version of the super featherweight world title, in the main event of a special September 11 attacks boxing tribute card held at Aviator Arena in Brooklyn. Serrano knocked down and stopped Kimberly Connor in the second round (opponent Kimberly Connor had not lost a pro bout in seven years) of the IBF inaugural female world title bout, to win Yagobi his first world champion under the Boxing 360 banner. Yagobi is the owner-operator of 1849 Restaurant, Bar and Parlor in Greenwich Village.

== NYSAC action of 2014 ==
Boxing 360 no longer exists. The New York State Athletic Commission discontinued Yagubi's promoter's license in 2014, and released all Boxing 360 fighters from their contracts in 2014 after complaints, freeing them to sign with other promoters. Yagubi faced no legal action, but he abandoned his promotional career prematurely. Subsequently, one of Yagubi's forgotten unbeaten fighters, Guyana super middleweight prospect Lennox Allen, won a WBA title on USA ESPN, on February 15, 2019.
