= David Estrada (boxer) =

Guatemalan and Mexican-American boxer

- Referee Gene Rodriguez, David Estrada and manager Wasfi Tolaymat in the ring at UIC Pavilion in Chicago after knocking out challenger Franklin Gonzalez in the fifth round of a scheduled ten rounder on Saturday night, December 17, 2010
- Born: December 19, 1978 (age 47); Chicago, Illinois
- Occupation: boxer

David Estrada (born December 19, 1978) is a Guatemalan and Mexican-American boxer from Chicago.

== Amateur career ==
Estrada started his amateur career in Chicago. He won several titles, including the Chicago Park District Championship in 1993, the PAL National Championship in 1997, and the Texas State Golden Gloves Championship in 1998. His amateur record was 50-10-13, and he was nationally ranked as high as seventh in the United States.

== Professional career ==
Estrada turned pro in Chicago while training at Chicago's Windy City Boxing Gym. After living in Miami for many years, he returned to Chicago.

=== Early bouts ===
Estrada was only 4-0 when he upset Matias Rios 7-0 from Buenos Aires, Argentina after dropping him in the first with a unanimous decision on Galavision TV.

Estrada beat Eric Pinero of Puerto Rico, dropping him in the first round, later winning via a third round TKO on Florida's Sunshine Network TV. He also won over Richard Hall from North Carolina on the Andrew 'Six-Heads' Lewis card in New York City.

Estrada defeated Charles Clark, dropping him in the first round and stopping him by TKO in the fifth round while in the southpaw stance, live on ESPN2. Estrada defeated Luke Leal after pounding him with body shots, dropping him twice live on Telemundo TV. In 2004 and 2005, Estrada beat two fighters back-to-back with a combined record of 33-0-1.

=== Recent fights ===
In April 2010, Estrada secured a top ten ranking by administering a brutal beating to 26-0-1 Orlando Lora, stopping him in eight brutal rounds. Estrada won every round, landing lightning fast counter right hands that broke apart Lora's undefended face on ESPN 2. Estrada, who fell short against the likes of Shane Mosley, Kermit Cintron, Andre Berto, Luis Abregu and Jesus Karass, proved a class above the previously undefeated Lora. Estrada's turnaround improvement can be credited to Estradas new outlook on his boxing career, Estrada believes he was his worst enemy in the past. On December 17, 2010, Estrada knocked out opponent Franklin Gonzalez in the fifth round of a scheduled ten rounder at UIC Pavilion in Chicago.

=== Coaching ===
Estrada currently coaches and trains fighters in Miami.

== Boxing 360 arbitration hearing ==
Estrada is legally contractually promoted by the Boxing 360 promotional group in New York City led by Mario Yagobi. In June 2011, Boxing 360 won an arbitration hearing in New York City against Estrada and stablemate Angel Hernandez of Chicago. The American Arbitration Association in the City of New York ruled in favor of Boxing 360 as Estrada and Hernandez' promoters through February 15, 2013, as well as denying the boxer's claims for injunctive relief. Estrada remains "Under contract with Boxing 360. My main goal was to show, as a relatively new boxing promoter, everyone in boxing that fighters can't pull that stuff with Boxing 360. We proved Boxing 360 will fight for what it believes in," said Dr. Mario Yagobi, founder, president and CEO of Boxing 360, whose group continues official promotional representation of Estrada. “We represent David Estrada. If he does not want to fight, his contract will go on suspension until he fights (for us)," said Dr. Yagobi.

== Big Knockout Boxing career ==
On August 16, 2014, Estrada faced Eddie Caminero for the inaugural Big Knockout Boxing (BKB) junior middleweight title. He defeated Caminero by unanimous decision. In his first defense on April 4, 2015, Estrada lost his title by unanimous decision to Khurshid Abdullaev.

== Professional boxing record ==
26 wins (16 knockouts, 10 decisions), 6 losses (3 knockouts, 3 decisions), 0 draws
Res.	Record	Opponent	Type	Rd., time	Date	Location	Notes
Win	26-6	(Azerbaijan) Rahman Mustafa Yusubov	UD	6 (6)	2013-04-26	(United States) Cicero Stadium, Cicero, Illinois	
Win	25-6	(Dominican Republic) Franklin Gonzalez	KO	5 (10)	2010-12-17	(United States) UIC Pavilion, Chicago, Illinois	
Win	24-6	(Mexico) Orlando Lora	RTD	8 (12)	2010-04-10	(United States) Agua Caliente Casino, Rancho Mirage, California	
Win	23-6	(United States) Chris Gray	TKO	6 (8)	2009-08-21	(United States) UIC Pavilion, Chicago, Illinois	
Loss	22-6	(Argentina) Luis Carlos Abregu	SD	10	2008-12-05	(United States) Chumash Casino, Santa Ynez, California	
Loss	22-5	(Mexico) Jesus Soto Karass	TKO	8 (12)	2008-07-25	(United States) Hard Rock Hotel and Casino, Las Vegas, Nevada	For vacant NABF Welterweight Title
Win	22-4	(Colombia) Alexander Pacheco Quiroz	KO	2 (8)	2008-04-23	(United States) Seminole Hard Rock Hotel and Casino, Hollywood, Florida	
Loss	21-4	(United States) Andre Berto	TKO	11 (12)	2007-09-29	(United States) Boardwalk Hall, Atlantic City, New Jersey	For NABF Welterweight Title
Win	21-3	(United States) Luther Smith	TKO	4 (10)	2007-07-28	(United States) Convention Center, West Palm Beach, Florida	
Win	20-3	(Dominican Republic) David Toribio	TKO	4 (10)	2007-04-13	(United States) Convention Center, West Palm Beach, Florida	
Win	19-3	(United States) Clarence Taylor	RTD	7 (8)	2006-09-20	(United States) Hammerstein Ballroom, New York City, New York	
Loss	18-3	(Puerto Rico) Kermit Cintron	TKO	10 (12)	2006-04-19	(United States) Palm Beach Convention Center, Palm Beach, Florida	
Loss	18-2	(United States) Shane Mosley	UD	10	2005-04-23	(United States) Caesars Palace, Las Vegas, Nevada	
Win	18-1	(Jamaica) Chris Smith	TKO	11 (12)	2005-01-21	(United States) Mohegan Sun Casino, Uncasville, Connecticut	
Win	17-1	(Turkey) Nurhan Suleymanoglu	UD	12	2004-07-15	(United States) Chumash Casino, Santa Ynez, California	Won vacant USBA Welterweight Title
Win	16-1	(Colombia) Nelson Manchego	TKO	5 (8)	2004-05-25	(United States) Radisson Mart Plaza Hotel, Miami, Florida	
Loss	15-1	(United States) Ishe Smith	UD	10	2003-07-31	(United States) Kewadin Casino, Sault Sainte Marie, Michigan	
Win	15-0	(United States) Vincent Harris	UD	8	2003-05-29	(United States) American Airlines Arena, Miami, Florida	
Win	14-0	(United States) Armando Velardez	UD	10	2003-02-07	(United States) Sams Town Hotel, Las Vegas, Nevada	
Win	13-0	(United States) Joel Salas	MD	8	2002-12-20	(United States) American Airlines Arena, Miami, Florida	
Win	12-0	(United States) Vincent Harris	TKO	6 (6)	2002-11-14	(United States) American Airlines Arena, Miami, Florida	
Win	11-0	(United States) Luke Leal	KO	3	2002-05-03	(United States) Gold Country Casino, Oroville, California	
Win	10-0	(United States) Charles Clark	TKO	5 (6)	2001-11-02	(United States) Foxwoods Resort, Mashantucket, Connecticut	
Win	9-0	(United States) Reggie Davis	UD	4	2001-08-03	(United States) Yakama Legends Casino, Toppenish, Washington	
Win	8-0	(United States) Richard Hall	TD	6	2001-04-28	(United States) Hammerstein Ballroom, New York City, New York	
Win	7-0	(United States) Alton Madison	TKO	3 (6)	2000-12-15	(United States) Memorial Auditorium, Fort Lauderdale, Florida	
Win	6-0	(Puerto Rico) Eric Pinero	TKO	3	2000-10-28	(United States) Miccosukee Indian Gaming Resort, Miami, Florida	
Win	5-0	(Argentina) Matias Anibal Rios	UD	6	2000-09-20	(United States) Dundee Training Center, Davie, Florida	
Win	4-0	(United States) Linncorrea Strong	KO	2 (4)	2000-08-16	(United States) Dundee Training Club, Davie, Florida	
Win	3-0	(United States) Bobby Butters	TKO	2 (4)	2000-02-04	(United States) Racquet Club, Chicago, Illinois	
Win	2-0	(United States) Terry Ford	UD	4	1999-11-24	(United States) Fiesta Palace, Waukegan, Illinois	
Win	1-0	(United States) Tyrone Handy	UD	4	1999-10-28	(United States) Hollywood Casino, Aurora, Illinois	Estrada's professional debut

== Big Knockout Boxing record ==
1 win (0 knockouts), 1 loss, 0 draws
Res.	Record	Opponent	Type	Rd., time	Date	Location	Event	Notes
Loss	1–1	(Russia) Khurshid Abdullaev	UD	7	2015-04-04	(United States) Mandalay Bay Resort & Casino, Las Vegas, Nevada	BKB 2	Lost BKB Junior Middleweight title.
Win	1–0	(United States) Eddie Caminero	UD	7	2014-08-16	(United States) Mandalay Bay Resort & Casino, Las Vegas, Nevada	BKB 1	Won vacant BKB Junior Middleweight title.
