= Patrick Majewski =

Polish boxer

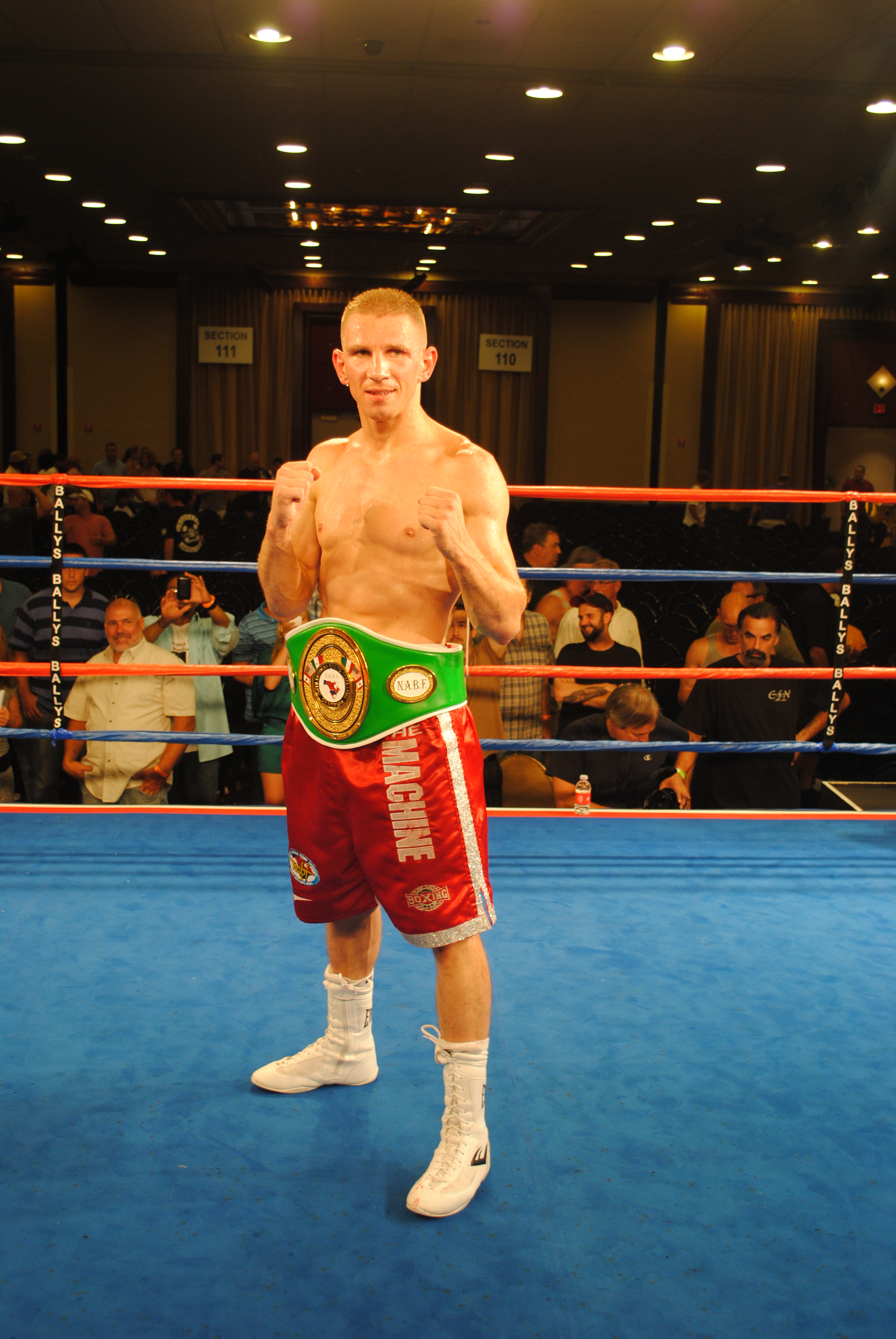
- NABF Middleweight champion Patrick Majewski in the ring at Bally's Atlantic City, photo by sports writer Robert Brizel

Personal information
- Nickname: The Machine
- Nationality: Polish
- Born: Przemysław Majewski; December 23, 1979 (age 46) Radom, Poland
- Height: 6 ft 0 in (183 cm)
- Weight: Middleweight

Boxing career
- Stance: Orthodox

Boxing record
- Total fights: 24
- Wins: 21
- Win by KO: 13
- Losses: 3
- Draws: 0
- No contests: 0

Patrick Majewski (born December 23, 1979) is a retired Polish American professional boxer who was the NABF Middleweight professional boxing champion. He was the highest world ranked Polish boxer based in the United States along with former Heavyweight contender Tomasz Adamek during his career. Nicknamed 'The Machine', Majewski was a wrestler in high school who also excelled in Karate. Majewski went to college to become a teacher in Poland, but later moved Atlantic City, New Jersey in the United States.

== Amateur career ==
After coming to the United States on a student visa exchange visa, Majewski took up amateur boxing. As an amateur, Majewski won the Pennsylvania Golden Gloves title at 165 pounds twice.

== Professional career ==
Majewski began his pro career in 2006 late at age 26 with a 17 fight win streak, including a ten-round decision win over Marcus Upshaw to win the vacant WBO NABO middleweight title in 2011.

On July 7, 2012, Majewski won the vacant NABF middleweight title with a fifth round stoppage over Irish Chris Fitzpatrick at Bally's Atlantic City Hotel Casino in Atlantic City, New Jersey.

== Training Background ==
Majewski's first trainer in Atlantic City was James 'Rocky' McRae. Currently, Majewski is trained by Atlantic City-based trainers Arnold Robbins and Bill Johnson, father the late world lightweight titleholder Leavander Johnson. Majewski is promoted by Global Boxing Promotions, which promotes professional boxing and Mixed Martial Arts (MMA) fighters, as well as amateur boxing.

== Acting career ==
Majewski knocks down his opponent, but subsequently gets knocked out in an imaginary middleweight title bout in season one, episode 8 of the 2012 Spanish television series Cloroformo.

== Professional Boxing Record ==
21 Wins (13 knockouts), 3 Losses, 0 Draw
Result	Record	Opponent	Type	Round	Date	Location	Notes
Loss	21–3	(United States) Curtis Stevens	TKO	1 (10)	2014-01-24	(United States) Resorts International, Atlantic City, New Jersey, USA	
Loss	21–2	(Denmark) Patrick Nielsen	UD	12 (12)	2013-09-08	(Denmark) Frederikshavn	
Win	21–1	(United States) Jamaal Davis	UD	10 (10)	2013-02-23	(United States) Atlantic City, New Jersey	
Win	20–1	(United States) Latif Mundy	MD	10 (10)	2012-09-29	(United States) Atlantic City, New Jersey	
Win	19–1	(United States) Chris Fitzpatrick	RTD	5 (10)	2012-07-07	(United States) Atlantic City, New Jersey	Won vacant WBC-NABF middleweight title
Win	18–1	(United States) Antwun Echols	TKO	3 (8)	2012-04-07	(United States) Southaven, Mississippi	
Loss	17–1	(Colombia) Jose Miguel Torres	TKO	6 (10)	2011-11-05	(United States) Uncasville, Connecticut	Lost WBO-NABO; For vacant WBC-NABF middleweight title
Win	17–0	(United States) Marcus Upshaw	UD	10 (10)	2011-06-11	(United States) Southaven, Mississippi	Won vacant WBO NABO Middleweight title
Win	16–0	(United States) Allen Medina	TKO	1 (6)	2011-04-01	(United States) Philadelphia, Pennsylvania	
Win	15–0	(United States) Eddie Caminero	TKO	8 (8)	2010-12-09	(United States) Newark, New Jersey	
Win	14–0	(United States) Joe Gomez	TKO	7 (8)	2010-10-16	(United States) Kissimmee, Florida	
Win	13–0	(United States) Loren Myers	TKO	6 (8)	2010-05-22	(United States) Atlantic City, New Jersey	
Win	12–0	(United States) Anthony Pietrantonio	UD	6 (6)	2010-02-06	(United States) Newark, New Jersey	
Win	11–0	(United States) Latif Mundy	UD	8 (8)	2009-06-06	(United States) Atlantic City, New Jersey	
Win	10–0	(United States) Jimmy Lubash	TKO	7 (8)	2009-04-24	(United States) Newark, New Jersey	
Win	9–0	(Puerto Rico) Danny Rivera	RTD	5 (6)	2008-11-25	(United States) Melville, New York	
Win	8–0	(Dominican Republic) Ariel Espinal	UD	4 (4)	2008-05-09	(United States) Atlantic City, New Jersey	
Win	7–0	(United States) Victor Paz	TKO	2 (6)	2008-02-15	(United States) Atlantic City, New Jersey	
Win	6–0	(United States) Nick Collins	KO	1 (4)	2007-11-10	(United States) Wildwood, New Jersey	
Win	5–0	(United States) Maurice Williams	UD	4 (4)	2007-08-31	(United States) Atlantic City, New Jersey	
Win	4–0	(United States) Vincent Irwin	TKO	3 (6)	2 Jun 2007	(United States) Atlantic City, New Jersey	
Win	3–0	(United States) Esteban Cordova	UD	4 (4)	2007-02-16	(United States) Franklin Square, New York	
Win	2–0	(United States) Ken Dunham	TKO	2 (4)	2006-12-24	(United States) New York, New York	
Win	1–0	(United States) Terry Peacock	TKO	2 (4)	2006-09-20	(United States) New York, New York	
