= Saúl Román =

Mexican boxer (born 1980)

Personal information
- Nickname: La Fiera
- Born: Saúl Román Martínez Castañeda; 3 July 1980 (age 46) Culiacán, Sinaloa, Mexico
- Height: 179 cm (5 ft 10 in)
- Weight: Middleweight; Light Middleweight; Welterweight

Boxing career
- Reach: 197 cm (78 in)
- Stance: Orthodox

Boxing record
- Total fights: 61
- Wins: 46
- Win by KO: 38
- Losses: 15
- Draws: 0
- No contests: 0

Saúl Román Martínez Castañeda (born 3 July 1980) is a Mexican professional boxer and the former Mexican National Light Middleweight Champion.

== Pro career ==
Román defeated Michael Medina in Mexico. On 27 April 2007, he lost by knockout to Argentine future world champion Sergio Martínez in a WBC Light Middleweight title eliminator bout. He also fought Yuri Foreman and lost by unanimous decision in 2008.

=== WBC Silver Championship ===
On 4 June 2011 Saúl lost to undefeated Vanes Martirosyan for the WBC Silver Light Middleweight title. This bout was on HBO's televised portion of the Sebastian Zbik vs. Julio César Chávez Jr. undercard.

=== Professional record ===
37 Wins (31 knockouts), 11 Losses
Res.	Record	Opponent	Type	Rd., Time	Date	Location	Notes
Loss	37-11	(United States) Charles Hatley	TKO	2 (10)	2015-04-03	(United States) Convention Center, Irving, Texas, USA	
Loss	37-10	(United States) Curtis Stevens	KO	1 (10)	2013-08-03	(United States) Mohegan Sun Casino, Uncasville, Connecticut, USA	
Win	37-9	(Mexico) Jose Pinzon	TKO	9 (10)	2013-03-23	Arena Foro Tecate, Culiacan, Sinaloa, Mexico	
Loss	36-9	(Mexico) Martin Avila	KO	2 (10)	2012-06-08	Parque Revolucion, Culiacan, Sinaloa, Mexico	
Win	35-9	(Colombia) Richard Gutierrez	UD	10	2014-10-03	Arena Ciudad de Mexico, Mexico City, Distrito Federal, Mexico	
Loss	34-9	(Armenia) Vanes Martirosyan	TKO	7 (12)	2011-06-04	(United States) Staples Center, Los Angeles, California, USA	
Win	34-8	(United States) Michael Medina	TKO	2 (10)	2011-01-29	Estadio Banorte, Culiacan, Sinaloa, Mexico	
Win	33-8	(Mexico) Joel Juarez	TKO	3 (10)	2010-12-17	Explanada Tecate, Navojoa, Sonora, Mexico	
Loss	32-8	(Mexico) David Alonso Lopez	UD	12 (12)	2010-08-28	Gimnasio de Mexicali, Mexicali, Baja California, Mexico	
Loss	32-7	(South Africa) Thomas Oosthuizen	KO	8 (10)	2010-04-27	Emperors Palace, Kempton Park, Gauteng, South Africa	
Loss	32-6	(United States) Gabriel Rosado	SD	10 (10)	2010-02-27	(United States) Bally's Atlantic City, Atlantic City, New Jersey, USA	
