= Michael Medina =

American boxer

Personal information
- Nickname: The Mexican
- Born: Michael Medina-Franco; July 9, 1986 (age 39) Modesto, California, United States
- Height: 6 ft 0 in (183 cm)
- Weight: Middleweight; Light middleweight

Boxing career
- Reach: 74 in (189 cm)
- Stance: Orthodox

Boxing record
- Total fights: 33
- Wins: 26
- Win by KO: 19
- Losses: 5
- Draws: 2
- No contests: 0

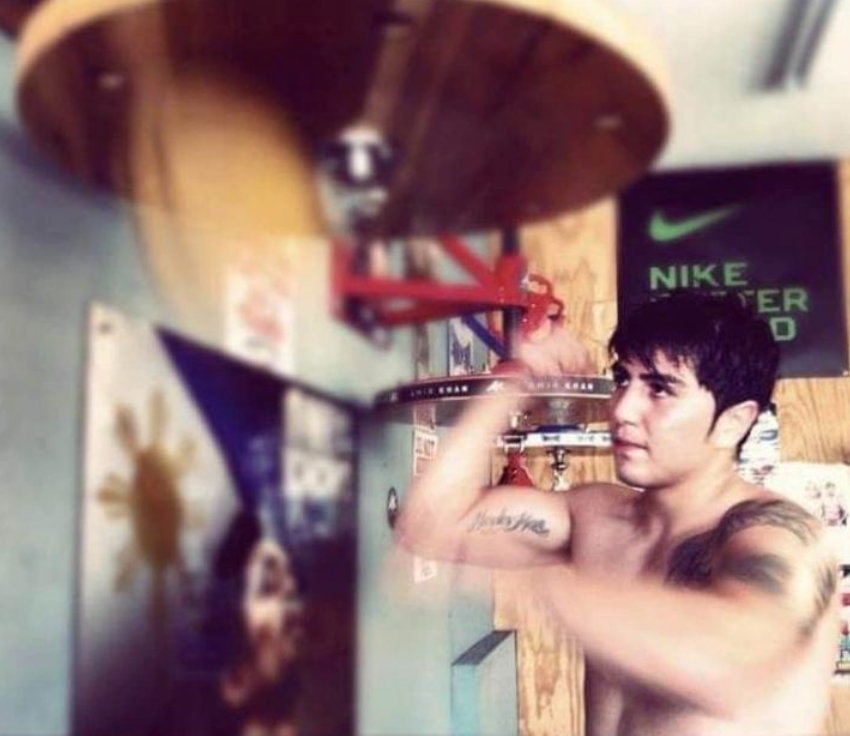
Michael Medina-Franco Speedbag

Michael Medina Franco (born July 9, 1986) is an American former professional boxer who competed from 2005 to 2014. He held the NABF light middleweight title.

== Professional career ==
On March 13, 2010, Medina lost a split decision to John Duddy in Cowboys Stadium.

In December 2012, Medina beat the veteran Grady Brewer to win the NABF light middleweight title. This bout was televised by ESPN as a main event for Friday Night Fights.

== Personal life ==
He was born in Modesto, California. He currently resides in Los Angeles, California.
