= Lisa Tucker =

Lisa Tucker may refer to:

- Lisa Tucker (author), American author who is credited for three novels in young adult and adult fiction, active 2003–present
- Lisa Tucker (singer) (born 1989), American singer, musical theater actress, and television actress
