= Carl Davis (boxer) =

American boxer (born 1973)

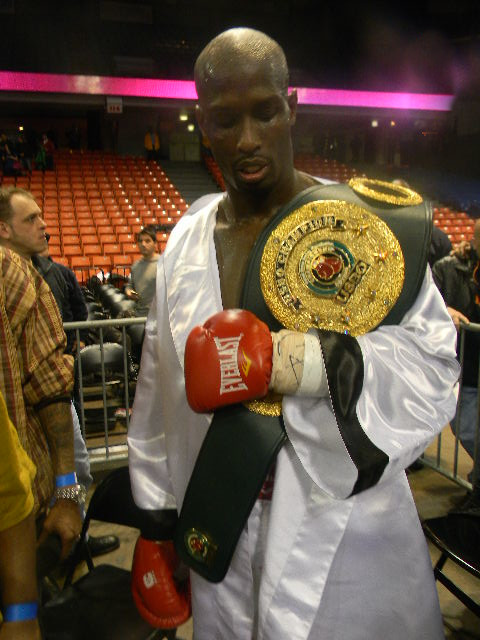

Personal information
- Nickname: Iron Fist
- Born: November 16, 1973 (age 52) Chicago, Illinois, U.S.
- Height: 6 ft 4 in (193 cm)

Boxing career
- Stance: Orthodox

Boxing record
- Total fights: 23
- Wins: 17
- Win by KO: 13
- Losses: 7

Carl Davis (born November 16, 1973) is an American former professional boxer who competed between 2003 and 2017. He scored Notable Victories over Former Cruiserweight World Champion Arthur Williams and Former Heavyweight Title Challenger Bert Cooper.

== Amateur boxing career ==
Davis attended Percy Lavon Julian High School in Chicago. Davis won the Chicago Golden Gloves Novice Heavyweight Championship in 2000 by knocking out all opponents in the first round. Davis won the Chicago Golden Gloves Open Heavyweight Championship in 2002 by knocking out the first two opponents, decisioned regional champion William Terry in the semifinal, and decisioned defending champion Russell Felger in the final round. Davis traveled to London, England, in 2002 and decisioned British amateur heavyweight champion Brian Robinson, in a United States versus Great Britain competition.

== Professional boxing career ==
Davis turned pro in the heavyweight division on April 25, 2003, with a 38-second knockout of Michael Shanks in Rosemont, Illinois. He compiled a record of 14-3 as a heavyweight. Under Schaefer's tutelage and guidance, Davis converted over thirty-five pounds to muscle mass, and returned to the ring as a cruiserweight. On Friday, December 17, 2010, at UIC Pavilion in Chicago, Davis won the vacant USBO Cruiserweight title with a ten-round unanimous decision over former world cruiserweight champion 'King' Arthur Williams (boxer). Bout scoring was 97–93, 96–93, 96-93 for Davis. Davis returned to fighting at heavyweight above 200 pounds and made a successful comeback on September 9, 2012, at the Hammond Civic Center in Indiana with a second record stoppage of former number one heavyweight contender Bert Cooper after knocking Cooper down for a count of nine. He subsequently lost to Andy Ruiz Jr., who went on to win the world heavyweight championship and was recognized as the best heavyweight in the world after defeating Anthony Joshua.

== Successful comeback attempt ==
On December 2, 2017, at Carnivore Grounds, in Nairobi, Kenya, Davis made a successful comeback at age 44, opening an eight bout card by scoring a third round stoppage of Mbaruku Kheri of Tanzania, in the opening preliminary bout to the World Boxing Council female super bantamweight world championship main event.

== Professional football career ==
Davis played professional football as an outside linebacker and defensive end for the Hamilton Tiger-Cats of the Canadian Football League in 1996 and 1997. Carl retired from pro football after the 1997 season CFL football to resume his professional boxing career.

== Martial arts and work life ==
Davis is an expert practitioner of Brazilian Jiu-Jitsu and Shaolin Kung Fu, a background which assists him in the security field. Davis co-owns and operates Respect One's Family Security, a private security firm which provides personal security for athletes and entertainers at public events, and security teams at concerts and sporting events handling crowd control. Davis also works with developmentally challenged students with developmental disability ages 13–19 in public school and private school settings as a crisis intervention worker and mental health professional.

== Personal life ==
Davis resides with his wife, Tywanda, and children in Chicago.
