= Aviator Sports and Events Center =

Arena in Brooklyn, New York

Coordinates: 40°35′21″N 73°53′55″W

- Interactive map of Aviator Sports and Events Center
- Location: 3159 Flatbush Ave; Brooklyn, New York
- Owner: Gateway National Recreation Area
- Operator: Aviator Sports and Events Center
- Acreage: 30 acres (12 ha)
- Public transit: Q35 bus

Construction
- Opened: 2006

Website
- www.aviatorsports.com

Aviator Sports and Events Center is a sports and events center in Floyd Bennett Field, Brooklyn, New York City. Operating as a concessionaire of the National Park Service (NPS), Aviator has refurbished four historic aircraft hangars and the surrounding grounds in partnership with the NPS. The area includes 175,000 square feet (16,300 m^{2}) of indoor sports and event space along with adjoining outdoor turf fields and free parking for 2,000 cars. Aviator provides a variety of sports and league play, including basketball, football, gymnastics, ice hockey, ice skating, lacrosse, soccer, and volleyball. Parties, field trips, camps, and birthday celebrations are held at the facility.

The NPS and Aviator formed a partnership in 2003, and the facility opened in 2006. By combining several of Floyd Bennett Field's hangars, they created one of the largest sports complexes in the country and the largest in New York.

== Facilities ==
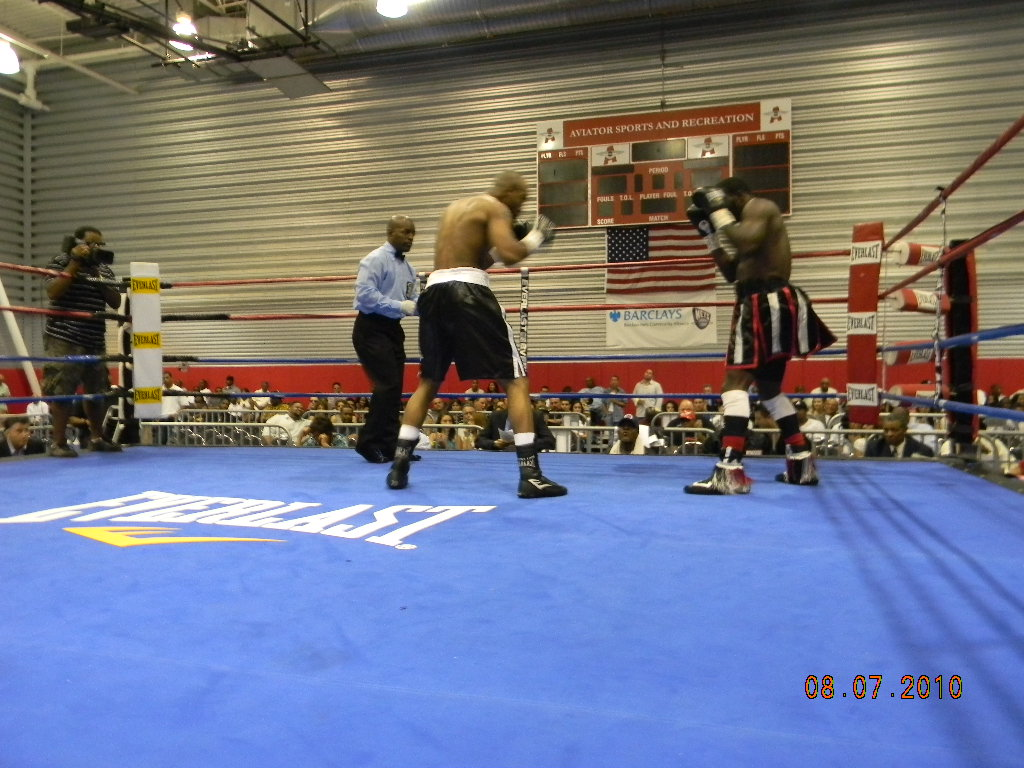
Super middleweight boxers Lennox Allen and Darnell Boone battle to an eight-round majority draw at Aviator Arena Sports and Recreation Facility, on Saturday, August 7, 2010.

The Aviator Complex contains ice skating rinks within two of the hangars. The other two hangars contain a field house, a gymnastics and dance complex, and a fitness center totaling more than 48,000 square feet (4,500 m^{2}), as well as a 6,000-seat football field outside.

Aviator's Sports Facilities include:

- Two synthetic turf outdoor fields
- Outdoor event space
- Two indoor ice rinks
- 18,000-square-foot (1,700 m^{2}) field house with hardwood floor, climbing wall and turf field
- 16,000-square-foot (1,500 m^{2}) Gymnastics Center
- 14,000-square-foot (1,300 m^{2}) Fitness center
- Arcade
- Food court
- Indoor and Outdoor Sports Bar
- Full catering and food service
- Large corporate meeting and private events rooms

Aviator Sports and Events Center hosts programs and activities including camps, birthday parties, field trips, and sporting meets. The complex also hosts sporting events and shows throughout the year, and the occasional air show.

Once inside the indoor entrance to the center, an entire inner wall tribute several stories high is dedicated to the history of Aeronautics which took place on the site of the sports facility and the people of flight who made Bennett Field famous. These include Wiley Post, the first pilot to solo around the world, who flew around the world from the field and returned to it in 7 days 19 hours and 49 minutes in July 1933; and billionaire Howard Hughes, who flew 14,791 miles (23,804 km) around the world from Floyd Bennett Field in July 1938 and returned to it with a crew of four men in 3 days, 19 hours, 8 minutes, 10 seconds to collect important navigational data.

== Events ==
Since 2011, Aviator Sports and Events Center has become a prominent location for obstacle races and expos in New York City. Events that have taken place through a rental agreement include: Rugged Maniac, Big Bounce America, Night Nation Run, Sneaker Exit, UniverSoul Circus, St. Jude's Kids for Kids Fundraiser, Tomato Battle, Civilian Military Combine, weddings, and more.

== Strategic relationships ==
- Concessionaire of National Park Service , servicing Floyd Bennett Field area of Gateway National Recreation Area,

== Tenants ==
- ASA College Soccer
- Berkeley College Men's & Women's Soccer teams
- Bishop Ford High School Football & Soccer teams
- Brooklyn Lacrosse Club
- Blau Weiss Gottschee Soccer Club
- Dutch Total Soccer
- Medgar Evers College Men's & Women's Soccer teams
- Mendy Kolko Football
- Metro Fighting Moose Hockey Team
- NYU-Poly Men's & Women's Soccer & Women's Lacrosse
- SABA Youth Soccer
- St. Ann's School Soccer
- Xaverian High School Football and Soccer
- Multiple semi pro football teams

== Historical footage ==
- Howard Hughes rare airplane silent black and white video footage taking off with his team on his historical round the flight from Floyd Bennett Field
- Howard Hughes rare silent black and white video footage landing at Floyd Bennett Field and being interviewed after a 10½ hour nonstop transatlantic flight
