= List of female boxers =

This is a list of notable female boxers. For a list of notable male boxers, see List of male boxers.

== A ==
Name	Nationality	Trainer	Weight (lb)	Division	Style	Team	Years active	Ranking
Michele Aboro	UK		54 kilograms (119 lb)	Super Bantamweight	Boxing		1995–2001	
Conjestina Achieng	Kenya			Middleweight	Boxing		2000–2009	
Marcela Acuña	Argentina		55 kilograms (121 lb)	Super Bantamweight	Boxing		1997–	
Nicola Adams	England		51 kilograms (112 lb)	Flyweight	Boxing		1995–2019	Retired.
Meltem Akar	Turkey		48 kilograms (106 lb)	Super bantamweight	Boxing		2006–	
Lena Åkesson	Sweden		59 kilograms (130 lb)	Lightweight	Boxing		1997–1999	
Derya Aktop	Turkey		46 kilograms (101 lb)	Light Flyweight	Boxing		c. 2002–	
Patricia Alcivar	USA Colombia		50 kilograms (110 lb)	Super Flyweight	Boxing		c. 1995–	
Estefany Alegria	Mexico			Light Flyweight	Boxing		2021–	
Shondell Alfred	Guyana		52 kilograms (115 lb)	Super Flyweight	Boxing		1999–	
Laila Ali	USA		76 kilograms (168 lb)	Super Middleweight	Boxing		1997–2007	
Almudena Álvarez	Spain			Super-featherweight	Boxing			
Tania Alvarez	Spain			Super-bantamweight, Featherweight	Boxing			
Sumya Anani	USA		63 kilograms (139 lb)	Welterweight	Boxing		1996–2006	
Amy Andrew	New Zealand			Featherweight	Boxing			
Paulina Ángel	Colombia			Super-lightweight, Lightweight, Super-featherweight, Featherweight	Boxing			
Theresa Arnold	USA		54 kilograms (119 lb)	Super Bantamweight	Boxing		1995–1998	
Jasmine Artiga	USA			Super-flyweight	Boxing			
Alicia Ashley	Jamaica		55 kilograms (121 lb)	Super Bantamweight	Boxing		1999–	
Emily Asquith	England			Light-heavyweight	Boxing			
Tiah-Mai Ayton	England			Featherweight, Lightweight, Bantamweight	Boxing			

== B ==
Name	Nationality	Trainer	Weight (lb)	Division	Style	Team	Years active	Ranking
Sarah Bailey	Canada, Sierra Leone			Light flyweight, Flyweight, Bantamweight	Boxing		2015–	
Hellen Baleke	Uganda	Mercy Mukankusi		Middleweight	Boxing		2005–	
Selina Barrios	USA			Lightweight	Boxing			
Kirstie Bavington	England			Super-lightweight, Welterweight	Boxing			
Leila Beaudoin	Canada			Super-featherweight	Boxing			
Julia Berezikova	Russia		57 kilograms (126 lb)	Featherweight	Boxing		2003–	
Jemyma Betrian	Netherlands		52 kilograms (115 lb)	Flyweight	Boxing		2005–	
Taoriba Biniati	Kiribati		57 kilograms (126 lb)	Lightweight	Boxing		2014–	
Arlene Blencowe	Australia		66 kilograms (146 lb)	Featherweight	Boxing		2012–	
Yesica Bopp	Argentina			Light flyweight	Boxing		2008–	
Lovlina Borgohain	India			Welterweight	Boxing			
Ashley Brace	Wales			Bantamweight, Super-flyweight	Boxing			
Cecilia Brækhus	Norway		64 kilograms (141 lb)	Welterweight	Boxing		2007–	World Champion
Cathy Brown	UK	Adam Booth	61 kilograms (134 lb)	Flyweight	Boxing		1999–2006	3
Cherrelle Brown	England			Super-lightweight	Boxing			
Leona Brown	USA		55 kilograms (121 lb)	Bantamweight	Boxing		1997–2006	
Lisa Brown	TTO	Errol Brown		Super Bantamweight	Boxing		1997–2013	
Tiara Brown	USA		57 kilograms (126 lb)	Featherweight	Boxing		2016–	
Brenda Burnside	USA		55 kilograms (121 lb)	Super Flyweight	Boxing		1997–2000	
Barbara Buttrick	UK		50 kilograms (110 lb)	Flyweight	Boxing		1948–1960	
Tracy Byrd	USA		61 kilograms (134 lb)	Lightweight	Boxing		1996–2006	

== C ==
Name	Nationality	Trainer	Weight (lb)	Division	Style	Team	Years active	Ranking
Chantelle Cameron	UK			Light welterweight	Boxing			
Bonnie Canino	USA				Boxing			
Yvonne Caples	USA			Light Flyweight	Boxing			
Nurcan Çarkçı	Turkey			Light Middleweight	Boxing			
Graciela Casillas	USA			Bantamweight	Boxing			
Kavita Chahal	India			Heavyweight	Boxing			
Raven Chapman	England			Featherweight	Boxing			
Jackie Chavez	USA			Super Bantamweight	Boxing			
Choi Hyunmi	South Korea			Super Featherweight	Boxing			
Mavzuna Chorieva	Tajikistan			Lightweight	Boxing			
Anita Christensen	Denmark				Boxing			
Jaime Clampitt	Canada		135	Lightweight	Boxing			
Pat Coombs	UK				Boxing			
Jane Couch	UK			Welterweight	Boxing			
Teuta Cuni	Sweden				Boxing			
Juli Crockett	USA				Boxing			retired
Christina Cruz	USA			Flyweight, Bantamweight	Boxing			

== D ==
Name	Nationality	Trainer	Weight (lb)	Division	Style	Team	Years active	Ranking
Cathy Davis	USA			Welterweight	Boxing			
Melissa Del Valle	Puerto Rico			Light Welterweight	Boxing			
Patricia Demick	USA Chile				Boxing			
Andrea DeShong	USA				Boxing			
Laishram Sarita Devi	India			Lightweight	Boxing			
Emma Dolan	England			Super-flyweight	Boxing			
Hessie Donahue	USA				Boxing			
Para Draine	USA			Super bantamweight	Boxing			
Carolina Duer	ARG			Bantamweight and Super Flyweight	Boxing			WBO world champion
Diana Dutra	Canada			Welterweight	Boxing			

== E ==
Name	Nationality	Trainer	Weight (lb)	Division	Style	Team	Years active	Ranking
Ijeoma Egbunine	Nigeria			Light Heavyweight	Boxing	TSE club		
Khadija El-Mardi	Morocco			Middleweight	Boxing			
Jill Emery	USA				Boxing			
Hasibe Erkoç	Turkey			Flyweight	Boxing			

== F ==
Name	Nationality	Trainer	Weight (lb)	Division	Style	Team	Years active	Ranking
Erica Farias	Argentina			Super Lightweight	Boxing			
Siona Fernandes	New Zealand				Boxing			
Melissa Fiorentino	USA			Super Featherweight	Boxing			
Hannah Fox	USA				Boxing			
Jackie Frazier-Lyde	USA			Super Middleweight	Boxing			

== G ==
Name	Nationality	Trainer	Weight (lb)	Division	Style	Team	Years active	Ranking
Hanna Gabriel	Costa Rica				Boxing			
Tysie Gallagher	England			Super-bantamweight	Boxing			
Amanda Galle	Canada			Bantamweight	Boxing			
Jeannine Garside	Canada			Super Bantamweight	Boxing			
Dawn George	USA			Middleweight	Boxing			
Isra Girgrah	USA				Boxing			
Deirdre Gogarty	Ireland				Boxing			
Delia Gonzalez	USA			Flyweight	Boxing			
Belle Gordon	USA	John Donaldson			Bag-punching		1894–1915	
Kavita Goyat	India				Boxing			
Alesia Graf	Belarus			Bantamweight	Boxing			
Laura Grzyb	POL			Super bantamweight	Boxing			
Gina Guidi	USA				Boxing			
Yenebier Guillen	DOM				Boxing			

== H ==
Name	Nationality	Trainer	Weight (lb)	Division	Style	Team	Years active	Ranking
Ivana Habazin	Croatia			Welterweight	Boxing		2010 - present	
Chevelle Hallback	USA			Welterweight	Boxing			
Regina Halmich	Germany			Flyweight	Boxing			
Tonya Harding	USA				Boxing			
Heather Hardy	USA				Boxing			
Katie Healy	England			Super-bantamweight, Bantamweight	Boxing			
Melissa Hernandez	Puerto Rico				Boxing			
Kirsty Hill	England			Super-featherweight, Lightweight	Boxing			
Holly Holm	USA		135	Bantamweight	Boxing		2001–present	
Nicola Hopewell	England			Flyweight, Super-flyweight	Boxing			
Kim Hye-Song	North Korea				Boxing			

== I ==
Name	Nationality	Trainer	Weight (lb)	Division	Style	Team	Years active	Ranking
Umi Ishikawa	Japan			Atomweight, Strawweight	Boxing			

== J ==
Name	Nationality	Trainer	Weight (lb)	Division	Style	Team	Years active	Ranking
Jelena Janićijević	Serbia			Lightweight, Light-welterweight, Welterweight	Boxing			
Stephanie Jaramillo	USA			Welterweight	Boxing			
Natasha Jonas	England			Lightweight	Boxing			
Ebonie Jones	England			Featherweight, Super-bantamweight	Boxing			
Mariana Juárez	MEX			Bantamweight	Boxing			

== K ==
Name	Nationality	Trainer	Weight (lb)	Division	Style	Team	Years active	Ranking
Noriko Kariya	Canada				Boxing			
Sümeyra Kaya	Turkey			Flyweight	Boxing			
Imane Khelif	Algeria			Welterweight	Boxing			
Mary Kom	India			Flyweight	Boxing			
Phyllis Kugler	USA			Featherweight	Boxing		1956–1959	
Yuko Kuroki	Japan			Atomweight, Minimumweight, Light-flyweight	Southpaw			

== L ==
Name	Nationality	Trainer	Weight (lb)	Division	Style	Team	Years active	Ranking
Daisy Lang	Bulgaria			Bantamweight	Boxing			
Belinda Laracuente	Puerto Rico				Boxing			
Jennifer Lehane	Ireland			Bantamweight	Southpaw			
Clara Lescurat	Argentina			Super-flyweight	Boxing			
Pamela London	Guyana				Boxing			
Ella Lonsdale	England			Lightweight	Boxing			
Olivia Luczak	PolandGermany				Boxing			
Gentiane Lupi	New Zealand				Boxing			

== M ==
Name	Nationality	Trainer	Weight (lb)	Division	Style	Team	Years active	Ranking
Karlha Magliocco	Venezuela				Boxing			
Valerie Mahfood	USA			Super Middleweight	Boxing			
Kina Malpartida	Perù			Super Featherweight	Boxing			
Savannah Marshall	UK			Super Featherweight	Boxing			
Christy Martin	USA			Light Middleweight	Boxing			
Érica Matos	Brazil				Boxing			
Mischa Merz	Australia				Boxing			
Daina Moorehouse	Ireland			Light-flyweight, Flyweight	Boxing			
Pearl Morake	Botswana			Middleweight	Boxing			
Terri Moss	USA			Strawweight	Boxing			

== N ==
Name	Nationality	Trainer	Weight (lb)	Division	Style	Team	Years active	Ranking
Jujeath Nagaowa	PHI				Boxing			
Emily Nakalema	Uganda			Welterweight	Boxing			
Eva Naranjo	Spain			Bantamweight	Boxing		2015 - 2019	
Jackie Nava	Mexico			Super Featherweight	Boxing			
Alanna Nihell	Northern Ireland			Lightweight	Boxing			
Mónica Núñez	DOM			Super Middleweight	Boxing			
Elif Nur Turhan	Turkey			Lightweight, Super-featherweight	Boxing		2022 - present	

== O ==
Name	Nationality	Trainer	Weight (lb)	Division	Style	Team	Years active	Ranking
Daisy Ocasio	Puerto Rico				Boxing			
Shannon O'Connell	Australia				Boxing			
Alejandra Oliveras	Argentina			Super Lightweight Featherweight	Boxing			
Eileen Olszewski	USA			Flyweight	Boxing			
Christine Ongare	Kenya			Flyweight	Boxing			
Citlalli Ortiz	Mexico			Super-middleweight	Boxing			
Tamao Ozawa	Japan			Super-flyweight, Flyweight, Light-flyweight	Boxing			

== P ==
Name	Nationality	Trainer	Weight (lb)	Division	Style	Team	Years active	Ranking
Lauren Parker	England			Super-flyweight	Boxing			
Johanna Pena-Alvarez	DOM				Boxing			
Delfine Persoon	Belgium			Lightweight	Boxing			
Stoyka Petrova	Bulgaria				Boxing			
Stephanie Piñeiro	Puerto Rico			Welterweight, Super-lightweight	Southpaw			
Diana Prazak	Australia			Super Featherweight	Boxing			
Alice Pumphrey	England			Light-flyweight, Flyweight	Boxing			

== R ==
Name	Nationality	Trainer	Weight (lb)	Division	Style	Team	Years active	Ranking
Natascha Ragosina	Russia			Super Middleweight	Boxing			
Emiko Raika	Japan			Featherweight	Boxing			
Jessica Rakoczy	Canada				Boxing			
Ria Ramnarine	Trinidad				Boxing			
Hannah Rankin	Scotland			Light middleweight	Boxing			
Friba Razayee	Afghanistan				Boxing			
Chantelle Reid	England			Light middleweight, Middleweight	Boxing			
Elena Reid	USA				Boxing			
Suzanne Riccio-Major	USA				Boxing			
Lucia Rijker	NED				Boxing			
Bridgett Riley	USA				Boxing			
Kara Ro	CAN				Boxing			
Leatitia Robinson	USA			Middleweight	Boxing			
Shannon Ryan	England			Super-flyweight	Boxing			

== S ==
Name	Nationality	Trainer	Weight (lb)	Division	Style	Team	Years active	Ranking
Giselle Salandy	Trinidad				Boxing			
Martha Salazar	USA			Heavyweight	Boxing			
Irma Sanchez	Mexico			Light Flyweight	Boxing			
Åsa Sandell	Sweden			Super Middleweight	Boxing			
Mary Jo Sanders	USA			Middleweight	Boxing			
Linn Sandström	Sweden, Australia			Super-flyweight, Flyweight	Boxing			
Pamela Noutcho Sawa	Italy			Lightweight	Boxing			
Amanda Serrano	Puerto Rico			Featherweight	Boxing			
Laura Serrano	Mexico			Featherweight	Boxing			
Parvati Shallow	USA				Boxing			
Maureen Shea	USA			Featherweight	Boxing			
Claressa Shields	USA			Middleweight	Boxing			
Carly Skelly	England			Bantamweight, Super-bantamweight	Boxing			
Becky Smith	CAN				Boxing			
Daniella Smith	New Zealand				Boxing			
Emilie Sonvico	France			Welterweight	Boxing			
Mia St. John	USA				Boxing			
Cristiana Stancu	Romania				Boxing			
Michelle Sutcliffe	GBR				Boxing			
Klara Svensson	Sweden			Sandy Ryan	Boxing			

== T ==
Name	Nationality	Trainer	Weight (lb)	Division	Style	Team	Years active	Ranking
Yoko Takahasi	Japan				Boxing			
Tomomi Takano	Japan			Bantamweight	Boxing			
Gülsüm Tatar	Turkey			Light Welterweight	Boxing			
Katie Taylor	Ireland			Lightweight	Boxing			
Dina Thorslund	Denmark			Bantamweight	Boxing			
Amy Timlin	England			Bantamweight, Super-bantamweight, Featherweight, Super-featherweight	Boxing			
Ana Maria Torres	Mexico			Super Flyweight	Boxing			
Yvonne Trevino	USA			Flyweight	Boxing			

== U ==
Name	Nationality	Trainer	Weight (lb)	Division	Style	Team	Years active	Ranking
Yasemin Ustalar	Turkey				Boxing			

== V ==
Name	Nationality	Trainer	Weight (lb)	Division	Style	Team	Years active	Ranking
Ada Vélez	Puerto Rico			Bantamweight	Boxing			
Shelly Vincent	USA			Super-bantamweight, Featherweight	Boxing			
Elena Vystropova	Azerbaijan			Middleweight	Boxing			

== W ==
Name	Nationality	Trainer	Weight (lb)	Division	Style	Team	Years active	Ranking
Eva Wahlström	Finland				Boxing			
Frida Wallberg	Sweden				Boxing			
Vonda Ward	USA			Heavyweight	Boxing			
Melinda Watpool	Canada			Middleweight, Super-middleweight	Boxing			
Chloe Watson	England			Flyweight, Super-flyweight	Boxing			
Dora and Cora Webber	USA				Boxing			
Kaliesha West	USA			Super Bantamweight	Boxing			
Ann Wolfe	USA			Light Heavyweight	Boxing			
Samantha Worthington	USA			Super lightweight	Boxing			

== Y ==
Name	Nationality	Trainer	Weight (lb)	Division	Style	Team	Years active	Ranking
Selma Yağcı	Turkey			Cruiserweight	Boxing			
Sumire Yamanaka	Japan			Atomweight, Mini-flyweight	Southpaw			
Duda Yankovich	Brazil				Boxing			
Şemsi Yaralı	Turkey			Heavyweight	Boxing			

== Z ==
Name	Nationality	Trainer	Weight (lb)	Division	Style	Team	Years active	Ranking
Vaia Zaganas	Turkey				Boxing			
Jasmina Zapotoczna	Poland			Flyweight, Super-flyweight	Boxing			
Nikhat Zareen	India		51 kilograms (112 lb)	Flyweight and Light flyweight	Boxing		2009–present	
Tatyana Zrazhevskaya	Russia			Bantamweight, Super bantamweight	Boxing		2016–present	

== See also ==
- List of current female world boxing champions
- List of current women's boxing rankings
- List of male boxers
