= Suzanne Riccio-Major =

American boxer

Personal information
- Nationality: American
- Born: October 16, 1963 (age 62)
- Weight: Super-bantamweight

Boxing career

Boxing record
- Total fights: 15
- Wins: 7
- Losses: 8

Suzanne Riccio-Major (born October 16, 1963), also known as Suzanne Riccio, is a former female boxer who fought two times for world titles. She also competed against many of women's boxing top fighters.

Riccio-Major was born in Pittsfield, Massachusetts in 1963. She began her career in professional boxing at the age of twenty-six, when she and Andrea Buchanan drew (tied) after five rounds on November 1, 1989, at Bristol, Tennessee. Riccio Major obtained her first victory, a five-round decision win over Stacey Prestage, on her second bout, held on November 17, 1990, in Fort Myers, Florida.

For her third bout, held on February 25, 1991, also at Bristol, she met young rising star Christy Martin, who dealt Riccio her first loss, beating her by a five-round decision.

Riccio then took five years away from boxing, deciding to return during the dawn of the often called "golden era of women's boxing", when she took on Sue Chase on June 3, 1996, at Warrensville Heights, Ohio. The then thirty-three-year-old Riccio won by a five-round decision. On July 27, she lost to Theresa Arnold by an eight-round decision at Rochester, Washington.

On January 17, 1997, Riccio-Major earned her first, and only, professional boxing knockout win, when she defeated Patricia Simms in the first round, at Waukegan, Illinois.

After that victory, she was offered her first shot at a world championship, when she met Cheryl Robertson, on February 3, for the WIBF's world bantamweight title. Riccio-Major lost by a ten-round decision, in New Orleans.

Immediately after that title shot, Riccio-Major was offered another world title try, when she fought with the IFBA world Flyweight champion. Yvonne Trevino, in Biloxi. Once again, she lost by a ten-round decision.

After that defeat, she scored three wins in a row, two against Karina Hernandez Gastelum. She suffered, however, a three fight losing streak after those three wins, being defeated by "Downtown Leona Brown" on points, by Trevino in a rematch which saw both women go down, by Tko in five rounds, when referee, the late Mitch Halpern stepped in for no apparent reason. a ref not wanted by the major team [ex Husband/Trainer, William Major] initially for his anti women boxing views. Trevino and her manager Jackie Kallen promised a rematch which never materialized and to Kathy Williams in her only fight abroad, on points. The fight with Williams was held in Canada.

On July 28, 2000, she got her last career win, beating Larissa Smith in Boston by a six-round decision. After losing to Jamillia Lawrence by knockout in two rounds on August 25 of that year in Saratoga Springs, New York, she retired from boxing in 2001.

Riccio-Major had 7 wins, 8 losses some controversial and one draw in professional boxing, with one win by knockout.

== Professional boxing record ==
16 fights	15 wins	1 loss
By knockout	8	0
By decision	7	1

No.	Result	Record	Opponent	Type	Round, time	Date	Location	Notes
16	Loss		Jamillia Lawrence	TKO		2000-08-25	City Center, Saratoga	
15	Win		Larissa Smith	UD		2000-07-28	The Roxy, Boston	
14	Loss		Kathy Williams	UD		1999-06-24	Winsdor, Canada	
13	Loss		Yvonne Trevino	TKO		1999-05-28	Orleans Hotel & Casino, Las Vegas	
12	Loss		Leona Brown	UD		1998-08-15	Arizona Charlie's, Las Vegas	
11	Win		Leilani Salazar	SD		1998-06-06	Arizona Charlie's, Las Vegas	
10	Win		Karina Hernandez	UD		1998-04-18	Arizona Charlie's, Las Vegas	
9	Win		Karina Hernandez	UD		1998-02-06	Arizona Charlie's, Las Vegas	
8	Loss		Yvonne Trevino	UD		1997-08-02	Grand Casino, Biloxi	International Female Boxers Association World Bantamweight Title
7	Loss		Cheryll Robertson	UD		1997-03-02	UNO Lakefront Arena, New Orleans	Interim Women's International Boxing Federation World Flyweight Title
6	Win		Patricia Simms	TKO		1997-01-17	Fiesta Palace, Waukegan	
5	Loss		Theresa Arnold	UD		1996-07-27	Lucky Eagle Casino, Rochester	
4	Win		Sue Chase	MD		1996-05-03	Warrensville Heights	
3	Loss		Christy Martin	PTS		1991-02-25	Bristol	
2	Win		Stacey Prestage	UD		1990-11-17	Lee County Civic Center, Fort Myers	
1	Draw		Angela Buchanan	PTS		1989-11-01		
