= Leona Brown =

American boxer

Personal information
- Nickname: Downtown
- Born: Leona Brown; July 27, 1960 (age 65) Buffalo, New York, U.S.
- Height: 4 ft 11 in (150 cm)
- Weight: Bantamweight

Boxing career
- Stance: Orthodox

Boxing record
- Total fights: 30
- Wins: 13
- Win by KO: 5
- Losses: 17
- Draws: 0
- No contests: 0

Leona Brown (born July 27, 1960) is a female boxer who is the WIBC world Bantamweight champion. Because of her age, many consider her to be "the George Foreman of women's boxing". Brown's nickname, "Downtown", is both a homage to actress Downtown Julie Brown, and it also serves as name play, such as in the case of "Hannah The Vegas Fox".

== Career ==
A native of Buffalo, New York, she now lives in Wappinger, New York.

Brown was an award winning amateur boxer, winning the New York state golden gloves award before turning professional, on September 27. 1997, beating Judy Mayrand by a four round unanimous decision in Germantown, Pennsylvania. Brown proceeded to win her first seven fights as a professional, including victories over Sue Chase, Sonya Emery and Suzanne Riccio.

On her eighth professional bout, fought June 11, 1999 in Bossier City, Louisiana, she fought for a world title for the first time, losing a ten round decision to IFBA world Bantamweight champion Eva Jones. Her next bout was a six round unanimous decision loss at the hands of the noted Margaret Sidoroff.

On October 1, 1999, Brown became a world champion for the first time, when she knocked out Dee Dufoe in round ten to become the IFBA's world Super Bantamweight champion.

That short success was followed by defeat and disappointment, however, as she lost seven of her next eight bouts, beginning with a world title unification against WIBF world Super Bantamweight champion Michele Aboro on May 13, 2000. Brown lost a ten round split decision, and her IFBA world title, to Aboro in Germany. Other boxers that defeated her during this period included Alicia Ashley, Kathy Williams and Lisa Brown (twice). Her only win during those eight bouts came against Ria Ramnarine, by a knockout in round four, on July 27 of 2001.

After defeating Renee Richardt, she was given another chance at the WIBF world Super Bantamweight title, flying over to Austria, where she lost to Esther Schouten by a ten round decision, on June 9, 2002. That loss marked the beginning of another losing streak for Brown, as she lost her next three bouts as well. These included a defeat at the hands of Ada Vélez. She broke that streak with a fourth round knockout of Terri Cruz on April 23, 2004, in Denver, Colorado.

After another loss and a win, she was given another chance at becoming world champion again, and, on November 20, Brown took on Stephaney George of Guyana for the WIBC world Bantamweight title, in Poughkeepsie, New York. Brown won a world title on a second division when she beat George by a unanimous decision, on a fight that the judges saw as a one-sided affair (all three judges scored the fight 100–90 in favor of Brown).

Leona Brown holds a professional boxing record of 13 wins and 14 losses, with 5 knockout wins.

== Professional boxing record ==
30 fights	13 wins	17 losses
By knockout	5	0
By decision	8	17

No.	Result	Record	Opponent	Type	Round, time	Date	Location	Notes
30	Loss		Danielle Bouchard	UD		2006-03-03	Salle Antoine-Labelle, Laval	
29	Loss		Kelsey Jeffries	UD		2005-07-21	HP Pavilion, San Jose	
28	Loss		Jackie Nava	UD		2005-05-30	Grand Hotel, Tijuana	vacant WBC World Female Super Bantamweight Title
27	Win		Stephaney George	UD		2004-11-20	Mid-Hudson Civic Center, Poughkeepsie	
26	Win		Olga Heron	UD		2004-08-24	Mid-Hudson Civic Center, Poughkeepsie	
25	Loss		Kelsey Jeffries	UD		2004-06-17	Seven Feathers Hotel & Casino Resort, Canyonville	
24	Win		Terri Lynn Cruz	TKO		2004-05-23	Club Avalon, Denver	
23	Loss		Melissa Fiorentino	UD		2004-05-14	Convention Center, Providence	
22	Loss		Lakeysha Williams	UD		2003-08-21	Adam’s Mark Hotel, Philadelphia	
21	Loss		Ada Velez	DQ		2003-03-29	Seminole Casino, Coconut Creek	
20	Loss		Esther Schouten			2002-11-09	Trend Eventhotel Pyramide, Vienna	Women's International Boxing Federation World Super Bantamweight Title
19	Win		Renee Richardt	UD		2002-07-12	Civic Center, Glens Falls	
18	Loss		Lakeysha Williams	UD		2002-01-25	Dover Downs, Dover	
17	Loss		Lisa Brown	PTS		2001-09-01	Cedarbridge Academy	
16	Win		Ria Ramnarine	TKO		2001-07-27	Civic Center, Niagara Falls	
15	Loss		Lisa Brown	UD		2001-04-27	Civic Center, Niagara Falls	
14	Loss		Iwona Guzowska	UD		2000-12-02	Gdansk, Poland	
13	Loss		Kathy Williams	UD		2000-11-02	Freeman Coliseum, San Antonio	
12	Loss		Alicia Ashley	SD		2000-06-29	Viking Hall, Philadelphia	
11	Loss		Michele Aboro	UD		2000-05-13	Sartory Saale, Cologne	Women's International Boxing Federation World Super Bantamweight Title
10	Win		Dee Dufoe	TKO		1999-10-01	Horseshoe Casino, Bossier City	vacant International Female Boxers Association World Super Bantamweight Title
9	Loss		Margaret Sidoroff	UD		1999-07-20	Casino Windsor, Windsor	
8	Loss		Eva Jones Young	UD		1999-06-11	Bossier City	vacant International Female Boxers Association World Bantamweight Title
7	Win		Katie Burton	UD		1998-09-11	Tropicana Hotel & Casino, Atlantic City	
6	Win		Suzanne Riccio-Major	UD		1998-08-15	Arizona Charlie's, Las Vegas	
5	Win		Sonya Emery	SD		1998-07-31	Tropicana Hotel & Casino, Atlantic City	
4	Win		Natasha Wilburn	TKO		1998-03-21	Atlantic City	
3	Win		Sue Chase	TKO		1998-01-10	Tropicana Hotel & Casino, Atlantic City	
2	Win		Lisa Foster	UD		1997-11-21	Yonkers Raceway, Yonkers	
1	Win		Judy Mayrand	TKO		1997-09-27	National Guard Armory, West Palm Beach	

== See also ==
- List of female boxers
