= Giselle Salandy =

Trinidad and Tobago boxer

Gisselle Salandy

Personal information
- Born: Joenette Giselle Ife Salandy; 25 January 1987 Siparia, Trinidad and Tobago
- Died: 4 January 2009 (aged 21) Port of Spain, Trinidad and Tobago
- Height: 5 ft 7 in (170 cm)
- Weight: Light welterweight; Light middleweight

Boxing career
- Stance: Orthodox

Boxing record
- Total fights: 16
- Wins: 16
- Win by KO: 6

Joenette Giselle Ife Salandy ORTT (25 January 1987 – 4 January 2009) was a Trinidadian professional boxer. She was an undefeated unified light middleweight world champion, holding the WBA and WBC, as well as the IWBF, WIBA, WIBF, and GBU female titles, from 2006 until her death in 2009.

== Early life and education ==
Joenette Giselle Ife Salandy was born on 25 January 1987 in Siparia in southern Trinidad. Her mother Maureen died when Giselle was 11 years old. She then resided with Ivy Corian who raised her until she was 14 years old. She attended St. Bridgid's Girls' RC School, Penal Junior Secondary School and then Fyzabad Composite School. She had two siblings, Josanne and Joel.

== Athletic career ==
At the age of eleven years, nursing a broken arm, Giselle visited the White Eagles Gym with her stepbrother Joel Eligon and started punching a punching bag. She was immediately recognized by the trainers in the gym, Kim 'Bone Crusher' Quashie and Fitzroy Richards. Giselle thereafter got involved in the sport. She made her professional debut at 13 years of age, under coach/manager, Fitzroy Richards. She picked up a series of six victory fights throughout Trinidad and Tobago and the islands of Tortola and Anguilla, with opponents such as Johanna Peña-Álvarez and Ria Ramnarine.

In October 2001, Salandy fought and defeated Paola Rojas, becoming the youngest person to win a boxing title, WIBA IBERO Title, at age 14.

After six fights under coach/manager, Fitzroy Richards, Salandy changed manager to her adopted father, Curtis Joseph and trainer to Joseph "Black Mamba" Charles, a former boxer. Thereafter she could not have boxed because the law of Trinidad and Tobago stated a person under the age of 17 cannot obtain a professional boxing license, thus causing her boxing career to come to a temporary halt.

Five days after her 17th birthday, Giselle returned to the ring in Chaguanas and successfully defended her IBERO Title against Paola Rojas on a card co-promoted by Curtis Joseph, Boxu Potts and Cecil Ford. After that fight her manager, Curtis Joseph, failed to secure fights for her causing her boxing career to come to a halt again. Boxu Potts privately contacted her about a show he was promoting. Salandy then pressured Curtis Joseph into allowing her to represent her country by fighting on Potts' T&T vs. US boxing card.

At age 18, on 23 September 2005, on the T&T vs. US boxing card, promoted by Boxu Potts, Salandy fought and defeated Manela Daniels, breaking a second world record by becoming the youngest female in the world to win the NABC World Title. However, again, manager Curtis Joseph was unable to secure fights for her. She became frustrated with this and severed her work relationship with Curtis Joseph. Shortly after, Salandy and Kim Quashie contacted Boxu Potts to take over managing her career.

Salandy fought Manela Daniels at the Petrotrin Grounds in Fyzabad, a fight she had previously booked, which was promoted by Arthur Sanderson. Salandy then signed a promotional contract with Potts and left her Fyzabad home and went to live with Potts and his family at their Arima home while Miller was in training camp in Ghana.

On 9 December 2006 she became the first person to win six world title belts in one fight. Salandy was awarded Top History Making Fighter of the year 2006 by WBAN, was awarded First Citizen Sports Woman of the year 2006 by The First Citizen Sports Foundation in Trinidad and Tobago and was also presented with the Chaconia Gold Medal by the President of Trinidad and Tobago for her achievement in boxing.

Salandy successfully defended her six world titles against Yvonne Reis on 24 March 2007.

On 15 March 2008 super middleweight Natascha Ragosina broke Salandy's record by winning seven belts in one fight. However, only two weeks later at the Centre of Excellence in Trinidad and Tobago, Salandy fought and defeated the then unbeaten Karolina Lukasik in her mandatory defense, regaining her world record by winning eight title belts in one fight. These title belts were: WBC, WBA, WBE, WIBA, IWBF, WIBF, GBU and UBC.

Again on 26 December 2008, Salandy fought and defeated the fourth ranked Yahaira Hernandez, securing her eight title belts and breaking a Caribbean record by being the first boxer in the history of the Caribbean to successfully defend all her world titles six consecutive times.

On 31 August 2009 Salandy was posthumously awarded Trinidad's highest national award, the Order of the Republic of Trinidad and Tobago. Salandy was the first boxer in the history of the Caribbean to ever receive such an award.

She was inducted into the International Women's Boxing Hall of Fame in July 2016. Salandy was also named as an Eternal Champion by the WBC.

== Professional boxing record ==
16 fights	16 wins	0 losses
By knockout	6	0
By decision	10	0

No.	Result	Record	Opponent	Type	Round, time	Date	Location	Notes
16	Win	16–0	Yahaira Hernandez	UD	10	26 Dec 2008	Jean Pierre Sports Complex, Mucurapo, Trinidad and Tobago	Retained WBA, WBC and WIBA female light middleweight titles
15	Win	15–0	Karolina Lukasik	UD	10	29 Mar 2008	Centre of Excellence, Tunapuna, Trinidad and Tobago	Retained WBA, WBC, WIBA and IWBF female light middleweight titles; Won WIBF and GBU female light middleweight titles
14	Win	14–0	Dakota Stone	UD	10	30 Nov 2007	Jean Pierre Sports Complex, Mucurapo, Trinidad and Tobago	Retained WBA, WBC and WIBA female light middleweight titles
13	Win	13–0	Yvonne Reis	UD	10	24 Mar 2007	Skinner Park, San Fernando, Trinidad and Tobago	Retained WBA, WBC, IWBF, NABC and WBE female light middleweight titles; Won vacant WIBA female light middleweight title
12	Win	12–0	Miriam Brakache	UD	10	9 Dec 2006	Jean Pierre Sports Complex, Mucurapo, Trinidad and Tobago	Retained WBA and WBC female light middleweight titles; Won IWBF, NABC, WBE and vacant IWBA female light middleweight titles
11	Win	11–0	Elizabeth Mooney	TKO	7 (10)	15 Sep 2006	Skinner Park, San Fernando, Trinidad and Tobago	Won vacant WBA and WBC female light middleweight titles
10	Win	10–0	Manela Daniels	TKO	3 (6), 2:10	15 Jun 2006	Petrotrin Grounds, Fyzabad, Trinidad and Tobago	
9	Win	9–0	Manela Daniels	UD	8	23 Sep 2005	Jean Pierre Sports Complex, Mucurapo, Trinidad and Tobago	
8	Win	8–0	Paola Rojas	UD	8	30 Jan 2004	Jean Pierre Sports Complex, Mucurapo, Trinidad and Tobago	Retained WIBA Iberian-American light welterweight title
7	Win	7–0	Paola Rojas	UD	8	9 Nov 2002	Willemstad, Curaçao	Won vacant WIBA Iberian-American light welterweight title
6	Win	6–0	Johanna Peña Álvarez	PTS	6	5 Aug 2001	Santo Domingo, Dominican Republic	
5	Win	5–0	Maria Rosario	KO	1 (4)	4 Feb 2001	Saint Thomas, U.S. Virgin Islands	
4	Win	4–0	Erica Benjamin	PTS	4	19 Jan 2001	Port of Spain, Trinidad and Tobago	
3	Win	3–0	Ann Howard	KO	2 (4)	14 Oct 2000	Marabella, Trinidad and Tobago	
2	Win	2–0	Nimba Wahtuse	KO	3 (4)	15 Apr 2000	Port of Spain, Trinidad and Tobago	
1	Win	1–0	Nimba Wahtuse	KO	3 (4)	25 Feb 2000	Port of Spain, Trinidad and Tobago	

== Death ==
Salandy died in a motor vehicle collision on the morning of 4 January 2009, crashing her vehicle into a concrete pillar while driving west into Port of Spain on the Beetham Highway. She succumbed to her injuries at around 8:29 a.m. She was 21 years old. The other occupant of the vehicle, national footballer Tamar Watson, was admitted to hospital in critical condition, having suffered massive internal injuries and broken limbs.

Salandy was given a state funeral.

=== Controversy ===
Relatives of Salandy questioned why she was allowed to drive herself on Sunday, as she had a driver was assigned to her. Salandy, who held a driver's permit for the last two years, hired a 21-year-old man to be her driver because of her hectic schedule. Boxu Potts dispelled rumours that the driver abandoned his job, and claimed it was Salandy's decision to drive herself, and her cousin stressed that no one was to blame for the accident.

== See also ==
- List of female boxers
- List of undefeated world boxing champions

Sporting positions
Major world boxing titles
Inaugural champion	WBA female light middleweight champion 15 September 2006 – 4 January 2009; Vacant upon death	Vacant Title next held by Layla McCarter
Inaugural champion	WBC female light middleweight champion 15 September 2006 – 4 January 2009; Vacant upon death	Vacant Title next held by Christy Martin
Inaugural champion	Undisputed female light middleweight champion 15 September 2006 – 4 January 2009; Vacant upon death	Vacant Title next held by Claressa Shields
