= Theresa Arnold =

American boxer (born 1962)

Personal information
- Nickname: Zif
- Nationality: American
- Born: September 20, 1962 (age 63) Boise, Idaho, U.S.
- Height: 5 ft 5 in (165 cm)
- Weight: Super Bantamweight, Bantamweight

Boxing career
- Stance: Southpaw

Boxing record
- Total fights: 17
- Wins: 15
- Win by KO: 4
- Losses: 1
- Draws: 1
- No contests: 0

Theresa Arnold (born September 20, 1962) is a female boxer who beat a number of name fighters during her career. A native of Boise, Idaho, she still lives in her hometown.

Arnold was important in women's boxing popularity rise in Idaho. Only three of her seventeen bouts were held outside the Northwest United States area, however, a fact that might have prevented her from becoming a larger celebrity. Arnold was one of the figures that helped make the city of Worley a "mecca" of women's boxing.

On November 29, 1995, she beat Carol Stinson by a decision in four rounds in Washington, marking her professional boxing debut. On December 8, she beat Dolores Lira, also by decision, in what marked her debut at her home state. Nineteen days later, she beat the well known Kim Messer, also by decision.

On May 17, 1996, she got her first knockout win, when she stopped Robyn Lopez in three rounds at Caldwell, a small Idaho town. On July 27 of that year, she defeated Suzanne Riccio-Major by an eight round unanimous decision, and then, five days later, she beat Sue Chase, also by decision, but over four rounds instead.

On September 19 of that year, one day before her 34th. birthday, Arnold got what was perhaps the strangest win of her career: fighting outside the Northwest for the first time, she earned a disqualification win when her opponent, Bridgett Riley, lost her contact lenses and was disqualified after five rounds of boxing. Disappointed about the outcome of that fight, Riley retired from boxing for some time, a fact that would later prove vital in a rematch.

A win and a draw (tie) against Katherine Etheridge followed, before Arnold and Riley were rematched. On May 17, 1997, exactly one year after her first knockout win and in her second fight outside the Northwest, she got her second knockout victory when she defeated Riley in their Indio, California rematch, with a sixth round stoppage.

She followed that win with a first round knockout over Kim Young fourteen days later, and another victory over Sue Chase.

On November 12, of that year, she had her first world championship try, when she faced Para Draine for the IBA's world Bantamweight title, in Worley. Arnold became world champion when she outpointed Draine over ten rounds, taking a split decision victory.

On January 10, 1998, Arnold tried to unify her IBA world title with the WIBF's vacant world Bantamweight title, but she suffered her only career loss that night, being knocked out in seven rounds by Eva Jones, in Atlantic City, New Jersey. This was Arnold's only Eastern coast fight.

Arnold had two more wins before deciding to retire, but they were both significant because of different reasons: on April 1, 1998, she achieved another first round knockout, this time over Deanna Wyman, in Worley. And on her last fight, she defeated another well known female boxer, Sonya Emery, on September 23, by an eight round split decision.

Arnold retired with a record of 15 wins, 1 loss and 1 draw, with 4 wins by knockout.

== Championships and accomplishments ==
- 1997 – IBA Bantamweight title
- 1996 – NWA Super Bantamweight title

== Professional boxing record ==
17 fights	15 wins	1 loss
By knockout	4	0
By decision	11	1
Draws	1	

No.	Result	Record	Opponent	Type	Round, time	Date	Location	Notes
17	Win		Sonya Emery	SD		1998-09-23	Coeur d'Alene Casino, Worley	
16	Win		Deanna Wyman	KO		1998-04-01	Coeur d'Alene Casino, Worley	
15	Loss		Eva Jones	TKO		1998-01-10	Tropicana Hotel & Casino, Atlantic City	vacant International Women's Boxing Federation World Bantamweight Title
14	Win		Para Draine	SD		1997-11-12	Coeur d'Alene Casino, Worley	International Boxing Association Female Bantamweight Title
13	Win		Sue Chase	UD		1997-08-06	Lucky Eagle Casino, Rochester	
12	Win		Kim Young	TKO		1997-05-31	O'Conner Field House, Caldwell	
11	Win		Bridgett Riley	TKO		1997-05-17	Fantasy Springs Casino, Indio	
10	Draw		Katherine Etheridge	PTS		1996-12-07	O'Conner Fieldhouse, Caldwell	
9	Win		Katherine Etheridge	UD		1996-10-30	Lucky Eagle Casino, Rochester	
8	Win		Bridgett Riley	DQ		1996-09-19	Olympic Auditorium, Los Angeles	
7	Win		Sue Chase	PTS		1996-08-02	Boise, Idaho	
6	Win		Suzanne Riccio-Major	UD		1996-07-27	Lucky Eagle Casino, Rochester	
5	Win		Robyn Lopez	TKO		1996-05-17	O'Conner Fieldhouse, Caldwell	
4	Win		Ramona Gatto	UD		1996-03-27	Lucky Eagle Casino, Rochester	
3	Win		Kim Messer	PTS		1995-12-27	Lucky Eagle Casino, Rochester	
2	Win		Dolores Lira	UD		1995-12-08	O'Conner Fieldhouse, Caldwell	
1	Win		Carol Stinson	PTS		1995-11-29	Lucky Eagle Casino, Rochester	

== See also ==
- List of female boxers
