= Eva Jones =

American boxer (born 1964)

Personal information
- Nickname: Sweet Magic
- Nationality: American
- Born: Eva Jones-Young; July 14, 1964 (age 62) South Bend, Indiana, U.S.
- Height: 5 ft 3 in (160 cm)
- Weight: Bantamweight; Super bantamweight

Boxing career
- Reach: 65 in (165 cm)
- Stance: Southpaw

Boxing record
- Total fights: 20
- Wins: 15
- Win by KO: 5
- Losses: 4
- Draws: 1

Eva Jones-Young (born July 14, 1964), better known as Eva Jones, is an American former professional boxer who competed between 1996 and 2009. She held the WIBF and IWBF bantamweight titles in 1998 and the IFBA bantamweight title in 1999. Jones-Young was inducted into the International Women's Boxing Hall of Fame in 2022.

== Career ==
On November 9, 1996, Jones began her professional boxing career, beating Deirdre Rodriguez by a four-round split decision in Cedar Rapids, Iowa. On March 3, 1997, she beat Anissa Zamarron by a four-round unanimous decision in Houston, Texas.

In her fifth fight, August 14, 1997, she suffered her first professional defeat, when she boxed Para Draine at Worley, Idaho, losing a four-round unanimous decision. But she rebounded from that loss with a first-round knockout, which was also her first career knockout victory, against top prospect, Kim Jeffryes, on September 9.

Jones won three more bouts, including Delia Gonzalez on October 24, 1997, whom Jones defeated in Tula, Mississippi by a unanimous six-round decision. Then on January 10, 1998, she faced IBA world Bantamweight champion Theresa Arnold for the vacant IWBF world Bantamweight title. Jones became a world champion and, at the same time, the only person to defeat Arnold as a professional, with a seventh-round knockout win in Atlantic City, New Jersey.

On March 24, 1998, she claimed the WIBF world Bantamweight title with a fourth-round knockout of Cheryll Robinson. After winning a non-title bout, she and Draine had a rematch, on November 12, 1998, in Kansas City, Missouri, and Jones avenged her defeat, handing Draine an eight-round decision loss in another non-title bout.

To defend her WIBF title, Jones travelled to Saint Thomas, U.S. Virgin Islands, where she lost the title to Margaret Sidoroff, by a ten-round split decision, on February 26, 1999.

Immediately after, she was given a second chance at becoming world Bantamweight champion, when she boxed "Downtown Leona Brown" for Brown's IFBA world Bantamweight championship, on June 11 of that same year. Jones became world Bantamweight champion for the second time, when she defeated Brown by a ten-round decision, in Bossier City, Louisiana.

On July 23, she beat Jamilia Lawrence by decision in a non-title fight, but on February 5, 2000, she lost to Michele Aboro by a tenth-round knockout in Germany for the WIBF's vacant world Super Bantamweight fight, in what has been her last fight.

== Professional boxing record ==
20 fights	15 wins	4 losses
By knockout	5	0
By decision	10	4
Draws	1	

No.	Result	Record	Opponent	Type	Round, time	Date	Location	Notes
20								
19								
18								
17			Michele Aboro					
16								
15			Leona Brown					
14								
13			Para Draine					
12								
11								
10			Theresa Arnold					
9			Delia Gonzalez					
8								
7								
6								
5			Para Draine					
4								
3								
2								
1								
