= Jill Matthews =

American boxer (born 1964)

Personal information
- Nickname: The Zion Lion
- Born: February 3, 1964 (age 62) New York City, New York, U.S.
- Height: 5 ft 3 1/2 in (161 cm)
- Weight: Light flyweight; Flyweight

Boxing career

Boxing record
- Total fights: 14
- Wins: 9
- Win by KO: 7
- Losses: 4
- Draws: 1

Jill Matthews (born February 3, 1964) is an American former professional boxer who competed from 1995 to 1999. She took up boxing aged 31 and as an amateur won a New York Golden Gloves title. As a professional, Matthews held the International Women's Boxing Federation (IWBF) light flyweight title in 1998. and challenged for the WIBF light flyweight title in 1999. She was inducted into the International Women's Boxing Hall of Fame in 2025.

== Professional boxing record ==
14 fights	9 wins	4 losses
By knockout	7	1
By decision	2	3
Draws	1	

No.	Result	Record	Opponent	Type	Round, time	Date	Location	Notes
14	Loss	9-4-1	Regina Halmich	UD	10	18 Sep 1999	Maritim Hotel, Stuttgart, Germany	Fought for IBF female light flyweight title
13	Win	9-3-1	Tammy Roberts	TKO		1999-08-26	Roxy Theater, Atlanta	
12	Win	8-3-1	Lori Lord	MD		1999-07-30	Foxwoods Resort, Mashantucket	
11	Loss	7-3-1	Kim Messer	UD		1999-05-14	National Guard Armory, Pikesville	
10	Win	6-3-1	Lisa Houghton	TKO		1998-06-30	Trump Taj Mahal, Atlantic City	
9	Win	5-3-1	Anissa Zamarron	UD		1998-03-21	Atlantic City	International Women's Boxing Federation World Light Fly Title
8	Win	4-3-1	Lisa Houghton	KO		1998-01-30	Holiday Inn, Newark	
7	Win	4-2-1	Anissa Zamarron	PTS		1998-01-10	Tropicana Hotel & Casino, Atlantic City	International Women's Boxing Federation World Light Fly Title
6	Win	4-2-0	Jamie Blair	KO		1997-10-11	George Town, Australia	
5	Win	3-2-0	Angela Barnes	TKO		1997-07-15	Riverside Convention Center, Rochester	
4	Loss	2-2-0	Sengul Ozokcu	UD		1997-05-02	Randers Hallen, Randers, Denmark	
3	Win	2-1-0	Rubie Thompson	TKO		1997-02-07	Ukrainian Cultural Center, Somerset	
2	Win	1-1-0	Laurie Simms	TKO		1996-11-15	Ukrainian Cultural Center, Somerset	
1	Loss	0-1-0	Anissa Zamarron	TKO		1995-06-02	Starlite Theatre, Latham	
