= Colleen Smith (disambiguation) =

Colleen Smith was a Canadian baseball player.

Colleen Smith may also refer to:

- Colleen Smith (boxer) (See Sonya Emery)
- Colleen Smith (puppeteer) (See That Puppet Game Show)

== See also ==
- Colleen Clinkenbeard, (born 1980, Colleen Smith Clinkenbeard), American voice actress
