= Michele Aboro =

British female boxer

- Born: 17 July 1967 (age 59); London, England
- Height: 5 ft 4 1/2 in (164 cm)
- Division: Super-bantamweight
- Reach: 67 in (170 cm)
- Style: Muay Thai, Kickboxing, Boxing

Professional boxing record
- Total: 21
- Wins: 21
- By knockout: 12
- Losses: 0

Kickboxing record
- Total: 36
- Wins: 32
- By knockout: 23
- Losses: 3
- By knockout: 2
- Draws: 1

Mixed martial arts record
- Total: 1
- Wins: 0
- Losses: 1
- By submission: 1

Other information
- Boxing record from BoxRec
- Mixed martial arts record from Sherdog

Michele Aboro (born 17 July 1967) is a British former professional boxer who competed from 1995 to 2001. She retired an undefeated world champion, having held the WIBF super-bantamweight title from 2000 to 2001.

Michele Aboro, along with her countrywoman Michelle Sutcliffe and German Regina Halmich, became an important figure in European women's boxing, helping raise awareness about female participation in a traditionally male sport.

She was inducted into the International Women's Boxing Hall of Fame in 2020.

== Professional career ==
On 4 March 1995 she debuted as a professional boxer, with a first round knockout win over Marleen Lambert in Belgium. As a matter of a fact, her first three professional fights were held in different European countries (Belgium, Italy and Hungary) and they were all first-round knockout wins for Aboro. Her fourth fight, on 19 October 1996 against Severine Grandsire, was her first fight in Germany, and Aboro won by a sixth-round technical knockout.

Aboro had one more win, and then, on 29 November 1997, she met future world champion Daisy Lang, defeating Lang by a six-round decision.

On 22 August 1998 Aboro fought Brigitte Pastor for the vacant WIBF European Super Bantamweight title, knocking out Pastor in five rounds to win her first professional belt. She defended her title once, knocking out Galina Gumliiska in eight rounds on 28 November, then followed that win with four more wins in a row, before obtaining her first world title opportunity. Aboro became a world champion when she fought Eva Jones, on 5 February 2000, knocking Jones out in round ten to become the WIBF's world Super Bantamweight champion.

Then came Downtown Leona Brown's challenge. Aboro met the future world champion on 13 June that year, defeating Brown by a ten-round decision.

After two, non-title wins, she faced the highly touted contender Kelsey Jeffries, who had 10 wins and only 2 losses coming into their bout, for her second world championship defence. Aboro defended the title successfully against Jeffries on 10 February 2001, with a ten-round decision win.

After one more non-title win, Aboro made what has been, to date, her last fight. On 24 November that year she beat Nadia Debras, who she had previously beaten, by a ten-round decision, to retain her world title for the third time.

Aboro has not officially announced her retirement. However, should she decide to remain inactive and, ultimately, to retire from boxing, she would join Rocky Marciano and a handful of others in boxing's history to retire as an undefeated world champion.

As of 2019, Aboro is a resident of Amsterdam, Netherlands.

== Professional boxing record ==
21 fights	21 wins	0 losses
By knockout	12	0
By decision	9	0

No.	Result	Record	Opponent	Type	Round, time	Date	Location	Notes
21	Win	21–0	Nadia Debras	UD	10	24 Nov 2001	Universum Gym, Berlin, Germany	Retained WIBF super bantamweight title
20	Win	20–0	Krisztina Stefula	TKO	3 (6)	16 Jun 2001	Kisstadion, Budapest, Hungary	
19	Win	19–0	Kelsey Jeffries	UD	10	10 Feb 2001	Estrel Convention Centre, Berlin, Germany	Retained WIBF super bantamweight title
18	Win	18–0	Krisztina Horvai	PTS	6	5 Dec 2000	Universum Gym, Hamburg, Germany	
17	Win	17–0	Marina Kozerod	RTD	2 (6)	1 Oct 2000	Universum Gym, Hamburg, Germany	
16	Win	16–0	Leona Brown	UD	10	13 May 2000	Sartory Saale, Cologne, Germany	Retained WIBF super bantamweight title
15	Win	15–0	Eva Jones	UD	10	5 Feb 2000	Rhein-Ruhr Halle, Duisburg, Germany	Won vacant WIBF super bantamweight title
14	Win	14–0	Nadia Debras	PTS	6	27 Nov 1999	Hansehalle, Lübeck, Germany	
13	Win	13–0	Dorota Kosatka	KO	1 (6)	18 Sep 1999	Maritim Hotel, Stuttgart, Germany	
12	Win	12–0	Anastasia Toktaulova	PTS	6	22 May 1999	Sportpalace, Budapest, Hungary	
11	Win	11–0	Renata Fuskova	KO	1 (6)	13 Mar 1999	Hansehalle, Lübeck, Germany	
10	Win	10–0	Galina Gumliiska	KO	8 (10)	28 Nov 1998	Hansehalle, Lübeck, Germany	Retained WIBF European super bantamweight title
9	Win	9–0	Brigitte Pastor	KO	5 (10)	22 Aug 1998	Sport und Erholungszentrum, Berlin, Germany	Won vacant WIBF European super bantamweight title
8	Win	8–0	Nadia Debras	TKO	4 (6)	2 May 1998	Hansehalle, Lübeck, Germany	
7	Win	7–0	Krisztina Horvai	PTS	6	7 Mar 1998	Sartory-Saal, Cologne, Germany	
6	Win	6–0	Daisy Lang	PTS	6	29 Nov 1997	Rheinstrandhalle, Karlsruhe, Germany	
5	Win	5–0	Krisztina Krek	KO	2 (4)	26 Apr 1997	Leipzig, Germany	
4	Win	4–0	Severine Grandsire	TKO	6 (6)	19 Oct 1996	Zoo-Gesellschaftshaus, Frankfurt, Germany	
3	Win	3–0	Szilvia Porteleki	KO	1 (4)	9 Mar 1996	Budapest, Hungary	
2	Win	2–0	Donatella Todde	KO	1 (4)	11 May 1995	Germany	
1	Win	1–0	Marleen Lambert	KO	1 (4)	4 Mar 1995	Jabbeke, Belgium	

== Kickboxing record ==
Kickboxing record (incomplete)
32 wins (23 KOs), 3 losses, 1 draws
Date	Result	Opponent	Event	Location	Method	Round	Time	Record
1995-09-10	Win	Miyuki Nojima	Dutch K-1 Tournament, Final	Amsterdam, Netherlands	TKO	1		
1995-09-10	Win	Fienie Klee	Dutch K-1 Tournament, Semi Final	Amsterdam, Netherlands	Points	3		
1995-06-11	Win	Stephanie Curtiss	ISKA World Championships, Finals	Moscow, Russia	Points	3		
Won ISKA World Championship.
1995-06-11	Win	Natasha Larionova	ISKA World Championships, Semi Finals	Moscow, Russia	Points	3		
1995-06-11	Win	Mary Shariyk	ISKA World Championships, Quarters Finals	Moscow, Russia	TKO			
1995-04-02	Win	Severine Grandsire		Amsterdam, Netherlands	TKO	3		
1994-00-00	Win	Fienie Klee			TKO	5		
1992-05-17	Loss	Lucia Rijker		Hamburg, Germany	TKO			
1992-00-00	Loss	Nancy Joseph						
1991-09-00	Win			Paris, France	KO	1		
International title.
1991-06-09	Loss	Lucia Rijker		Oldham, England	TKO	1		
IMTF World lightweight title.
1991-04-21	Draw	Lisa Howarth		London, England	Draw			
1990-00-00	Win	Ann Holmes		London, England	Points	5		
WTBP World title.
Legend: Win Loss Draw/No contest Notes
