= Yvonne Trevino =

American kickboxer and boxer (born 1967)

- Born: Yvonne Monique Trevino; 18 January 1967 (age 59); Westside Clinic Peoria, Arizona, United States
- Height: 5 ft 4 in (1.63 m)
- Weight: 118 lb (54 kg; 8.4 st)
- Division: Flyweight, Bantamweight, Featherweight
- Style: Southpaw Boxing, IKBA ISKA Kickboxing, Muay Thai Kickboxing

Professional boxing record
- Total: 15
- Wins: 9
- Losses: 5
- Draws: 1

Kickboxing record
- Total: 10
- Wins: 7
- Losses: 3

Other information
- Boxing record from BoxRec

Yvonne Trevino (born 18 January 1967) is a kickboxing and boxing champion from Peoria, Arizona, United States. She was inducted into the International Women's Boxing Hall of Fame in 2023.

== Career ==
On April 20, 1995, at the Aladdin Casino in Las Vegas, Nevada Trevino was invited for an opportunity to fight in the first all-women's card for the new WIBF Women's International Boxing Federation in her third boxing bout. Trevino caused what perhaps could be described as women's boxing's first major upset, technically knocking out the popular and well-known German fighter Regina Halmich ringside doctors stopped the fight after Regina suffered a major cut under her eye from a four-round, knockdown action. Trevino had suffered a broken left hand in the first round worried the fight would be stopped she continued on and became the new WIBF world Flyweight champion.

On April 16, 1997, after being inactive for about a year, Trevino accepted a nationally televised bout on ABC's Wide World of Sports matched against Brenda Rouse, a fighter from the stable of well known professional boxer Tommy Morrison; the bout was stopped in the first round, after Rouse against the ropes failed to respond to a flurry of punches.

== Kickboxing record ==
Kickboxing & Muay Thai record
7 wins (5 (T)KOs), 3 losses
Date	Result	Opponent	Event	Location	Method	Round	Time	Record
1995-12-09	Win	(South Korea) Kim Messer	International Muay Thai Event	Fresno, California, United States	Win	10		7–3–0
Won the International Muay Thai Organization (IMTO) Bantamweight Championship
1995-11-25	Win	(United Kingdom) Anne Quinlan	Muay Thai event	Las Vegas, Nevada, United States	TKO (Doctor Stoppage)	2		6–3–0
1995-03-13	Loss	(South Korea) Kim Messer	ISKA event	Santa Cruz, California, United States	Loss	9		5–3–0
ISKA Women's World Light Atomweight Freestyle Kickboxing Championship Freestyle rules
1994-08-27	Loss	(United States) Fredia Gibbs	Muay Thai event	Los Angeles, California, US	Loss			5–2–0
1993-11-19	Win	(United States) Lapin Padilla	IKBA US State Kickboxing	United States	TKO			5–1–0
Won US Featherweight Kickboxing Championship
1993-10-03	Loss	(United States) Fredia Gibbs	Muay Thai event	Simi Valley, California, United States	Loss	5		4–1–0
1993-07-10	Win	(United States) Lonnie Shelby	Arizona State Kickboxing	Phoenix, Arizona, United States	Decision			4–0
Won the Arizona State Kickboxing Championship
1993-06-19	Win	(United States) Cynthia Prouder	Kickboxing event	United States	Decision			3–0
1993-05-25	Win	(United States) Lonnie Shelby	Kickboxing Event	Tucson, Arizona, United States	TKO			2–0
1993-05-15	Win	(United States) Lamour Myriah	Kickboxing event	Phoenix, Arizona, United States	KO			1–0
Legend: Win Loss Draw/No contest Notes

== Professional boxing record ==
15 fights	9 wins	5 losses
By knockout	0	0
By decision	9	5
Draws	1	

No.	Result	Record	Opponent	Type	Round, time	Date	Location	Notes
15	Loss		(United States) Kelsey Jeffries	UD		2001-05-06	(United States) Celebrity Theater, Phoenix	
14	Win		(United States) Suzanne Riccio-Major	TKO		1999-05-28	(United States) Orleans Hotel & Casino, Las Vegas	International Female Boxers Association World bantamweight title
13	Win		(United States) Delia Gonzalez	UD		1999-04-16	(United States) Orleans Hotel & Casino, Las Vegas	
12	Loss		(United States) Kathy Williams	UD		1998-11-17	(United States) Freeman Coliseum, San Antonio	
11	Loss		(United States) Para Draine	SD		1998-08-08	(United States) Spirit Lake Casino, St Michael	International Women's Boxing Federation World flyweight title
10	Loss		(United States) Bridgett Riley	UD		1998-02-15	(United States) Grand Casino, Biloxi	International Female Boxers Association World bantamweight title
9	Win		(United States) Suzanne Riccio-Major	UD		1997-08-02	(United States) Grand Casino, Biloxi	Vacant International Female Boxers Association World bantamweight title (Trevino was stripped of WIBF Title by Sanctioning body Jimmy Finn for pursuing the IFBA title)
8	Win		(United States) Jolene Blackshear	TKO		1997-05-17	(United States) Fantasy Springs Casino, Indio	
7	Win		(United States) Akiya Griggs	TKO		1997-04-29	(United States) Club Rio, Tempe	
6	Win		(United States) Brenda Rouse			1997-04-19	(United States) Las Vegas Hilton, Las Vegas	
5	Win		(United States) Christine Sullivan	TKO		1996-09-21	(United States) Harrah's Laughlin, Laughlin	
4	Draw		(United States) Delia Gonzalez	TD		1996-06-01	(United States) Boulder Station Hotel, Las Vegas	Women's International Boxing Federation World flyweight title (unsanctioned)
3	Win		(Germany) Regina Halmich	RTD		1995-04-20	(United States) Aladdin Hotel & Casino, Las Vegas	Vacant Women's International Boxing Federation World flyweight title
2	Loss		(United States) Bridgett Riley	SD		1994-04-08	(United States) Hilton Hotel, Laughlin	
1	Win		(United States) Chris Kreuz	SD		1993-09-18	(United States) Palmer Auditorium, Davenport	
