= Johanna Peña Álvarez =

Dominican Republic boxer (born 1983)

Johanna Peña-Álvarez
Personal information
- Nickname: La Bailarina
- Nationality: Dominican
- Born: Joanna Altagracia Peña Alvarez; 6 January 1983 (age 43) Santo Domingo, Dominican Republic
- Height: 5 ft 4 in (163 cm)
- Weight: Flyweight

Boxing career
- Stance: Southpaw

Boxing record
- Total fights: 20
- Wins: 15
- Win by KO: 10
- Losses: 3
- Draws: 2

Johanna Peña-Álvarez (born 6 January 1983) is a Dominican former professional boxer who competed from 2000 to 2004. She challenged once for the WIBF flyweight title in 2004.

== Early and personal life ==
Álvarez began boxing at the age of 13 and turned professional at 14 under the tutelage of her father Ruddy Peña.

== Career ==
Álvarez made her professional debut at the age of seventeen, on 29 June 2000, winning a second-round technical knockout (TKO) over Natali Lara. She won her second bout, before losing a six-round unanimous decision to Gisselle Salandy on 8 August 2000. Álvarez would go 12–0–1 in her next 13 fights, before losing a ten-round decision to WIBF flyweight champion Regina Halmich on 17 January 2004 in Germany.

Álvarez would return to the ring on 19 March 2004, fighting to a six-round draw with Delia Gonzalez. In her next fight, Álvarez lost a six-round unanimous decision to future WIBA flyweight champion Melinda Cooper.

== Professional boxing record ==
20 fights	15 wins	3 losses
By knockout	10	0
By decision	5	3
Draws	2	

No.	Result	Record	Opponent	Type	Round, time	Date	Location	Notes
20	Loss	15–3–2	(United States) Melinda Cooper	UD	6	23 Jul 2004	(United States) Agua Caliente Casino, Rancho Mirage, California, US	
19	Draw	15–2–2	(United States) Delia Gonzalez	PTS	6	15 May 2004	(United States) Speaking Rock Casino, El Paso, Texas, US	
18	Win	15–2–1	(United States) Anissa Zamarron	UD	8	19 Mar 2004	(United States) International Ballroom, Houston, Texas, US	
17	Loss	14–2–1	(Germany) Regina Halmich	UD	10	17 Jan 2004	Dm-Arena, Karlsruhe, Germany	For WIBF flyweight title
16	Draw	14–1–1	(United States) Elena Reid	PTS	4	7 Nov 2003	(United States) Desert Diamond Casino, Tucson, Arizona, US	
15	Win	14–1	(Dominican Republic) Angela Garcia	KO	1 (4)	19 Dec 2002	Coliseo Carlos 'Teo' Cruz, Santo Domingo, Dominican Republic	
14	Win	13–1	(Dominican Republic) Zuleidy Diaz	TKO	3 (4)	7 Nov 2002	Coliseo Carlos 'Teo' Cruz, Santo Domingo, Dominican Republic	
13	Win	12–1	(Dominican Republic) Diana Carolina Garcia Dominguez	PTS	6	20 Sep 2002	Coliseo Carlos 'Teo' Cruz, Santo Domingo, Dominican Republic	
12	Win	11–1	(Dominican Republic) Angela Garcia	PTS	4	29 Nov 2001	Santo Domingo, Dominican Republic	
11	Win	10–1	(Dominican Republic) Liliana Martinez	PTS	6	28 Sep 2001	Santo Domingo, Dominican Republic	
10	Win	9–1	(Dominican Republic) Zuleidy Diaz	TKO	1 (6)	1 Sep 2001	Santo Domingo, Dominican Republic	
9	Loss	8–1	(Trinidad and Tobago) Jisselle Salandy	PTS	6	5 Aug 2001	Santo Domingo, Dominican Republic	
8	Win	8–0	(Dominican Republic) Zuleidy Diaz	TKO	3 (4)	17 Jul 2001	Santo Domingo, Dominican Republic	
7	Win	7–0	(Dominican Republic) Escarlyn Fulgencio	TKO	3 (4)	30 Apr 2001	Santo Domingo, Dominican Republic	
6	Win	6–0	(Dominican Republic) Liliana Martinez	PTS	4	8 Mar 2001	Santo Domingo, Dominican Republic	
5	Win	5–0	(Dominican Republic) Geraldina Morillo	KO	1 (4)	29 Nov 2000	Santo Domingo, Dominican Republic	
4	Win	4–0	(Dominican Republic) Rossy Gonzalez	KO	1 (4)	13 Sep 2000	Santo Domingo, Dominican Republic	
3	Win	3–0	(Dominican Republic) Yesenia Casanova	KO	2 (4)	12 Aug 2000	La Romana, Dominican Republic	
2	Win	2–0	(Dominican Republic) Claribel Ferreras	KO	2 (4)	30 Jul 2000	Santo Domingo, Dominican Republic	
1	Win	1–0	(Dominican Republic) Natalie Lara	KO	2 (4)	29 Jun 2000	Santo Domingo, Dominican Republic	
