= Elena Reid =

American martial artist (born 1981)

- Born: November 1, 1981 (age 44); Phoenix, Arizona
- Other names: Baby Doll
- Height: 5 ft 2 in (1.57 m)
- Weight: 115 lb (52 kg; 8.2 st)
- Division: Strawweight; Flyweight
- Reach: 64 in (160 cm)
- Style: Boxing
- Stance: Southpaw
- Fighting out of: Tempe, Arizona
- Team: Power Team MMA; Arizona Combat Sports

Professional boxing record
- Total: 31
- Wins: 19
- By knockout: 5
- Losses: 6
- Draws: 6

Mixed martial arts record
- Total: 5
- Wins: 4
- By knockout: 4
- Losses: 1
- By knockout: 1

Other information
- Boxing record from BoxRec
- Mixed martial arts record from Sherdog

Elena A. Reid (born November 1, 1981) is an American former boxer and mixed martial artist. She is a former WIBA and IFBA Flyweight Champion.

== Early life ==
Reid was born in Phoenix, Arizona, in 1981. Reid attended St. Mary's High School (Phoenix, Arizona) and played on an all-boys youth soccer team when she was a young girl. Reid participated in Karate and Boxing, and won an Arizona State Kickboxing Title at age 17.

== Boxing career ==
Making her professional boxing debut on April 18, 2000, in Phoenix, Elena "Baby Doll" Reid defeated Jo Ellen Caldwell by a four-round decision. Her first career win was followed shortly thereafter by her first career defeat, when she was beaten by Layla McCarter in a four-round unanimous decision. McCarter, who had improved her own record to 3 wins, 4 losses and 1 draw with her victory, went on to become the youngest boxer ever to win an IFBA World Title on October 7, 2000. Reid got her first career knockout win on August 26, 2000, by defeating Jessica Elgin Combs in the first round of their fight at the Mandalay Bay Resort and Casino in Las Vegas, Nevada.

On September 11, 2004, at DM Arena in Karlsruhe, Germany, Elena Reid fought her first title fight when she took on local favorite and German media darling Regina Halmich, for Halmich's WIBF Flyweight Title. Over 10 rounds the match was a draw, and Halmich remained the title holder. The outcome left Reid with a 14-1-5 (4 KO) record, while moving Halmich to 45-1-1 (15 KOs).

After four more fights, Elena Reid received a rematch against Halmich. On December 3, 2005, the two engaged in another closely contested bout in Germany, for the WIBF Flyweight Title. This time, the judges scored the 10-round fight all for Regina Halmich.

On August 31, 2006, Reid won the vacant WIBA Flyweight title by defeating Mary "The Heat" Ortega in a ten-round unanimous decision at Harveys Lake Tahoe Casino & Resort, in Stateline, NV. Reid improved her record to (18-3-5), while Ortega fell to (28-3-1).

As of 2007, Elena Reid was trained by Chris Ben and lived and trained in Las Vegas, Nevada. When not training, she was a student at UNLV majoring in marketing.

On July 2, 2007, Reid won the IFBA World Flyweight Championship by defeating Shin Hi Choi.

Reid faced France's Nadya Hokmi on June 5, 2010, for the vacant WBF Women's Super Flyweight Championship. Reid lost the fight by unanimous decision. Reid wore a knee brace during the fight due to injuries suffered prior to an April 2010 mixed martial arts bout.

== Mixed martial arts career ==
On December 28, 2007, Reid made her professional MMA debut against Tammie Schneider and won the fight by TKO in the second round.

She faced Stephanie Palmer at SuperFights MMA - Night of Combat on October 11, 2008. She won the fight by TKO in the first round.

She faced Michelle Waterson at Apache Gold: Extreme Beatdown on April 11, 2009. Reid won the fight by TKO in the second round.

On October 24, 2009, Reid faced Masako Yoshida for the Sovereign Nations MMA Women's Flyweight Championship at EB - Beatdown at 4 Bears 5 in New Town, North Dakota. She defeated Yoshida by TKO when the referee stopped the fight in the third round after a series of unanswered punches.

Reid was set to defend her SNMMA title for the first time at Playboy Fight Night 4 on April 17, 2010, against Alyx Luck. The fight was canceled after Luck falsified pre-fight bloodwork and was subsequently suspended. Reid faced Catia Vitoria instead and was defeated by TKO in the third round, losing the SNMMA title in the process.

In June 2010 Reid suffered a torn MCL and ruptured ACL in her left knee prior to the fight with Vitoria. As a result, Reid was forced to withdraw from the Bellator 115-pound women's tournament.

In an interview on April 15, 2011, Reid confirmed that she had chosen not to have surgery on her injured knee and would be retiring from MMA and boxing.

In 2016, Reid was inducted into the International Women's Boxing Hall of Fame.

== Personal life ==
Reid is of Filipino descent.

Reid was set to marry fellow MMA fighter Ray Steinbeiss on October 29, 2011.

Outside of fighting, Reid is involved with the Community Future Generation Project (FGP), a non-profit organization in Phoenix, Arizona, and also teaches fitness classes for children in the area.

== Professional boxing record ==
31 fights	19 wins	6 losses
By knockout	5	1
By decision	14	5
By disqualification	0	0
Draws	6	

No.	Result	Record	Opponent	Type	Round, time	Date	Location	Notes
31	Loss	19-6-6	(France) Nadya Hokmi	UD	10	Jun 5, 2010	(France) Stade Joffre Lefebvre, Lingolsheim, Bas-Rhin	for vacant WBF World female super flyweight title
30	Loss	19-5-6	(Germany) Susi Kentikian	UD	10	March 20, 2009	(Germany) Sporthalle, Alsterdorf	for WBA World female flyweight title & Women's IBF World flyweight title
29	Draw	19-4-6	(United States) Ava Knight	PTS	6	June 12, 2008	(United States) Mohegan Sun Casino, Uncasville, Connecticut	
28	Loss	19-4-5	(United States) Eileen Olszewski	MD	10	February 28, 2008	(United States) Roseland Ballroom, New York City, New York	lost WIBA World flyweight title
27	Win	19-3-5	(South Korea) Choi Shin-hee	UD	10	July 2, 2007	(United States) Pechanga Resort & Casino, Temecula, California	won IFBA World flyweight title
26	Win	18-3-5	(United States) Mary Ortega	UD	10	August 31, 2006	(United States) Harveys Lake Tahoe, Stateline, Nevada	won WIBA World flyweight title
25	Loss	17-3-5	(Germany) Regina Halmich	UD	10	December 3, 2005	(Germany) Bordelandhalle, Magdeburg	for WIBA World flyweight title
24	Win	17-2-5	(United States) Stephanie Dobbs	UD	6	July 2, 2005	(United States) Reno Events Center, Reno, Nevada	
23	Loss	16-2-5	(Jamaica) Alicia Ashley	TKO	7	March 26, 2005	(United States) Harrah's, Laughlin, Nevada	
22	Win	16-1-5	(United States) Lakeysha Williams	KO	5	January 29, 2005	(United States) Silverton Las Vegas, Las Vegas, Nevada	
21	Win	15-1-5	(United States) Yvonne Chavez	UD	5	November 20, 2004	(United States) Sky Ute Casino, Ignacio, Colorado	
20	Draw	14-1-5	(Germany) Regina Halmich	SD	10	September 11, 2004	(Germany) Dm-Arena, Rheinstetten	for Women's IBF World flyweight title
19	Draw	14-1-4	(United States) Johanna Pena Alvarez	PTS	10	November 7, 2003	(United States) Desert Diamond Casino, Tucson, Arizona	
18	Win	14-1-3	(United States) Linda Tenberg	UD	6	September 26, 2003	(United States) Celebrity Theater, Phoenix, Arizona	
17	Draw	13-1-3	(Mexico) Mariana Juárez	PTS	6	June 28, 2003	(United States) Celebrity Theater, Phoenix, Arizona	
16	Win	13-1-2	(United States) Linda Tenberg	UD	6	February 11, 2003	(United States) Celebrity Theater, Phoenix, Arizona	
15	Win	12-1-2	(United States) Lakeysha Williams	UD	6	November 19, 2002	(United States) Dodge Theater, Phoenix, Arizona	
14	Win	11-1-2	(United States) Terri Lynn Cruz	UD	6	October 1, 2002	(United States) Dodge Theater, Phoenix, Arizona	
13	Win	10-1-2	(United States) Yolanda Gonzalez	TKO	5 (6)	July 19, 2002	(United States) Yakama Legends Casino, Toppenish, Washington	
12	Win	9-1-2	(United States) Tracy Moulton	UD	4	June 7, 2002	(United States) Rawhide Arena, Scottsdale, Arizona	
11	Win	8-1-2	(United States) Elena Luz Rodriguez	UD	4	Apr 20, 2002	(United States) MGM Grand Las Vegas, Nevada	
10	Win	7-1-2	(United States) Monica Michel Lopez	UD	6	April 5, 2002	(United States) Celebrity Theater, Phoenix, Arizona	
9	Draw	6-1-2	(United States) Elena Luz Rodriguez	PTS	4	January 25, 2002	(United States) Avi Resort & Casino, Laughlin, Nevada	
8	Win	6-1-1	(United States) Valerie Williams	TKO	1 (4)	September 25, 2001	(United States) Midnight Rodeo, Phoenix, Arizona	
7	Draw	5-1-1	(United States) Yvonne Caples	PTS	4	January 28, 2001	(United States) Greyhound Park, Phoenix, Arizona	
6	Win	5-1-0	(United States) Bertha Gonzalez	UD	4	November 19, 2000	(United States) Midnight Rodeo, Phoenix, Arizona	
5	Win	4-1-0	(United States) Brandy Leon	TKO	1 (4)	October 10, 2000	(United States) Webb Theater, Phoenix, Arizona	
4	Win	3-1-0	(United States) Yvonne Caples	UD	4	October 1, 2000	(United States) Celebrity Theater, Phoenix, Arizona	
3	Win	2-1-0	(United States) Jessica Elgin Combs	TKO	1 (4)	August 26, 2000	(United States) Mandalay Bay Events Center, Las Vegas, Nevada	
2	Loss	1-1-0	(United States) Layla McCarter	UD	4	July 16, 2000	(United States) Arizona Charlie's Boulder, Las Vegas, Nevada	
1	Win	1-0-0	(United States) Jo Ellen Caldwell	UD	4	April 18, 2000	(United States) Midnight Rodeo, Phoenix, Arizona	

== Mixed martial arts record ==
Professional record breakdown
5 matches	4 wins	1 loss
By knockout	4	1

Res.	Record	Opponent	Method	Event	Date	Round	Time	Location	Notes
Loss	4–1	Catia Vitoria	TKO (punches)	Playboy Fight Night 4	April 17, 2010	3	3:59	New Town, North Dakota, United States	Lost Sovereign Nations MMA Women's Flyweight Championship
Win	4–0	Masako Yoshida	TKO (punches)	EB - Beatdown at 4 Bears 5	October 24, 2009	3	2:35	New Town, North Dakota, United States	Won Sovereign Nations MMA Women's Flyweight Championship
Win	3–0	Michelle Waterson	TKO (punches)	Apache Gold: Extreme Beatdown	April 18, 2009	2	1:50	Phoenix, Arizona, United States	
Win	2–0	Stephanie Palmer	TKO (punch to the body)	SuperFights MMA - Night of Combat 2	October 11, 2008	1	0:53	Las Vegas, Nevada, United States	
Win	1–0	Tammie Schneider	TKO (punches)	IFO - Fireworks in the Cage IV	December 28, 2007	2	2:05	Las Vegas, Nevada, United States	

== Championships ==
- Former Sovereign Nations MMA Women's Flyweight Champion
- Former WIBA Flyweight Champion
- Former IFBA Flyweight Champion
