= Russ Hogue =

American kickboxer (born 1974)

- Born: Russ Hogue; December 26, 1974 (age 51); Belleville, Illinois, U.S.
- Nationality: (United States) American
- Division: Heavyweight
- Style: Karate, kickboxing
- Stance: Orthodox

Kickboxing record
- Total: 27
- Wins: 20
- By knockout: 9
- Losses: 6
- Draws: 1
- No contests: 0

Russ Hogue (born December 26, 1974) is an American kickboxer from Belleville, Illinois. He started training in martial arts under three-time world kickboxing champion Jim Boucher in Belleville, Illinois. He was also a member of a national karate competition team with other notable athletes such as Bridgett Riley (World Boxing/Kickboxing Champion), Patrick Riley (mixed martial arts champion), and Donny Reinhardt (North American Kickboxing Champion).

Hogue won the St. Louis Golden Gloves title in 1993 and 1994 along with several other kickboxing titles: KICK MO State Champion, USA-KIA MO State Champion (two weight classes), WKF and IKA United States Champion.

Throughout the late 1980s and early 1990s he was a successful karate competitor, winning several national karate tournaments. For a period of four years, he was the #1 ranked sparring competitor in the region. He was also an alternate member of the 1991 Pan Am Games Karate Team.

In February 2007 he was inducted into the MMA Hall of Fame with Bridgett Riley and Patrick Riley. He was awarded his 5th degree blackbelt by Grand Master Rich Osborn.

== Post-fight career ==
Hogue retired in 2002. He graduated from Southern Illinois University with a bachelor's degree in Management Information Systems. With a focus on building a successful business and academic career, he completed a master's in Business Administration from the University of Phoenix (St. Louis, Missouri) in 2003. In 2015, he earned the doctor of philosophy (PhD) in Organizational Psychology from Walden University (Minneapolis, Minnesota). His academic research has focused on leadership and building successful virtual teams. In 2021, he graduated from Harvard University with a Master of Liberal Arts in Extension Studies in Journalism.

He has also had a career working for the largest I.T. organizations in the world (IBM, Microsoft and Dell) with a focus on enabling technologies that support the virtual workforce.
