= Ria Ramnarine =

Trinidadian and Tobagonian boxer (born 1978)

Personal information
- Born: 12 October 1978 (age 47) Carapichaima, Trinidad and Tobago
- Height: 5 ft 2 in (157 cm)
- Weight: Mini-flyweight; Light-flyweight; Flyweight

Boxing career
- Stance: Orthodox

Boxing record
- Total fights: 20
- Wins: 14
- Win by KO: 2
- Losses: 4
- Draws: 1
- No contests: 1

Ria Ramnarine (born 12 October 1978) is a Trinidadian and Tobagonian former professional boxer who competed from 1999 to 2012. During her career, she held world titles in two weight-classes; the WIBA minimumweight title from 2005 to 2006, the WIBF minimumweight and WIBA light flyweight titles in 2011. She also challenged once for the WBA female minimumweight title in 2010. She was Trinidad and Tobago's first female world champion. Ramnarine was inducted into the International Women's Boxing Hall of Fame in 2017.

== Professional boxing record ==
20 fights	14 wins	4 losses
By knockout	2	2
By decision	12	2
Draws	1	
No contests	1	

No.	Result	Record	Opponent	Type	Round, time	Date	Location	Notes
20	Win	14–4–1 (1)	(Guyana) Stephaney George	UD	6	2 Sep 2012	Woodbrook Youth Facility, Port of Spain, Trinidad and Tobago	
19	Loss	13–4–1 (1)	(Russia) Anastasia Toktaulova	UD	10	29 Jul 2011	Jean Pierre Sports Complex, Port of Spain, Trinidad and Tobago	Lost WIBA light-flyweight title; For WBC International female light-flyweight title
18	Win	13–3–1 (1)	(Colombia) Olga Julio	SD	10	12 Feb 2011	Jean Pierre Sports Complex, Port of Spain, Trinidad and Tobago	Won vacant WIBA light-flyweight title; Won vacant WIBF, and GBU minimumweight titles
17	Draw	12–3–1 (1)	(Japan) Etsuko Tada	MD	10	24 Apr 2010	Central Region Indoor Sports Arena, Chaguanas, Trinidad and Tobago	For WBA female, and WIBA interim minimumweight titles
16	Win	12–3 (1)	(Colombia) Paulina Cardona	UD	8	2 Jan 2010	Central Regional Indoor Sports Arena, Chaguanas, Trinidad and Tobago	
15	Win	11–3 (1)	(Venezuela) Ana Fernandez	TD	9 (10)	31 Jul 2009	Central Region Indoor Sports Arena, Chaguanas, Trinidad and Tobago	Won WBA interim female minimumweight title
14	Win	10–3 (1)	(Puerto Rico) Nancy Bonilla	TKO	8 (10)	7 Mar 2009	Jean Pierre Sports Complex, Port of Spain, Trinidad and Tobago	Won WIBA interim light-flyweight title
13	Loss	9–3 (1)	(Germany) Regina Halmich	TKO	6 (10)	9 Sep 2006	Börderlandhalle, Magdeburg, Germany	For WIBF flyweight title
12	Win	9–2 (1)	(Guyana) Stephaney George	UD	10	14 Jul 2006	Chaguanas, Trinidad and Tobago	Retained WIBA minimumweight title
11	Win	8–2 (1)	(United States) Yvonne Caples	SD	10	28 May 2005	Jean Pierre Sports Complex, Port of Spain, Trinidad and Tobago	Won vacant WIBA minimumweight title
10	Win	7–2 (1)	(Trinidad and Tobago) Adanna Francis	UD	6	26 Dec 2004	Queen's Park Oval, Port of Spain, Trinidad and Tobago	
9	Win	6–2 (1)	(United States) Deidre Yumi Hamaguchi	UD	8	31 Jul 2004	Central Region Indoor Sports Arena, Chaguanas, Trinidad and Tobago	
8	Win	5–2 (1)	(Trinidad and Tobago) Vicki Boodram	UD	6	12 Jul 2003	Central Region Indoor Sports Arena, Chaguanas, Trinidad and Tobago	
7	NC	4–2 (1)	(Guyana) Shondell Thomas	NC	8	4 May 2002	Cliff Anderson Sports Hall, Georgetown, Guyana	
6	Win	4–2	(Guyana) Shondell Thomas	SD	8	26 Dec 2001	Cliff Anderson Sports Hall, Georgetown, Guyana	
5	Loss	3–2	(United States) Leona Brown	TKO	4 (6)	27 Jul 2001	(United States) Civic Center, Niagara Falls, New York, US	
4	Win	3–1	(Trinidad and Tobago) Adanna Francis	PTS	3	10 Mar 2001	Port of Spain, Trinidad and Tobago	
3	Win	2–1	(Trinidad and Tobago) Wilma Skeate	PTS	6	10 Feb 2001	San Fernando, Trinidad and Tobago	
2	Loss	1–1	(Netherlands Antilles) Claudette Alexander	PTS	6	5 Aug 2000	Landsome Bowl Cultural Centre, The Valley, Anguilla	
1	Win	1–0	(Trinidad and Tobago) Wilma Skeate	KO	3	3 Dec 1999	Port of Spain, Trinidad and Tobago	
