= Delia Gonzalez =

American boxer (born 1971)

Personal information
- Nickname: Chiquita
- Nationality: American
- Born: Delia Gonzales; November 20, 1971 (age 54) Anthony, New Mexico, U.S.
- Weight: Flyweight

Boxing career
- Stance: Orthodox

Boxing record
- Total fights: 28
- Wins: 13
- Win by KO: 3
- Losses: 9
- Draws: 5
- No contests: 1

Delia 'Chiquita' Gonzalez (born November 20, 1971) is an American former flyweight female boxer. She has a record of 13-9-4 with 3 knockout wins, although several of her losses have been controversial.

== Personal and early life ==
Gonzalez is Mexican-American, and trained at the gym under her father's guidance. Soon she earned the nickname Chiquita, after her favorite boxer, the former 2 time World flyweight champion Humberto "Chiquita" Gonzalez of Mexico.

== Career ==
As a professional, Delia began with a 4-round decision win over Lucy Tellez in Texas. A couple of fights later, she beat Gloria Ramirez twice, once by knockout in the 3rd, and once by decision in 4. Both fights again took place in Texas. Two more wins followed and a title shot came after that, and she beat Klee Fenie in Las Vegas to become the WIBF's world Flyweight champion. She defended her title against Anissa Zamarron winning on points, then met Phoenix's Yvonne Trevino which the judges called a technical draw (word used for tie in boxing). She later met Jolene Blackshear and lost the world title.

She traveled to Cologne, Germany in May 2000 for a bout against Regina Halmich, which she lost. She won four fights after her loss, including two wins over Yolanda Gonzalez.

Later, Gonzales fought in the bantamweight ranks, and in June 2003 lost a fight against Ada Vélez for the WIBA bantamweight title on a seventh-round disqualification. She has also managed boxer Rebecca Rodriguez.

On March 19, 2004, Gonzalez returned to the ring for a 6-round draw with Johanna Peña-Álvarez.

Gonzalez was inducted into the International Women's Boxing Hall of Fame in 2022.

== Professional boxing record ==
28 fights	13 wins	9 losses
By knockout	3	1
By decision	10	8
Draws	5	
No contests	1	

No.	Result	Record	Opponent	Type	Round, time	Date	Location	Notes
28	Draw		Johanna Peña-Álvarez	PTS		2004-05-15	Speaking Rock Casino, El Paso	
27	Loss		Ada Velez	DQ		2003-06-28	Seminole Casino, Coconut Creek	WIBA Bantamweight Title
26	Loss		Mary Ortega	UD		2002-11-20	Ameristar Casino, Kansas City	
25	Win		Yolanda Gonzalez	UD		2002-06-21	Convention Center, Waco	
24	Win		Juana Vega	UD		2002-05-17	Convention Center, Austin	
23	Loss		Wendy Rodriguez	MD		2002-04-27	Stratosphere Hotel & Casino, Las Vegas	
22	Draw		Yolanda Gonzalez	PTS		2002-02-01	Celebrity Theater, Phoenix	
21	Loss		Kathy Williams	UD		2001-04-12	Jacob Brown Auditorium, Brownsville	
20	Win		Imelda Arias	UD		2000-11-25	Artesia	
19	No contest		Jayla Ortiz	ND		2000-08-12	San Juan Pueblo	
18	Loss		Regina Halmich	MD		2000-05-13	Sartory Saale, Cologne	WIBF Super Flyweight Title
17	Draw		Kim Messer	TD		1999-12-03	Pechanga Entertainment Center, Temecula	
16	Loss		Yvonne Trevino			1999-04-16	Orleans Hotel & Casino, Las Vegas	
15	Loss		Jolene Blackshear	UD		1998-09-17	Grand Casino, Biloxi	IFBA Flyweight Title
14	Loss		Eva Jones	UD		1997-10-24	Lady Luck Casino, Lula	
13	Win		Tina Speakman	TKO		1997-08-29	El Paso	
12	Win		Segovia Concepcion	TKO		1997-06-07	Convention Center, Ruidoso	
11	Win		Anissa Zamarron	UD		1996-08-30	The Aladdin, Las Vegas	WIBF Light Flyweight Title
10	Draw		Yvonne Trevino	TD		1996-06-01	Boulder Station Hotel, Las Vegas	
9	Win		Anissa Zamarron	UD		1995-07-13	Intl. Convention Center, Brownsville	
8	Loss		Fienie Klee	UD		1995-04-20	Aladdin Hotel & Casino, Las Vegas	WIBF Super Flyweight Title
7	Loss		Helga Risoy	KO		1994-07-22	The Aladdin, Las Vegas	
6	Win		Carol Stinson	UD		1994-06-25	El Paso	
5	Win		Patricia Otero	UD		1994-05-24	El Paso	
4	Win		Gloria Ramirez	UD		1994-03-26	El Paso	
3	Win		Gloria Ramirez	TKO		1993-08-28	El Paso	
2	Draw		Helga Risoy	MD		1993-08-03	Riviera Hotel & Casino, Las Vegas	
1	Win		Lucy Tellez	PTS		1992-09-26	El Paso	

Preceded by Delia Gonzalez (Vacated)	WIBF World Super Flyweight Champion; November 25, 1994 – 1999 (Vacated)	Succeeded by Daisy Lang
Preceded by Yvonne Trevino (Vacated)	WIBF World Flyweight Champion; June 10, 1995 – December 7, 2007 (Vacated)	Succeeded by Susi Kentikian
Preceded by Delia Gonzalez (Vacated)	WIBF World Light Flyweight Champion; July 10, 1999 – 2002/2003 (Vacated)	Succeeded by Maria Jesús Rosa
