= Fredia Gibbs =

American martial artist (born 1963)

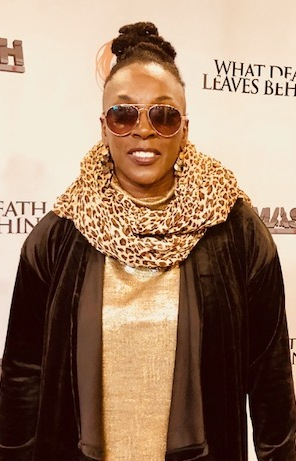
- Gibbs in 2018
- Born: July 8, 1963 (age 63); Chester, Pennsylvania, U.S.
- Other names: Cheetah / Lady Jack Johnson
- Height: 5 ft 7 in (1.70 m)
- Weight: 135 lb (61 kg; 9.6 st)
- Division: Lightweight; Welterweight
- Reach: 70.0 in (178 cm)
- Style: Boxing, Muay Thai Kickboxing
- Stance: Orthodox
- Fighting out of: North Hollywood, California, U.S.
- Team: Muay Thai Academy of North Hollywood
- Trainer: Kickboxing: Saekson Janjira, David Krapes, Ruben Urquidez, Boxing: Randy Shields, Terry Claybon, Bill Slayton
- Rank: black belt in Taekwondo
- Years active: 1975–2005

Professional boxing record
- Total: 12
- Wins: 9
- Losses: 2
- Draws: 1

Kickboxing record
- Total: 17
- Wins: 16
- By knockout: 15
- Losses: 0
- Draws: 1

Other information
- Boxing record from BoxRec

Fredia "The Cheetah" Gibbs (born July 8, 1963), is an American professional kickboxer and boxer, Martial artist and European basketball player who competed from 1975 to 2005. During her kickboxing career, she held three world titles ISKA, WKA, and WKF in two different divisions. Before embarking on her kickboxing career she was an All-American in basketball and track and field.

She became the first African-American female ISKA Undefeated World Kickboxing Champion. In 1994, she gained widespread recognition after an upset victory over World Champion Valérie Wiet-Henin of France at the "Battle of the Masters" Pay-Per-View event in San Jose, California. Gibbs went on to become one of the most dominant champions in the sport. She competed from 1991 to 1997, amassing a record of 16 wins, 0 losses, and 15 KOs, and three world titles. Additionally, Gibbs competed as a top contender in women's professional boxing from 1997 to 2005 with a record of 9 wins, 2 losses, and 1 draw. She is one of the two known survivors of serial killer Lonnie David Franklin Jr., who abducted and attempted to rape her in late 1993.

== Early years ==
Fredia Gibbs was born in Chester, Pennsylvania. She was given the nickname "The Cheetah" at school due to her performance in track. Chester High School named their track team "Chester's Cheetahs" after Gibbs.

After high school, Gibbs attended Temple University in Philadelphia where she was the recipient of two athletic scholarships in basketball and track. She attended Cabrini University on a basketball scholarship, and majored in marketing. She was invited to the United States Olympic Training Center in Colorado Springs to try out for the women's United States women's national basketball team but was cut during the second tryouts. Gibbs was selected Kodak All American for three consecutive years for basketball at Cabrini University. She later went on to play professional basketball in Germany, averaging almost 28 points, 15 rebounds, and 10 assists a season.

== Martial arts career ==
Gibbs began her instruction in Jeet Kune Do/Aikido fight style at Quiet Storm Martial Arts School in Chester, Pennsylvania. She was urged to learn martial arts by her uncle to rebuild her self confidence and self esteem, which suffered as a result of being bullied. She was trained by her uncle, part of a group of lethal martial artists including lawyers, judges, doctors, business leaders, and blue collar workers. Every Saturday, Fredia would spar with her uncle in a locked room. Her uncle would tell her to get a key that he placed behind him. Once she managed to obtain the key, her uncle awarded her a black belt. She continued to train and compete under Quiet Storm throughout high school and college, and she won three world championships in Tae Kwon Do by the time she graduated from Cabrini, with the last World Championship won in St. Petersburg, Florida, against an undefeated champion from Puerto Rico. Throughout these years, she competed and became a World Champion in martial arts while simultaneously excelling as an All-American in basketball and track.

== Professional basketball career ==
From age 12 until 1990, Fredia Gibbs competed in basketball, earning a reputation for transforming struggling programs into champions. At Chester High School, she played a pivotal role in turning a winless team into a division champion, district champion, and state semi-finalist. She earned All-County, All-State, and All-American honors while averaging 28 points, 5 rebounds, and 10 assists in her senior year. Gibbs remains Chester High School’s all-time leading scorer with 1,706 points.

In 1981, she received a basketball and track scholarship to Temple University but lost it after one season due to academic withdrawal. She later attended Cabrini University on a basketball scholarship, where she revitalized the women’s basketball program. To this day, Gibbs holds the title of Cabrini’s all-time leading scorer with 2,395 points, 901 rebounds, 680 assists and 318 steals points. Gibbs received All-American Honorable mention following the 1986 season then closed her career as the only player in Cabrini history to be named a Kodak All-American in 1987.

After leaving Cabrini, in 1988 she took her talents overseas for two year playing professional basketball in the European Women’s Professional Basketball League for Etzella in Luxembourg. She led the team to its first European Cup, dominating the court with averages of 28 points, 15 rebounds, and 10 assists per game leading the team in scoring and rebounding.

== Professional kickboxing career ==
In 1990, after moving to North Hollywood, California, Gibbs took up kickboxing at the Benny Urquidez's The Jet Kickboxing Training Center under the instruction of Lilly Rodriguez Urquidez, Rubin Urquidez and David Krapes. She later studied Muay Thai Kickboxing under the guidance of Sur Puk & Saekson Janjira of the Muay Thai Academy of America in North Hollywood. Her Muay Thai publicist was William Peele. Prior to this she had studied martial arts (Tae Kwon do/ Jeet kwon do/ Aikido) at Quiet Storm Martial arts school under the instruction of her uncle Master William Groce, Master Rick Berry, and Master Brown, in Chester Pennsylvania.

She amassed an impressive kickboxing record of 16-0-1 with 15 KOs. Her only draw came from an exhibition fight with a male opponent. In April 14, 1994, she defeated the "Most Dangerous Woman in the World", from Paris, France Valerie Henin in "The Battle of the Masters" Pay-Per-View event, capturing the ISKA World Championship. This victory made Gibbs the first African American female to hold the world kickboxing championship for the International Sport Karate Association.

== Professional boxing career ==
In 1997, Gibbs started boxing professionally. Her record was 9-2-1 (2 KO). She made her boxing debut January 23, 1997, in a four-round decision over Maria Fortaleza Recinos. Due to unfortunate scheduling, Gibbs entered the title fight against Leah Mellinger during the time she was filming the movie Knockout. The intense film schedule combined with the cross-country flight from Los Angeles to Atlantic City, New Jersey, was less than ideal, and Gibbs suffered her first loss. Gibbs said the loss to Mellinger inspired her to intensify her training to resume her journey to the top.

On January 15, 1999, Gibbs handed Las Vegas hometown favorite Hannah Fox her first loss in a six-round unanimous decision, shown live on ESPN2. On November 16, 2001, Gibbs fought a highly anticipated WIBA world title fight against Sumya Anani, who had defeated former champion Christy Martin. Gibbs and Anani fought an exciting ten-round majority draw, which left the 140-lb WIBA World Title vacant. The Gibbs-Anani rematch occurred April 28, 2003, and Gibbs was unable to answer the bell for the second round with an injury to her right hand, yielding the victory to Anani. Disappointed in the outcome, Gibbs explained "I came in ready to win this fight, but Sumya is a strong fighter and I was not prepared to fight her with only my left hand." Following the fight, Gibbs announced her retirement from boxing.

== Acting and modelling ==
Gibbs has also worked as an actress and a sports model for Sebastian International Sports Department. She has been featured in Black Achievers, Black Belt, Delco Times, Inside Karate, Jet, Los Angeles Sentinel, The Philadelphia Inquirer, Sports Illustrated for Women, and Upscale Magazine. In 2000, Gibbs played the villain Tanya "Terminator" Tessario in the film Knockout. In 1996, she had a cameo in an episode of The Fresh Prince of Bel-Air.

== Today ==
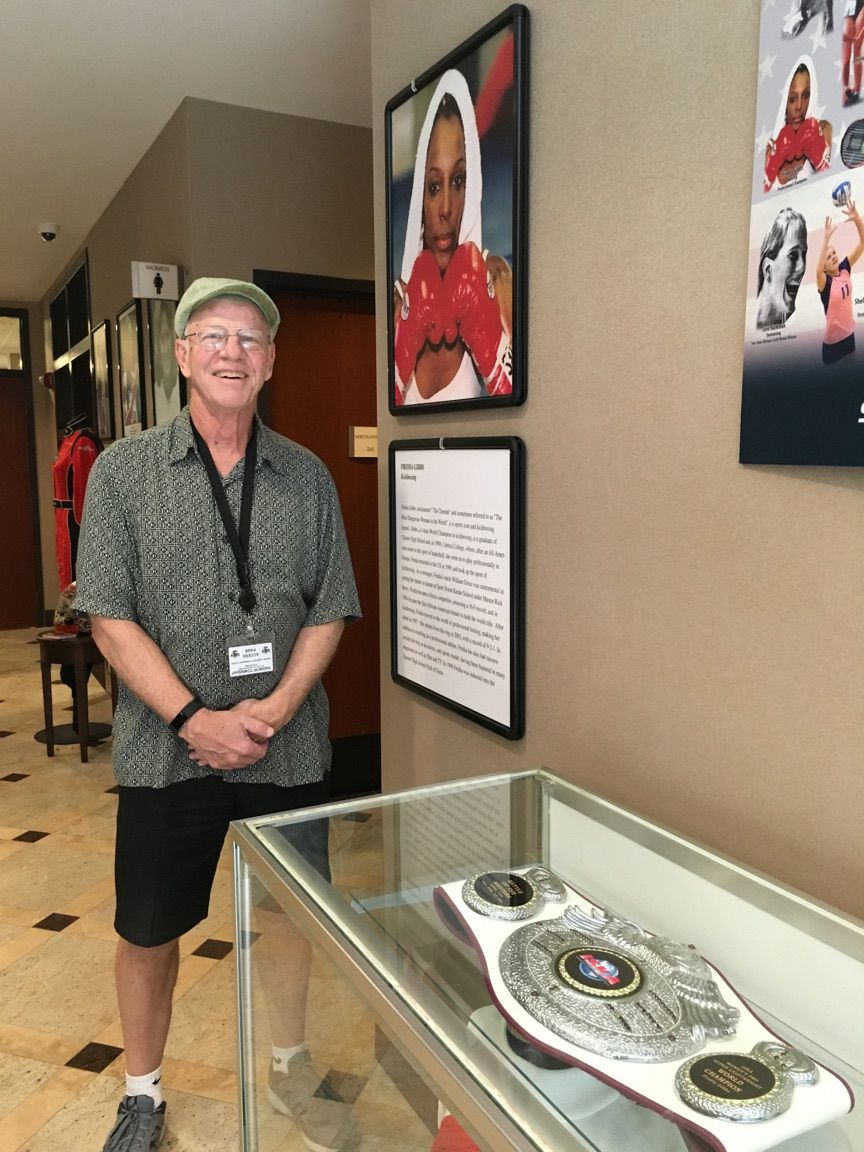
Fredia Gibbs first World Championship belt and other memorabilia on display at the Sports Legends Museum of Delaware County, PA, with the museum director

Beyond fighting, she is also a motivational speaker, a published author and an advocate for women in sports & self defense.

Her kickboxing fight gear is displayed at the Sports Legend of Delaware County Museum, in Radnor, Pennsylvania.

February 5, 2022 she was honored and participated in the Orange County Heritage Black History Parade "The Female Athletic Division Marshal" and was nominated to attend the United State of Women summit hosted by the White House.

In 2016 Gibbs was named one of the Top Ten Greatest African American Female Athletes of All time for Kickboxing.

A six foot bronze statue of Fredia Gibbs was erected in September 2022, honoring her achievements and symbolizing her strength, resilience, and legacy as an inspiration for future generations.

She has spoken openly about being attacked by serial killer Lonnie David Franklin Jr. in the Fall of 1993 at a domino game in Inglewood, California. He drugged her drinks, offered her a ride home in his van, trapped her and attempted to rape her. She was able to fight him off. She is one of the only two known survivors.

== Championships and accomplishments ==
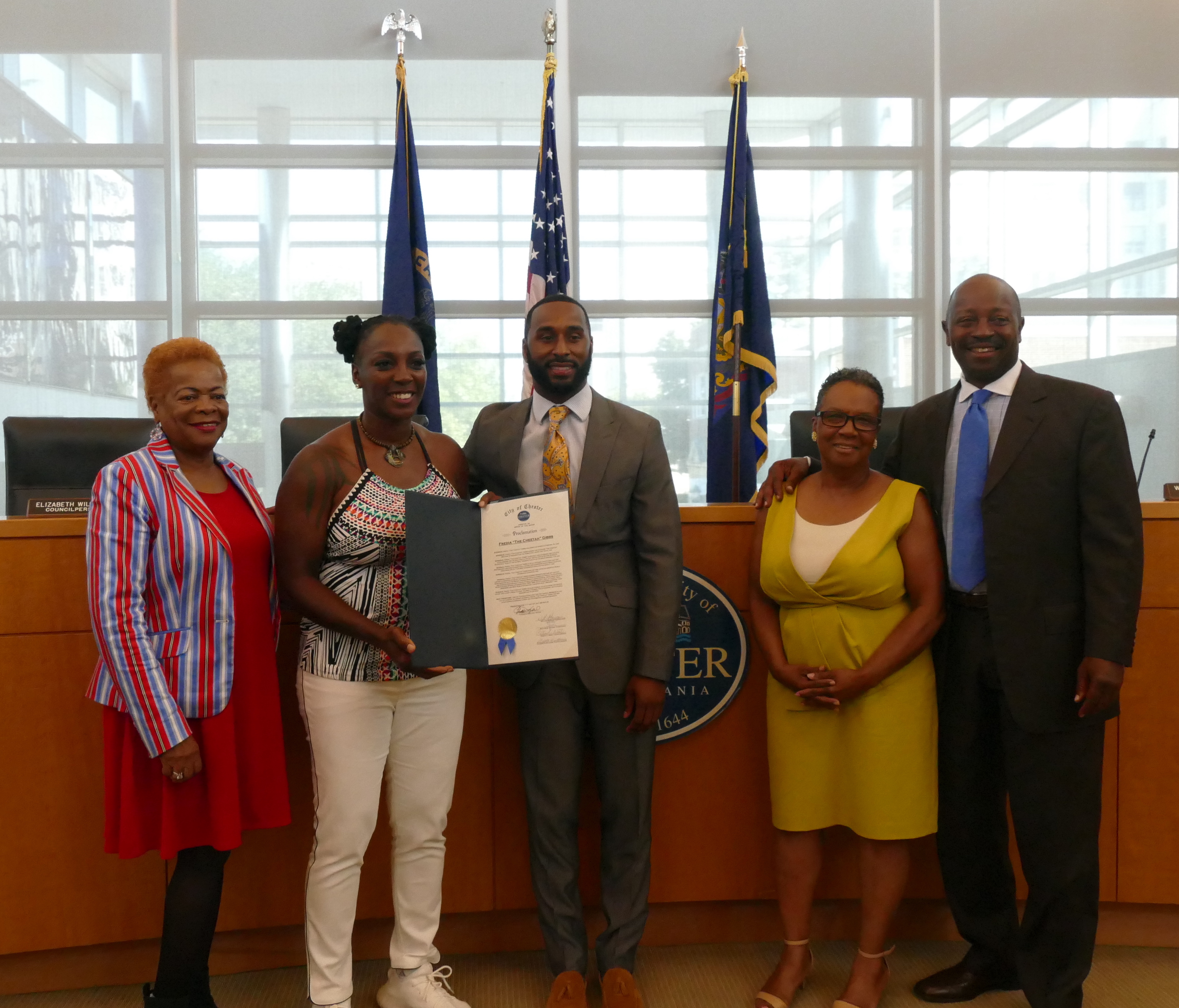
Fredia Gibbs with members of Chester, PA City Council as she receives Proclamation recognizing her lifetime achievements, July 11, 2018

- 1986–1988 3-time World Tae Kwon Do Champion
- 1994–2001 ISKA World Kickboxing Champion (2 defenses)
- 1995–1999 WKA World Kickboxing Champion (2 defenses)
- 1996–2000 WCK World Kickboxing Champion (2 defenses)
- 2015–2016 Featured in Orange County Black History Heritage Parade
- 2015 Hall of Fame Inductee for Basketball at Chester High School
- 2016 AOCA Awakening Outstanding Contribution Award
- 2016 Hall of Fame Inductee for Track & Field at Chester High School
- 2016 Inducted into Mickey Vernon Sports Legend Museum–Delaware County Black History
- 2016 Selected as the Greatest African American Female Athlete of All Time for Kickboxing
- 2017 Her ISKA World Championship Belt was Inducted into the Sports Legends Of Delaware County Museum in Radnor, Pa September 17, 2017
- 2018 Honored as one of the greatest female athletes in Philadelphia history, held at Temple University in Philadelphia, Pa on August 18, 2018
- 2018 Given the Key to the City of her hometown, Chester, Pennsylvania by the Mayor and City of Council, on July 11, 2018
- 2022 Philadelphia Sports Hall of Fame Inductee

== Kickboxing record ==
Kickboxing and Muay Thai record (incomplete)
Kickboxing record 16 wins (15 KOs), 0 losses, 1 draws Muay Thai record 8 wins (? KOs), 0 losses, 0 draws
Date	Result	Opponent	Event	Location	Method	Round	Time	Record
1996-02-03	Win	(United States) Tammy Jo Leazier	Muay Thai event	Los Angeles, California, US	TKO			
1995-08-11	Win	(United States) Arlene Sanchez		Reno, Nevada, US	TKO (retirement)	5		
Retains the ISKA World Super Lightweight (−62.3 kg/137 lb) Full Contact Championship.
1995-?-?	Win	(United States) Allison Jaeger		Los Angeles, California, US	TKO (low kicks)	4		
Retains the ISKA World Super Lightweight (−62.3 kg/137 lb) Full Contact Championship.
1994-08-27	Win	(United States) Yvonne Trevino	Muay Thai event	Los Angeles, California, US	TKO			
1994-04-15	Win	(France) Valérie Hénin		San Jose, California, US	TKO (overhand right)	3		
Wins the ISKA World Super Lightweight (−62.3 kg/137 lb) Full Contact Championship.
1993-10-03	Win	(United States) Yvonne Trevino	Muay Thai event	Simi Valley, California, US	Win	5		
1993-07-30	Win	(United States) Francine Morris	Muay Thai event	Long Beach, California, US	Decision (unanimous)	5		
Wins Muay Thai title.
1993-03-06	Win	(United States) Lonnie Shelby		Tarzana, California, US	KO			
1993-02-06	Win	(United States) Chevrette Pabros		Bakersfield, California, US	KO			
1992-12-12	Win	(United States) Christine Dupree	Muay Thai event	Los Angeles, California, US				
1992-07-06	Win	(United States) Chevrette Pabros		Bakersfield, California, US	KO			
Wins the WKA Lightweight World Championship.
1992-06-14	Win	(United States) Tracey Brown		Tarzana, California, US	KO			
1992-04-12	Win	(United States) Kelley Johns		San Bernardino, California, US	KO			
1991-10-24	Win	(Mexico) Lois Canelo			TKO			
Legend: Win Loss Draw/No contest Notes

== Professional boxing record ==
12 fights	9 wins	2 losses
By knockout	9	0
By decision	0	2
Draws	1	

No.	Result	Record	Opponent	Type	Round, time	Date	Location	Notes
12	Loss		(United States) Sumya Anani	RTD		Apr 18, 2003	(United States) Palace Indian Gaming Center, Lemoore, California, USA	
11	Win		(United States) Kanicia Eley	UD		Apr 18, 2003	(United States) Louisville Gardens, Louisville, Kentucky, USA	
10	Draw		(United States) Sumya Anani			Feb 14, 2003	(United States) Convention Center, Austin, Texas, USA	Women's International Boxing Association World super lightweight title
9	Win		(United States) Suzanne Howard	UD		Jun 8, 2001	(United States) Hollywood Park Casino, Inglewood, California, USA	
8	Win		(United States) Michelle Vidales	UD		Nov 5, 1999	(United States) Pechanga Resort & Casino, Temecula, California, USA	
7	Win		(United States) Hannah Fox	UD		Jan 15, 1999	(United States) Orleans Hotel & Casino, Las Vegas, Nevada, USA	
6	Win		(Canada) Olivia Gerula			Sep 19, 1998	(United States) Grand Casino, Biloxi, Mississippi, USA	
5	Loss		(United States) Leah Mellinger	UD		Mar 21, 1998	(United States) Atlantic City, New Jersey, USA	
4	Win		(United States) Anneliese Kolan	TKO		Oct 24, 1997	(United States) Lady Luck Casino, Lula, Mississippi, USA	
3	Win		(United States) Gail Grandchamp	TKO		Aug 2, 1997	(United States) Grand Casino, Biloxi, Mississippi, USA	
2	Win		(United States) Daniele Doobenen	UD		Apr 16, 1997	(United States) Memorial Auditorium, Sacramento, California, USA	
1	Win		(United States) Maria Recinos	UD		Jan 23, 1997	(United States) Country Club, Reseda, California, USA	

== See also ==
- List of female mixed martial artists
