= Para Draine =

American boxer (born 1972)

Personal information
- Nickname: Hurricane
- Nationality: American
- Born: Para Draine; December 28, 1972 (age 53) Seattle, Washington, United States
- Weight: Super bantamweight

Boxing career
- Stance: Orthodox

Boxing record
- Total fights: 20
- Wins: 13
- Win by KO: 2
- Losses: 6
- Draws: 1
- No contests: 0

Para Draine (born December 28, 1972) is an American female boxer who has been a world champion two times. She is a former 112-pound and current 115-pound champion. Draine stands 5’8” tall, making her relatively tall for a boxer of her weight.

Draine's nicknames are "Hurricane" and "The Spokane Spike". The latter nickname reflects the city she currently resides at. Draine has fought a large part of her fights in the American Northwest, specially in Worley, Idaho, but, because of her achievements, she has become well known in the world of boxing.

Her first professional fight came on May 14, 1997, when she defeated Dolores Lira by a four round decision, at Worley. Her first knockout win was on June 25 of that same year, when she beat Trena Drotar in the fourth round. Draine won her first five fights.

After she beat the experienced Sue Chase in her fifth fight, she and her management team thought she was ready for a world title try, so, on November 12, she challenged Theresa Arnold for the IBA's women's version of the world Bantamweight title. She lost that fight by a ten round split decision.

Draine then decided to go down in weight and try to become a world Flyweight champion. After two wins, including one over the famed British boxer Michelle Sutcliffe, she challenged the WIBF world Flyweight champion, Yvonne Trevino. On August 8, 1998, at Spirit Lake, North Dakota, Draine became a world champion by beating Trevino by a ten round split decision. She is a boxer who often jumps from one division to another, so she returned to the Bantamweight division. Despite losing her next fight, she got a world title try in her first fight at as a Super Bantamweight: On April 18, 1999, she and Silke Weikenmeyer fought for the vacant WIBF Super Bantamweight title. In what was Draine's first overseas fight, she lost a ten round decision in Germany.

Next, she beat two well known opponents, Jo Wyman and Brenda Burnside, before once again returning to the Flyweight division, to make her first title defense: on April 6, 2000, she lost her title to the then 8-0 Margaret Sidoriff, in Toronto, Ontario, Canada.

Draine kept fighting well known female boxers after losing that fight: she beat Robin Pinto, lost to Yvonne Caples, drew (tied) with Marylin Salcedo, and beat Bridgett Riley before receiving another world title shot.

On December 18, 2002, she and Salcedo were rematched, with the vacant IFBA world Super Flyweight title on the line. Draine became world Super Flyweight champion by defeating Salcedo with a split decision.

== Professional boxing record ==
20 fights	13 wins	6 losses
By knockout	2	0
By decision	11	6
Draws	1	

No.	Result	Record	Opponent	Type	Round, time	Date	Location	Notes
20	Loss		Kelsey Jeffries	UD		2003-02-13	Centennial Garden Arena, Bakersfield, United States	
19	Loss		Kelsey Jeffries	UD		2003-02-13	Centennial Garden Arena, Bakersfield	
18	Win		Marilyn Salcido	SD		2002-12-18	Marriott Hotel, Irvine	vacant International Female Boxers Association World Super Flyweight Title
17	Win		Bridgett Riley	UD		2002-11-14	Rose Garden, Portland	
16	Draw		Marilyn Salcido	PTS		2002-08-17	Soboba Casino, San Jacinto	
15	Loss		Yvonne Caples	MD		2002-04-12	Stardust Hotel & Casino, Las Vegas	
14	Win		Robin Pinto	UD		2002-03-30	Emerald Queen Casino, Tacoma	
13	Loss		Margaret Sidoroff	UD		2000-04-06	Air Canada Centre, Toronto	vacant Women's International Boxing Federation World Flyweight Title
12	Win		Brenda Burnside	SD		2000-02-17	Coeur d'Alene Casino, Worley	
11	Win		Jo Wyman	SD		1999-11-04	Coeur d'Alene Casino, Worley	
10	Loss		Silke Weickenmeier	UD		1999-04-18	Discothek Broadway, Mannheim	vacant Women's International Boxing Federation World Super Bantamweight Title
9	Loss		Eva Jones	UD		1998-11-12	Market Center, Kansas City	
8	Win		Yvonne Trevino	UD		1998-08-08	Spirit Lake	International Women's Boxing Federation World Flyweight Title
7	Win		Michelle Sutcliffe	TKO		1998-05-24	Tropicana Hotel & Casino, Atlantic City	
6	Win		Shirley Prescott			1998-02-05	Coeur d'Alene Casino, Worley	International Boxing Association Female Bantamweight Title
5	Win		Sue Chase	UD		1997-09-24	Coeur d'Alene Casino, Worley	
4	Win		Eva Young	UD		1997-08-14	Coeur d'Alene Casino, Worley	
3	Win		Natasha Wilburn	UD		1997-07-10	Clearwater River Casino, Lewiston	
2	Win		Trena Drotar	TKO		1997-06-25	Coeur d'Alene Casino, Worley	
1	Win		Dolores Lira	UD		1997-05-14	Coeur d'Alene Casino, Worley	
