= Gail Grandchamp =

American boxer

Personal information
- Born: March 13, 1955 (age 71) North Adams, Massachusetts, U.S.
- Height: 5 ft 0 in (152 cm)
- Weight: lightweight

Boxing career
- Stance: Orthodox

Boxing record
- Wins: 1
- Losses: 6

Gail Grandchamp (born March 13, 1955) is a retired American female boxer. On 16 April 1992, after eight years in court litigation in Massachusetts, she gained the right to become a boxer, as a state Superior Court judge deemed it was illegal to deny someone a chance to box based on gender. During her efforts to gain the right to box as an amateur, she passed the age of 36, the maximum age for amateur fighters. She instead pursued a career as professional boxer.

== Professional boxing record ==
7 fights	1 win	6 losses
By knockout	0	6
By decision	1	0

No.	Result	Record	Opponent	Type	Round, time	Date	Location	Notes
7	Loss	1-6	Belinda Laracuente	TKO		1998-09-12	Miccosukee Indian Gaming Resort, Miami, Florida, US	
6	Loss	1-5	Fredia Gibbs	TKO		1997-08-02	Grand Casino, Biloxi, Mississippi, US	
5	Loss	1-4	Helen Zagadinow	TKO		1997-06-05	Country Club, Plymouth, Pennsylvania, US	
4	Loss	1-3	Nora Daigle	TKO		1995-12-05	Forum, Montreal	
3	Loss	1-2	Deirdre Gogarty	TKO		1994-10-06	Tampa, Florida, US	
2	Loss	1-1	Beverly Szymanski	TKO		1994-06-10	Erie, Pennsylvania, US	
1	Win	1-0	Linda Casey	SD		1987-07-17	Mohawk Performing Arts Center, North Adams, Massachusetts, US	
