= Sonya Emery =

American boxer

Sonya Anne Emery (born July 7, 1972 in Austin, Texas, U.S.), better known plainly as Sonya Emery, is a former female boxer who boxed professionally from 1997 to 1998.

Emery had a significant amateur women's boxing career, winning various state and national championships, sparking interest when she announced she was to become a professional.

She debuted as a professional boxer on August 19 of '97, with a second- round knockout win over Colleen Smith at her hometown of Austin.

Her second bout was on January 6 of '98, when she met Cinthya Prouder. Emery suffered her first career defeat when outpointed by Prouder over four rounds.

On February 11, she met the very experienced Gloria Ramirez at Fort Worth, Texas, losing by a four-round split decision.

In March of that year, Emery traveled halfway across the Pacific, to meet Colleen Smith in a rematch, at Honolulu, Hawaii. She defeated Smith for a second time, this time by knockout in round three.

Next for Emery was Angelica Villain, on May 1, back in Emery's home state. With a knockout 24 seconds into the first round, Emery scored one of the quickest wins in male or female boxing history.

Only seven days later, she made her Las Vegas debut, when she knocked out the highly touted Valerie Troike in three rounds. That was Troike's first career defeat, after six fights without a loss.

After the win against Troike, however, Emery's career started to go down, as she lost two of her final three bouts as a professional. On July 31, she met future world champion "Downtown Leona Brown" in Atlantic City, New Jersey, losing by a six-round split decision.

On August 15, she beat the well-known Jayla Ortiz by a six-round unanimous decision, in what would turn out to be her career's final win. That fight was also held in Las Vegas.

Emery went to Worley, Idaho, a city where women's boxing is a main attraction, to meet Theresa Arnold on November 23, and she lost a close, eight-round split decision (scores of 75–78, 75-77 and 77–76). This would be the last fight both for Emery and for Arnold, as the two rivals announced their retirement soon after the fight.

Sonya Emery compiled a lifetime record of five wins and four losses, with four wins by knockout. She was never KOed herself.
