= Yvonne Caples =

American boxer (born 1972)

Personal information
- Nationality: United States
- Born: Yvonne Tara Caples; 14 June 1972 (age 54) Pune, Maharashtra, India
- Height: 5 ft 4 in (163 cm)
- Weight: Mini flyweight; Light flyweight
- Website: yvonnecaples.org

Boxing career
- Reach: 64 in (163 cm)
- Stance: Southpaw

Boxing record
- Total fights: 22
- Wins: 7
- Win by KO: 1
- Losses: 12
- Draws: 2
- No contests: 1

Yvonne Caples (born 14 June 1972) is an American former professional boxer who competed between 1999 and 2014. She held the IFBA light flyweight title in 2003 and challenged for multiple world championships during her career; the WIBF light flyweight title in 2002; the WIBA minimumweight title twice in 2004 and 2005; and the WBC female light flyweight title in 2005. Caples is a member of the International Women's Boxing Hall of Fame.

== Boxing career ==
Caples became a professional boxer in 1999. Before fighting for the world championship, she had to meet the likes of Kim Messer, Elena Reid and former world champion Para Draine before meeting Regina Halmich in Germany for the WIBF world Jr. Flyweight title, on 17 August 2002. She lost the fight by a majority decision.

Three months later, on November 22, she found herself inside a boxing ring in Guam, where she fought Anissa Zamarron for the vacant WIBA Light Flyweight Intercontinental championship, and Caples was defeated by 5th round technical knockout, stopped on a cut in a fight in Caples was winning on all scorecards.

Caples finally reached her dream of becoming a world champion when she defeated Mary Duron on 26 July 2003 in Costa Mesa, California by a ten-round unanimous decision for the vacant IFBA world Jr. Flyweight title.

Caples then travelled to Trinidad to challenge Ria Ramnarine for the vacant WIBA Mini Flyweight World Title. Caples lost a controversial 10-round split decision.

She was inducted into the International Women's Boxing Hall of Fame in 2025.

== Professional boxing record ==
22 fights	7 wins	12 losses
By knockout	1	1
By decision	6	11
Draws	2	
No contests	1	

No.	Result	Record	Opponent	Type	Round, time	Date	Location	Notes
22	Loss	7–12–2 (1)	(United States) Ebony Rivera	UD	4	Sep 12, 2014	(United States) Durham Armory, Durham, North Carolina, U.S.	
21	Loss	7–11–2 (1)	(United Kingdom) Suzannah Warner	UD	8	Dec 8, 2006	(United States) Paradise Theater, New York City, New York, U.S.	For vacant NABF female atomweight title
20	Loss	7–10–2 (1)	(United States) Wendy Rodriguez	UD	8	Oct 8, 2005	(United States) Harrah's Laughlin, Laughlin, Nevada, U.S.	
19	NC	7–9–2 (1)	(United States) Stephanie Dobbs	NC	4 (4)	Aug 26, 2005	(United States) Thunderbird Wild West Casino, Norman, Oklahoma, U.S.	
18	Loss	7–9–2	(North Korea) Eun Soon Choi	UD	10	Jun 28, 2005	Pyongyang, North Korea	For inaugural WBC female light flyweight title
17	Loss	7–8–2	(Trinidad and Tobago) Ria Ramnarine	SD	10	May 28, 2005	Jean Pierre Sports Complex, Port of Spain, Trinidad and Tobago	For vacant WIBA mini flyweight title
16	Loss	7–7–2	(United States) Carina Moreno	UD	8	Nov 27, 2004	(United States) Hyatt Regency Hotel, Monterey, California, U.S.	
15	Draw	7–6–2	(Japan) Yuko Sodeoka	PTS	10	Sep 18, 2004	Kyoto, Japan	For WIBA mini flyweight title
14	Win	7–6–1	(United States) Mary Duron	UD	10	Jul 26, 2003	(United States) Hilton Hotel, Costa Mesa, California, U.S.	Won vacant IFBA light flyweight title
13	Loss	6–6–1	(South Korea) In Young Lee	UD	8	Mar 29, 2003	Jamsil Arena, Seoul, South Korea	
12	Loss	6–5–1	(United States) Anissa Zamarron	TKO	5 (8)	Nov 22, 2002	Guam University Fieldhouse, Agana, Guam	For WIBA Inter-Continental light flyweight title
11	Loss	6–4–1	(Germany) Regina Halmich	MD	10	Aug 17, 2002	Estrel Convention Center, Berlin, Germany	For WIBF light flyweight title
10	Win	6–3–1	(United States) Marilyn Salcido	UD	6	Jul 3, 2002	(United States) Hyatt Regency Hotel, Monterey, California, U.S.	
9	Win	5–3–1	(United States) Para Draine	MD	6	Apr 12, 2002	(United States) Stardust Resort and Casino, Winchester, Nevada, U.S.	
8	Win	4–3–1	(Canada) Robin Pinto	UD	4	Apr 7, 2001	(United States) Lucky Eagle Casino, Rochester, Washington, U.S.	
7	Draw	3–3–1	(United States) Elena Reid	PTS	4	Jan 28, 2001	(United States) Greyhound Park, Phoenix, Arizona, U.S.	
6	Win	3–3	(United States) Nadine Salim	UD	4	Oct 13, 2000	(United States) Spa Resort and Casino, Palm Springs, California, U.S.	
5	Loss	2–3	(United States) Elena Reid	UD	4	Oct 1, 2000	(United States) Celebrity Theatre, Phoenix, Arizona, U.S.	
4	Loss	2–2	(United States) Lori Lord	UD	10	Aug 4, 2000	(United States) Ben Hur Shrine Temple, Austin, Texas, U.S.	
3	Loss	2–1	(South Korea) Kim Messer	UD	6	Feb 11, 2000	(United States) Kenner, Louisiana, U.S.	
2	Win	2–0	(United States) Wendy Rodriguez	UD	4	Nov 14, 1999	(United States) Sacramento Convention Center Complex, Sacramento, California, U.S.	
1	Win	1–0	(United States) Natasha Wilburn	TKO	3 (4), 0:11	Sep 2, 1999	(United States) Gold Strike Casino, Tunica, Mississippi, U.S.	

== Educational career ==
Caples attended the University of California, Berkeley where she received a Bachelor of Arts in English. She also has a M. Ed in Curriculum and Instruction with an emphasis in Technology Integration and an M.S. in Sports Coaching. She has made a career in education as a high school teacher and Technology Integration Specialist.
