= Regina Halmich =

German boxer

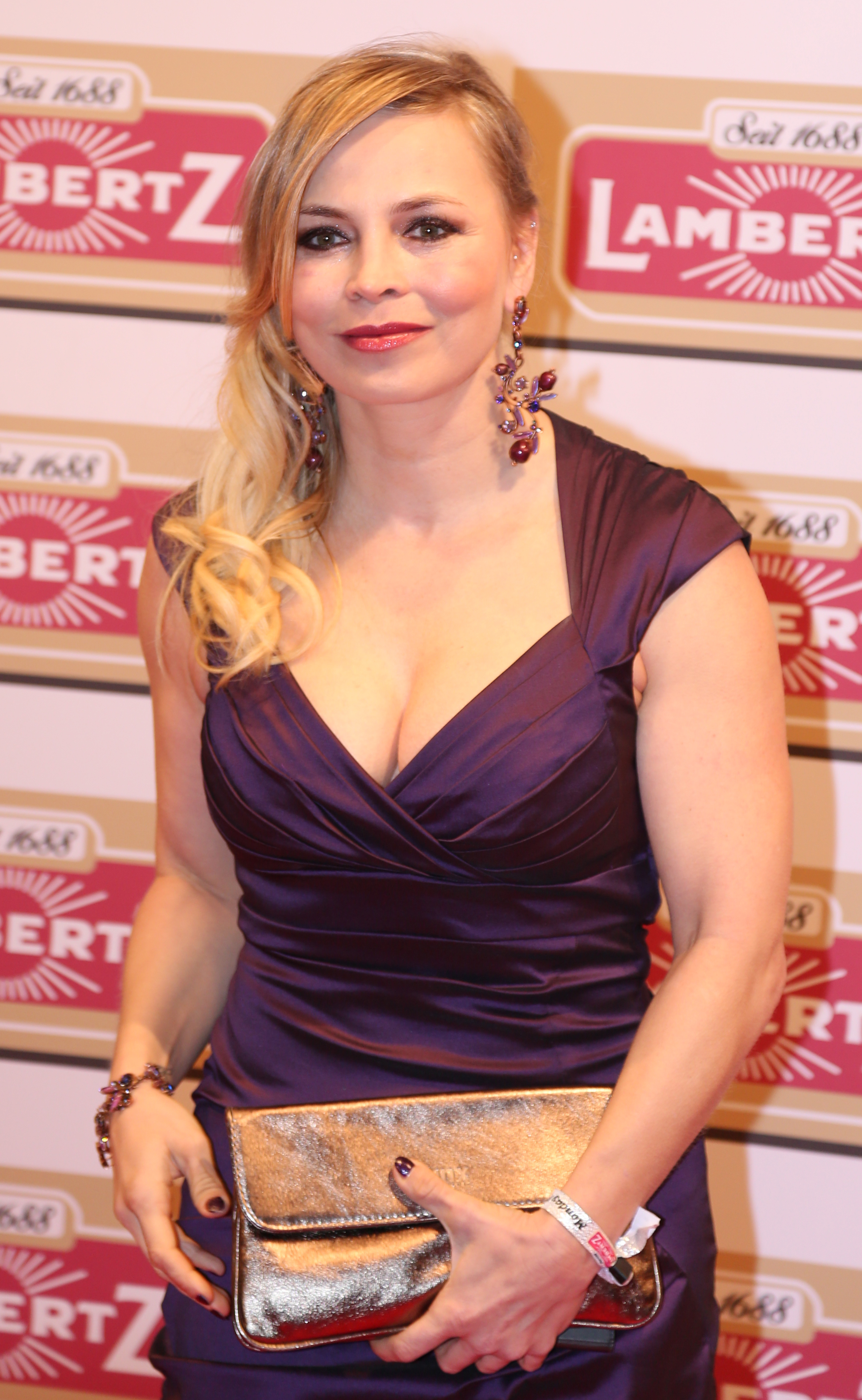
- Halmich in 2017

Personal information
- Nationality: German
- Born: Regina Halmich; 22 November 1976 (age 49) Karlsruhe, West Germany
- Height: 5 ft 3 in (160 cm)
- Weight: Light Flyweight; Flyweight; Super Flyweight

Boxing career
- Stance: Orthodox

Boxing record
- Total fights: 56
- Wins: 54
- Win by KO: 16
- Losses: 1
- Draws: 1
- No contests: 0

Regina Halmich (born 22 November 1976) is a German former professional boxer. She is among the most successful female boxers of all time and helped popularise female boxing in Europe.

== Amateur career ==
Halmich was German champion in kickboxing as an amateur in 1992, 1993, and 1994, a year in which she also earned the European title.

== Professional career ==
As a professional, she has boxed in the Jr. Flyweight, Flyweight, Jr. Bantamweight, Bantamweight and Featherweight divisions. Halmich was the WIBF's world champion in the Jr. Flyweight, Flyweight and Super Flyweight divisions. Halmich made her professional debut on 4 March 1994, in her hometown of Karlsruhe, defeating Fienie Klee of the Netherlands.

Regina Halmich has defeated several quality boxers during her career. She defended her Flyweight title with success against Delia Gonzalez, Yvonne Caples, Johanna Peña-Álvarez and numerous others, once only with a draw against Elena Reid. She also faced Daisy Lang, against whom she won in a fight for the vacant IWBF world Super Flyweight title.

On 15 January 2005, she defeated Marylin Hernandez by a ten-round unanimous decision defending the world Flyweight title. On 16 April 2005 she also defeated Hollie Dunaway in ten rounds defending her title. In her 50th professional fight, she defended the title against María Jesús Rosa Reina from Spain. She held the title for more than ten years. In December 2005 she won the rematch against Elena Reid.

On 9 September 2006, Halmich won her 53rd pro fight, defeating Ria Ramnarine of Trinidad and Tobago by TKO in the sixth round. Her pro boxing record now stands at 52 wins, 1 loss and 1 draw.

Halmich faced Reka Krempf of Hungary on 13 January 2007 at the Brandberg Arena in Halle (Saale), defeating her by a unanimous decision for the 44th successful title defense.

=== Retirement ===
Halmich announced her retirement after her farewell fight on 30 November 2007, in which she beat Hagar Finer of Israel by majority decision (96–94, 97–94, 95–95).

== Outside the ring ==
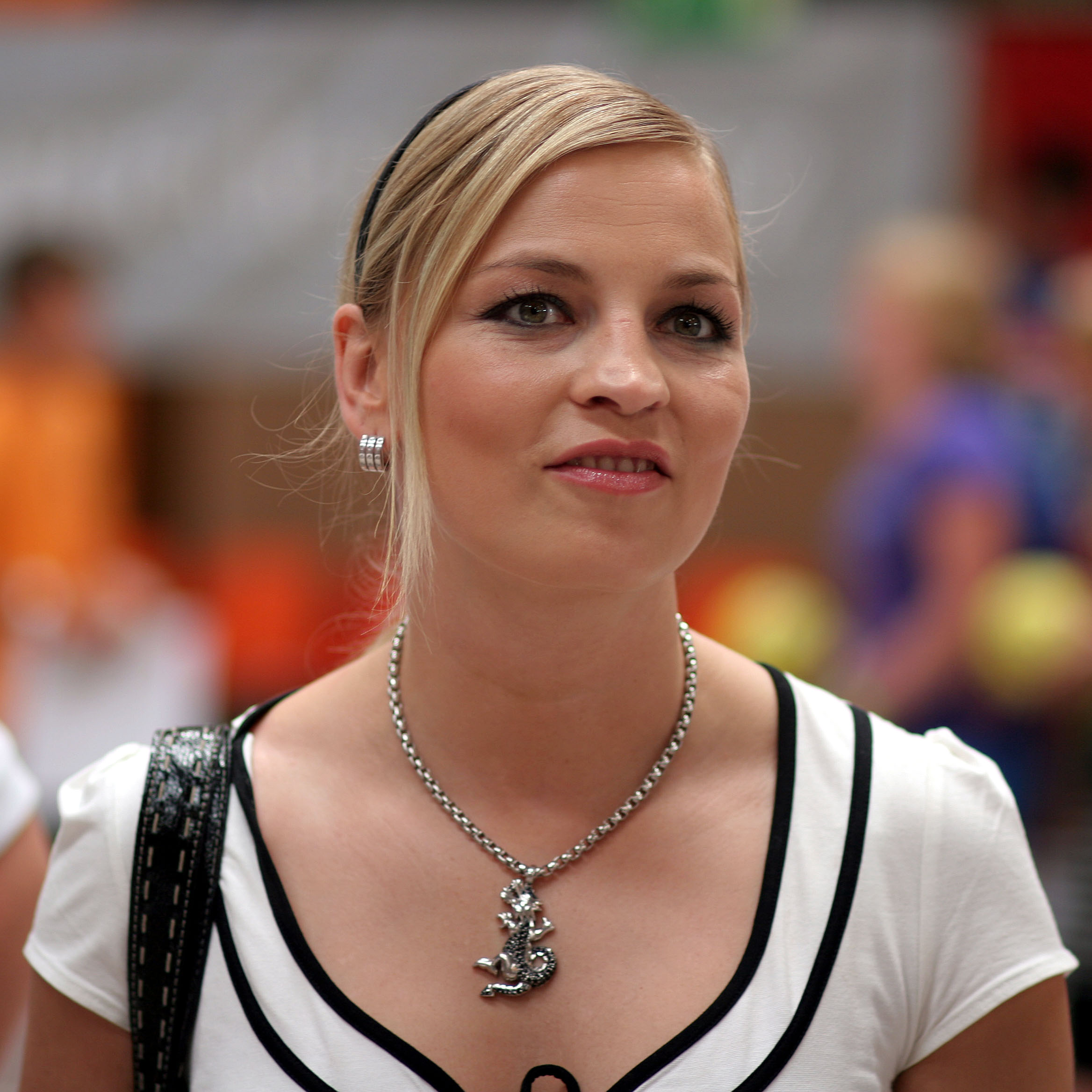
Halmich in 2008

In addition to her boxing career, Halmich has branched out into the world of business, as she became one of the first women boxers to have her own line of cosmetics. She has posed as a model for some German magazines and websites. Halmich became famous on German television with a promotional fight against German TV host Stefan Raab, in his show TV total in March 2001. The fight was rather chaotic, the referee intended to end it more than once because he felt that Stefan Raab's health was in danger, but show host Raab kept convincing him to continue the fight. Although Halmich broke Stefan Raab's nose during the fight, he at least managed to go the distance with her. A second fight between these two took place in 2007, and Halmich won again.

The EP All We Are – The Fight by metal band Warlock is subtitled "A Tribute to Regina Halmich", because this version of the title track "All We Are" was originally performed on 30 March 2006 on German TV as the entrance song for Regina Halmich, who was also Doro Pesch's best friend.

== International recognition ==
She is not a stranger to American boxing fans, and, in 1996, American boxing publication Ring Magazine published the first of a number of articles about her in that magazine. In January 2016, it considered her the 2nd best female boxer of all time.

== Professional boxing record ==
56 fights	54 wins	1 loss
By knockout	16	1
By decision	38	0
Draws	1	

No.	Result	Record	Opponent	Type	Round, time	Date	Location	Notes
56	Win	54–1–1	Hagar Finer	MD	10	30 Nov 2007	DM-Arena, Karlsruhe, Germany	Retained WIBF female flyweight title
55	Win	53–1–1	Wendy Rodriguez	UD	10	28 Jul 2007	Burg-Wächter Castello, Düsseldorf, Germany	Retained WIBF female flyweight title
54	Win	52–1–1	Reka Krempf	UD	10	13 Jan 2007	Brandberge Arena, Halle (Saale), Germany	Retained WIBF female flyweight title
53	Win	51–1–1	Ria Ramnarine	TKO	6 (10), 0:54	9 Sep 2006	Bordelandhalle, Magdeburg, Germany	Retained WIBF female flyweight title
52	Win	50–1–1	Viktoria Milo	UD	10	6 May 2006	Burg-Wächter Castello, Düsseldorf, Germany	Retained WIBF female flyweight title
51	Win	49–1–1	Elena Reid	UD	10	3 Dec 2005	Bordelandhalle, Magdeburg, Germany	Retained WIBF female flyweight title
50	Win	48–1–1	María Jesús Rosa Reina	SD	10	10 Sep 2005	DM-Arena, Karlsruhe, Germany	Retained WIBF female flyweight title
49	Win	47–1–1	Hollie Dunaway	UD	10	16 Apr 2005	Bordelandhalle, Magdeburg, Germany	Retained WIBF female flyweight title
48	Win	46–1–1	Marilyn Hernandez	UD	10	15 Jan 2005	Bordelandhalle, Magdeburg, Germany	Retained WIBF female flyweight title
47	Draw	45–1–1	Elena Reid	SD	10	11 Sep 2004	Ostseehalle, Kiel, Germany	Retained WIBF female flyweight title
46	Win	45–1	Daisy Lang	UD	10	29 May 2004	Ostseehalle, Kiel, Germany	Won vacant IWBF female super flyweight title
45	Win	44–1	Johanna Peña Álvarez	UD	10	17 Jan 2004	DM-Arena, Karlsruhe, Germany	Retained WIBF female flyweight title
44	Win	43–1	Svetla Taskova	TKO	6 (10)	12 Jul 2003	Wilhelm-Dopatka-Halle, Leverkusen, Germany	Retained WIBF female flyweight title
43	Win	42–1	Cathy Brown	UD	10	26 Apr 2003	Sport- und Kongresshalle, Schwerin, Germany	Retained WIBF female flyweight title
42	Win	41–1	Nadja Loritz	UD	10	18 Jan 2003	Grugahalle, Essen, Germany	Won vacant WIBF female flyweight title
41	Win	40–1	Yvonne Caples	MD	10	17 Aug 2002	Estrel Convention Center, Berlin, Germany	Retained WIBF female light flyweight title
40	Win	39–1	Anca Moise	TKO	4 (10)	20 Apr 2002	Stoczniowiec Olivia Arena, Gdańsk, Poland	Retained WIBF female light flyweight title
39	Win	38–1	Svetla Taskova	UD	10	24 Nov 2001	Universum Gym, Hamburg, Germany	Retained WIBF female light flyweight title
38	Win	37–1	Alina Shaternikova	UD	10	21 Jul 2001	Tivoli Eissporthalle, Aachen, Germany	Retained WIBF female light flyweight title
37	Win	36–1	Andrea Blevins	KO	5 (10), 1:35	7 Apr 2001	Universum Gym, Hamburg, Germany	Retained WIBF female light flyweight title
36	Win	35–1	Szilvia Csicsely	TKO	3 (10)	24 Feb 2001	Sporthalle, Hamburg, Germany	Retained WIBF female light flyweight title
35	Win	34–1	Alina Shaternikova	SD	10	16 Dec 2000	Grugahalle, Essen, Germany	Retained WIBF female light flyweight title
34	Win	33–1	Michelle Sutcliffe	UD	12	7 Oct 2000	Estrel Convention Center, Berlin, Germany	Retained WIBF female light flyweight title
33	Win	32–1	Delia Gonzalez	MD	10	13 May 2002	Sartory Säle, Cologne, Germany	Retained WIBF female super flyweight title
32	Win	31–1	Viktoria Varga	TKO	5 (10), 1:15	19 Feb 2000	Estrel Convention Center, Berlin, Germany	Retained WIBF female light flyweight title
31	Win	30–1	Jill Matthews	UD	10	18 Sep 1999	Maritim Hotel, Stuttgart, Germany	Retained WIBF female light flyweight title
30	Win	29–1	Erzsebet Borosi	TKO	8 (10)	10 Jul 1999	Sporthalle, Augsburg, Germany	Won vacant WIBF female light flyweight title
29	Win	28–1	Lourdes Noemi Gonzalez	KO	1 (10)	27 Mar 1999	Sartory Säle, Cologne, Germany	Retained WIBF female flyweight title
28	Win	27–1	Viktoria Pataki	UD	10	5 Dec 1998	Sport Palace, Kyiv, Ukraine	Retained WIBF female flyweight title
27	Win	26–1	Anissa Zamarron	UD	10	3 Oct 1998	Prinz-Garden Halle, Augsburg, Germany	Retained WIBF female flyweight title
26	Win	25–1	Stefania Bianchini	UD	10	10 Jul 1998	Circus Krone, Munich, Germany	Retained WIBF female super flyweight title
25	Win	24–1	Maria Rosa Tabbuso	TKO	6 (10)	18 Apr 1998	Eurogress, Aachen, Germany	Won WIBF female super flyweight title
24	Win	23–1	Lisa Houghton	UD	10	7 Mar 1998	Sartory Säle, Cologne, Germany	Retained WIBF female flyweight title
23	Win	22–1	Francesca Lupo	UD	10	29 Nov 1997	Rheinstrandhalle, Karlsruhe, Germany	Retained WIBF female flyweight title
22	Win	21–1	Viktoria Pataki	UD	10	20 Sep 1997	Tivoli Eissporthalle, Aachen, Germany	Retained WIBF female flyweight title
21	Win	20–1	Lisa Houghton	UD	10	27 Jun 1997	Oberrheinhalle, Offenburg, Germany	Retained WIBF female flyweight title
20	Win	19–1	Nojima Miyuki	UD	10	8 Mar 1997	Sartory Säle, Cologne, Germany	Retained WIBF female flyweight title
19	Win	18–1	Cheryll Robertson	UD	10	21 Dec 1996	Zoo-Gesellschaftshaus, Frankfurt, Germany	Retained WIBF female flyweight title
18	Win	17–1	Michelle Sutcliffe	TKO	2 (10)	2 Nov 1996	Olympia Eisstadion, Garmisch-Partenkirchen, Germany	Retained WIBF female flyweight title
17	Win	16–1	Diane Berry	UD	10	17 Aug 1996	Zoo-Gesellschaftshaus, Frankfurt, Germany	Retained WIBF female flyweight title
16	Win	15–1	Melinda Papp	TKO	4 (10)	13 Apr 1996	Sporthalle, Hamburg, Germany	Retained WIBF female flyweight title
15	Win	14–1	Dagmar Richardson	KO	8 (10), 1:24	10 Feb 1996	Stadthalle, Cottbus, Germany	Retained WIBF female flyweight title
14	Win	13–1	Anissa Zamarron	UD	10	2 Dec 1995	Carl Benz Halle, Karlsruhe, Germany	Retained WIBF female flyweight title
13	Win	12–1	Petrina Phillips	UD	10	4 Nov 1995	Sartory-Säle, Cologne, Germany	
12	Win	11–1	Brigitte Scherzinour	KO	8 (10)	23 Sep 1995	Saaltheater Geulen, Aachen, Germany	Retained WIBF female flyweight title
11	Win	10–1	Sonia Pereira	TKO	7 (10)	5 Aug 1995	Sport und Erholungszentrum, Berlin, Germany	
10	Win	9–1	Kim Messer	SD	10	10 Jun 1995	Europahalle, Karlsruhe, Germany	Won vacant WIBF female flyweight title
9	Loss	8–1	Yvonne Trevino	RTD	4 (10), 2:00	20 Apr 1995	Aladdin Hotel & Casino, Las Vegas, Nevada, US	For vacant WIBF female flyweight title
8	Win	8–0	Maria Rosa Tabbuso	PTS	10 (10)	2 Apr 1995	Italy	
7	Win	7–0	Paula Moreira	PTS	6 (6)	11 Mar 1995	Lugner City, Vienna, Austria	
6	Win	6–0	Cheryll Robertson	PTS	10 (10)	25 Nov 1994	Karlsruhe, Baden-Württemberg, Germany	
5	Win	5–0	Severine Grandsire	PTS	6 (6)	2 Sep 1994	Karlsruhe, Baden-Württemberg, Germany	
4	Win	4–0	Sonja Silva	KO	1 (?)	17 Jun 1994	Karlsruhe, Baden-Württemberg, Germany	
3	Win	3–0	Severine Grandsire	PTS	6 (6)	5 Jun 1994	Bruchsal, Baden-Württemberg, Germany	
2	Win	2–0	Birgit Veerle	KO	3 (?)	22 Apr 1993	Karlsruhe, Baden-Württemberg, Germany	
1	Win	1–0	Fienie Klee	PTS	6	4 Mar 1994	Karlsruhe, Baden-Württemberg, Germany	Professional debut

Preceded by Delia Gonzalez (Vacated)	WIBF World Super Flyweight Champion; 25 November 1994–1999 (Vacated)	Succeeded by Daisy Lang
Preceded by Yvonne Trevino (Vacated)	WIBF World Flyweight Champion; 10 June 1995 – 7 December 2007(Vacated)	Succeeded by Susi Kentikian
Preceded by Delia Gonzalez (Vacated)	WIBF World Light Flyweight Champion; 10 July 1999–2002/2003 (Vacated)	Succeeded by María Jesús Rosa Reina
