= Bridgett Riley =

American boxer (born 1973)

Personal information
- Nickname: Baby Doll
- Born: Bridgett Riley; May 13, 1973 (age 53) Oakville, Missouri, U.S.
- Weight: Super-bantamweight

Boxing career
- Stance: Orthodox

Boxing record
- Total fights: 18
- Wins: 15
- Win by KO: 7
- Losses: 3
- Draws: 0
- No contests: 0

Bridgett Riley (born May 13, 1973) is a female boxer and motion picture stuntwoman from Oakville, Missouri, where she graduated in 1989. While working as an airline attendant, she decided to learn martial arts. The interest in the sport came from her brother Patrick's strong interest in mixed martial arts. She trained with her brother and a number of other high-profile martial artists early in her career. Notably, she was trained by former three time world kickboxing champion, Jim Boucher (Belleville, Illinois). She was a member of a competition team with other competitors such as: Ronnie "Diamond" Deleon (World Kickboxing Champion), Patrick Riley (mixed martial arts champion), Donny Reinhardt (world champion), Russ Hogue (US Kickboxing Champion).

She held the International Female Boxers Association`s world Bantamweight championship for a short period of time. Her nickname is "Baby Doll" and she was managed by Don King for several years.

A lifelong fan of combat sports, Riley began to pave her way into relative women's boxing stardom during the early 1990s, when she fought as a kick boxer, winning various titles and becoming famous around kick boxing circles. Riley headlined many kick boxing shows in Las Vegas, and her fights were frequently televised on regional sports networks, such as ASPN.

When Riley announced that she was to begin a career in professional boxing, many of her fans received the news with open arms. Riley debuted as a professional boxer on April 8, 1994, when she beat future world champion Yvonne Trevino by a four round decision in Laughlin, Nevada.

Riley then took off two years from boxing, but she kept busy by fighting kick boxing fights. In 1996, the year which many consider the beginning of the "golden era" of women's boxing, Riley made her comeback to boxing.

On June 16, she beat Del Pettis in Long Beach. Riley suffered her first career loss on May 17, 1997, against Theresa Arnold, due to a cut sustained over her left eye in the sixth round.

Riley won her next two fights, and, on February 15, 1998, she and Trevino were rematched for Trevino's IFBA world Bantamweight championship, in Biloxi, Mississippi. Riley became a world champion by defeating Trevino by a ten round unanimous decision.

On June 26 of that year, she made what would be her only defense of the title, knocking out Aicha Lahsen in nine rounds at Las Vegas. Riley was knocked down by Lahsen in the first round and barely beat the count and made it through the end of the round. She recovered in later rounds and finished the fight with the knock out of Lahsen. This fight was chosen as women's boxing fight of the year for 1998.

She then won three more fights in a row, for a total of eight consecutive wins. However, none of these fights were for a world title. Among the women she defeated during that span were Brenda Burnside, by an eight round split decision at the Madison Square Garden in New York, New York, and Del Pettis, knocked out in the first round of their rematch, which also happened to be Riley's first bout of the 2000s.

On December 7, 2001, her winning streak was stopped when her bout with Yolanda Gonzalez, also held in California, was declared a technical draw (tie), because of a headbutt that caused an injury on Riley's head.

Riley then beat Linda Edwards and Karen Richardson, both by first round knockouts, before facing Para Draine, on November 14, 2002, in Portland, Oregon. Draine outpointed Riley over six rounds.

On January 18, 2003, Riley defeated Angie Bordelon by a six round decision in Raleigh, North Carolina. On June 4 of that year, she knocked out Nicole Gallegos in three rounds, in what has been, to date, her last professional boxing fight.

Riley has a record of 15 wins, 3 losses and 1 draw, with 7 wins by knockout.

She was inducted into the International Women's Boxing Hall of Fame in 2019.

== Film career ==
During several of her layoffs, Riley has had several acting roles. She appeared in the mid 1990s television series WMAC Masters (broadcast on Fox). She appeared in the early 1990s martial arts inspired Triple Impact. She appeared as a boxer in Million Dollar Baby.

In addition to her own acting, she has performed as the stunt double for other actresses. She began her stunt work career as the double for the Yellow Ranger in early Mighty Morphin Power Rangers episodes and Mighty Morphin Power Rangers: The Movie. She doubled for Halle Berry in Catwoman, Malin Akerman in Watchmen, Summer Glau in Serenity, was a stunt in Paranormal Activity: The Marked Ones and others.

== Professional boxing record ==
27 fights	25 wins	1 loss
By knockout	8	0
By decision	17	1
Draws	1	

No.	Result	Record	Opponent	Type	Round, time	Date	Location	Notes
18								
17								
16			Para Draine					
15								
14								
13								
12								
11								
10								
9								
8								
7			Yvonne Trevino					
6								
5								
4								
3								
2								
1			Yvonne Trevino					
