= Women's International Boxing Federation =

Boxing governing body

- Abbreviation: WIBF
- Founded at: Miami
- Purpose: Boxing sanctioning organization
- Headquarters: Miami
- Region served: Worldwide
- President: Barbara Buttrick
- Website: www.boxingfederation.org

The Women's International Boxing Federation (WIBF) is one of the more recognized world championship fight sanctioning organizations in women's boxing. Founded in March 1989, it is based in Miami, Florida, and presided over by Barbara Buttrick. The WIBF is not associated with the similarly named International Boxing Federation (IBF), which promotes men's and women's boxing.

== See also ==
- Women's International Boxing Association
