= Jeri Sitzes =

American Boxer

- Born: Jeri Sue Sitzes; March 21, 1979 (age 47); Springfield, Missouri, United States
- Nickname: Fists of Fury
- Height: 5 ft 6 in (1.68 m)
- Weight: 125 lb (57 kg; 8.9 st)
- Division: Bantamweight (boxing); Flyweight (MMA); Bantamweight (Kickboxing)
- Style: Muay Thai, Boxing, Kickboxing
- Fighting out of: Springfield, Missouri, United States
- Team: Lewis Boxing Gym
- Years active: 2006–2011

Professional boxing record
- Total: 26
- Wins: 15
- By knockout: 6
- Losses: 10
- Draws: 1

Kickboxing record
- Total: 22
- Wins: 18
- Losses: 4

Mixed martial arts record
- Total: 4
- Wins: 3
- By knockout: 2
- By decision: 1
- Losses: 1
- By decision: 1

Other information
- Boxing record from BoxRec
- Mixed martial arts record from Sherdog

Jeri Sitzes (born 21 March 1979) is an American boxer, kickboxer and Muay Thai fighter. She is a former WBC Muaythai Super Bantamweight champion and the former NABF Featherweight champion. She started her professional combat career as a boxer with 15 wins, 10 defeats and 1 draw.

== Championships and accomplishments ==
=== Boxing ===
- North American Boxing Federation
  - NABF Featherweight Championship

=== Muay Thai ===
- World Boxing Council
  - WBC Muaythai Super Bantamweight Championship
- Awakening Fighters
  - 2017 Awakening Fighters Fight of the Year Andra Aho at Lion Fight 35

== Professional boxing record ==
26 fights	15 wins	10 losses
By knockout	6	0
By decision	9	10
Draws	1	

No.	Result	Record	Opponent	Type	Round, time	Date	Location	Notes
26	Win	15-10-1	(United States) Anita Rodriguez	UD	6, 2:00	2014-01–23	(United States) Chevrolet Event Center, Oklahoma City, Oklahoma	
25	Loss	14-10-1	(Trinidad and Tobago) Lisa Brown	UD	8, 2:00	2010-10–30	Casino Rama, Rama, Ontario, Canada	
24	Loss	14-9-1	(Puerto Rico) Melissa Hernandez	UD	6, 2:00	2009-05–09	(United States) Hard Rock Hotel & Casino, Las Vegas, Nevada	
23	Loss	14-8-1	(United States) Ela Nunez	UD	6, 2:00	2008-06–12	(United States) Mohegan Sun Casino, Uncasville, Connecticut	
22	Loss	14-7-1	(Trinidad and Tobago) Lisa Brown	UD	10, 2:00	2008-02–07	(United States) Pechanga Resort & Casino, Temecula, California	IFBA world super bantamweight title
21	Win	14-6-1	(Puerto Rico) Ada Velez	UD	6, 2:00	2007-08–10	(United States) Expo Center, Springfield, Missouri	
20	Win	13-6-1	(United States) Lisa Lewis	UD	6, 2:00	2007-04–07	(United States) Shrine Mosque, Springfield, Missouri	
19	Win	12-6-1	(United States) LeAnne Villareal	TKO	3, 1:54	2006-08–25	(United States) Black River Coliseum, Poplar Bluff, Missouri	
18	Win	11-6-1	(Mexico) Lina Ramirez	UD	8, 2:00	2006-05–04	(United States) Hilton Convention Center, Burbank, California	
17	Win	10-6-1	(United States) Crystal Bolles	TKO	1, 1:59	2006-04–05	(United States) Ameristar Casino, Kansas City, Missouri	
16	Win	9-6-1	(United States) Jackie Chavez	UD	10, 2:00	2006-01–27	(United States) Hollywood Palladium, Hollywood, California	NABF female featherweight title
15	Win	8-6-1	(United States) Sosadea Razo	UD	6, 2:00	2005-05–30	(United States) Warner Center Marriott Woodland Hills, California	
14	Win	7-6-1	(United States) Tammie McDonald	TKO	2, 1:09	2005-03–23	(United States) Ameristar Casino, Kansas City, Missouri	
13	Win	6-6-1	(United States) Lisa Pederson	UD	6, 2:00	2005-01–26	(United States) Ameristar Casino, Kansas City, Missouri	
12	Loss	5-6-1	(United States) Kelsey Jeffries	MD	10, 2:00	2004-09–23	(United States) HP Pavilion, San Jose, California	IBA super bantamweight title
11	Loss	5-5-1	(Trinidad and Tobago) Lisa Brown	UD	6, 2:00	2004-05–26	(United States) Ameristar Casino, Kansas City, Missouri	
10	Loss	5-4-1	(United States) Melinda Cooper	UD	6, 2:00	2004-02–27	(United States) Orleans Hotel & Casino, Las Vegas, Nevada	
9	Win	5-3-1	(United States) Mary Ortega	TKO	5, 1:44	2004-01–23	(United States) Expo Center, Kansas City, Missouri	
8	Draw	4-3-1	(United States) Lakeysha Williams	PTS	8, 2:00	2003-07–18	(United States) Dover Downs, Dover, Delaware	
7	Loss	4-3	(Japan) Emiko Raika	MD	8, 2:00	2003-06–25	Tokyo, Japan	
6	Win	4-2	(United States) Nicole Lawson	TKO	2, 1:41	2003-06–04	(United States) Ameristar Casino, Kansas City, Missouri	
5	Win	3-2	(Canada) Danielle Bouchard	SD	4, 2:00	2003-05–24	(Canada) Convention Centre, Saint John, New Brunswick	
4	Loss	2-2	(United States) Mary Ortega	SD	6, 2:00	2003-04–02	(United States) Ameristar Casino, Kansas City, Missouri	
3	Win	2-1	(United States) Angela Nealon	UD	4, 2:00	2003-01–29	(United States) Ameristar Casino, Kansas City, Missouri	
2	Win	1-1	(United States) Vyenne Head	TKO	1, 1:33	2002-09–25	(United States) Ameristar Casino, Kansas City, Missouri	
1	Loss	0-1	(United States) Renee Richardt	UD	4, 2:00	2002-05–09	(United States) Two Hearts Banquet Center, St. Louis, Missouri	

== Muay thai record ==
Kickboxing record
22 wins (9 KOs), 3 losses, 1 draw
Date	Result	Opponent	Event	Location	Method	Round	Time	Record
16 June 2017	Win	(United States) Laura Torre	?	Springfield, Missouri, United States	Decision (Unanimous)	3	3:00	
3 March 2017	Loss	(Estonia) Andra Aho	Lion Fight 35	Mashantucket, Connecticut, United States	TKO (Referee Stoppage)	3	2:35	
For the Lion Fight Super Bantamweight Title.
2 September 2016	Loss	(England) Iman Barlow	Lion Fight 31	Mashantucket, Connecticut, United States	Decision (Unanimous)	5	3:00	
For the vacant Lion Fight Super Bantamweight Title.
21 November 2014	Loss	(Morocco) Chajmaa Bellakhal	Lion Fight 19	Mashantucket, Connecticut, United States	Decision (Split)	3	3:00	
13 October 2012	Loss	(United States) Tiffany van Soest	Lion Fight 7	Las Vegas, Nevada, United States	Decision (Unanimous)	3	3:00	
25 July 2009	Win	(United States) Christine Toledo	WCK Muay Thai	United States	Decision (Unanimous)	3	3:00	
12 August 2006	Win	(United States) Keri Anne Taylor Melendez	Shin Do Kumate XI	Tampa Bay, Florida, United States	Decision (Split)	3	3:00	
Legend: Win Loss Draw/No contest Notes

== Mixed martial arts record ==
Professional record breakdown
4 matches	3 wins	1 loss
By knockout	2	0
By submission	0	0
By decision	1	1

Res.	Record	Opponent	Method	Event	Date	Round	Time	Location	Notes
Win	3–1	Lacey Schuckman	TKO (punches)	Strikeforce Challengers: Kennedy vs. Cummings	September 25, 2009	3	2:18	Tulsa, Oklahoma, United States	
Loss	2–1	Anita Rodriguez	Decision (split)	XFL Bad Intentions	June 12, 2009	3	5:00	Tulsa, Oklahoma	
Win	2–0	Amber Powell	TKO (punch)	Xtreme Fighting League	March 21, 2009	1	1:30	Miami, Oklahoma	
Win	1–0	Anita Rodriguez	Decision (split)	XFL Collision Course	March 6, 2009	5	2:00	Tulsa, Oklahoma	
