= Galina Ivanova =

Bulgarian boxer

Galina Ivanova Галина Иванова
Personal information
- Born: Galina Koleva Ivanova; 8 March 1978 (age 48) Burgas, Bulgaria
- Height: 5 ft 6 in (168 cm)
- Weight: Flyweight; Super flyweight; Bantamweight; Super bantamweight; Featherweight; Super featherweight; Lightweight

Boxing career
- Reach: 66 in (168 cm)
- Stance: Southpaw

Boxing record
- Total fights: 36
- Wins: 16
- Win by KO: 2
- Losses: 16
- Draws: 4

Galina Koleva Ivanova (Bulgarian: Галина Колева Иванова; born 8 March 1978) is a Bulgarian former professional boxer.

== Professional career ==
Ivanova turned professional in 1999 & compiled a record of 9–6–2 before defeating Anita Christensen, to win the WBA, WBC and GBU world titles. She defended the WBC title twice before losing it to Thailand's Usanakorn Thawilsuhannawang.

She would get another shot at the world title when she faced Csilla Nemedi Varga, for the WBA interim super-flyweight title. She would go on to win via unanimous decision.

== Professional boxing record ==
36 fights	16 wins	16 losses
By knockout	2	0
By decision	14	16
Draws	4	

No.	Result	Record	Opponent	Type	Round, time	Date	Location	Notes
36	Loss	16–16–4	Elena Gradinar	UD	8 (8)	2017-06-17	Kalev, Tallinn, Estonia	
35	Loss	16–15–4	Tatyana Zrazhevskaya	UD	10 (10)	2017-02-25	Event-Hall, Solnechny, Russia	
34	Loss	16–14–4	Vissia Trovato	UD	10 (10)	2016-11-05	Palestra Nuova, Ascona, Switzerland	For vacant IBO super-bantamweight title
33	Loss	16–13–4	Ashley Brace	PTS	6 (6)	2016-10-08	Rhondda Fach Sports Centre, Tylorstown, Wales	
32	Loss	16–12–4	Sandy Tsagouris	UD	8 (8)	2016-09-09	Masonic Temple, Toronto, Canada	
31	Loss	16–11–4	Mayerlin Rivas	UD	10 (10)	2015-10-10	El Poliedro, Caracas, Venezuela	
30	Win	16–10–4	Csilla Nemedi Varga	UD	10 (10)	2015-05-09	Gymnasium, Vratsa, Bulgaria	Won Interim WBA super-flyweight title
29	Draw	15–10–4	Karina Szmalenberg	MD	4 (4)	2015-03-21	Hala OSiR, ul. Krolowej Jadwigi 1, Brodnica, Poland	
28	Win	15–10–3	Jasmina Nad	UD	6 (6)	2014-07-03	Camay Beach, Sofia, Bulgaria	
27	Loss	14–10–3	Simona Galassi	TD	5 (10)	2014-05-23	Palasport, Molinella, Italy	For European flyweight title
26	Loss	14–9–3	Melania Sorroche	PTS	6 (6)	2014-02-08	Casal Cultural i Recreatiu, Castellbisbal, Spain	
25	Loss	14–8–3	Janeth Perez	SD	10 (10)	2013-11-30	Deportivo Agustín Ramos Millan, Toluca, Mexico	For vacant IBF bantamweight title
24	Win	14–7–3	Tzvetanka Mihailova	TKO	4 (6)	2013-07-05	Boxing Hall Diana, Sofia, Bulgaria	
23	Win	13–7–3	Dendi Fleis	UD	6 (6)	2012-05-18	Winter Sports Palace, Sofia, Bulgaria	
22	Win	12–7–3	Tonka Shalakova	RTD	1 (6)	2012-03-26	Boxing Hall Diana, Sofia, Bulgaria	
21	Loss	11–7–3	Usanakorn Thawilsuhannawang	UD	10 (10)	2009-10-05	Ban Rai School, Nakhon Ratchasima, Thailand	Lost WBC bantamweight title
20	Win	11–6–3	Oksana Vasileva	SD	10 (10)	2009-03-06	Sports Complex, Yakutsk, Russia	Retained WBC bantamweight title; Won WIBF bantamweight title
19	Draw	10–6–3	Zulina Muñoz	SD	10 (10)	2008-09-06	Grand Hotel, Tijuana, Mexico	Retained WBC bantamweight title
18	Win	10–6–2	Anita Christensen	UD	10 (10)	2008-06-21	Brøndbyhallen, Brøndbyvester, Denmark	Won WBA, WBC and GBU bantamweight titles
17	Loss	9–6–2	Ramona Kuehne	SD	10 (10)	2008-05-16	Ballhaus Arena, Aschersleben, Germany	For vacant WIBF lightweight title
16	Win	9–5–2	Myriam Chomaz	MD	10 (10)	2007-05-29	Parc des Sports, Pont-Audemer, France	Won vacant European featherweight title
15	Loss	8–5–2	Fatuma Zarika	UD	10 (10)	2007-03-03	Grand Regency Hotel, Nairobi, Kenya	For vacant WIBF bantamweight title
14	Loss	8–4–2	Reka Krempf	UD	10 (10)	2006-02-24	City Sporthall, Tápiószentmárton, Hungary	For WIBF super-flyweight title
13	Win	8–3–2	Floarea Lihet	PTS	6 (6)	2005-11-19	Trend Eventhotel Pyramide, Vienna, Austria	
12	Win	7–3–2	Suzana Radovanovic	UD	6 (6)	2005-10-29	Hristo Botev Sports Hall, Sofia, Bulgaria	
11	Win	6–3–2	Esther Schouten	SD	6 (6)	2005-09-10	Topsportcentrum, Rotterdam, Netherlands	
10	Draw	5–3–2	Esther Schouten	SD	10 (10)	2004-11-06	Velodrome, Amsterdam, Netherlands	For vacant WIBF super-bantamweight title
9	Loss	5–3–1	Bettina Csabi	UD	10 (10)	2004-04-17	Főnix Aréna, Debrecen, Bulgaria	For vacant WIBF and GBU bantamweight titles
8	Win	5–2–1	Daisy Lang	UD	10 (10)	2003-11-15	Oberfrankenhalle, Bayreuth, Germany	Won vacant WIBF super-flyweight title
7	Win	4–2–1	Maria Moroni	SD	10 (10)	2003-08-22	Terni, Italy	Won European featherweight title
6	Draw	3–2–1	Maria Moroni	SD	10 (10)	2003-03-07	Foligno, Italy	For European featherweight title
5	Loss	3–2	Diana Szilagyi	UD	10 (10)	2002-11-09	Trend Eventhotel Pyramide, Vienna, Austria	
4	Loss	3–1	Diana Szilagyi	PTS	6 (6)	2002-07-06	Vienna, Austria	
3	Win	3–0	Radostina Petrova	PTS	4 (4)	2001-09-28	Universiada Hall, Sofia, Bulgaria	
2	Win	2–0	Mirela Ruseva	PTS	4 (4)	1999-07-01	Plovdiv, Bulgaria	
1	Win	1–0	Tzvetanka Hristova	UD	6 (6)	1999-03-25	Sofia, Bulgaria	

== See also ==
- List of female boxers
- List of southpaw stance boxers

Sporting positions
Regional boxing titles
Preceded by Maria Moroni	European featherweight champion August 22, 2003 – 2004; Vacated	Vacant Title next held by Herself
Vacant Title last held by Herself	European featherweight champion May 29, 2007 – June 21, 2008; Won world title	Vacant Title next held by Gaelle Amand
Minor world boxing titles
Vacant Title last held by Judith Palecian	WIBF super-flyweight champion November 15, 2003 – 2004; Vacated	Vacant Title next held by Bettina Csabi
Preceded by Anita Christensen	GBU bantamweight champion June 21, 2008 – 2009; Vacated	Vacant Title next held by Aniya Seki
Preceded by Oksana Vasileva	WIBF bantamweight champion November 15, 2003 – 2004; Vacated	Vacant Title next held by Hagar Finer
Major world boxing titles
Preceded by Anita Christensen	WBA bantamweight champion June 21, 2008 – 2008; Vacated	Vacant Title next held by Emanuela Pantani
Preceded by Anita Christensen	WBC bantamweight champion June 21, 2008 – October 5, 2009	Succeeded by Usanakorn Thawilsuhannawang
New title	WBA super-flyweight champion Interim title May 9, 2015 – 2015; Vacated	Vacant
