= Demick =

Demick is a surname. Notable people with the surname include:

- Barbara Demick, American journalist
- Irina Demick (1936–2004), French actress
- Patricia Demick (born 1972), Chilean boxer
- Rod Demick (born 1947), British guitarist and bassist
