= Sharon Anyos =

Australian boxer (born 1970)

- Born: Sharon Lea Anne Anyos; 13 October 1970 (age 56); Geelong, Victoria, Australia
- Other names: Wild Thing
- Nationality: Australian
- Height: 164 cm (5 ft 5 in)
- Weight: 128.75 lb (58 kg; 9 st 3 lb)
- Division: featherweight
- Reach: 169 cm (66.5 in)

Professional boxing record
- Total: 17
- Wins: 14
- By knockout: 4
- Losses: 3
- By knockout: 0
- Draws: 0

Kickboxing record
- Total: 10
- Wins: 7
- Losses: 1
- Draws: 2

Other information
- Boxing record from BoxRec

Sharon Lea Anne Anyos (born 13 October 1970, Geelong, Victoria, Australia) is a retired Australian featherweight boxer, kickboxer, karate competitor and model.

Anyos held multiple World titles in boxing, including winning the first ever WBC World female featherweight title in 2005 against Marcela Acuña. Anyos successfully defended her World title against Esther Schouten in 2006. Anyos was awarded the WBC World Emeritus title in 2007, alongside other boxing legends including Kostya Tszyu, Vitali Klitschko, Lennox Lewis, Bernard Hopkins, Floyd Mayweather, Érik Morales and Laila Ali.

She was inducted into the International Women's Boxing Hall of Fame in 2020.

== Championships and awards ==
=== Boxing ===
- Australian female lightweight title (126¼Ibs)
- Oceania Boxing Association female super lightweight (135Ibs)
- Oceania Boxing Association female welterweight (138¾Ibs)
- Women's International Boxing Association World featherweight title (125¼Ibs)
- International Boxing Association female featherweight title (125¼Ibs)
- World Boxing Foundation female featherweight title (125Ibs)
- WBC World female featherweight title (123½Ibs)
- WBC World Emeritus female featherweight title

== Professional boxing record ==
17 fights	14 wins	3 losses
By knockout	4	0
By decision	10	3

No.	Result	Record	Opponent	Type	Round, time	Date	Location	Notes
17	Win	14–3	(Thailand) Chuthaporn Pradissan	UD	6	23 Feb 2007	Southport RSL Club, Southport, Queensland, Australia	
16	Win	13–3	(Netherlands) Esther Schouten	TKO	6 (10); 1:37	22 Sep 2006	Southport Sharks AFL Club, Southport, Queensland, Australia	Retained WBC female featherweight title
15	Win	12–3	(Thailand) Konsuay Deksukhothai	TKO	4 (8); 0:49	9 Jun 2006	Southport RSL Club, Southport, Queensland, Australia	
14	Win	11–3	(Argentina) Marcela Acuna	UD	10	22 Oct 2005	Gold Coast Convention Centre, Broadbeach, Queensland, Australia	Won inaugural WBC female featherweight title
13	Win	10–3	(New Zealand) Christina Tai	MD	6	31 Mar 2005	The Trusts Arena, Auckland, New Zealand	
12	Win	9–3	(Colombia) Nerys Rincon	TKO	7 (10); 0:01	23 Feb 2005	Vodafone Arena, Melbourne Park, Victoria, Australia	Retained WBF female featherweight title
11	Win	8–3	(Trinidad and Tobago) Lisa Brown	MD	10	10 Dec 2004	Southport Sharks AFL Club, Southport, Queensland, Australia	Retained WBF female featherweight title
10	Win	7–3	(Thailand) Linda Tenberg	UD	10	1 Oct 2004	Southport Sharks AFL Club, Southport, Queensland, Australia	Won vacant WBF female featherweight title
9	Lose	6–3	(Japan) Emiko Raika	MD	10	30 Nov 2003	Tokyo, Japan	For WIBA featherweight title
8	Lose	6–2	(Japan) Emiko Raika	SD	10	18 Dec 2002	Tokyo, Japan	Losy WIBA featherweight title
7	Win	6–1	(Australia) Holly Ferneley	UD	6	30 Nov 2001	Coolangatta Hotel, Coolangatta, Queensland, Australia	
6	Win	5–1	(United States) Jo Wyman	UD	10	14 Oct 2000	(United States) Epicenter, Rancho Cucamonga, California, USA	Won WIBA and vacant IBA female featherweight titles
5	Win	4–1	(United States) Cynthia Prouder	UD	4	6 May 2000	(United States) Fantasy Springs Casino, Indio, California, USA	
4	Lose	3–1	(United Kingdom) Jane Couch	UD	10	31 Oct 1999	David Lloyd Tennis Centre, Raynes Park, London, United Kingdom	For vacant WIBF and WBF female lightweight titles
3	Win	3–0	(New Zealand) Wena Karaka	UD	6	18 Sep 1999	Magic Millions Complex, Bundall, Gold Coast, Queensland, Australia	Won vacant OBA female welterweight title
2	Win	2–0	(Australia) Holly Ferneley	UD	6	15 Oct 1998	Southport RSL Club, Southport, Queensland, Australia	Won vacant OBA female light-welterweight title
1	Win	1–0	(Australia) Cathy Jones	TKO	2 (6); 0:53	4 Jul 1998	Carrara Basketball Stadium, Gold Coast, Queensland, Australia	Won Australian female lightweight title
