= Lisa Brown (boxer) =

Trinidad and Tobago boxer

Personal information
- Nickname: Bad News
- Born: January 17, 1971 (age 55) Laventille, Trinidad and Tobago
- Height: 5 ft 3 in (160 cm)
- Weight: Bantamweight; Super bantamweight; Featherweight

Boxing career
- Stance: Southpaw

Boxing record
- Total fights: 29
- Wins: 20
- Win by KO: 6
- Losses: 6
- Draws: 3

Lisa Brown (born January 17, 1971, in Port of Spain, Trinidad and Tobago) is a Trinidadian boxer. During her career, from which she retired, she held the WIBA and WBA super bantamweight titles.

== Early life ==
Lisa Brown was born 17 January 1971, in the city of Port of Spain in Trinidad and Tobago. Brown was born into a family of four as the only girl. Brown was interested in cricket in Trinidad. When she emigrated to Canada at the age of 17 she searched for a similar sport, but cricket wasn't as recognized in Canada.

She married professional boxer Errol Brown who discovered her talent and encouraged her to get into boxing. He also became her trainer. At first she was hesitant, but after she saw Christy Martin fight Deirdre Gogarty in 1996 it inspired her to start boxing.

== Amateur career ==
Brown began boxing as an amateur in 1997 when she was 26 years old. As an amateur she fought 32 fights, she won 26 of them, and won her first amateur fight by a knockout. During this period she also fought some of the Canadian national team members.

She also took part in the Canadian National Championships in 1998 and 1999. On January 17, 1998, she fought in the finals against Patricia Picotin in Edmonton, she won a silver medal. On January 24, 1999, she won the Canadian National Championships by a walkover. She also fought in the Canadian national team for a couple of years. On March 24, 1999, she fought Frida Emanuelsson in the Canada-Sweden Dual.

She finished her amateur career with a 26–6 record before turning professional.

== Professional career ==
Brown made her pro boxing debut against Leilani Salazar at the Convention Center in Tucson on May 5, 2000. Beating her opponent with a TKO in the fourth round. She started her career with eight wins in a row. She would beat her opponents in their home town, which earned her the nickname, "Bad News".

On September 1, 2001, Lisa Brown faced Leona Brown for the second time in a row that year. The fight was held at Cedarbridge Academy in Bermuda. In her first fight Lisa beat Leona by a six round unanimous decision in the Civic Center earlier that year.

On September 23, 2005, Lisa Brown fought Jackie Chavez at the Jean Pierre Sports Complex in Port of Spain, Brown won the WIBC and WIBA junior featherweight titles with a ten round unanimous decision over Jackie Chavez.

On March 22, 2007, at the Isleta Casino & Resort in Albuquerque, Lisa Brown faced Jackie Chavez again for the IFBA junior featherweight title, Brown was again the victor, winning by unanimous decision over ten rounds.

On March 7, 2009, at the Jean Pierre Sports Complex in Port of Spain, Brown won the WIBA junior featherweight title. She TKO'd her opponent Maribel Santana in the third round at the 1:45 mark.

On March 27, 2010, at the Casino Rama in Ramara, Brown fought Ana Julaton for the vacant WBA super bantamweight title and won the fight with a unanimous decision.

On November 19, 2011, Brown fought again for the WIBA junior featherweight title. She fought against Angela Marciales at the Queen's Park Oval in Port of Spain. She won the fight by a TKO in the fourth round at the 1:26 mark.

On August 18, 2012, Brown fought Jackie Nava for the WBA super-bantamweight title. She would lose via third round stoppage.

In her last fight on September 21, 2013, she beat Amanda Beaudin with a split decision and hasn't fought since.

Brown was inducted into the International Women's Boxing Hall of Fame in 2020.

== Professional boxing record ==
29 fights	20 wins	6 losses
By knockout	6	1
By decision	14	5
Draws	3	

No.	Result	Record	Opponent	Type	Round, time	Date	Location	Notes
29	Win	20–6–3	Amanda Beaudin	SD	6	21 Sep 2013	Halifax Forum, Halifax, Canada	
28	Loss	19–6–3	Jackie Nava	TKO	3 (10), 1:42	18 Aug 2012	La Cetto Vineyard, Valle de Guadalupe, Mexico	For WBA super-bantamweight title
27	Win	19–5–3	Angela Marciales	TKO	4 (10), 1:26	19 Nov 2011	Queen's Park Oval, Port of Spain, Trinidad and Tobago	Won vacant WIBA super-bantamweight title
26	Loss	18–5–3	Chantal Martínez	UD	10	2 Apr 2011	Roberto Durán Arena, Panama City, Panama	Lost WBA super-bantamweight title
25	Win	18–4–3	Jeri Sitzes	UD	8	30 Oct 2010	Casino Rama, Rama, Canada	
24	Win	17–4–3	Ana Julaton	UD	10	27 Mar 2010	Casino Rama, Rama, Canada	Won vacant WBA super-bantamweight title
23	Loss	16–4–3	Hyo Min Kim	UD	10	15 Oct 2009	Songdo Convensia, Incheon, South Korea	For vacant IFBA featherweight title
22	Win	16–3–3	Maribel Santana	TKO	3 (10), 1:45	7 Mar 2009	Jean Pierre Sports Complex, Port of Spain, Trinidad and Tobago	Won vacant WIBA super-bantamweight title
21	Win	15–3–3	Alicia Ashley	SD	10	12 Jun 2008	Mohegan Sun Arena, Uncasville, Connecticut, U.S.	Retained IFBA super-bantamweight title
20	Win	14–3–3	Jeri Sitzes	UD	10	7 Feb 2008	Pechanga Resort Casino, Temecula, California, U.S.	Retained IFBA super-bantamweight title
19	Win	13–3–3	Jackie Chavez	UD	10	22 Mar 2007	Isleta Casino & Resort, Albuquerque, New Mexico, U.S.	Won vacant IFBA super-bantamweight title
18	Loss	12–3–3	Melissa Hernández	UD	10	4 Nov 2006	Shaw Conference Centre, Edmonton, Canada	For vacant WIBA super-bantamweight title
17	Draw	12–2–3	Jeannine Garside	MD	10	23 Jun 2006	Shaw Conference Centre, Edmonton, Canada	For WIBA super-bantamweight title
16	Loss	12–2–2	Jeannine Garside	UD	10	18 Nov 2005	Shaw Conference Centre, Edmonton, Canada	Lost WIBA super-bantamweight title
15	Win	12–1–2	Jackie Chavez	UD	10	23 Sep 2005	Jean Pierre Sports Complex, Port of Spain, Trinidad and Tobago	Won vacant WIBA super-bantamweight title
14	Win	11–1–2	Kelli Cofer	UD	6	18 Jun 2005	Shaw Conference Centre, Edmonton, Canada	
13	Win	10–1–2	Stephaney George	KO	2 (6), 1:18	18 Feb 2005	The Docks Nightclub, Toronto, Canada	
12	Loss	9–1–2	Sharon Anyos	MD	10	10 Dec 2004	Southport Sharks AFL Club, Southport, Australia	For WBF featherweight title
11	Win	9–0–2	Jeri Sitzes	UD	6	26 May 2004	Ameristar Casino Kansas City, Kansas City, Missouri, U.S.	
10	Draw	8–0–2	Ada Vélez	MD	10	30 Oct 2003	Seminole Casino Coconut Creek, Coconut Creek, Florida, U.S.	For WIBA bantamweight title
9	Draw	8–0–1	Kelli Cofer	PTS	6	11 Jul 2003	Civic Center, Canton, Ohio, U.S.	
8	Win	8–0	Olga Heron	UD	4	26 Apr 2003	Hamilton Place Theatre, Hamilton, Canada	
7	Win	7–0	Karen Martin	UD	6	21 Dec 2002	Memorial Auditorium, Fort Lauderdale, Florida, U.S.	
6	Win	6–0	Leona Brown	PTS	10	1 Sep 2001	Cedarbridge Academy, Devonshire Parish, Bermuda	
5	Win	5–0	Leona Brown	UD	6	27 Apr 2001	Civic Center, Niagara Falls, New York, U.S.	
4	Win	4–0	Donna Parsons	UD	4	11 Nov 2000	Skylon Tower, Niagara Falls, Canada	
3	Win	3–0	Shondell Alfred	TKO	2 (4), 1:06	23 Sep 2000	Casino Rama, Rama, Canada	
2	Win	2–0	Jeanette Sanabria	TKO	1 (4), 0:32	27 Jun 2000	Orangeville, Canada	
1	Win	1–0	Leilani Salazar	TKO	4 (4), 0:49	5 May 2000	Tucson Convention Center, Tucson, Arizona, U.S.	

== See also ==
- List of female boxers
- List of southpaw stance boxers

Sporting positions
Minor world boxing titles
Vacant Title last held by Marcela Acuña	WIBA super-bantamweight champion September 23, 2005 – November 18, 2005	Succeeded by Jeannine Garside
Vacant Title last held by Jackie Chavez	IFBA super-bantamweight champion March 22, 2007 – March 27, 2010; Won WBA title	Vacant Title next held by Kaliesha West
Vacant Title last held by Melissa Hernández	WIBA super-bantamweight champion March 7, 2009 – March 27, 2010; Won WBA title	Vacant Title next held by Herself
Vacant Title last held by Herself	WIBA super-bantamweight champion November 19, 2011 – 2012; Vacated	Vacant Title next held by Jessica Rakoczy
Major world boxing titles
Vacant Title last held by Marcela Acuña	WBA super-bantamweight champion March 27, 2010 – April 2, 2011	Succeeded by Chantal Martínez
