= Usanakorn Thawilsuhannawang =

Thai boxer

Usanakorn Kokietgym อุษณกร โกเกียรติยิม
Personal information
- Born: Usanakorn Thawilsuhannawang; December 31, 1987 (age 38) Nakhon Ratchasima, Thailand
- Height: 5 ft 7 in (170 cm)
- Weight: Super flyweight; Bantamweight; Lightweight

Boxing career
- Reach: 69 in (175 cm)
- Stance: Southpaw

Boxing record
- Total fights: 31
- Wins: 21
- Win by KO: 20
- Losses: 10
Medal record
Women's Amateur boxing
Representing Thailand
Southeast Asian Games
Gold medal – first place	2005 Manila	Light flyweight
Gold medal – first place	2007 Nakhon Ratchasima	Light bantamweight

Usanakorn Thawilsuhannawang (Thai: อุษณากร ถวิลสุวรรณวัง; born 31 December 1987), better known by her ring name Usanakorn Kokietgym (Thai: อุษณากร ก่อเกียรติยิม), is a female bantamweight professional boxer from Nakhon Ratchasima province, Thailand. She is a former WBC female world bantamweight champion.

Additionally, Usanakorn is a former two-time SEA Games boxing gold medalist at the 2005 and 2007 SEA Games.

== Professional boxing career ==
On March 2, 2009, Usanakorn defeated Rie Fujimoto by fourth-round knockout to win the interim WBC women's world super flyweight championship. She was set to face Ana Maria Torres in a title unification bout on June 13, 2009.

On October 5, 2009, Usanakorn defeated Galina Koleva Ivanova by unanimous to win the WBC female world bantamweight championship. She made one successful title defense against Dong Xiao Juan on October 4, 2011.

Usanakorn lost the WBC female world bantamweight title to Susie Ramadan by unanimous decision July 13, 2012. There was controversy after the fight when Ramadan claimed that Usanakorn was male. Usanakorn tested for "highly suspicious" levels of testosterone before her fight with Ramadan in Melbourne. According to The Sydney Morning Herald, Usanakorn tested for three times the amount of testosterone normally found in a woman.

== Bare-knuckle boxing career ==
=== BKFC Thailand ===
Usanakorn made her bare-knuckle boxing debut at BKFC Thailand 2: Iconic Impact on May 7, 2022. She defeated Benjamas Phakra by first-round knockout.

On September 3, 2022, Usanakorn defeated Natsuda Yooya by first-round knockout at BKFC Thailand 3: Moment of Truth.

== Professional boxing record ==
31 fights	21 wins	10 losses
By knockout	20	3
By decision	1	7

No.	Result	Record	Opponent	Type	Round, time	Date	Location	Notes
31	Loss	21–10	Skye Falzon	TKO	5 (10)	Aug 23, 2025	Bay Pavilions, Batemans Bay, Australia	
30	Win	21–9	Patraporn Kaenmeepol	TKO	1 (4), 1:39	Jun 22, 2025	Singmanassak Muaythai School, Pathum Thani, Thailand	
29	Loss	20–9	Weisa Li	UD	6	May 22, 2025	Suan Lum Night Bazaar, Bangkok, Thailand	
28	Loss	20–8	Samantha Quek	UD	6	Feb 5, 2025	Thai Payak Boxing Gym, Thanyaburi Town, Thailand	
27	Loss	20–7	Elif Nur Turhan	KO	1 (6), 1:24	Dec 27, 2024	Marriott Hotel, Ankara, Turkey	
26	Win	20–6	Piyathida Aimthuam	TKO	3 (6), 1:38	Aug 24, 2024	Singmanassak Muaythai School, Pathum Thani, Thailand	
25	Loss	19–6	Louise Creaven	UD	5	May 31, 2024	Gold Coast Turf Club, Surfers Paradise, Australia	
24	Loss	19–5	Ella Boot	TKO	5 (10), 0:16	Mar 23, 2024	Bankstown City Paceway, Condell Park, Australia	For vacant WBC Silver lightweight title
23	Win	19–4	Putchita Klahan	TKO	3 (8), 1:37	Jul 16, 2023	Singmanassak Muaythai School, Pathum Thani, Thailand	
22	Loss	18–4	Sara Jalonen	UD	6	Jun 18, 2023	Singmanassak Muaythai School, Pathum Thani, Thailand	
21	Win	18–3	Wilaiwan Naemkrathok	TKO	3 (6), 2:00	Apr 20, 2023	Singmanassak Muaythai School, Pathum Thani, Thailand	
20	Win	17–3	Jaruwan Sosannoy	TKO	2 (8), 1:44	Jan 14, 2023	Singmanassak Muaythai School, Pathum Thani, Thailand	
19	Loss	16–3	Mea Motu	UD	8	Oct 21, 2022	ABA Stadium, Auckland, New Zealand	
18	Win	16–2	Somwang Sawinchai	TKO	2 (6), 1:36	May 1, 2022	Singmanassak Muaythai School, Pathum Thani, Thailand	
17	Win	15–2	Namwaan Sithpracha	KO	1 (6)	Mar 8, 2013	Khian Sa, Thailand	
16	Win	14–2	Li Yun Ting	TKO	3 (6)	Dec 14, 2012	Chaiya, Thailand	
15	Win	13–2	Lu Run	TKO	2 (10), 1:11	Oct 4, 2012	Ban Rai Temple, Nakhon Ratchasima, Thailand	Won vacant WBC Silver bantamweight title
14	Win	12–2	Kou Jin Ying	TKO	2 (6), 1:38	Aug 10, 2012	Huai Krachao, Kanchanaburi, Thailand	
13	Loss	11–2	Susie Ramadan	UD	10	Jul 13, 2012	The Melbourne Pavilion, Melbourne, Australia	Lost WBC bantamweight title
12	Win	11–1	Dong Xiao Juan	TKO	3 (10), 1:50	Oct 4, 2011	Ban Rai Temple, Nakhon Ratchasima, Thailand	Retained WBC bantamweight title
11	Win	10–1	Eliger Geon	TKO	2 (6)	Aug 15, 2011	San Sai Luang, Thailand	
10	Win	9–1	Qi Liu	TKO	4 (6)	Jun 10, 2011	Bannongyai School, Thep Sathit, Thailand	
9	Win	8–1	Nigora Shaumarova	TKO	2 (6)	Jan 14, 2011	Uthaikiri Resort, Uthai, Thailand	
8	Win	7–1	Zhi Xin Qiu	TKO	2 (6)	Oct 4, 2010	Ban Rai Temple, Nakhon Ratchasima, Thailand	
7	Win	6–1	Yoon Joo Shin	KO	1 (6)	Jul 29, 2010	City Hall Ground, Nakhon Ratchasima, Thailand	Retained WBC bantamweight title
6	Win	5–1	Galina Ivanova	UD	10	Oct 5, 2009	Ban Rai School, Nakhon Ratchasima, Thailand	Won WBC bantamweight title
5	Loss	4–1	Ana María Torres	UD	10	Jun 13, 2009	Centro Banamex, Mexico City, Mexico	For WBC super-flyweight title
4	Win	4–0	Rie Fujimoto	KO	4 (10)	Mar 2, 2009	Phang Nga, Thailand	Won Interim WBC super-flyweight title
3	Win	3–0	Yu Sin Lu	KO	1 (6)	Nov 28, 2008	Amnart Charoen, Thailand	
2	Win	2–0	Geremie Tabastabas	TKO	3 (8); 0:31	Sep 14, 2008	Cebu Coliseum, Cebu City, Philippines	
1	Win	1–0	Dong Xiao Juan	KO	6 (10)	Jul 16, 2008	Provincial Court Ground, Phatthalung, Thailand	Won vacant PABA super-flyweight title

== Bare-knuckle boxing record ==
Professional record breakdown
2 matches	2 wins	0 losses
By knockout	2	0

Res.	Record	Opponent	Method	Event	Date	Round	Time	Location	Notes
Win	2–0	Natsuda Yooya	KO (punches)	BKFC Thailand 3	September 3, 2022	1	1:12	Bangkok, Thailand	
Win	1–0	Benjamas Phakra	KO (punches)	BKFC Thailand 2	May 7, 2022	3	0:49	Pattaya, Thailand	

== See also ==
- List of female boxers
- List of southpaw stance boxers

Sporting positions
Regional boxing titles
New title	PABA super-flyweight champion July 16, 2008 – 2009; Vacated	Vacant Title next held by Hye Soo Park
Vacant Title last held by Zulina Muñoz	WBC Silver bantamweight champion October 4, 2012 – 2013; Vacated	Vacant Title next held by Catherine Phiri
World boxing titles
Vacant Title last held by Ana María Torres	WBC super-flyweight champion Interim title March 2, 2009 – June 13, 2009; Lost in bid for full title	Vacant Title next held by Sonia Osorio
Preceded by Galina Ivanova	WBC bantamweight champion October 5, 2009 – July 13, 2012	Succeeded by Susie Ramadan
