= Mary Ann Almager =

American boxer

Personal information
- Nationality: American
- Born: December 5, 1968 (age 57) Seminole, Texas, U.S.
- Height: 1.73 m (5 ft 8 in)
- Weight: Middleweight and light heavyweight

Boxing career
- Reach: 1.70 m (67 in)
- Stance: Orthodox

Boxing record
- Total fights: 22
- Wins: 14
- Win by KO: 9
- Losses: 8
- No contests: 0

Mary Ann Almager (born December 5, 1968) is an American former professional female boxer. Born in Seminole, Texas, she is a resident of Ruidoso, New Mexico. Her nickname is "Gorgeous".

Almager was attracted to boxing after her two brothers started practicing it, and by age nine, she joined them at a local boxing gym. Almager later developed into a high-school athlete, playing basketball and volleyball as well as getting involved in track and field. Her dream was to become a softball player, but a knee injury forced her out of that sport.

== Professional boxing career ==
On February 5, 1993, 24-year-old Almager made her professional boxing debut by defeating Angela Adger by a fourth-round technical knockout at Dallas, Texas. She then made her Las Vegas boxing debut when she faced 3-0-1 Helga Risoy at the Silver Nugget hotel exactly one year and four days after her first fight, on February 9, 1994. She scored a first-round knockout over the previously undefeated Risoy.

A rematch with Risoy followed, on April 2, 1994 at the Aladdin Hotel in Las Vegas. This time, Almager imposed over Risoy by a third-round knockout. Then, she faced future world champion, Ireland's Deirdre Gogarty, on July 22, also at the Aladdin. Almager won a six-round unanimous decision.

On April 20, 1995, again at the Aladdin Hotel and Casino, she faced Deirdre Nelson, who was making her professional women's boxing debut that same night, for the WIBF's vacant world Super Welterweight title. Almager became a world champion by knocking Nelson out in two rounds.

She then faced Gina Guidi in a non-title affair, March 23, 1996, beating the until then undefeated (3-0) Guidi by a six-round split decision. On July 27, 1996 at El Paso, Texas, Almager had the first of two mismatches in a row, facing 0-2 Jackie Rodgers and winning by second-round technical knockout. She then faced 0-1 Sharon Taylor on September 16, at Arizona Charlie's in Las Vegas, beating Taylor by a first-round knockout.

Then, on November 9 of the same year (1996), she had her first, and ultimately only, fight abroad as a professional, when she opposed Valérie Wiet-Henin at the Tokyo Bay NK Hall in Tokyo, Japan. Henin had previously been a world champion kick-boxer but was making her professional debut. Despite Almager's experience advantage, Henin defeated Almager by a ninth-round knockout.

Almager returned to action on August 16, 1997, facing Sherrie Painter in Ruidoso. Almager won this fight by a first-round knockout. On March 23, 1998, she fought Lucia Rijker at the Foxwoods Resort in Ledyard, Connecticut, losing by a first-round knockout.

Despite that defeat, she was given a shot at recovering her WIBF world Super Welterweight title three months later, and on August 21, 1998, Almager regained the title by knocking out 8-1 Gina Nicholas in the second round at Baton Rouge, Louisiana.

Almager took almost two years off boxing once she regained her title; on her next fight, she met an up-and-coming Ann Wolfe in a non-title affair, on February 11, 2000, at Kenner, Louisiana. Wolfe handled Almager by first-round knockout.

On May 5, 2000, Almager returned to the winning column by taking on Suzette Taylor, 10-2-1, at the Hard Rock Hotel and Casino in Las Vegas and defeating Taylor by a six-round split decision. But then she faced Valerie Mahfood for the vacant IWBF's Super Middleweight title on August 10 at the Astro Hall in Houston, losing to Mahfood by a fifth-round technical knockout.

Almager then proceeded to face Trina Ortegon twice, meeting the 9-2 fighter at the Sky City Casino in Acoma, New Mexico, April 20, 2001, and winning by decision in ten rounds to win her second world title, the Women's International Boxing Association's Middleweight championship, and then facing her in a rematch on August 17, at the same site, and defending the title. In their rematch, Almager retained the title by ninth-round technical knockout.

Almager's next fight was also a rematch, as on June 14, 2002, she and Mahfood had a return fight; this time at the Civic Center in Beaumont, Texas. Mahfood once again defeated Almager, but this time only by a close, eight round split decision. On August 8, 2002, Almager boxed Dakota Stone, 5-1-2, at the Ector County Coliseum in Odessa, Texas, winning an eight-round unanimous decision in what would turn out to be her last win as a professional boxer.

Mary Ann Almager then fought Laila Ali at the Louisville Gardens in Louisville, Kentucky, losing to the undefeated (13-0) star by a fourth-round technical knockout, February 14, 2003. On August 22, she fought another undefeated foe, 10-0-2 Nikki Eplion, losing an eight-round unanimous decision to Eplion.

On September 10, 2004, Almager fought what was both her last world title try and her last fight as a professional women's boxer, when she challenged Jacqui Frazier-Lyde for the vacant UBA's women's world Heavyweight title. Despite putting in a hard effort and flooring Frazier–Lyde twice for the only times in Frazier-Lyde's career, Almager was deemed the loser by a ten-round unanimous decision, retiring soon after. It was also Frazier-Lyde's last fight.

Almager was a three-time world champion in two different divisions. She had a record of 14 wins and 8 losses in 22 professional fights, 9 wins by way of knockout.

== Professional boxing record ==
22 fights	14 wins	8 losses
By knockout	9	5
By decision	5	3
Draws	0	

No.	Result	Record	Opponent	Type	Round, time	Date	Location	Notes
22	Loss	14-8	(United States) Jacqui Frazier-Lyde	UD	10	2004-09-10	Tropicana Hotel & Casino, Atlantic City	
21	Loss	14-7	(United States) Nikki Eplion	UD	8	2003-08-22	Ector County Coliseum, Odessa	
20	Loss	14-6	(United States) Laila Ali	TKO	4(10)	2003-02-14	Louisville Gardens, Louisville	International Boxing Association Female Super Middleweight Title International Women's Boxing Federation World Super Middleweight Title Women's International Boxing Association World Super Middleweight Title
19	Win	14-5	(United States) Dakota Stone	UD	8	2002-08-02	Ector County Coliseum, Odessa	
18	Loss	13-5	(United States) Valerie Mahfood	SD	8	2002-06-14	Civic Center, Beaumont	
17	Win	13-4	(United States) Trina Ortegon	TKO	9(10)	2001-08-17	Sky City Casino, Acoma	Defended Women's International Boxing Association World Middleweight Title
16	Win	12-4	(United States) Trina Ortegon	PTS	10	2001-04-20	Sky City Casino, Acoma	Won Women's International Boxing Association World Middleweight Title
15	Loss	11-4	(United States) Valerie Mahfood	TKO	5(10)	2000-08-10	Astro Hall, Houston	For vacant International Women's Boxing Federation World Super Middleweight Title
14	Win	11-3	(United States) Suzette Taylor	SD	6	2000-05-05	Hard Rock Hotel and Casino, Las Vegas	
13	Loss	10-3	(United States) Ann Wolfe	TKO	1(6)	2000-02-11	Kenner	
12	Win	10-2	(United States) Gina Nicholas	TKO	2(10)	1998-08-21	Baton Rouge	Won International Women's Boxing Federation World Super Welterweight Title
11	Loss	9-2	(Netherlands) Lucia Rijker	TKO	1(6)	1998-03-23	Foxwoods Resort, Mashantucket	
10	Win	9-1	(United States) Sherrie Painter	TKO	1(6)	1997-08-16	Ruidoso	
9	Loss	8-1	(France) Valérie Hénin	TKO	9(10)	1996-11-03	Tokyo Bay NK Hall, Urayasu	Lost Women's International Boxing Federation World Super Welterweight Title
8	Win	8-0	(United States) Sharon Taylor	TKO	1(4)	1996-09-16	Arizona Charlie's, Las Vegas	
7	Win	7-0	(United States) Jackie Rodgers	TKO	2(6)	1996-07-27	El Paso	
6	Win	6-0	(United States) Gina Guidi	SD	6	1996-03-23	Hyatt Regency Hotel, Monterey	
5	Win	5-0	(Republic of Ireland) Deirdre Nelson	TKO	2(10)	1995-04-20	Aladdin Hotel & Casino, Las Vegas	Won vacant Women's International Boxing Federation World Super Welterweight Title
4	Win	4-0	(Republic of Ireland) Deirdre Gogarty	UD	6	1994-07-22	The Aladdin, Las Vegas	
3	Win	3-0	(Norway) Helga Risoy	TKO	3(4)	1994-04-02	Aladdin Hotel & Casino, Las Vegas	
2	Win	2-0	(Norway) Helga Risoy	TKO	1(4)	1994-02-09	Silver Nugget, North Las Vegas	
1	Win	1-0	(United States) Angela Adger	TKO	4	1993-02-05	Dallas	Pro Debut.
