= Jacqui Frazier-Lyde =

American boxer

Personal information
- Nickname: Sister Smoke
- Nationality: United States
- Born: Jacqueline Frazier; December 2, 1961 (age 64) Beaufort, South Carolina, U.S.
- Height: 1.75 m (5 ft 9 in)
- Weight: Super middleweight Light heavyweight Heavyweight

Boxing career
- Reach: 1.75 m (69 in)
- Stance: Orthodox

Boxing record
- Total fights: 15
- Wins: 13
- Win by KO: 9
- Losses: 1
- Draws: 0
- No contests: 1

Jacqueline "Jacqui" Frazier-Lyde (born Jacqueline Frazier; December 2, 1961) is an American lawyer and former professional boxer. She is the daughter of former world Heavyweight boxing champion Joe Frazier. In January 2000, at the age of 38, Frazier announced that she would begin participating in the sport of boxing. Frazier-Lyde was inducted into the International Women's Boxing Hall of Fame in 2024.

== Early life and education ==
Frazier was born in Beaufort, South Carolina on December 2, 1961, the daughter of former heavyweight boxing champion Joe Frazier. She later relocated to Montgomery County, Pennsylvania, where she attended Plymouth-Whitemarsh, where she was a student athlete in softball, basketball, lacrosse, and hockey. Frazier received a scholarship to American University in Washington D.C., where she played basketball and majored in criminal justice. Frazier earned her Juris Doctor at Villanova University School of Law in Villanova, Pennsylvania.

== Career ==
After graduating from Villanova School of Law, Frazier practiced law and later opened her own firm. In 2008, Frazier was elected as a municipal court judge in Philadelphia.

=== Boxing ===
Inspired by Laila Ali's participation in the sport and eager to avenge the losses her father suffered at the hands of Ali's father, Muhammad Ali in two of their three fights, Frazier-Lyde began her career on February 6, 2000, knocking out Teela Reese in first round.

Laila Ali was 9–0 (8 knockouts) and Jacqui Frazier-Lyde was 7–0 (7 knockouts) when they starred on the first Pay Per View boxing card ever to be headlined by women. At 39 years of age, Frazier-Lyde was 16 years older than Ali. The bout was nicknamed Ali-Frazier IV by the media, alluding to their fathers' trilogy of fights in 1971, 1974, and 1975. It was boxed on June 8, 2001, to headline the weekend activities of the International Boxing Hall Of Fame induction ceremonies. Ali won the fight by a majority decision (79–73, 77–75, 76–76).

On December 14, 2001, Frazier-Lyde won the WIBA Light Heavyweight Title with a fourth-round TKO win over Suzette Taylor in Philadelphia, with Joe and Jacqui becoming the first father-daughter world champions in boxing. She added the WIBF Intercontinental Super Middleweight title on July 27, 2002, with a third-round TKO win over Heidi Hartmann. Frazier-Lyde successfully defended her WIBF Intercontinental Super Middleweight title on two occasions, defeating Kendra Lenhart and Shirvelle Williams by unanimous decisions, the latter by an 80–72 shut-out on all three judges' scorecards. Lenhart and Williams, along with Frazier-Lyde, are the only three women to have taken Laila Ali (24–0, with 21 knockouts) the distance in boxing fights.

Frazier-Lyde's last two fights were in the Heavyweight division, with her opponent on August 31, 2004, Carley Pesente, weighing in at 213lbs, thus being the heaviest opponent that Frazier-Lyde had faced during her boxing career. Frazier-Lyde won the fight by a shut-out unanimous decision (40–36, 40–36, 40–36). On September 10, 2004, Frazier-Lyde won the UBA World Heavyweight title by unanimous decision (97–92, 96–92, 95–93) against Mary Ann Almager, despite Frazier-Lyde being knocked down twice by Almager for the only times in her career. This fight was to be Frazier-Lyde's last boxing fight.

Frazier-Lyde ended her career with a record of 13 wins, 9 by knockout, and 1 loss.

== Professional boxing record ==
13 Wins (9 knockouts, 4 decisions), 1 Loss (0 knockouts, 1 decision), 0 Draws, 1 No Contest

Number	Date	Result	Round	Method	Opponent	Nationality	Note
1	February 6, 2000	Win	1R 1:23	TKO	Teela Reese	United States	
2	March 19, 2000	Win	3R 0:21	TKO	Annie Brooks	USA	
3	April 7, 2000	Win	1R 0:59	TKO	Wanda Gamble	USA	
4	May 19, 2000	Win	4R 1:04	TKO	Norma Galloway	USA	
5	September 27, 2000	Win	4R 1:17	KO	Darlene Sabo	USA	
6	November 17, 2000	Win	1R 1:06	KO	Nicolyn Armstrong	USA	
7	March 2, 2001	Win	1R 1:05	TKO	Genevia Buckhalter	USA	
8	June 8, 2001	Loss	8R	MD (73–79, 75–77, 76–76)	Laila Ali	USA	First pay-per-view boxing card to be headlined by women
9	December 14, 2001	Win	4R 1:44	TKO	Suzette Taylor	USA	WIBA Light Heavyweight title match
10	June 4, 2002	NC	3R 1:14	No Contest	Erin Toughill	USA	Toughill unable to continue after an accidental clash of heads
11	July 27, 2002	Win	3R 0:50	TKO	Heidi Hartmann	Germany	WIBF Intercontinental Super Middleweight title match
12	December 13, 2002	Win	10R	UD (99–90, 98–91, 98–91)	Kendra Lenhart	USA	For WIBF Intercontinental Super Middleweight title
13	March 21, 2003	Win	8R	UD (80–72, 80–72, 80–72)	Shirvelle Williams	USA	For WIBF Intercontinental Super Middleweight title
14	August 31, 2004	Win	4R	UD (40–36, 40–36, 40–36)	Carley Pesente	USA	
15	September 10, 2004	Win	10R	UD (97–92, 96–92, 95–93)	Mary Ann Almager	USA	UBA World Heavyweight title
