= Valérie Hénin =

French sportsperson

Valérie Wiet-Henin
- Born: Valérie Hénin; 15 November 1967 (age 58); Nancy, France
- Nationality: French
- Height: 5 ft 8 in (1.73 m)
- Division: Lightweight (kickboxing); Welterweight (boxing)
- Style: Muay Thai, boxing, taekwondo
- Rank: black belt in Taekwondo

Professional boxing record
- Total: 3
- Wins: 2
- By knockout: 1
- Draws: 1

Kickboxing record
- Total: 40
- Wins: 36
- By knockout: 21
- Losses: 3
- Draws: 1

Mixed martial arts record
- Total: 1
- Wins: 0
- Losses: 1
- By submission: 1

Other information
- Boxing record from BoxRec
- Mixed martial arts record from Sherdog

Valérie Hénin (born 15 November 1967) is a French boxer, kickboxer and Muay Thai fighter. She is a former ISKA World Kickboxing champion and the former WIBF Welterweight boxing champion.

== Boxing ==
On Valerie Henin boxing debut she fought Mary Ann Almager in order to become a WIBF world Welterweight champion.

On 16 June 2001, Henin fought Patricia Demick in Anchorage, Alaska, for the WIBF world Welterweight title. The fight ended in a draw.

== Personal life ==
Valerie Henin was married to kickboxer Orlando Wiet and had a daughter called Magda Wiet-Hénin a taekwondo Olympian.

== Championships and accomplishments ==
- 1994 ISKA World Kickboxing Champion
- 1996 WIBF world Welterweight title
- 2000 European Taekwondo Championships bronze medal

== Professional boxing record ==
3 fights	2 wins	0 losses
By knockout	1	0
By decision	1	0
Draws	1	

No.	Result	Record	Opponent	Type	Round, time	Date	Location	Notes
1	Win	1-0	(United States) Mary Ann Almager	TKO	9(10)	3 November 1996	(Japan) Tokyo Bay NK Hall, Urayasu	Won Women's International Boxing Federation World Super Welterweight Title
