= Chantal Martínez =

Panamanian boxer (born 1990)

Personal information
- Nickname: La Fiera
- Born: Chantal Liseth Martínez Rodriguez; 28 December 1990 (age 35) David, Chiriquí, Panama
- Weight: Super-bantamweight; Featherweight

Boxing career
- Stance: Orthodox

Boxing record
- Total fights: 29
- Wins: 21
- Win by KO: 8
- Losses: 8

Chantal Liseth Martínez Rodriguez (born 28 December 1990) is a Panamanian former professional boxer who competed from 2006 to 2023. She held the WBA female super-bantamweight title from 2011 to 2012 and challenged once for the WBC female super-bantamweight title in 2013.

== Professional career ==
Martínez began her professional career at 15 on 15 July 2006 in El Valle de Antón, where she lost her first fight to Carolina Alvarez of Venezuela and again on 29 December. On 27 April 2007, she won her first fight against Juseth Araúz in Panama City.

In April 2011, Martínez won the 122-pound super bantamweight championship of the World Boxing Association after defeating Trinidadian Lisa Brown. In June of that year, she made her defense of the title and defeated fellow Panamanian Paulina Cardona. In September, she again successfully defended her title by defeating Dominican Marilyn La Cachorrita Hernández, a fight that Romina Arroyo of Argentina refereed.

After a two-year and three month hiatus starting on 20 April 2013 (that day being defeated by Alicia Ashley), Martínez returned to the boxing scene to challenge Liliana Palmera.

== Professional boxing record ==
29 fights	21 wins	8 losses
By knockout	8	1
By decision	13	7

No.	Result	Record	Opponent	Type	Round, time	Date	Location	Notes
29	Win	21–8	(Venezuela) Sara Anti Gabriel	UD	6	26 Aug 2023	Chiriqui Mall, David, Panama	
28	Win	20–8	(Colombia) Monica Henao	MD	8	11 Mar 2022	Majestic Casino, Panama City, Panama	
27	Loss	19–8	(Argentina) Claudia Munoz	MD	6	11 Feb 2017	Centro Recreacional Yesterday, Turmero, Venezuela	
26	Win	19–7	(Colombia) Paulina Cardona	RTD	3 (8)	3 Dec 2016	Palacio Dorado, Panama City, Panama	
25	Loss	18–7	(Colombia) Liliana Palmera	UD	10	7 Aug 2015	Coliseo El Cangrejo, San Antero, Colombia	
24	Loss	18–6	(Jamaica) Alicia Ashley	UD	10	20 Apr 2013	Arena Roberto Duran, Panama City, Panama	For WBC female super-bantamweight title
23	Win	18–5	(Panama) Migdalia Asprilla	UD	10	1 Dec 2012	Gimnasio Los Naranjos, Boquete, Panama	
22	Win	17–5	(Argentina) Maria Andrea Miranda	KO	2 (10), 0:37	29 Sep 2012	Gimnasio Los Naranjos, Boquete, Panama	
21	Win	16–5	(Colombia) Calista Silgado	UD	8	16 Jun 2012	Gimnasio Los Naranjos, Boquete, Panama	
20	Loss	15–5	(Mexico) Jackie Nava	UD	10	28 Jan 2012	Auditorio Municipal, Tijuana, Mexico	For WBA female super-bantamweight title
19	Win	15–4	(Dominican Republic) Marilyn Hernandez	UD	10	8 Sep 2011	Arena Roberto Duran, Panama City, Panama	
18	Win	14–4	(Colombia) Paulina Cardona	TKO	8 (10), 1:11	2 Jul 2011	Feria de San Jose, David, Panama	
17	Win	13–4	(Trinidad and Tobago) Lisa Brown	UD	10	2 Apr 2011	Arena Roberto Duran, Panama City, Panama	
16	Win	12–4	(Colombia) Angela Marciales	TKO	6 (8), 1:13	10 Feb 2011	Atlapa Convention Centre, Panama City, Panama	
15	Win	11–4	(Venezuela) Ogleidis Suárez	TKO	5 (9), 1:45	2 Oct 2010	Arena Roberto Duran, Panama City, Panama	
14	Win	10–4	(Colombia) Paola Esther Herrera	TKO	1 (8)	14 Aug 2010	Arena Roberto Duran, Panama City, Panama	
13	Win	9–4	(Argentina) Maria Andrea Miranda	TKO	6 (8)	22 Apr 2010	Arena Roberto Duran, Panama City, Panama	
12	Loss	8–4	(Mexico) Jackie Nava	UD	10	30 Jan 2010	Restaurante Arroyo, Mexico City, Mexico	For interim WBC female super-bantamweight title
11	Win	8–3	(Venezuela) Ogleidis Suárez	SD	7	21 Jul 2009	Atlapa Convention Centre, Panama City, Panama	
10	Loss	7–3	(Mexico) Irma Sánchez	UD	10	6 Dec 2008	Palenque Calle 2, Zapopan, Mexico	
9	Win	7–2	(Argentina) Monica Acosta Siris	UD	6	18 Oct 2008	Gimnasio Pandeportes-La Basita, David, Panama	
8	Win	6–2	(Panama) Kathia Montuto	KO	3 (4), 1:29	30 Aug 2008	Gimnasio Pandeportes-La Basita, David, Panama	
7	Win	5–2	(Colombia) Olga Julio	UD	6	14 Jun 2008	La Candelaria, Panama	
6	Win	4–2	(Panama) Kathia Montuto	UD	4	27 Mar 2008	Atlapa Convention Centre, Panama City, Panama	
5	Win	3–2	(Panama) Kathia Montuto	UD	4	27 Oct 2007	Centro Recreativo del Educador, Penonome, Panama	
4	Win	2–2	(Panama) Kathia Montuto	UD	4	8 Sep 2007	Gimnasio del Club de Leones, El Maranon, Panama	
3	Win	1–2	(Panama) Juseth Arauz	UD	4	25 Apr 2007	Atlapa Convention Centre, Panama City, Panama	
2	Loss	0–2	(Venezuela) Carolina Alvarez	KO	1 (8), 1:28	29 Dec 2006	Gimnasio Municipal, Anton, Panama	
1	Loss	0–1	(Venezuela) Carolina Alvarez	UD	3	15 Jul 2006	Gimnasio Municipal, Anton, Panama	Professional debut
