= Ogleidis Suárez =

Venezuelan boxer (born 1987)

Personal information
- Nickname: La Niña (The Girl)
- Born: October 28, 1987 (age 38) Las Tejerias , Venezuela
- Weight: Super bantamweight; Featherweight; Super featherweight; Welterweight; Light middleweight

Boxing career
- Stance: Orthodox

Boxing record
- Total fights: 38
- Wins: 31
- Win by KO: 15
- Losses: 6
- Draws: 1

Ogleidis Suárez (born 28 October 1987) is a Venezuelan professional boxer. She held the WBA female featherweight title in 2013, having been promoted from interim champion, a title she held since 2011. Suárez was the WBA female interim super featherweight champion in 2014 and challenged for the IBF female light middleweight title in 2019. She also challenged for the WBA female super-welterweight title in 2025.

== Professional career ==
Suárez made her professional debut on 7 December 2006, scoring a second-round technical knockout (TKO) victory against Luz Darys Giraldo at the Centro de Convenciones Atlapa in Panama City.

After compiling a record of 5–0–1 (4 KOs), she defeated Magdalena Leija via seven-round unanimous decision (UD) on 18 September 2008, capturing the vacant WBA Fedelatin female super bantamweight title at the Centro de Convenciones Figali in Panama City. All three judges scored the bout 70–63. She lost the title three fights later, suffering the first defeat of her career against Chantal Martínez by way of split decision (SD) on 21 July 2009. One judge scored the bout 68–67 in favour of Suárez while the other two judges scored it 68½–68 and 68½–65¼ for Martínez. After four consecutive wins, Suárez faced Martínez for a second time on 2 October 2010, attempting to regain the WBA regional title in a bout which served as an eliminator for the WBA's world super bantamweight title. In the second defeat of her career, Suárez lost via fifth-round TKO.

She bounced back with three wins before defeating Katy Wilson Castillo via SD on 22 October 2010, capturing the vacant WBA female interim super bantamweight title at the Roberto Durán Arena in Panama City. Two judges scored the bout 96–94 in favour of Suárez while the third judge scored it 97–93 for Castillo. After two successful defences of her interim title in 2012, Suárez was elevated to full WBA champion in May 2013. The first defence of her title came against Liliana Palmera on 10 August 2013, at the Megapolis Convention Center in Panama City. Suárez retained her via UD, with two judges scoring the bout 99–91 while the third judge scored it 97–93. She lost the title in her next fight, suffering a UD defeat against Edith Soledad Matthysse on 13 December 2013, at the Teatro Griego Juan Pablo Segundo in San Martín, Argentina, with the judges' scorecards reading 100–90, 99–91 and 97–93.

Suárez moved up in weight for her next fight, defeating Calista Silgado via UD to capture the vacant WBA female interim super featherweight title on 10 May 2014, at the Polideportivo José María Vargas in La Guaira, Venezuela. Two judges scored the bout 99–91 and the third judge scored it 96–94.

After two years away from the ring following a pregnancy, Suárez returned on 18 June 2016, defeating Yarley Cuadrado via third-round knockout (KO) at the Polideportivo José María Vargas, capturing the vacant WBA female Fedelatin light middleweight title.

She won her next eight bouts before challenging for the IBF female light middleweight title against reigning champion Marie-Eve Dicaire. The bout took place on 23 November 2019, at the Videotron Centre in Quebec City, Canada. Suárez suffered the fourth defeat of her career, losing via UD with the judges' scorecards reading 100–90, 100–90 and 99–91.

Suárez challenged WBA female super-welterweight champion Mary Spencer at Montreal Casino in Canada on 10 April 2025, losing by unanimous decision.

== Professional boxing record ==
38 fights	31 wins	6 losses
By knockout	15	2
By decision	16	4
Draws	1	

No.	Result	Record	Opponent	Type	Round, time	Date	Location	Notes
38	Loss	31–6–1	(Canada) Mary Spencer	UD	10	10 Apr 2025	Montreal Casino, Montreal, Canada	For the WBA female super-welterweight title
37	Win	31–5–1	(Colombia) Neisi Torres	TKO	2 (6), 1:36	18 Jan 2025	Gimnasio Champs Boxing, Medellín, Colombia	
36	Loss	30–5–1	(United States) Shadasia Green	RTD	5 (8), 2:00	29 Oct 2022	(United States) Desert Diamond Arena, Glendale, Arizona, U.S.	
35	Win	30–4–1	(Venezuela) Maria Pirona	TKO	4 (6), 1:35	22 Feb 2020	Internado Judicial, Trujillo, Venezuela	
34	Loss	29–4–1	(Canada) Marie-Eve Dicaire	UD	10	23 Nov 2019	Videotron Centre, Quebec City, Quebec, Canada	For IBF female light middleweight title
33	Win	29–3–1	(Venezuela) Vanessa Colina	UD	6	14 Sep 2019	Gimnasio Vertical El Dorado, Caracas, Venezuela	
32	Win	28–3–1	(Venezuela) Maria Pirona	UD	10	9 Mar 2019	Internado Judicial, Trujillo, Venezuela	
31	Win	27–3–1	(Italy) Coromoto Torres	TKO	2 (6)	26 Jan 2019	Internado Judicial, Trujillo, Venezuela	
30	Win	26–3–1	(Venezuela) Yarine Rodriguez	TKO	1 (6)	15 Dec 2018	Internado Judicial, Trujillo, Venezuela	
29	Win	25–3–1	(Venezuela) Rosalinda Marquez	TKO	2 (6), 1:32	24 Nov 2018	Internado Judicial, Trujillo, Venezuela	
28	Win	24–3–1	(Venezuela) Maria Pirona	UD	8	10 Nov 2018	Internado Judicial, Trujillo, Venezuela	
27	Win	23–3–1	(Venezuela) Vanessa Colina	UD	8	3 Jun 2017	Centro Recreacional Yesterday, Turmero, Venezuela	
26	Win	22–3–1	(Colombia) Celia Rosa Sierra	KO	2 (10), 0:23	10 Dec 2016	Parque de las Aguas, Lima, Peru	Won vacant WBA Inter-Continental female welterweight title
25	Win	21–3–1	(Colombia) Yarley Cuadrado	KO	3 (10), 1:29	18 Jun 2016	Polideportivo José María Vargas, La Guaira, Venezuela	Won vacant WBA Fedelatin female light middleweight title
24	Win	20–3–1	(Colombia) Calista Silgado	UD	10	10 May 2014	Polideportivo José María Vargas, La Guaira, Venezuela	Won vacant WBA female interim super featherweight title
23	Loss	19–3–1	(Argentina) Edith Soledad Matthysse	UD	10	13 Dec 2013	Teatro Griego Juan Pablo Segundo, San Martín, Argentina	Lost WBA female featherweight title
22	Win	19–2–1	(Colombia) Liliana Palmera	UD	10	10 Aug 2013	Megapolis Convention Center, Panama City, Panama	Retained WBA female featherweight title
21	Win	18–2–1	(Colombia) Liliana Palmera	UD	7 (10), 0:23	27 Oct 2012	Parque Naciones Unidad, Caracas, Venezuela	Retained WBA female interim featherweight title
20	Win	17–2–1	(Argentina) Pamela Elisabeth Benavidez	UD	10	28 Apr 2012	Coliseo El Limon, Maracay, Venezuela	Retained WBA female interim featherweight title
19	Win	16–2–1	(Dominican Republic) Katy Wilson Castillo	SD	10	22 Oct 2011	Roberto Durán Arena, Panama City, Panama	Won vacant WBA female interim featherweight title
18	Win	15–2–1	(Colombia) Paola Rojas	UD	8	3 Jun 2011	Palacio Dorado, Panama City, Panama	
17	Win	14–2–1	(Colombia) Angela Marciales	TKO	4 (8), 1:10	15 Apr 2011	Palacio Dorado, Panama City, Panama	
16	Win	13–2–1	(Colombia) Paola Esther Herrera	TKO	1 (6), 0:36	18 Dec 2010	Hotel Melia Panama Canal, Colón, Panama	
15	Loss	12–2–1	(Panama) Chantal Martínez	TKO	5 (9), 1:45	2 Oct 2010	Roberto Durán Arena, Panama City, Panama	For vacant WBA Fedelatin female super bantamweight title
14	Win	12–1–1	(Colombia) Paola Rojas	UD	8	14 Aug 2010	Roberto Durán Arena, Panama City, Panama	
13	Win	11–1–1	(Colombia) Monica Acosta Siris	UD	6	2 Jul 2010	Centro de Convenciones COOPEVE, Santiago de Veraguas, Panama	
12	Win	10–1–1	(Colombia) Vanesa Medrano	TKO	1 (8), 1:50	27 Mar 2010	Polideportivo José María Vargas, La Guaira, Venezuela	
11	Win	9–1–1	(Colombia) Angela Marciales	UD	6	19 Nov 2009	La Macarena, Medellín, Colombia	
10	Loss	8–1–1	(Panama) Chantal Martínez	SD	7	21 Jul 2009	Centro de Convenciones Atlapa, Panama City, Panama	Lost WBA Fedelatin female super bantamweight title
9	Win	8–0–1	(Italy) Diana Ayala	UD	6	10 Jun 2009	Centro de Convenciones Atlapa, Panama City, Panama	
8	Win	7–0–1	(Colombia) Monica Acosta Siris	UD	6	28 Nov 2008	Centro de Convenciones Atlapa, Panama City, Panama	
7	Win	6–0–1	(Mexico) Magdalena Leija	UD	7	18 Sep 2008	Centro de Convenciones Figali, Panama City, Panama	Won vacant WBA Fedelatin female super bantamweight title
6	Win	5–0–1	(Colombia) Diana Ayala	UD	6	2 Jul 2008	Centro de Convenciones Atlapa, Panama City, Panama	
5	Win	4–0–1	(Colombia) Lorena Carrillo	TKO	3 (4), 1:18	1 Dec 2007	Roberto Durán Arena, Panama City, Panama	
4	Draw	3–0–1	(Colombia) Paulina Cardona	MD	4	2 Jun 2007	Roberto Durán Arena, Panama City, Panama	
3	Win	3–0	(Colombia) Olga Julio	TKO	1 (4), 1:09	25 Apr 2007	Centro de Convenciones Atlapa, Panama City, Panama	
2	Win	2–0	(Panama) Kathia Montuto	TKO	3 (4), 0:44	24 Mar 2007	Centro de Convenciones Figali, Panama City, Panama	
1	Win	1–0	(Colombia) Luz Darys Giraldo	TKO	2 (4), 0:27	7 Dec 2006	Centro de Convenciones Atlapa, Panama City, Panama	

Sporting positions
Regional boxing titles
N/A	WBA Fedelatin female super bantamweight champion 18 September 2008 – 21 July 2009	Succeeded by Chantal Martínez
Inaugural champion	WBA Fedelatin female light middleweight champion 18 June 2016 – December 2016	Vacant
N/A	WBA Inter-Continental female welterweight champion 10 December 2016	N/A
World boxing titles
Vacant Title last held by Claudia Andrea Lopez	WBA female featherweight champion Interim title 22 October 2011 – May 2013; Elevated to full champion	Vacant Title next held by Dahiana Santana
Vacant Title last held by Hyun Mi Choi	WBA female featherweight champion May 2013 – 13 December 2013	Succeeded by Edith Soledad Matthysse
