= George Foreman vs. Crawford Grimsley =

- Date: November 3, 1996
- Venue: Tokyo Bay NK Hall, Urayasu, Japan
- Title(s) on the line: WBU, Lineal and vacant IBA heavyweight titles

Tale of the tape
Boxer	George Foreman	Crawford Grimsley
Nickname	Big	The Terminator
Hometown	Houston, Texas, U.S.	Sunrise, Florida, U.S.
Purse	$3,000,000	$90,000
Pre-fight record	74–4 (68 KO)	20–0–2 (18 KO)
Age	47 years, 9 months	29 years, 1 month
Height	6 ft 4 in (193 cm)	6 ft 2 in (188 cm)
Weight	253 lb (115 kg)	235 lb (107 kg)
Style	Orthodox	Orthodox
Recognition	WBU and Lineal; Heavyweight Champion	WBA; No. 9 Ranked Heavyweight

Result
- Foreman wins via UD (119–109, 117–111, 116–112)

George Foreman vs. Crawford Grimsley was a professional boxing match contested on November 3, 1996, for the WBU, lineal and vacant IBA heavyweight titles.

== Background ==
Over a year-and-a-half prior, reigning IBF and lineal champion George Foreman had fought little known Axel Schulz, winning a close, and highly disputed, majority decision. The IBF ordered that Foreman once again face Schulz in a rematch, but Foreman refused and instead vacated the title in order to pursue a rematch with Michael Moorer, whom he had defeated in 1994 to win the IBF and WBA heavyweight titles, with Foreman claiming that the fight would be his last. The Foreman–Moorer rematch, originally scheduled for February 29, 1996 at Madison Square Garden, fell apart in January when both sides failed to agree to financial terms. After months without revealing his plans to fight again, Foreman finally announced that he would return to the ring to face fringe contender Crawford Grimsley, who was ranked number 9 among the WBA's contenders and was 20–0 as a professional, albeit against marginal competition, in Japan.

=== Morrison vs. Rhode ===
The featured bout on the undercard was Tommy Morrison taking on journeyman Marcus Rhode. Morrison was making his return to boxing after having been diagnosed with HIV nine months earlier in February only hours before he was set to face Arthur "Stormy" Weathers. Revealing his diagnosis in a press-conference shortly after, Morrison vowed that he "absolutely" would not box again, however, after consulting with doctors and being convinced that he could not spread the disease in the ring, he announced plans to return for one last fight in order to raise money for Knockout AIDS, the foundation he had created. On October 24, just a week before the Foreman–Grimsley event was to take place, Morrison announced that he would return to fight on the undercard, though with the added stipulation that the fight would be immediately stopped and go to the judge's scorecards should either fighter suffer a cut. The decision was not without its detractors, Morrison's longtime promoter Tony Holden expressed that he thought it was "too soon" for Morrison to fight, while fellow HIV-positive athlete, NBA star Magic Johnson, who had himself made a comeback the same year in spite of his diagnosis, disagreed with Morrison fighting again stating "After talking to my doctors, which is where I get my information from, I feel that he shouldn't be doing it because it's a blood sport." Morrison's original opponent, Anthony Cooks, was arrested and charged with the rape of a 15-year-old girl just days before the fight was to take place, so Marcus Rhode was chosen as a replacement. Morrison would earn the victory easily, knocking out Rhode only 98 seconds into the first round.

== The fight ==
The fight would go the full 12 rounds with Foreman ultimately earning the victory by unanimous decision with scores of 119–109, 117–111 and 116–112. Foreman kept Grimsley at bay with his left jab for much of the fight, though there were no knockdowns nor did either fighter land much sustained offense.

== Aftermath ==
Speaking after the bout, Foreman lauded Grimsley as a "good fighter" before lamenting the fact that Grimsley seemed to "run from me."

== Fight card ==
Confirmed bouts:

Weight Class	Weight		vs.		Method	Round	Notes
Heavyweight	200+ lbs.	George Foreman (c)	def	Crawford Grimsley	UD	12/12	^{Note 1}
Featherweight	126 lbs.	Orlando Canizales	def.	Sergio Reyes	TKO	10/12	^{Note 2}
Heavyweight	200+ lbs.	Tommy Morrison	def.	Marcus Rhode	TKO	1/10
Heavyweight	200+ lbs.	Craig Petersen	def.	Alex Stewart	TKO	8/10
Super Welterweight	154 lbs.	Valérie Hénin	def.	Mary Ann Almager	TKO	9/10
Heavyweight	200+ lbs.	Alonzo Highsmith	def.	Mark Gastineau	TKO	2/6

^Note 1 For WBU, IBA and lineal heavyweight titles
^Note 2 For IBA featherweight title

Preceded by vs. Axel Schulz	George Foreman's bouts 3 November 1996	Succeeded by vs. Lou Savarese
Preceded by vs. Eddie Curry	Crawford Grimsley's bouts 3 November 1996	Succeeded by vs. Jimmy Thunder
