= Jackie Chavez =

American boxer

Personal information
- Nationality: American
- Born: Jackie Chavez; June 1, 1983 (age 43) Albuquerque, New Mexico, USA
- Weight: Super bantamweight

Boxing career
- Stance: Orthodox

Boxing record
- Total fights: 13
- Wins: 9
- Win by KO: 3
- Losses: 4

Jackie Chavez (born June 1, 1983) is an American former professional boxer in the Super Bantamweight division. She was the IFBA world Super Bantamweight champion, and considered by many to be one of women's boxing's future stars. As far as is known, she has no relation with Mexican boxing legend Julio César Chávez.

== Pro career ==
Chavez began her professional boxing career on October 5, 2001, when, at the age of eighteen, she knocked out the more experienced Brandy Leon in three rounds at Acoma, New Mexico.

Her second fight came on December 14 of that year, and she beat Nicole Gallegos by a majority decision in four rounds, also at Acoma.

On March 23, 2002, she had her first fight outside the Acoma area, when she knocked out Evangelina Abeyta in the first round. This fight was held at Pojoaque, New Mexico.

Chavez kept her winning ways on her next fight when, on April 13, she fought Jodi Johnson on the Isleta Indian Reservation. She scored her second first round knockout in a row that night.

Jackie Chavez next made her Albuquerque, New Mexico debut, when she faced Raquelle Tebo on September 17. She outpointed Tebo, who had only one defeat before that fight, in four rounds.

Chavez had a forced lay-off from boxing after that fight, spending 2003 without fighting anyone. But, on February 21, 2004, she returned to the boxing ring, in Roswell, the town that is better known for the alleged spaceship crash of the 1950s. In Roswell, she beat LeAnne Villareal by a four round unanimous decision in a somewhat unusual scenario for a boxing fight: Roswell high school.

Already ranked among the top ten Super Bantamweights in women's boxing by the IFBA, Chavez next boxed Mercedes Mercury on April 10 in Albuquerque. She outpointed Mercury after six rounds, solidifying her ranking among the women fighters in the Super Bantamweight division.

On November 20, 2004, Chavez had her first world championship try, in what also marked her first fight outside of New Mexico. Fighting for the IFBA's vacant world Super Bantamweight title, she outpointed Jayla Ortiz over ten rounds in Ignacio, Colorado, to become a world champion boxer.

On June 12, 2005, Chavez retained her title by outpointing Audrey Vela by a split ten round decision in San Juan Pueblo, New Mexico. Then, Chavez fought her first fight abroad, fighting for the WIBA championship against Lisa Brown in Mucurapo, Trinidad and Tobago, losing by a ten round unanimous decision. She vacated the IFBA's version of the title before the fight with Brown.

On January 27, 2006, Chavez fought Jeri Sitzes for the NABF's women's Featherweight title, in Hollywood, California, losing by ten round unanimous decision. Chavez took one year off from boxing, she then faced Lisa Brown in a rematch, this time at Albuquerque, with the IFBA Super Bantamweight title on the line, but lost again, on March 22, 2007, by a unanimous ten round decision. Chavez's last fight to date was against Puerto Rican Ada Velez, another world champion boxer. This bout took place on September 21, 2007, and she lost a close, majority six round decision.

She thus left boxing with a 4 fight losing streak.

Chavez had 13 bouts, winning 9 and losing her last 4, with 3 wins by knockout.

== Professional boxing record ==
13 fights	9 wins	4 losses
By knockout	3	0
By decision	6	4

No.	Result	Record	Opponent	Type	Round, time	Date	Location	Notes
13	Loss	9–4	(Puerto Rico) Ada Velez	MD	6	21 Sep 2007	(United States) Santa Ana Star Casino, Bernalillo	
12	Loss	9–3	(Trinidad and Tobago) Lisa Brown	UD	10	22 Mar 2007	(United States) Isleta Casino & Resort, Albuquerque	
11	Loss	9–2	(United States) Jeri Sitzes	UD	10	27 Jan 2006	(United States) Hollywood Palladium, Hollywood	
10	Loss	9–1	(Trinidad and Tobago) Lisa Brown	UD	10	23 Sep 2005	(Trinidad and Tobago) Jean Pierre Sports Complex, Port of Spain	
9	Win	9–0	(United States) Audrey Vela	SD	10	12 Jun 2005	(United States) Ohkay Casino, San Juan Pueblo	Retained IFBA super bantamweight title
8	Win	8–0	(United States) Jayla Ortiz	UD	10	20 Nov 2004	(United States) Sky Ute Casino, Ignacio	Won vacant IFBA super bantamweight title
7	Win	7–0	(United States) Mercedes Mercury	SD	6	10 Apr 2004	(United States) Convention Center, Albuquerque	
6	Win	6–0	(United States) LeAnne Villareal	UD	4	21 Feb 2004	(United States) Roswell High School, Roswell	
5	Win	5–0	(United States) Raquelle Tebo	SD	4	17 Aug 2002	(United States) Santa Ana Star Casino, Albuquerque	
4	Win	4–0	(United States) Jodi Johnson	TKO	1 (4), 1:41	13 Apr 2002	(United States) Isleta Casino & Resort, Albuquerque	
3	Win	3–0	(United States) Evangelina Abeyta	KO	1 (4), 0:50	23 Mar 2002	(United States) Pojoaque, New Mexico	
2	Win	2–0	(United States) Nicole Gallegos	MD	4	14 Dec 2001	(United States) Sky City Casino, Acoma	
1	Win	1–0	(United States) Brandy Leon	TKO	3 (4), 0:29	5 Oct 2001	(United States) Sky City Casino, Acoma	Professional debut
