= Ada Vélez =

Puerto Rican boxer (born 1969)

Personal information
- Nickname: Ace
- Born: September 15, 1969 (age 56) Puerto Rico
- Height: 5 ft 3 in (160 cm)
- Weight: Bantamweight; Super bantamweight; Featherweight

Boxing career
- Reach: 62 in (157 cm)
- Stance: Southpaw

Boxing record
- Total fights: 28
- Wins: 20
- Win by KO: 6
- Losses: 5
- Draws: 3

Ada "Ace" Vélez (born September 15, 1969) is a Puerto Rican female professional boxer from Dania Beach, Florida who lives in Miami. Vélez was brought into boxing by former women's boxing world champion Bonnie Canino.

== Career ==
After a successful undefeated amateur career that included a national title, Vélez became the first native Puerto Rican to win a women's world boxing championship on January 19, 2001, when she defeated Kathy Williams on a unanimous decision over 10 rounds to win the IBA bantamweight title. Ten months later, she moved up in weight and challenged undefeated Mary Elizabeth Ortega for the WIBA super bantamweight title, again winning a 10-round unanimous decision.

Vélez won her first 10 pro fights before suffering her first loss as a professional, in her first defense of the WIBA title. On June 21, 2002, Melissa Del Valle decisioned Vélez in Waco, Texas in the featured bout on an all-women's card featuring world champions Ann Wolfe, Sumya Anani, Delia Gonzalez and Kelsey Jeffries.

On December 21, she bounced back to reclaim the IBA version of the world bantamweight title by decisioning Lakeysha Williams over 10 rounds.

Vélez has added the WIBA bantamweight title to her IBA belt on June 28, 2003, when she beat Gonzalez on a seventh-round disqualification.

Vélez traveled to Denmark to defend her WIBA bantamweight title against Anita Christensen. on January 17, 2004, Vélez lost a highly controversial 10 round split decision to Christensen. Vélez had knocked down Christensen in the 9th round, and looked to be the obvious winner of their encounter. The Danish press strongly criticized this decision, saying on record that Vélez was robbed of her title.

She fought Melinda Cooper for the vacant IBF super-bantamweight title at the National Stadium in San José, Costa Rica, on 31 March 2011, winning by split decision with two of the ringside judges scoring the contest 96-94 in her favour while the third had it for her opponent by the same tally. A rematch on 20 November 2011 saw Vélez retain her title by majority decision. One judge scored the fight a 95-95 draw but was overruled by the other two who scored it in her favour 98-92 and 97-93 respectively.

She now teaches kids, teens, and adults boxing at Velez Boxing and Fitness in Oakland Park, Florida. She makes them do exercise machines, running, strength and conditioning, and boxing.

Vélez was inducted into the International Women's Boxing Hall of Fame in 2017.

== Professional boxing record ==
28 fights	20 wins	5 losses
By knockout	6	0
By decision	12	5
By disqualification	2	0
Draws	3	

No.	Result	Record	Opponent	Type	Round, time	Date	Location	Notes
28	Loss	20–5–3	Jessica Rakoczy	UD	10	24 Jan 2013	Coca-Cola Center, Oklahoma City, Oklahoma, U.S.	For vacant WIBA super-bantamweight title
27	Loss	20–4–3	Katy Wilson Castillo	UD	10	24 Mar 2012	Palacio de Deportes, Santo Domingo, Dominican Republic	Lost IBF super-bantamweight title
26	Win	20–3–3	Melinda Cooper	MD	10	20 Nov 2011	Texas Station, North Las Vegas, Nevada, U.S.	Retained IBF super-bantamweight title
25	Win	19–3–3	Melinda Cooper	SD	10	31 Mar 2011	National Stadium, San José, Costa Rica	Won vacant IBF super-bantamweight title
24	Win	18–3–3	Mary Ortega	UD	6	10 Dec 2010	Memorial Hall, Kansas City, Kansas, U.S.	
23	Win	17–3–3	Stacey Reile	UD	8	27 Feb 2010	Electricians Union Hall, Miami, Florida, U.S.	
22	Draw	16–3–3	Kaliesha West	MD	6	21 Jan 2010	San Manuel Indian Casino, Highland, California, U.S.	
21	Win	16–3–2	Kasha Chamblin	UD	10	24 Nov 2007	Paragon Casino & Resort, Marksville, Louisiana, U.S.	Won vacant IBA super-bantamweight title
20	Win	15–3–2	Jackie Chavez	MD	6	21 Sep 2007	Santa Ana Star Casino Hotel, Bernalillo, New Mexico, U.S.	
19	Loss	14–3–2	Jeri Sitzes	UD	6	10 Aug 2007	Expo Center, Springfield, Missouri, U.S.	
18	Loss	14–2–2	Anita Christensen	SD	10	17 Jan 2004	SAS Radisson, Aarhus, Denmark	Lost WIBA bantamweight title; For vacant WIBF bantamweight title
17	Draw	14–1–2	Lisa Brown	PTS	10	30 Oct 2003	Seminole Casino, Coconut Creek, Florida, U.S.	Retained WIBA bantamweight title
16	Win	14–1–1	Delia Gonzalez	DQ	7 (10), 1:25	28 Jun 2003	Seminole Casino, Coconut Creek, Florida, U.S.	Retained WIBA bantamweight title
15	Win	13–1–1	Leona Brown	DQ	7 (8), 1:18	29 Mar 2003	Seminole Casino, Coconut Creek, Florida, U.S.	
14	Win	12–1–1	Lakeysha Williams	UD	10	20 Dec 2002	American Airlines Arena, Miami, Florida, U.S.	Won vacant WIBA bantamweight title
13	Win	11–1–1	Rolanda Andrews	TKO	4 (6), 1:41	9 Nov 2002	South Florida Fairgrounds, West Palm Beach, Florida, U.S.	
12	Draw	10–1–1	Layla McCarter	MD	6	18 Jul 2002	Rose Garden, Portland, Oregon, U.S.	For vacant vacant USA Oregon State featherweight title
11	Loss	10–1	Melissa Del Valle	UD	10	21 Jun 2002	Convention Center, Waco, Texas, U.S.	Lost WIBA super-bantamweight title
10	Win	10–0	Angie Bordelon	TKO	2 (6), 1:54	25 Jan 2002	Young Pavilion, Pembroke Pines, Florida, U.S.	
9	Win	9–0	Mary Ortega	UD	10	16 Nov 2001	Convention Center, Austin, Texas, U.S.	Won vacant WIBA super-bantamweight title
8	Win	8–0	Jamillia Lawrence	MD	4	29 Jun 2001	Dover Downs, Dover, Delaware, U.S.	
7	Win	7–0	Kathy Williams	UD	10	19 Jan 2001	Soaring Eagle Casino, Mount Pleasant, Michigan, U.S.	Won vacant IBA bantamweight title
6	Win	6–0	Linda Tenberg	UD	8	15 Dec 2000	Memorial Auditorium, Fort Lauderdale, Florida, U.S.	
5	Win	5–0	Lisa Foster	TKO	2 (4), 1:48	15 Nov 2000	Dundee Training Center, Davie, Florida, U.S.	
4	Win	4–0	Pamela Opdyke	TKO	3 (6), 1:45	18 Oct 2000	Dundee Training Center, Davie, Florida, U.S.	
3	Win	3–0	Jamie Chartrand	TKO	2 (4), 1:59	8 Oct 2000	Grand Victoria Casino, Elgin, Illinois, U.S.	
2	Win	2–0	Sue Chase	UD	4	30 Jun 2000	Grand Casino, Tunica Resorts, Mississippi, U.S.	
1	Win	1–0	Jocelyn Fontanilla	TKO	3 (4), 1:21	21 Aug 1999	National Guard Armory, West Palm Beach, Florida, U.S.	

== See also ==
- List of female boxers
- List of southpaw stance boxers
- List of Puerto Ricans
- Boxing in Puerto Rico
- List of Puerto Rican boxing world champions
- International Women's Boxing Hall of Fame
- History of women in Puerto Rico

Sporting positions
Minor world boxing titles
Vacant Title last held by Theresa Arnold	IBA bantamweight champion January 19, 2001 – 2003; Vacated	Vacant Title next held by Monica Lovato
New title	WIBA super-bantamweight champion November 16, 2001 – June 21, 2002	Succeeded by Melissa Del Valle
New title	WIBA bantamweight champion December 20, 2002 – January 17, 2004	Succeeded by Anita Christensen
New title	IBA super-bantamweight champion November 24, 2007 – 2008; Vacated	Vacant Title next held by Ana Julaton
Major world boxing titles
Inaugural champion	IBF super-bantamweight champion March 31, 2011 – March 24, 2012	Succeeded by Katy Wilson Castillo
