= Destiny Day-Owens =

American boxer

Personal information
- Nickname: Lady Tyson
- Nationality: (United States) American
- Born: Destiny Day-Owens; February 15, 1995 (age 31) Baltimore, Maryland, U.S.
- Height: 5 ft 6 in (168cm)
- Weight: Welterweight

Boxing career
- Stance: Orthodox

Boxing record
- Total fights: 14
- Wins: 14
- Win by KO: 9
- Losses: 0
- Draws: 0

Destiny Day-Owens (born February 15, 1995) is an American professional boxer, entrepreneur, gym owner, and youth boxing advocate. Known professionally as “Lady Tyson,” she is the first female world boxing champion from Baltimore, Maryland. Day-Owens is an undefeated two-division world champion, having captured world titles in two different weight classes. She also holds a secondary championship sanctioned by the Universal Boxing Federation (UBF), bringing her total to three professional boxing titles.

Beyond her professional boxing career, Day-Owens is dedicated to youth development through boxing. As a gym owner and entrepreneur, she works to provide young athletes with opportunities for mentorship, discipline, personal growth, and athletic development.

== Early life and education ==
Destiny Day-Owens was born on February 15, 1995, in Baltimore, Maryland, United States.

She was raised in the Park Heights neighborhood of Northwest Baltimore City. Her educational background includes attending Edgecombe Circle Elementary School, William H. Lemmel Middle School, and Frederick Douglass High School.

== Amateur boxing career ==
Destiny Day-Owens started boxing at 19 years old. She came under the guidance of Baltimore boxing coach Mack Allison at his Time 2 Grind Boxing gym.

She was a Golden Gloves champion in 2015, 2016, and 2018.

== Professional career ==
At 23, the three-time Golden Gloves champion made her professional boxing debut in Waldorf, Maryland, on January 26, 2019. She won the fight against Michaele Nogue by split decision.

She first met Katerin Tobon of Columbia in December 2022, stopping her in the first round.

Day-Owens claimed her first world title on September 22, 2023, winning the Women's International Boxing Association (WIBA) light middleweight championship against Paulina Cardona in Columbia. The Cardona win established her as Baltimore's first female world champion.

On May 17, 2025, she defeated Colombia's Katerin Tobon in a rematch for the vacant Universal Boxing Federation (UBF) welterweight world title at the Coliseo de Pescaito in Santa Marta.

According to BoxRec, she is currently undefeated and ranked number four among the women's welterweights in the United States. As of December 15, 2025, she holds the number three ranking at 147 pounds in the WBO female world ratings.

== Professional boxing record ==
14 fights	14 wins	0 losses
By knockout	9	0
By decision	5	0
Draws	0	
