= Kaliesha West =

American boxer (born 1988)

Personal information
- Nickname: Wild Wild
- Born: Kaliesha West-Hoke; February 11, 1988 (age 38) South Haven, Michigan, U.S.
- Height: 5 ft 4 in (163 cm)
- Weight: Bantamweight; Super bantamweight

Boxing career
- Stance: Orthodox

Boxing record
- Total fights: 22
- Wins: 17
- Win by KO: 4
- Losses: 2
- Draws: 3

Kaliesha West (born February 11, 1988) is an American former professional boxer who held the WBO female bantamweight and International Female Boxers Association super-bantamweight World titles during her career.

== Biography ==
West has a multi-cultural heritage. Her father, Juan, is of Nigerian, Cantù, Irish, and Seminole Indian descent while her mother, Melissa, is of Mexican, French, Spanish, and Native American heritage. She was first introduced to boxing while attending her father's matches. Despite initial reluctance to involve her in the sport, Juan eventually taught her the basics and then took her to a boxing gym.

As an amateur, West had over 100 fights and won numerous tournaments and honors including the 2002-2003 Junior Olympic championships, 2003-2004 Silver Gloves and the 2002 125lb National Golden Gloves championship for ages 13–14.

Shortly after her 18th birthday, West made her professional boxing debut on February 23, 2006, at San Manuel Indian Casino in San Bernardino, California, recording a four-round unanimous decision win over Suzannah Warner. Women were now allowed to box in the Olympics during this time, and this became the deciding factor to why West turned professional.

On September 18, 2010, at the Staples Center in Los Angeles, California, West won the vacant WBO female bantamweight World title with a seventh-round technical knockout victory against Angel Gladney. She made boxing history, as she became the first boxing champion from the Inland Empire region in Southern California. West successfully defended her title against Ava Knight (split decision draw) on 18 June 2011, Jessica Villafranca (unanimous decision win) on 20 August 2011 and Claudia Andrea Lopez (majority decision win) on 14 April 2012.

On October 6, 2012, at the Finish Line Sports Grill in Pomona, California, West won the vacant International Female Boxers Association World super-bantamweight title with a unanimous decision success over Christina Ruiz.

West retired from professional boxing in 2017 and was inducted into the International Women's Boxing Hall of Fame in 2023.

== Professional boxing record ==
22 fights	17 wins	2 losses
By knockout	4	0
By decision	13	2
Draws	3	

No.	Result	Record	Opponent	Type	Round, time	Date	Location	Notes
22	Win	17–2–3	Kirstie Simmons	UD	6	2017-09-23	Agua Caliente Casino Resort Spa, Rancho Mirage, California, U.S.	
21	Loss	16–2–3	Olivia Gerula	UD	8	2014-08-15	Crowne Plaza Hotel, Gatineau, Quebec, Canada	
20	Win	16–1–3	Christina Ruiz	UD	10	2012-10-06	Finish Line Sports Grill, Pomona, California, U.S.	Won vacant IFBA super-bantamweight title
19	Win	15–1–3	Claudia Andrea Lopez	MD	10	2012-04-14	Auditorio Ernesto Rufo, Rosarito, Mexico	Retained WBO bantamweight title
18	Win	14–1–3	Jessica Villafranca	UD	10	2011-08-20	Casino Black Pyramid, Manzanillo, Mexico	Retained WBO bantamweight title
17	Draw	13–1–3	Ava Knight	SD	10	2011-06-18	Sports Arena, Pico Rivera, California, U.S.	Retained WBO bantamweight title
16	Win	13–1–2	Angel Gladney	KO	7 (10)	2010-09-18	Staples Center, Los Angeles, California, U.S.	Won inaugural WBO bantamweight title
15	Win	12–1–2	Vannessa Guimaraes	TKO	5 (8)	2010-06-26	Jockey Club del Perú, Lima, Peru	
14	Draw	11–1–2	Anita Christensen	MD	10	2010-03-26	Arena Midt, Kjellerup, Denmark	
13	Draw	11–1–1	Ada Vélez	MD	6	2010-01-21	San Manuel Indian Casino, San Bernardino, California, U.S.	
12	Win	11–1	Rolanda Andrews	UD	6	2009-08-01	Agua Caliente Casino Resort Spa, Rancho Mirage, California, U.S.	
11	Loss	10–1	Ava Knight	UD	8	2008-11-18	Table Mountain Casino, Friant, California, U.S.	
10	Win	10–0	Elizabeth Cervantes	KO	1 (6)	2008-07-23	Morongo Casino Resort & Spa, Cabazon, California, U.S.	
9	Win	9–0	Elizabeth Moreno	UD	6	2008-06-27	Morongo Casino Resort & Spa, Cabazon, California, U.S.	
8	Win	8–0	Flor Verdugo	TKO	2 (6)	2008-03-29	Gimnasio Oscar 'Tigre' García, Ensenada, Mexico	
7	Win	7–0	Carly Batey	SD	6	2007-08-17	Harrah's Resort Southern California, Valley Center, California, U.S.	
6	Win	6–0	Elizabeth Cervantes	UD	4	2007-03-30	Pechanga Resort Casino, Temecula, California, U.S.	
5	Win	5–0	Stella Nijhof	UD	6	2006-11-18	Conference Center, Monterey, California, U.S.	
4	Win	4–0	Maria Contreras	UD	6	2006-07-08	Conference Center, Monterey, California, U.S.	
3	Win	3–0	Elizabeth Cervantes	UD	4	2006-05-19	Quiet Cannon, Montebello, California, U.S.	
2	Win	2–0	Tonia Cravens	UD	4	2006-03-25	Fantasy Springs Resort Casino, Indio, California, U.S.	
1	Win	1–0	Suzannah Warner	UD	4	2006-02-23	San Manuel Indian Casino, San Bernardino, California, U.S.	

== See also ==
- List of female boxers
- International Women's Boxing Hall of Fame

Sporting positions
Minor world boxing titles
Vacant Title last held by Lisa Brown	IFBA super-bantamweight champion October 6, 2012 – 2013; Vacated	Vacant Title next held by Maureen Shea
Major world boxing titles
Inaugural champion	WBO bantamweight champion September 18, 2010 – 2013; Vacated	Vacant Title next held by Daniela Romina Bermúdez
