= Crawford Grimsley =

Professional heavyweight boxer and kickboxer

Personal information
- Nickname: The Terminator
- Nationality: American
- Born: October 1, 1967 (age 58)
- Height: 6 ft 2 in (1.88 m)
- Weight: Heavyweight

Boxing career
- Reach: 77 in (196 cm)
- Stance: Orthodox

Boxing record
- Total fights: 27
- Wins: 22
- Win by KO: 20
- Losses: 4
- Draws: 1

Crawford Grimsley (born October 1, 1967) is a retired professional heavyweight boxer and kickboxer, who fought several significant fighters of his era. He challenged once for the lineal, WBU and vacant IBA heavyweight titles in 1996, and once for the IBO heavyweight title in 1997.

== Professional career ==
He made his professional debut in 1994, stopping Steve Paolilli in the first round. By 1996, he was ranked #9 in the WBA rankings, and #12 in the WBO rankings. His most notable match was against Jimmy Thunder. In 1.5 seconds, Thunder delivered a right hook to the head and Grimsley hit the mat and the match ended. This match serves as the fastest boxing match in history. Before the fight, Grimsley had a 20–1 record with 18 wins by KO and his sole loss being a twelve-round decision to George Foreman four months prior. After his record breaking fight against Jimmy Thunder his career took a bit of a downturn going 2–2–1 in his next 5 fights before retiring in 2002.

== Personal life ==
After his boxing career he founded ProWebCast, one of the first webcasting companies, in the 1990s before entering the cannabis industry and becoming CEO of Cannabis Consulting Group Inc.

== Professional boxing record ==
22 Wins (20 knockouts, 2 decisions), 4 Losses (3 knockouts, 1 decision), 1 Draw
Result	Record	Opponent	Type	Round	Date	Location	Notes
Loss	22–4–1	(Guyana) Andre Purlette	TKO	3 (4)	07/09/2002	Kongresovy Sal, Prague, Czech Republic	For WBC Latino heavyweight title
Draw	22–3–1	(United States) Nick Nurse	TD	3 (6)	05/10/2001	Level Nightclub, Miami Beach, Florida, United States	
Win	22–3	(United States) Tommy Mucciogrosso	TKO	2 (6)	10/07/1998	(United States) Memorial Auditorium, Fort Lauderdale, Florida, US	
Win	21–3	(United States) Isaac Poole	TKO	2 (?)	06/12/1997	Oranjestad, Aruba	
Loss	20–3	(Denmark) Brian Nielsen	TKO	6 (8)	03/10/1997	Ostre Gasvaerk, Copenhagen, Denmark	
Loss	20–2	(New Zealand) Jimmy Thunder	KO	1 (10)	18/03/1997	IMA Center, Flint, Michigan, United States	
Loss	20–1	(United States) George Foreman	UD	12	03/11/1996	Tokyo Bay NK Hall, Urayasu, Chiba, Japan	For Lineal, WBU and vacant IBA heavyweight titles
Win	20–0	(United States) Eddie Curry	TKO	1 (10)	23/03/1996	Miami Arena, Miami, Florida, United States	
Win	19–0	(United States) Carlton West	KO	1 (?)	20/01/1996	Miami, Florida, United States	
Win	18–0	(United States) Ron McGowan	TKO	6 (8)	02/12/1995	Miami, Florida, United States	
Win	17–0	(United States) John Morton	TKO	2 (12)	15/11/1995	Condado, Puerto Rico	Retained WBC FECARBOX heavyweight title
Win	16–0	(United States) Max Key	TKO	1 (?)	04/10/1995	Condado, Puerto Rico	
Win	15–0	(Mexico) Ladislao Mijangos	KO	1 (12)	18/09/1995	Condado, Venezuela	Won vacant WBA Fedelatin heavyweight title
Win	14–0	(United States) Chris Cole	TKO	1 (10)	29/07/1995	Miami, Florida, United States	
Win	13–0	(United States) Mike Faulkner	KO	1 (10)	08/07/1995	Miami, Florida, United States	
Win	12–0	(United States) Charles Hostetter	KO	1 (8)	15/04/1995	Miami, Florida, United States	
Win	11–0	(United States) Charles Hostetter	PTS	8	11/02/1995	Miami, Florida, United States	
Win	10–0	(Dominican Republic) Perfecto Gonzalez	KO	3 (12)	25/11/1994	Santo Domingo, Dominican Republic	Won WBC FECARBOX heavyweight title
Win	9–0	(United States) Ron Gullette	PTS	6	22/10/1994	Miami, Florida, United States	
Win	8–0	(United States) Charles Dixon	KO	3 (?)	23/09/1994	Maracay, Venezuela	
Win	7–0	(United States) Alvin Dominey	KO	1 (6)	10/09/1994	Miami, Florida, United States	
Win	6–0	(United States) Isaac Poole	KO	1 (?)	27/08/1994	Miami Beach, Florida, United States	
Win	5–0	(United States) Ed Irving	KO	1 (4)	13/08/1994	Miami, Florida, United States	
Win	4–0	Akili Muhammad	KO	1 (4)	11/06/1994	Miami, Florida, United States	
Win	3–0	(United States) Tom Bersaw	KO	1 (4)	14/05/1994	Miami, Florida, United States	
Win	2–0	(United States) Juan Guerra	TKO	1 (4)	02/04/1994	Miami, Florida, United States	
Win	1–0	(United States) Steve Paolilli	TKO	1 (4)	05/02/1994	Miami, Florida, United States	
