= Jackie Nava =

Mexican boxer (born 1980)

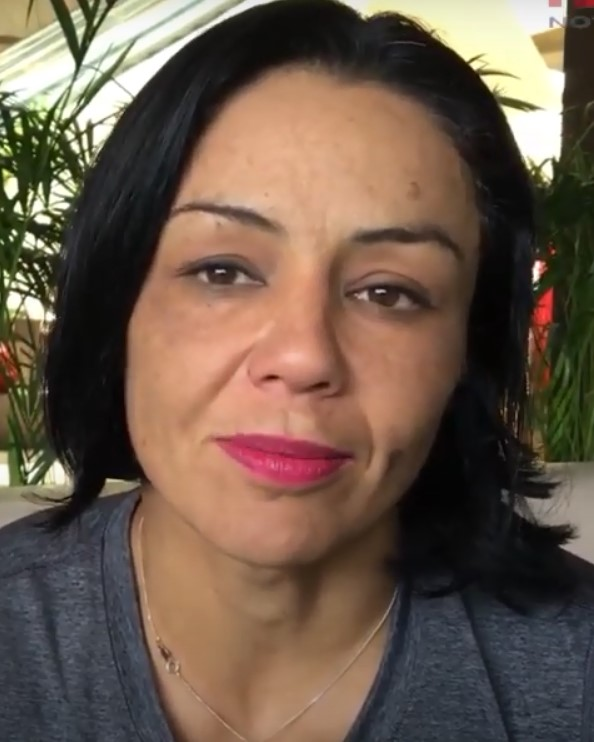
- Nava in 2018

Personal information
- Nicknames: La Princesa Azteca ("The Aztec Princess")
- Born: Jacqueline Nava Mouett; April 11, 1980 (age 46) Tijuana, Mexico
- Height: 5 ft 3 in (160 cm)
- Weight: Bantamweight; Super bantamweight

Boxing career
- Stance: Orthodox

Boxing record
- Total fights: 48
- Wins: 40
- Win by KO: 16
- Losses: 4
- Draws: 4

Jacqueline Nava Mouett (Spanish pronunciation: [ˈɟ͡ʝaki ˈnaβa]; born 11 April 1980) is a Mexican professional boxer. She is a former world champion in two weight classes, having held the WBA female bantamweight title in 2005; the WBC female super bantamweight title twice between 2005 and 2015; and the WBA super bantamweight title twice between 2012 and 2015. Nava is a member of the International Women's Boxing Hall of Fame. In 2015, voters in the eighth federal electoral district of Baja California elected Nava to the Chamber of Deputies for the 63rd session of Congress.

== Professional boxing career ==
In April 2004, she won the Mexican National super bantamweight title by knocking out Ofelia Dominguez.

=== WBA bantamweight champion ===
She won her first world championship, the WBA female bantamweight title by beating Martha Leticia Arevalo in Tijuana, Baja California, Mexico.

=== WBC super bantamweight champion ===
On May 5, 2005, she moved up in weight to capture her second world title, defeating Leona Brown to win the inaugural WBC female super bantamweight title.

=== Interim title ===
In 2007 she beat Donna Biggers and won the WBC interim female super bantamweight title. She defeated Maria Andrea Miranda to retain her title.

=== Post-retirement ===
Nava was inducted into the International Women's Boxing Hall of Fame in 2025.

== Legislative career ==
In June 2015, voters elected Nava, running as the candidate of the National Action Party (PAN), to the Chamber of Deputies to represent Baja California's 8th district during the 63rd session of Congress. She served on the Sports, Children's Rights, and Youth Committees.

== Personal ==
Nava has a daughter, Frida Mendoza Nava.

In 2003, Nava obtained an undergraduate degree in architecture from the Tijuana Institute of Technology.

== Professional boxing record ==
| 48 fights | 40 wins | 4 losses |
|---|---|---|
| By knockout | 16 | 1 |
| By decision | 24 | 3 |
| Draws | 4 | |

| No. | Result | Record | Opponent | Type | Round, time | Date | Location | Notes |
|---|---|---|---|---|---|---|---|---|
| 48 | Win | 40–4–4 | Gloria Elena Yancaqueo | UD | 10 | Oct 1, 2022 | Auditorio Fausto Gutierrez Moreno, Tijuana, Mexico | |
| 47 | Win | 39–4–4 | Mariana Juárez | UD | 10 | Oct 30, 2021 | Auditorio Fausto Gutierrez Moreno, Tijuana, Mexico | |
| 46 | Win | 38–4–4 | Karina Fernandez | UD | 10 | Mar 20, 2021 | Grand Hotel, Tijuana, Mexico | |
| 45 | Win | 37–4–4 | Marisol Corona | UD | 10 | Nov 21, 2020 | Gimnasio TV Azteca, Mexico City, Mexico | |
| 44 | Win | 36–4–4 | Estrella Valverde | UD | 10 | Jul 3, 2020 | Gimnasio TV Azteca, Mexico City, Mexico | |
| 43 | Draw | 35–4–4 | Marcela Acuña | MD | 10 | May 25, 2019 | Estadio de Beisbol Agustin Flores Contreras, Puerto Vallarta, Mexico | |
| 42 | Win | 35–4–3 | Carolina Alvarez | RTD | 7 (10), 2:00 | Nov 10, 2018 | Auditorio Fausto Gutierrez Moreno, Tijuana, Mexico | |
| 41 | Win | 34–4–3 | Alys Sánchez | RTD | 7 (10), 2:00 | Aug 11, 2018 | Mexico City Arena, Mexico City, Mexico | |
| 40 | Win | 33–4–3 | Ana Maria Lozano | UD | 10 | Feb 4, 2017 | Auditorio Pablo Colin, Cuautitlán Izcalli, Mexico | Won vacant WBC International super-bantamweight title |
| 39 | Win | 32–4–3 | Mayra Alejandra Gomez | TKO | 6 (10), 1:22 | Feb 28, 2015 | Centro De Convenciones, Rosarito, Mexico | Retained WBC super-bantamweight title |
| 38 | Win | 31–4–3 | Sayda Mosquera | UD | 10 | Dec 6, 2014 | Centro de Usos Multiples, Hermosillo, Mexico | Retained WBC super-bantamweight title |
| 37 | Win | 30–4–3 | Alicia Ashley | MD | 10 | Sep 6, 2014 | Mexico City Arena, Mexico City, Mexico | Won WBC super-bantamweight title |
| 36 | Win | 29–4–3 | Alys Sánchez | KO | 7 (10), 0:46 | May 24, 2014 | Auditorio Fausto Gutierrez Moreno, Tijuana, Mexico | |
| 35 | Win | 28–4–3 | Lisa Brown | TKO | 3 (10), 1:42 | Aug 18, 2012 | La Cetto Vineyard, Valle de Guadalupe, Mexico | |
| 34 | Win | 27–4–3 | Diana Ayala | UD | 10 | May 5, 2012 | Auditorio Fausto Gutierrez Moreno, Tijuana, Mexico | |
| 33 | Win | 26–4–3 | Chantal Martínez | UD | 10 | Jan 28, 2012 | Auditorio Fausto Gutierrez Moreno, Tijuana, Mexico | |
| 32 | Win | 25–4–3 | Edith Soledad Matthysse | UD | 10 | Oct 8, 2011 | Auditorio Fausto Gutierrez Moreno, Tijuana, Mexico | |
| 31 | Loss | 24–4–3 | Ana María Torres | UD | 10 | Jul 30, 2011 | Arena Jorge Cuesy Serrano, Tuxtla Gutiérrez, Mexico | |
| 30 | Draw | 24–3–3 | Ana María Torres | UD | 10 | Apr 16, 2011 | World Trade Center, Boca del Río, Mexico | |
| 29 | Win | 24–3–2 | Fredee Gonzalez | UD | 10 | Jan 29, 2011 | Estadio Banorte, Culiacán, Mexico | Retained Interim WBC super-bantamweight title |
| 28 | Win | 23–3–2 | Jennifer Salinas | UD | 10 | Nov 6, 2010 | Poliforum Zamna, Mérida, Mexico | Retained Interim WBC super-bantamweight title |
| 27 | Win | 22–3–2 | Maria Andrea Miranda | TKO | 4 (10), 1:31 | Aug 21, 2010 | Auditorio Fausto Gutierrez Moreno, Tijuana, Mexico | Retained Interim WBC super-bantamweight title |
| 26 | Win | 21–3–2 | Chantal Martínez | UD | 10 | Jan 30, 2010 | Restaurante Arroyo, Mexico City, Mexico | Won Interim WBC super-bantamweight title |
| 25 | Win | 20–3–2 | Lina Ramirez | UD | 8 | Oct 17, 2009 | El Foro, Tijuana, Mexico | |
| 24 | Loss | 19–3–2 | Marcela Acuña | UD | 10 | Apr 30, 2009 | Estadio Luna Park, Buenos Aires, Argentina | For WBC super-bantamweight title |
| 23 | Win | 19–2–2 | Maria del Carmen Potenza | UD | 10 | Nov 2, 2008 | Feria Nacional de San Marcos, Aguascalientes, Mexico | Retained Interim WBC super-bantamweight title |
| 22 | Win | 18–2–2 | Betina Gabriela Garino | TKO | 8 (10), 0:33 | Sep 15, 2008 | Arena México, Mexico City, Mexico | |
| 21 | Win | 17–2–2 | Yazmín Rivas | UD | 10 | May 17, 2008 | Plaza Monumental, Aguascalientes, Mexico | Retained Interim WBC super-bantamweight title |
| 20 | Win | 16–2–2 | Lina Ramirez | UD | 10 | Nov 24, 2007 | Estadio Beto Avila, Veracruz, Mexico | |
| 19 | Win | 15–2–2 | Donna Biggers | UD | 10 | Sep 16, 2007 | The Joint, Paradise, Nevada, U.S. | Won Interim WBC super-bantamweight title |
| 18 | Draw | 14–2–2 | Alejandra Oliveras | MD | 10 | Mar 2, 2007 | Orfeo Superdomo, Córdoba, Argentina | For WBC super-bantamweight title |
| 17 | Win | 14–2–1 | Elizabeth Ruiz | KO | 5 (6), 1:55 | Jan 29, 2007 | Caliente Hipódromo, Tijuana, Mexico | |
| 16 | Loss | 13–2–1 | Alejandra Oliveras | KO | 8 (10), 1:47 | May 20, 2006 | Caliente Hipódromo, Tijuana, Mexico | Lost WBC super-bantamweight title |
| 15 | Win | 13–1–1 | Kelsey Jeffries | UD | 10 | Jan 28, 2006 | Plaza de Toros, Cancún, Mexico | Retained WBC super-bantamweight title |
| 14 | Win | 12–1–1 | Elizabeth Ruiz | KO | 5 (8) | Dec 2, 2005 | Estadio de Beisbol Arturo C. Nahl, La Paz, Mexico | |
| 13 | Win | 11–1–1 | Susana Vazquez | UD | 10 | Oct 17, 2005 | Auditorio Fausto Gutierrez Moreno, Tijuana, Mexico | Retained WBC super-bantamweight title |
| 12 | Win | 10–1–1 | Leona Brown | UD | 10 | May 30, 2005 | Grand Hotel, Tijuana, Mexico | Won inaugural WBC super-bantamweight title |
| 11 | Win | 9–1–1 | Martha Leticia Arevalo | TKO | 7 (10), 0:59 | Feb 28, 2005 | Caliente Hipódromo, Tijuana, Mexico | Won inaugural WBA bantamweight title |
| 10 | Draw | 8–1–1 | Ivonne Munoz | SD | 10 | Jul 26, 2004 | Auditorio Fausto Gutierrez Moreno, Tijuana, Mexico | |
| 9 | Win | 8–1 | Yazmín Rivas | UD | 6 | Apr 24, 2004 | Palenque de Gallos, Tuxtla Gutiérrez, Mexico | |
| 8 | Win | 7–1 | Ofelia Dominguez | TKO | 1 (10), 0:49 | Apr 2, 2004 | Gimnasio de Mexicali, Mexicali, Mexico | Won vacant Mexican super-bantamweight title |
| 7 | Win | 6–1 | Silvia Zuniga | KO | 1 (6), 2:25 | Mar 15, 2004 | Discoteca Baby Rock, Tijuana, Mexico | |
| 6 | Win | 5–1 | Christina Avitia | TKO | 1 (4) | Feb 20, 2004 | Hilton Convention Center, Burbank, California, U.S. | |
| 5 | Win | 4–1 | Miriam Rosario | TKO | 1 (4) | Nov 21, 2003 | Club Ibiza, Whittier, California, U.S. | |
| 4 | Loss | 3–1 | Blanca Luna | MD | 4 | May 7, 2003 | Cannery Casino and Hotel, North Las Vegas, Nevada, U.S. | |
| 3 | Win | 3–0 | Leoncita Orantia | KO | 2 (4) | Apr 1, 2002 | Tijuana, Mexico | |
| 2 | Win | 2–0 | Elizabeth Sanchez | TKO | 2 (4) | Sep 14, 2001 | Tijuana, Mexico | |
| 1 | Win | 1–0 | Vicki Cozy | UD | 4 | May 29, 2001 | Aloha Tower Marketplace, Honolulu, Hawaii, U.S. | |

== See also ==
- List of female boxers
- International Women's Boxing Hall of Fame

Sporting positions
Regional boxing titles
| New title | Mexican super-bantamweight champion April 2, 2004 – February 28, 2005; Won world title | Vacant Title next held by Maria Elena Villalobos |
| Vacant Title last held by Yazmín Rivas | WBC International super-bantamweight champion February 4, 2017 – 2017; Vacated | Vacant Title next held by Yazmín Rivas |
World boxing titles
| Inaugural champion | WBA bantamweight champion February 28, 2005 – 2005; Vacated | Vacant Title next held by Anita Christensen |
| Inaugural champion | WBC super-bantamweight champion May 30, 2005 – May 20, 2006 | Succeeded by Alejandra Oliveras |
| New title | WBC super-bantamweight champion Interim title September 16, 2007 – April 30, 2009; Lost in bid for full title | Vacant Title next held by Herself |
| Vacant Title last held by Herself | WBC super-bantamweight champion Interim title January 30, 2010 – September 6, 2014; Won full title | Vacant Title next held by Dina Thorslund |
| Preceded by Alicia Ashley | WBC super-bantamweight champion September 6, 2014 – 2015; Vacated | Succeeded by Alicia Ashley |
