= Patricia Demick =

Chilean boxer

- Born: January 26, 1972 (age 54); Viña del Mar, Chile
- Occupation: Boxer

Patricia Demick (born January 26, 1972) is a Chilean boxer.

== Biography ==
=== Career ===
While she is primarily known as a boxer, she has also modeled for various magazines, frequently appearing in sports bikinis and boxing gloves.This has contributed to her recognition among fans in Chile and among women's boxing audiences in the United States.

Patricia Demick became an American citizen after marrying her American trainer.

Demick's professional boxing career began on March 26, 1999, when she knocked out experienced Karen Rios in the first round, at Hialeah, Florida. She won her next two fights, also by knockout.

After winning her first three fights by knockout, Demick and her managing team felt it was time to step up in her opposition's quality level, so Demick fought Puerto Rican Daisy Ocasio and former world champion Marsha Valley, losing back to back six round unanimous decisions to them.

After three more wins, she received her first world title try: On June 16, 2001, she fought Valérie Hénin in Anchorage, Alaska, for the WIBF world Welterweight title. The fight was declared a draw (tie) after ten rounds, but the scoring was controversial; many fans that saw the fight thought Demick deserved the decision.

Her next fight would prove to be even more controversial. She challenged Karla Redo for the WIBA's world Welterweight title, in Ft. Lauderdale, Florida. Demick became world champion by accident, as she was declared the fight's winner after eight rounds.

Demick made history for Chilean boxing that night, but her joy only lasted a few hours, because it was discovered that the judges had added their scorecards wrongly, therefore, Demick ultimately ended up losing the fight by an eight round decision.

== Acknowledgments ==
Demick went on to win two of the next three fights she had since that fight took place.

She holds a record of eight wins, four losses, and one draw, with five knockout wins. She has not had a boxing contest since 2003.
