= Alys Sánchez =

Venezuelan boxer (born 1986)

Personal information
- Nickname: La China
- Born: 3 September 1986 (age 40) Venezuela
- Weight: Super bantamweight; Featherweight

Boxing career

Boxing record
- Total fights: 25
- Wins: 17
- Win by KO: 6
- Losses: 7
- Draws: 1

Alys Sánchez (born 3 September 1986) is a Venezuelan professional boxer. She held the WBA female super bantamweight title in 2017 and the interim version from 2012 to 2014.

== Early life ==
Alys Sánchez was born on 3 September 1986.

== Professional career ==
Based in Panama, Sánchez made her professional debut on 30 September 2006.

On 30 March 2012, she defeated Paulina Cardona to capture her first championship, the vacant WBA Fedalatin female featherweight title. On 28 April, she made her first defense in her native Venezuela, defeating Diana Garcia via technical decision. On 8 December, she defeated Maria Elena Villalobos to capture the WBA female interim super bantamweight title in Jamaica. On 14 May 2014, she was defeated by Jackie Nava in Tijuana, losing her title via knockout at 46 seconds in the seventh round.

On 16 February 2015, Sánchez was defeated by WBA female interim super bantamweight champion Liliana Palmera. On 5 August 2017, the pair fought in a rematch, with Palmera now owning the full WBA female super bantamweight title. Sánchez emerged victorious, defeating Palmera via split decision. Sánchez lost the title in an immediate rematch on 18 November.
