= Gina Guidi =

American boxer (born 1962)

Personal information
- Nationality: American
- Born: May 19, 1962 (age 64)
- Weight: Super-bantamweight

Boxing career

Boxing record
- Total fights: 18
- Wins: 16
- Win by KO: 9
- Losses: 1
- Draws: 1

Gina "Boom Boom" Guidi (born May 19, 1962) is an American professional female boxer, and a three-time champion of the world. She was inducted into the International Women's Boxing Hall of Fame in 2021.

Guidi began boxing with her brothers at the local police athletic league as a teen, and has been boxing for more than 25 years. With an undefeated amateur record of 12-0 with nine knock outs (KOs), she went professional in 1994.

Guidi regularly donates time and money to non-profit organizations, including domestic abuse prevention and AIDS research programs.

Guidi is lesbian and has publicly supported various gay causes, The Advocate (LGBT magazine) noted her as "one of the few visible out lesbian boxers" in 2003.

Her professional record is 16-1-1 with six of her wins being by KO. Her only loss was to Mary Ann Almager.

== Professional boxing record ==
18 fights	16 wins	1 loss
By knockout	6	0
By decision	10	1
Draws	1	

No.	Result	Record	Opponent	Type	Round, time	Date	Location	Notes
18	Win		Britt Van Buskirk	UD		07/14/01	Centennial Hall, Hayward, California, USA	vacant Women’s International Boxing Association World welterweight title
17	Win		Kelly Whaley	TKO		03/25/01	Centennial Hall, Hayward, California, USA	
16	Win		Marsha Valley	MD		07/03/00	Hyatt Regency Hotel, Monterey, California, USA	
15	Win		Trina Ortegon	UD		04/22/00	Centennial Hall, Hayward, California, USA	International Women’s Boxing Federation World middleweight title
14	Win		Marsha Valley	MD		11/27/99	Monterey, California, USA	
13	Win		Maria Recinos	UD		03/31/99	Monterey, California, USA	
12	Win		Dora Webber	UD		06/30/98	Atlantic City, New Jersey, USA	
11	Win		Dora Webber	SD		02/15/98	Grand Casino, Biloxi, Mississippi, USA	
10	Win		Angela Buchanan	KO		05/17/97	Fantasy Springs Casino, Indio, California, USA	
9	Win		Maria Recinos	UD		04/23/97	Tropicana Hotel & Casino, Las Vegas, Nevada, USA	
8	Draw		Maria Recinos	PTS		10/19/96	San Francisco, California, USA	
7	Win		Leah Mellinger	TKO		09/28/96	Salinas, California, USA	
6	Win		Maria Recinos	UD		07/20/96	Casino West, Yerington, Nevada, USA	
5	Win		Angela Buchanan	KO		06/01/96	San Francisco, California, USA	
4	Loss		Mary Ann Almager	SD		03/23/96	Hyatt Regency Hotel, Monterey, California, USA	
3	Win		Del Pettis	KO		12/28/95	Irvine, California, USA	
2	Win		Araceli Gonzalez	TKO		11/18/95	Huntington Park, California, USA	
1	Win		Kelly Artz	PTS		05/18/95	Hilton Hotel, Reno, Nevada, USA	
