= Ana María Torres =

Mexican boxer

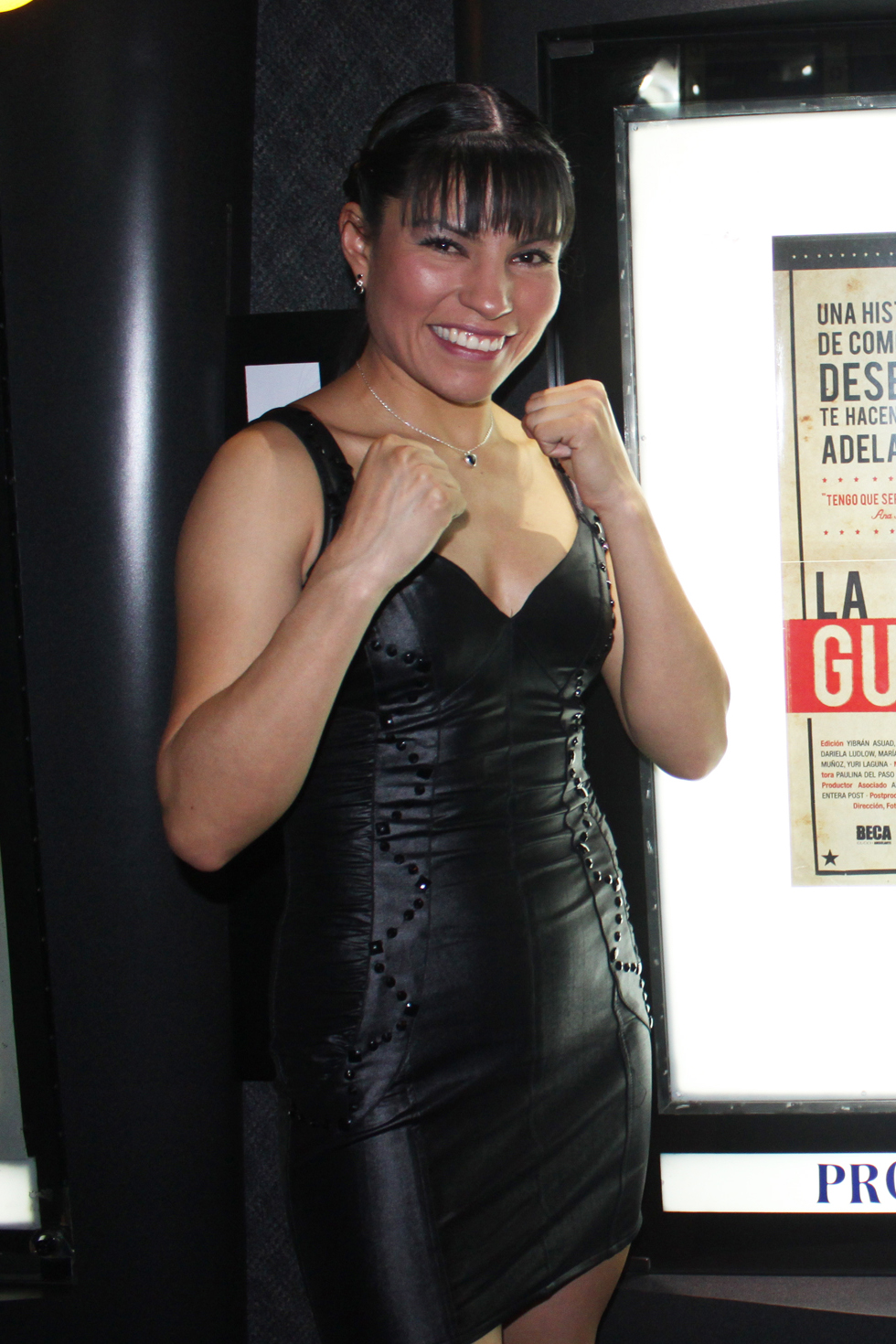

Personal information
- Nickname: La Guerrera
- Born: Ana María Torres Ramírez; 25 January 1980 (age 46) Nezahualcóyotl, México, Mexico
- Height: 163 cm (5 ft 4 in)
- Weight: Super flyweight; Bantamweight

Boxing career
- Stance: Orthodox

Boxing record
- Total fights: 34
- Wins: 28
- Win by KO: 16
- Losses: 3
- Draws: 3

Ana María Torres Ramírez (born 25 January 1980), also known as La Guerrera, is a Mexican former professional boxer who held the WBC female super-flyweight title twice between 2007 and 2012.

Torres was inducted into the International Boxing Hall of Fame as part of the class of 2024.

== Professional career ==
A professional boxer since 1999, Torres made her first attempt to claim a World title when she unsuccessfully challenged Kwang Ok Kim for the WBC female bantamweight belt in Kumgang, North Korea, on 7 June 2006, losing by split decision.

On 7 October 2006, Torres beat Mayela Perez to claim the interim WBC female super-flyweight title winning by sixth-round stoppage in Xalapa, Mexico.

Upgraded to full champion status, she defended her title on 16 April 2007 in Santo Domingo, Dominican Republic, with a unanimous decision victory over Dahianna Santana.

In her next contest, Torres lost her title by split decision to Myung Ok Ryu in Kaesong, North Korea, on 19 October 2007. A rematch took place on 26 April 2008, in Queretaro, Mexico, with the fight ending in a majority draw after one ringside judge scored it 97-93 for Torres and the other two gave it a 95–95 tie.

On 30 August 2008, Torres won the interim WBC female super-flyweight World title defeating Esmeralda Moreno by unanimous decision in Monterrey, Mexico.

Once again elevated to full champion status, Torres stopped Columbia's Paulina Cardona in round four of her first defense in Oaxaca, Mexico, on 28 February 2009. She defended her title a further 10 times during the next three years, doing so for the last time on 31 March 2012, when her challenger, Maria Andrea Miranda, was halted in the fourth round of their bout in Los Cabos, Mexico. Torres retired from professional boxing later in 2012.

== Professional boxing record ==
34 fights	28 wins	3 losses
By knockout	16	0
By decision	12	3
Draws	3	

No.	Result	Record	Opponent	Type	Round, time	Date	Location	Notes
34	Win	28–3–3	(Colombia) Maria Andrea Miranda	RTD	4 (10), 0:10	31 Mar 2012	Gimnasio Auditorio, Los Cabos, Mexico	Retained WBC female super flyweight title
33	Win	27–3–3	(Argentina) Marisa Joana Portillo	UD	10	8 Oct 2011	Los Cabos, Mexico	Retained WBC female super flyweight title
32	Win	26–3–3	(Mexico) Jackie Nava	UD	10	30 Jul 2011	Arena Jorge Cuesy Serrano, Tuxtla Gutierrez, Mexico	
31	Win	25–3–3	(Brazil) Vannessa Guimaraes	KO	4 (10), 1:32	11 Jun 2011	Auditorio Miguel Barragan, San Luis Potosi, Mexico	Retained WBC female super flyweight title
30	Draw	24–3–3	(Mexico) Jackie Nava	PTS	10	16 Apr 2011	World Trade Center, Boca del Rio, Mexico	
29	Win	24–3–2	(Japan) Naoko Yamaguchi	UD	10	22 Jan 2011	Arena Neza, Ciudad Nezahualcoyotl, Mexico	Retained WBC female super flyweight title
28	Win	23–3–2	(United States) Hollie Dunaway	TKO	6 (10), 1:13	6 Nov 2010	Polyforum Zam Ná, Merida, Mexico	Retained WBC female super flyweight title
27	Win	22–3–2	(Germany) Alesia Graf	UD	10	11 Sep 2010	Monumental Plaza de Toros México, Mexico City, Mexico	Retained WBC female super flyweight title
26	Win	21–3–2	(Colombia) Olga Julio	KO	4 (10)	3 Jul 2010	Centro de Convenciones, Tlalnepantla, Mexico	Retained WBC female super flyweight title
25	Win	20–3–2	(Guyana) Stephaney George	TKO	3 (10), 1:34	31 Oct 2009	Gimnasio Del Imcufide, Toluca, Mexico	Retained WBC female super flyweight title
24	Win	19–3–2	(United States) Ava Knight	UD	10	29 Aug 2009	Ciudad Deportiva, Mexicali, Mexico	Retained WBC female super flyweight title
23	Win	18–3–2	(Thailand) Usanakorn Thawilsuhannawang	UD	10	13 Jun 2009	Centro Banamex, Mexico City, Mexico	Retained WBC female super flyweight title
22	Win	17–3–2	(Colombia) Paulina Cardona	TKO	4 (10), 0:57	28 Feb 2009	Auditorio Guelaguetza, Oaxaca, Mexico	Retained WBC female super flyweight title
21	Win	16–3–2	(Mexico) Esmeralda Moreno	UD	10	30 Aug 2008	Arena Monterrey, Monterrey, Mexico	Won WBC interim female super flyweight title
20	Draw	15–3–2	(North Korea) Myung Ok Ryu	MD	10	26 Apr 2008	Plaza de Toros Juriquilla, Queretaro, Mexico	For WBC female super flyweight title
19	Loss	15–3–1	(North Korea) Myung Ok Ryu	SD	10	19 Oct 2007	Kaesong, North Korea	Lost WBC female super flyweight title
18	Win	15–2–1	(Dominican Republic) Dahiana Santana	UD	10	16 Apr 2007	Coliseo Carlos Teo Cruz, Santo Domingo, Dominican Republic	Retained WBC female super flyweight title
17	Win	14–2–1	(Mexico) Mayela Perez	TKO	6 (10), 1:50	7 Oct 2006	Museo de Transporte, Xalapa, Mexico	Won WBC interim female super flyweight title
16	Loss	13–2–1	(North Korea) Kwang Ok Kim	SD	10	7 Jun 2006	Mount Kumgang, Kosong, North Korea	For WBC female bantamweight title
15	Win	13–1–1	(Mexico) Gloria Rios	TKO	6 (10), 1:15	13 May 2006	Gimnasio de la Nueva Atzacoalco, Mexico City, Mexico	Won WBC-NABF female super flyweight title
14	Win	12–1–1	(Mexico) Susana Vazquez	UD	10	21 Dec 2005	Gimnasio de la Nueva Atzacoalco, Mexico City, Mexico	Won vacant Mexican female bantamweight title
13	Win	11–1–1	(Mexico) Yadira Rosales	TKO	6	10 Dec 2004	Salon Marbet Plus, Ciudad Nezahualcoyotl, Mexico	
12	Win	10–1–1	(United States) Lakeysha Williams	TKO	4 (10), 2:00	26 Mar 2004	(United States) Fort Cheyenne Casino, North Las Vegas, Nevada, U.S.	
11	Loss	9–1–1	(Mexico) Ivonne Munoz	UD	10	13 Feb 2004	Auditorio del Estado, Mexicali, Mexico	Lost Mexican female bantamweight title
10	Win	9–0–1	(Mexico) Berenice Chavez	TKO	8 (8)	19 May 2003	Auditorio Municipal, Tijuana, Mexico	
9	Win	8–0–1	(Mexico) Ofelia Dominguez	TKO	2 (6)	22 Feb 2003	Monumental Plaza de Toros México, Mexico City, Mexico	
8	Win	7–0–1	(Mexico) Mariana Juarez	UD	10	26 Jun 2002	Salon 21, Mexico City, Mexico	Won vacant Mexican female bantamweight title
7	Win	6–0–1	(Mexico) Elizabeth Ruiz	TKO	2 (4)	7 Dec 2001	Frontón Palacio Jai Alai, Tijuana, Mexico	
6	Win	5–0–1	(Mexico) Miriam Serrano	TKO	2 (6), 1:02	12 Jun 2001	Salon 21, Mexico City, Mexico	
5	Win	4–0–1	(Mexico) Berenice Chavez	PTS	4	2 Jun 2000	Irapuato, Mexico	
4	Win	3–0–1	(Mexico) Maribel Zamora	TKO	3 (4)	12 Feb 2000	Mexico City, Mexico	
3	Draw	2–0–1	(Mexico) Mariana Juarez	SD	4	11 Dec 1999	Arena Mexico, Mexico City, Mexico	
2	Win	2–0	(Mexico) Erica Juarez	TKO	3 (4)	15 Sep 1999	Arena Mexico, Mexico City, Mexico	
1	Win	1–0	(Mexico) Mariana Juarez	SD	4	3 Jul 1999	Arena Mexico, Mexico City, Mexico	
