= Melinda Cooper =

American boxer (born 1985)

Personal information
- Nickname: La Maravilla
- Born: March 6, 1985 (age 41) Las Vegas, Nevada, USA
- Height: 159 cm (5 ft 3 in)
- Weight: Super-bantamweight; Flyweight

Boxing career
- Stance: Orthodox

Boxing record
- Total fights: 26
- Wins: 24
- Win by KO: 11
- Losses: 2

Melinda "La Maravilla" Cooper (born 6 March 1985) is an American former professional boxer who held the WIBA and IBA flyweight titles and challenged for the IBF super-bantamweight championship during her 12-year career. She is a member of the International Women's Boxing Hall of Fame.

== Early life and amateur career ==
Cooper started boxing in 1996, after meeting trainer James Pena at the Nevada Partners gym in Las Vegas.

As an amateur, Cooper had a 37–2 record and competed in numerous national championships including winning the 2001 Women's National Golden Gloves in the 125lb junior division.

== Professional career ==
Cooper began her professional boxing career at the age of 17 on 23 March 2002, in Las Vegas, Nevada, winning a four-round unanimous decision over Annalisa Middleton. At the time, she made history by becoming the first female boxer under the age of 18 to be licensed in the state of Nevada.

On 14 January 2005, in her 14th pro-fight and aged 19, she claimed the WIBA and IBA flyweight titles thanks to a ninth round stoppage win over Anissa Zamarron at Agua Caliente Casino in Rancho Mirage, California.

Having won her first 21 bouts, 11 by stoppage, Cooper fought Ada Vélez for the vacant IBF super-bantamweight title at the National Stadium in San José, Costa Rica, on 31 March 2011, losing by split decision with two of the ringside judges scoring the contest 96-94 for her opponent while the third had it in her favour by the same tally. A rematch on 20 November 2011 saw Vélez retain her title by majority decision. One judge scored the fight a 95–95 draw but was overruled by the other two who scored it 98-92 and 97-93 respectively for Vélez.

Cooper had her final fight on 5 November 2014, defeating Zenny Sotomayor via unanimous decision in Tijuana, Mexico.

She was inducted into the International Women's Boxing Hall of Fame in 2020.

== Media ==
Cooper appeared in television series Necessary Roughness on the USA Network in 2011 doing fight scenes for actress Alyssa Diaz. She has also been featured in magazines including Girls' Life, Teen and World Boxing.

== After boxing ==
Cooper retired from professional boxing in 2014 and became a police officer in Las Vegas in 2017.
