= Anita Christensen =

Danish boxer

Personal information
- Born: 29 October 1972 (age 53) Randers, Denmark
- Height: 5 ft 5 in (165 cm)
- Weight: Bantamweight

Boxing career
- Reach: 65 1/2 in (166 cm)
- Stance: Orthodox

Boxing record
- Total fights: 28
- Wins: 25
- Win by KO: 8
- Losses: 1
- Draws: 1
- No contests: 1

Anita Christensen (born 29 October 1972) is a world champion female professional boxer.

== Amateur career ==
She posted a 19–2–0 record as an amateur boxer and was the 1998 Nordic 57-kg Women's Champion before turning professional.

== Professional career ==
On 16 February 2000, in Give, Denmark, Christensen won her pro debut with a 1st-round TKO over Veronica Szucz.

On 17 January 2004, in Aarhus, Denmark, Anita Christensen won a controversial ten round split (93-97 97-94 96–95) decision over Florida-based Ada Vélez to win the WIBA and WIBF Bantamweight titles. Christensen was knocked down in the eighth round, and Velez was the aggressor for much of the fight.

On 21 June 2008, in Brøndbyvester, Denmark, Christensen lost her WBA and WBC bantamweight titles to Hungarian contender Galina Koleva Ivanova.

On 26 May 2012, in Randers, Denmark, Christensen had her final fight against Isabelle Leonardi. She would win via unanimous decision.

Anita Christensen is promoted and managed by Bettina Palle and trained by Brian Mathiasen.

== Professional boxing record ==
28 fights	25 wins	1 loss
By knockout	8	0
By decision	17	1
Draws	1	
No contests	1	

No.	Result	Record	Opponent	Type	Round, time	Date	Location	Notes
28	Win	25–1–1 (1)	Isabelle Leonardi	UD	6 (6)	2012-05-26	Arena Randers, Randers, Denmark	
27	Draw	24–1–1 (1)	Kaliesha West	MD	10 (10)	2010-03-26	Arena Midt, Kjellerup, Denmark	
26	Loss	24–1 (1)	Galina Koleva Ivanova	UD	10 (10)	2008-06-21	Brøndbyhallen, Brøndbyvester, Denmark	Lost WBA, WBC and GBU bantamweight titles
25	Win	24–0 (1)	Jane Kavulani	UD	10 (10)	2008-03-23	Tobakken, Esbjerg, Denmark	Retained WBA, WBC and GBU bantamweight titles
24	Win	23–0 (1)	Mihaela Calugareanu	TKO	3 (6)	2007-11-24	Nellerupgaard Hallen, Gilleleje, Denmark	
23	Win	22–0 (1)	Betina Gabriela Garino	UD	10 (10)	2007-09-14	Forum Horsens, Horsens, Denmark	Retained WBA and GBU bantamweight titles; Won vacant WBC bantamweight title
22	Win	21–0 (1)	Eva Liskova	UD	6 (6)	2006-12-15	Antvorskovhallen, Slagelse, Denmark	
21	Win	20–0 (1)	Jessica Mohs	UD	6 (6)	2006-11-24	Falkoner Center, Frederiksberg, Denmark	
20	Win	19–0 (1)	Nadya Hokmi	UD	10 (10)	2006-10-14	Parken Stadium, Copenhagen, Denmark	Won vacant WBA, GBU and Interim WBC bantamweight titles
19	Win	18–0 (1)	Jane Kavulani	UD	6 (6)	2006-06-09	Vejlby-Risskov Hallen, Aarhus, Denmark	
18	Win	17–0 (1)	Monika Petrova	TKO	5 (6)	2005-09-30	Vesthallen, Slagelse, Denmark	
17	Win	16–0 (1)	Oksana Romanova	UD	6 (6)	2005-06-17	SAS Radisson, Aarhus, Denmark	
16	Win	15–0 (1)	Ada Vélez	SD	10 (10)	2004-01-17	SAS Radisson, Aarhus, Denmark	Won WIBA and vacant WIBF bantamweight titles
15	NC	14–0 (1)	Hagar Finer	ND	6 (6)	2003-12-13	Falkoner Center, Frederiksberg, Denmark	
14	Win	14–0	Stephanie Dobbs	UD	6 (6)	2003-10-24	K.B. Hallen, Copenhagen, Denmark	
13	Win	13–0	Daniela Graf	UD	6 (6)	2003-05-16	Congres Centrum, The Hague, Netherlands	
12	Win	12–0	Renata Vesecka	PTS	6 (6)	2003-04-25	Maritim Hotel, Magdeburg, Germany	
11	Win	11–0	Galina Gyumliyska	UD	10 (10)	2001-11-09	Odense Congress Center, Odense, Denmark	
10	Win	10–0	Iliana Boneva	KO	6 (6)	2001-10-12	Messecenter Herning, Herning, Denmark	
9	Win	9–0	Damaris Muthoni	PTS	6 (6)	2001-09-07	Lemvig idraets og kulturcenter, Lemvig, Denmark	
8	Win	8–0	Valerie Rangheard	UD	6 (6)	2001-01-19	Hadsund Hallen, Hadsund, Denmark	
7	Win	7–0	Krisztina Krek	UD	10 (10)	2000-11-24	Arena Randers, Randers, Denmark	
6	Win	6–0	Gizella Papp	TKO	4 (?)	2000-10-13	Aarhus Stadionhal, Aarhus, Denmark	
5	Win	5–0	Romy Heine	TKO	1 (6)	2000-08-19	Silkeborg Hallerne, Silkeborg, Denmark	
4	Win	4–0	Sonia Pereira	TKO	2 (6)	2000-05-25	Frederiksvaerk Hallen, Frederiksværk, Denmark	
3	Win	3–0	Chiara Benedettini	TKO	3 (4)	2000-04-29	Varde Hallen, Varde, Denmark	
2	Win	2–0	Piroska Beki	UD	4 (4)	2000-03-25	Aarhus Stadionhal, Aarhus, Denmark	
1	Win	1–0	Veronika Szucs	TKO	1 (4)	2000-02-17	Sondermarkshallen, Give, Denmark	

== See also ==
- List of female boxers
- List of Danish world boxing champions

Sporting positions
Minor world boxing titles
Preceded by Ada Vélez	WIBA bantamweight champion January 17, 2004 – 2005; Vacated	Vacant Title next held by Zhang Xiyan
Vacant Title last held by Daisy Lang	WIBF bantamweight champion January 17, 2004 – 2004; Vacated	Vacant Title next held by Bettina Csabi
Vacant Title last held by Bettina Csabi	GBU bantamweight champion October 14, 2006 – June 21, 2008	Succeeded by Galina Ivanova
Major world boxing titles
Vacant Title last held by Jackie Nava	WBA bantamweight champion October 14, 2006 – June 21, 2008	Succeeded by Galina Ivanova
New title	WBC bantamweight champion Interim title October 14, 2006 – 2006; Promoted	Vacant Title next held by Jessica Gonzalez
Preceded by Kwang Ok Kim; Vacated	WBC bantamweight champion 2006 – 2007; Vacated	Vacant Title next held by Susana Vazquez
Vacant Title last held by Susana Vazquez	WBC bantamweight champion September 14, 2007 – June 21, 2008	Succeeded by Galina Ivanova
