= Women's International Boxing Association =

Sanctioning body for women's boxing

- Abbreviation: WIBA
- Founder: Ryan Wissow and Luis Bello-Diaz
- Purpose: Boxing sanctioning organization
- Headquarters: Cooper City, Florida
- Location: Cooper City, Florida
- Region served: Worldwide
- Website: wiba-champions.com

The Women's International Boxing Association (WIBA) is a sanctioning body for women's professional boxing. Established in July 2000, it quickly grew into a major force in the sport. The WIBA is not associated with the similarly named International Boxing Association (IBA).

== History ==
The WIBA was officially founded by American Ryan Wissow and Colombian Luis Bello-Diaz. Ryan Wissow is the president and owner of the WIBA. Luis Bello-Diaz heads the Universal Boxing Council (UBC), an obscure men's sanctioning body headquartered in Bello's hometown of Cartagena, Colombia. The UBC is a separate entity from the WIBA.

The WIBA is considered a respectable championship organization for a number of reasons. The WIBA has received praise for their accurate and up-to-date ratings, the quality of WIBA title fights is consistent. A number of highly touted boxers have held WIBA titles at some point in their careers, including names like Layla Ali and Amanda Serrano.

WIBA has had title fights in Asia, Europe, South America, and the Caribbean, in addition to the USA. WIBA is geographically balanced, having champions and title fights in many parts of the world, and giving opportunities to female fighters all over the globe, opening up the sport worldwide.

WIBA is also credited for several 'firsts' in the sport. WIBA was the first to establish a 102-pound division for women's boxing, citing the need for a smaller weight class for female boxers. WIBA is also credited for legalizing women's professional boxing in the Philippines. Women's professional boxing was not legal in the Philippines (despite the fact that the island nation has a strong amateur women's boxing team). Ryan Wissow and the WIBA worked with the Games and Amusement Board (GAB), who oversee all professional sports in the Philippines, to change the laws in their books to allow women to box there professionally. The WIBA is also responsible for sanctioning the very first title fight, male or female, to take place in Guyana and in Macao.

The WIBA rates all worthy professional female boxers, including champions of other sanctioning bodies. WIBA also encourages unification bouts with other major women's sanctioning bodies like the IWBF, IFBA, WIBF, and the WBC Female Title.

WIBA's current and former champions include Laila Ali, Jacqui Frazier-Lyde, Ann Wolfe, Destiny Day-Owens, Leatitia Robinson, Gina Guidi, Sumya Anani, Kara Ro, Chevelle Hallback, Maribel Zurita, Ria Ramnarine, Emiko Raika, Marcela Acuña, Ada Vélez, Anita Christensen, Melinda Cooper, Jenifer Alcorn, Jeannine Garside, Mary Jo Sanders, Duda Yankovich, Melissa Hernández, and Sylvia Scharper.

== Current champions ==
Weight class	Champion	Reign began	Days	Record
Atomweight	(United Kingdom) Denise Castle	October 26, 2019	2564	3–2
Mini flyweight	(Germany) Asiye Özlem Sahin	Mar 16, 2019	2788	25–2–1
Light flyweight	vacant			
Flyweight	(Australia) Jasmine Parr			
Super flyweight	(Australia) Susie Ramadan	February 15, 2020	2452	28–3
Bantamweight	(United States) Rosalinda Rodriguez	March 23, 2019	2781	11–0
Super bantamweight	(Hong Kong) Ruru Yang	May 30, 2024	886	6–0–0
Featherweight	vacant			
Super featherweight	(South Korea) Bo Mi Re Shin	March 17, 2019	2787	9–1–3
Lightweight	vacant			
Light welterweight	(Germany) Alicia Kummer	April 29, 2017	3474	
Welterweight	(Republic of Ireland) Katelynn Phelan	October 17, 2020	2207	4–0
Light middleweight	(Brazil) Cris Cyborg	March 28, 2026	219	7–0
Middleweight	(Slovenia) Ema Kozin	December 15, 2017	3244	19–0–1
Super middleweight	(Slovenia) Ema Kozin	October 14, 2018	2941	19–0–1
Light heavyweight	vacant			
Heavyweight	vacant			

== See also ==
- Women's International Boxing Federation
