= Carina Moreno =

American boxer

Personal information
- Nickname: La Reina ("The Queen")
- Born: Carina Lisbed Moreno; October 9, 1981 (age 44) Watsonville, California, U.S.
- Height: 5 ft 0 in (152 cm)
- Weight: Mini flyweight; Light flyweight; Flyweight

Boxing career
- Reach: 64 in (163 cm)
- Stance: Orthodox

Boxing record
- Total fights: 32
- Wins: 25
- Win by KO: 6
- Losses: 7
Medal record
Women's Amateur boxing
Representing United States
World Championships
Bronze medal – third place	2001 Scranton	Light flyweight

Carina Lisbed Moreno (born October 9, 1981), is an American former professional boxer.

== Professional career ==
=== Early career ===
Moreno turned professional in 2003 & compiled a record of 11–1 before defeating Nanako Kikuchi, to win the WBC mini-flyweight title. She defended the title three times before losing it to Mexico's Anabel Ortiz.

=== Later career ===
She would become a two weight champion in 2012 when she beat Susi Kentikian, to win the WBA flyweight title. She would lose the title in a rematch the following year.

== Professional boxing record ==
32 fights	25 wins	7 losses
By knockout	6	0
By decision	19	7

No.	Result	Record	Opponent	Type	Round, time	Date	Location	Notes
32	Loss	25–7	Naomi Arellano Reyes	UD	6 (6)	2020-11-29	Plaza de Toros Carlos Gonzalez, Tijuana, Mexico	
31	Win	25–6	Cinthia Martinez	UD	6 (6)	2019-04-12	Big Punch Arena, Tijuana, Mexico	
30	Win	24–6	Judith Vivanco	UD	6 (6)	2019-02-15	Big Punch Arena, Tijuana, Mexico	
29	Loss	23–6	Susi Kentikian	UD	10 (10)	2013-07-06	Westfalenhallen, Dortmund, Germany	Lost WBA flyweight title
28	Win	23–5	Susi Kentikian	SD	10 (10)	2012-12-01	Burg-Waechter Castello, Düsseldorf, Germany	Won WBA flyweight title
27	Loss	22–5	Irma Sánchez	UD	10 (10)	2012-09-22	Unidad Deportiva Norte, Cortazar, Mexico	For WBF flyweight title
26	Loss	22–4	Sindy Amador	UD	6 (6)	2012-08-24	Omega Products International, Corona, California, U.S.	
25	Win	22–3	Sharon Gaines	UD	6 (6)	2011-10-28	Sherwood Inn, Salinas, California, U.S.	
24	Loss	21–3	Yésica Bopp	UD	10 (10)	2011-01-29	Polideportivo Municipal, Monte Hermoso, Argentina	For WBO light-flyweight title
23	Loss	21–2	Anabel Ortiz	UD	10 (10)	2009-10-31	Gimnasio Juan Fernández Albarrán, Toluca, Mexico	Lost WBC mini-flyweight title
22	Win	21–1	Sharon Gaines	UD	8 (8)	2009-02-06	Tachi Palace, Lemoore, California, U.S.	
21	Win	20–1	Jodie Esquibel	TKO	9 (10)	2008-10-23	Tachi Palace, Lemoore, California, U.S.	Retained WBC and WIBA mini-flyweight titles
20	Win	19–1	Yahaira Martinez	UD	10 (10)	2008-08-21	Tachi Palace, Lemoore, California, U.S.	Won vacant WIBA mini-flyweight title
19	Win	18–1	Eileen Olszewski	UD	10 (10)	2008-06-13	Isleta Casino & Resort, Albuquerque, New Mexico, U.S.	Won vacant IBA light-flyweight title
18	Win	17–1	Mayela Perez	UD	4 (4)	2008-03-20	HP Pavilion, San Jose, California, U.S.	
17	Win	16–1	Suzannah Warner	UD	10 (10)	2007-12-06	Tachi Palace, Lemoore, California, U.S.	Retained WBC mini-flyweight title
16	Win	15–1	Emily Kelly	RTD	2 (8)	2007-11-08	HP Pavilion, San Jose, California, U.S.	
15	Win	14–1	Hollie Dunaway	UD	10 (10)	2007-09-27	Tachi Palace, Lemoore, California, U.S.	Retained WBC mini-flyweight title
14	Win	13–1	Nanako Kikuchi	UD	10 (10)	2007-05-17	Tachi Palace, Lemoore, California, U.S.	Won WBC mini-flyweight title
13	Win	12–1	Suzannah Warner	UD	10 (10)	2007-02-22	Tachi Palace, Lemoore, California, U.S.	Won Interim WBC mini-flyweight title
12	Win	11–1	Savanna Hill	TKO	2 (6)	2006-12-14	Tachi Palace, Lemoore, California, U.S.	
11	Win	10–1	Valarie Rix	UD	6 (6)	2006-09-14	Tachi Palace, Lemoore, California, U.S.	
10	Win	9–1	Stephanie Dobbs	UD	8 (8)	2006-07-20	Tachi Palace, Lemoore, California, U.S.	Won vacant NABF light-flyweight title
9	Loss	8–1	Wendy Rodriguez	TD	6 (10)	2006-01-21	Coushatta Casino Resort, Kinder, Louisiana, U.S.	For vacant IBA flyweight title
8	Win	8–0	Sandra Ortiz	TKO	2 (6)	2005-11-19	Conference Center, Monterey, California, U.S.	
7	Win	7–0	Yvonne Caples	UD	8 (8)	2004-11-27	Hyatt Regency Hotel, Monterey, California, U.S.	
6	Win	6–0	Maribel Ocasio	UD	6 (6)	2004-08-14	Sports Complex, Salinas, California, U.S.	
5	Win	5–0	Deidre Yumi Hamaguchi	UD	6 (6)	2004-07-03	Hyatt Regency Hotel, Monterey, California, U.S.	
4	Win	4–0	Stephanie Dobbs	UD	6 (6)	2004-06-12	San Jose State Events Center, San Jose, California, U.S.	
3	Win	3–0	Michelle Gatewood	TKO	3 (4)	2003-11-29	Hyatt Regency Hotel, Monterey, California, U.S.	
2	Win	2–0	Brittney Conan	TKO	1 (4)	2003-09-25	HP Pavilion, San Jose, California, U.S.	
1	Win	1–0	Cecilia Barraza	UD	4 (4)	2003-07-03	Hyatt Regency Hotel, Monterey, California, U.S.	

== See also ==
- List of female boxers
- International Women's Boxing Hall of Fame

Sporting positions
Regional boxing titles
New title	NABF light-flyweight champion July 20, 2006 – February 22, 2007; Won interim title	Vacant Title next held by Yessica Chávez
Minor world boxing titles
New title	IBA light-flyweight champion June 13, 2008 – 2009; Vacated	Vacant Title next held by Anna Levina
Vacant Title last held by Nao Ikeyama	WIBA mini-flyweight champion August 21, 2008 – 2009; Vacated	Vacant Title next held by Gretchen Abaniel
Major world boxing titles
New title	WBC mini-flyweight champion Interim title February 22, 2007 – May 17, 2007; Won full title	Vacant Title next held by Naomi Togashi
Preceded by Nanako Kikuchi	WBC mini-flyweight champion May 17, 2007 – October 31, 2009	Succeeded by Anabel Ortiz
Preceded by Susi Kentikian	WBA flyweight champion December 1, 2012 – July 6, 2013	Succeeded by Susi Kentikian
