= Susi Kentikian =

German-Armenian boxer (born 1987)

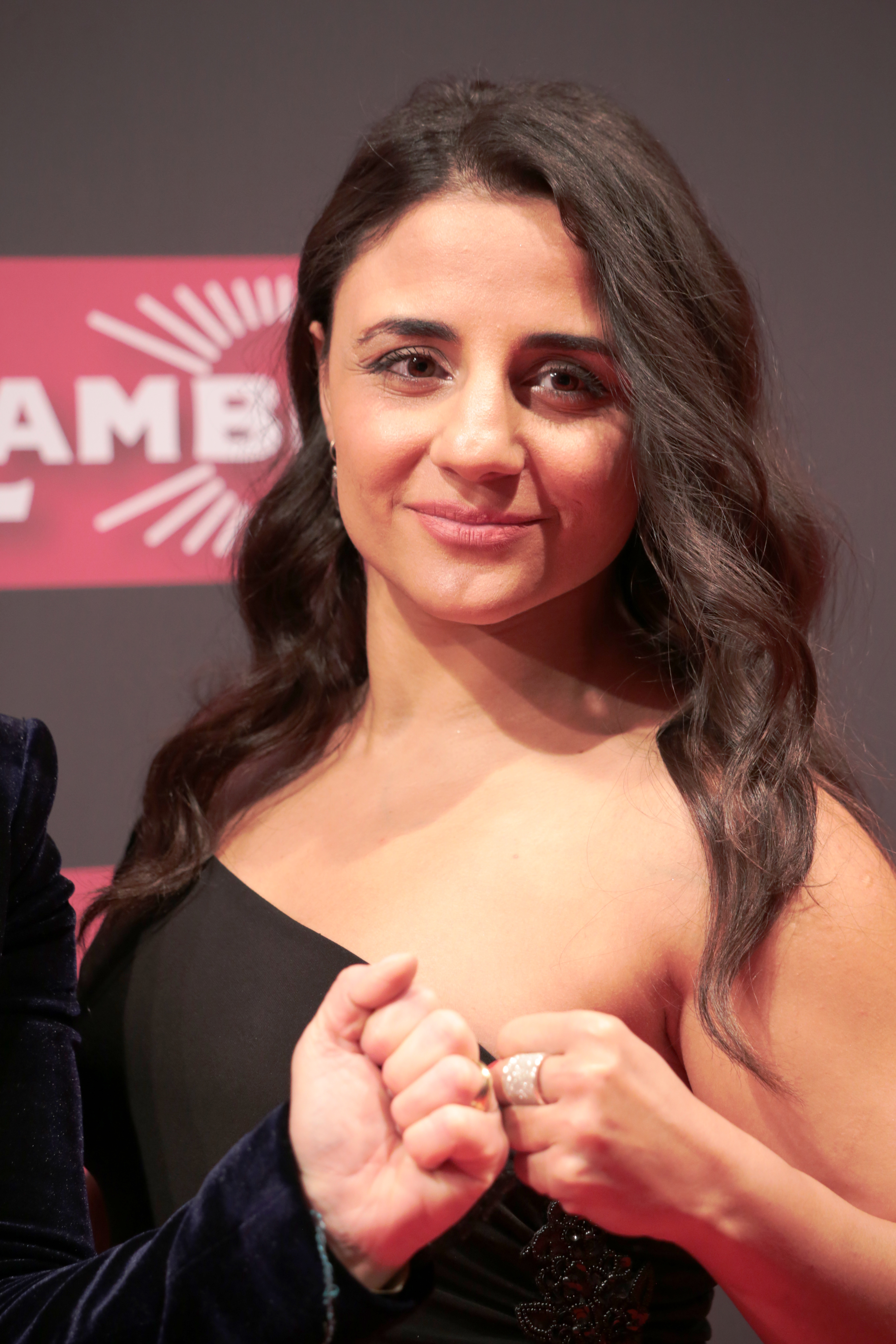
- Kentikian in 2018

Personal information
- Nickname: Killer Queen
- Nationality: Armenian citizenship; German citizenship
- Born: Susianna Levonovna Kentikian; 11 September 1987 (age 39) Yerevan, Armenian SSR, Soviet Union (now Armenia)
- Height: 1.55 m (5 ft 1 in)
- Weight: Flyweight

Boxing career
- Stance: Orthodox

Boxing record
- Total fights: 39
- Wins: 36
- Win by KO: 17
- Losses: 2
- No contests: 1

Susianna Levonovna Kentikian (Armenian: Սյուզի Կենտիկյան; born Syuzanna Kentikyan on 11 September 1987) is an Armenian-German former professional boxer who competed from 2005 to 2016. She was born in Yerevan, Armenian SSR, but left the country with her family at the age of five because of the First Nagorno-Karabakh War. Kentikian has lived in Hamburg since 1996 and began boxing at the age of 12.

Kentikian is a two-time flyweight world champion, having held the unified World Boxing Association (WBA) and World Boxing Organization (WBO) female titles between 2007 and 2012, and the WBA female title again from 2013 to 2017. Additionally, she held the Women's International Boxing Federation (WIBF) title twice between 2007 and 2017. During the 2009 WBA convention in Colombia she was named the first ever female Super champion. It was announced that this belt would be called "Susi Kentikian belt" for all other future Super champions.

Until 2012, Kentikian remained undefeated as a professional, winning 16 of her first 30 fights by knockout or stoppage. The German television station ZDF has broadcast her fights since July 2009. She had previously headlined fight cards for the television station ProSieben from 2007 to 2009. Kentikian has gained minor celebrity status in Germany and she hopes to reach a popularity similar to that of the retired German female boxing star Regina Halmich.

Kentikian was inducted into the International Women's Boxing Hall of Fame in 2022.

== Early life ==
Susianna Kentikian was born in Yerevan, Armenian SSR. At the age of five, she left Armenia with her parents and her nine-year-old brother, because her father was called up to serve in the military during the First Nagorno-Karabakh War. In 1992, the family first moved to Berlin, Germany and stayed at asylum seekers' homes. However, due to the violence at these facilities and their poor knowledge of the German language, they left Berlin and moved to Moldova and later to Russia, where Kentikian went to school for a short period of time. The family returned to Germany in 1996 and relocated in Hamburg, again living in government facilities for asylum seekers. Kentikian's residence status remained uncertain for almost a decade. Several times, she and her family were taken to the airport for deportation, but the intervention of local friends such as her amateur trainer, Frank Rieth, who called lawyers, the media and local politicians, prevented their final expulsion. Her family received a permanent residence permit in 2005 when she signed a three-year professional boxing contract that established a stable income.

At the age of 16, Kentikian began working as a cleaner in a local fitness center to help her family financially. She graduated from high school (Realschule) in the summer of 2006 and she eventually became a German citizen in June 2008. She applied for dispensation to be allowed to retain her Armenian citizenship. Kentikian lived with her family in an apartment near her Hamburg boxing gym.

== Amateur career ==
Kentikian discovered her enthusiasm for boxing when she was twelve years old after accompanying her brother to his boxing training. She started with regular training herself and stated that boxing had allowed her to forget the difficulties of her life for a short time: "I could let everything out, my whole energy. If you have so many problems like our family, you need something like that."

Kentikian won the Hamburg Championships for juniors from 2001 to 2004. She also won the Northern German Championships for juniors in 2003 and 2004, and in October 2004, she had her biggest amateur success by winning the International German Women's Amateur Championships in the featherweight division for juniors. Kentikian found it increasingly difficult to find opponents in the amateur ranks, as few boxers wanted to face her, and her status as an asylum seeker did not allow her to box outside Hamburg. Kentikian's final amateur record stood at 24 wins and one loss. She later blamed overeagerness for her single loss, having fought despite health problems at the time. Her aggressive style and fast combinations, and her ambition to always attack until she knocked out the opponent earned her the nickname "Killer Queen"; she has often used the identically named song by the English rock band Queen as her entrance music.

== Professional career ==
=== 2005–2007 ===
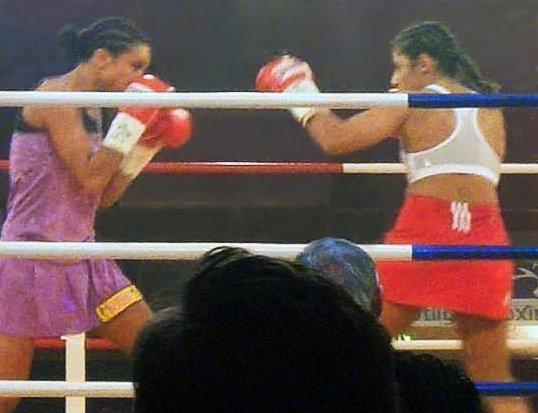
Kentikian (right) in her rematch with Nadia Hokmi, December 2007

Kentikian was discovered as a professional boxer at an exhibition fight during qualifications for the World Amateur Boxing Championships. At the beginning of 2005, she signed a three-year contract with the Hamburg boxing promoter Spotlight Boxing, a joint venture of Universum Box-Promotion, focusing on young athletes. In future years, she was coached by Universum trainer Magomed Schaburow. Kentikian started her professional career on 15 January 2005, with a win by unanimous decision over Iliana Boneva on the undercard of Regina Halmich. Over the next 14 months, Kentikian won nine of her eleven fights by knockout. Her unusually high knockout percentage, rarely seen in lower female weight classes, began to draw attention. On 25 July 2006, she won her first championship, the International German flyweight title, against Daniela Graf by unanimous decision. In her first international title fight on 9 September 2006, Kentikian beat Maribel Zurita with a fourth round technical knockout for the WIBF InterContinental flyweight title; the fight was stopped when Zurita was cut over the left eyebrow.

In her 15th professional bout, Kentikian fought for her first world championship in Cologne, Germany, on 16 February 2007; it was also her first time headlining a fight card. She won by a ninth-round technical knockout against Carolina Alvarez, thereby winning the vacant WBA female flyweight title. Alvarez took unanswered punches in most of the rounds and was bleeding heavily from her nose, prompting the referee to stop the fight in round nine out of concern for Alvarez's health. Six weeks later, on 30 March 2007, Kentikian made her first title defense. Before a crowd of 19,500 in the Kölnarena, she fought on the undercard of an exhibition bout between comedian Stefan Raab and WIBF world champion Halmich. Kentikian beat María José Núñez with a third-round technical knockout. Núñez was knocked down in round two and Kentikian finished the fight one round later with a right cross followed up by combinations that left Núñez defenseless on the ropes, causing the referee to step in.

Kentikian next faced Nadia Hokmi on 25 May 2007, in her second title defense. Hokmi, using her height and reach advantage, proved to be the first test of Kentikian's professional career and both boxers fought a competitive bout. While Hokmi started out slower, she managed to win several of the later rounds by landing repeated combinations. Kentikian won through a split decision for the first time in her career. The fight was voted among the five "Top Fights of the Year" by WomenBoxing.com. On 7 September 2007, Kentikian defended her title against Shanee Martin, winning by a third-round technical knockout. Kentikian controlled her opponent from the opening bell and the referee stopped the fight after Martin was knocked down from a straight right hand in round three.

Following the retirement of long-standing WIBF champion Halmich, Kentikian added the vacant WIBF flyweight titles in her hometown of Hamburg on 7 December 2007. She met Hokmi in a rematch of their contest six months earlier. The French boxer again proved to be a tough opponent and the fight developed similarly to their first encounter. Once more, Kentikian had the better start, but Hokmi scored during the second half of the fight, again making the bout close. This time however, Kentikian was ahead on all three of the judges' scorecards, winning by unanimous decision. After the end of the year, Kentikian was chosen as Hamburg's sportswoman of the year.

=== 2008–2010 ===
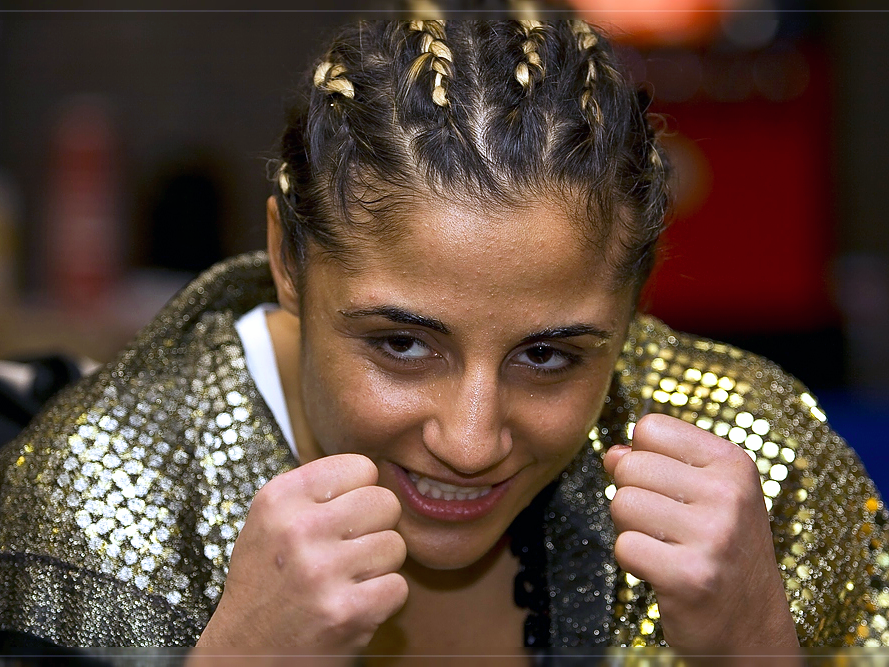
Kentikian before her fight against Sarah Goodson on 29 February 2008

Kentikian successfully defended her titles against Sarah Goodson by a third-round technical knockout on 29 February 2008. Goodson, who had fought almost exclusively in lower weight classes before, was overpowered by Kentikian and the referee ended the fight after a series of body punches in round three. In her next title defense on 10 May 2008, Kentikian beat Mary Ortega with a first-round technical knockout. Ortega, who had previously fought against well-known opponents such as Elena Reid and Hollie Dunaway, was knocked down twice by straight right hands during the first 90 seconds of the fight. When Kentikian had Ortega pinned against the ropes again, the referee stepped in shortly before the end of round one. The quick stoppage came as a surprise to many, including television commentator Halmich, who had expected a hard-fought bout.

In her next title defense on 29 August 2008, Kentikian met Hager Finer, Halmich's last opponent before retiring. Following a close opening round, the boxing match turned into a brawl and Finer scored during the first half of the fight. From round five onwards, Kentikian managed to take over the bout by landing the cleaner punches and she won by unanimous decision. On 5 December 2008, Kentikian faced Anastasia Toktaulova, the reigning GBU flyweight champion, although the GBU title was not on the line. During the uncharacteristic tactical fight, Kentikian managed to control her opponent from the middle of the ring in most of the rounds. The three judges all scored the bout in favor of Kentikian. In December 2008, she was named Germany's female boxer of the year for the first time. In addition, she won the WBA Best Female Boxer award for 2007–08.

Kentikian retained her WBA and WIBF titles with a unanimous decision win over Elena Reid on 20 March 2009. Reid, who was well known in Germany after two controversial bouts with Halmich in 2004 and 2005, remained largely passive from the opening bell and Kentikian controlled her through the majority of the fight. Reid did not win a single round on the official scorecards. On 4 July 2009, Kentikian fought the WBA Interim super flyweight champion Carolina Gutierrez Gaite. Kentikian used her speed and combinations to dominate her opponent through the ten rounds, winning every round on the judges' scores. Kentikian ended 2009 by fighting the undefeated Julia Sahin (20–0) on 10 October for the vacant WBO female flyweight title. Kentikian overwhelmed Sahin with her higher work rate early on. Sahin spent most of the fight covering up from Kentikian's many flurries. Kentikian won a unanimous decision to add the WBO title to her collection.

Kentikian, now the WBA, WBO, and WIBF champion, defended all of her titles against undefeated Women's International Boxing Association champion Nadia Raoui on 24 April 2010 in Hamburg. The bout was very close, as Kentikian was outlanded in most rounds by Raoui. After ten rounds, Kentikian held narrow advantages on two of the three judges' scorecards and won via split decision. On 17 July, Kentikian defended her championships once again against Arely Muciño. In the first few rounds, she used combinations and quick offensive attacks to score against Mucino, before suffering a cut due to an accidental clash of heads. Kentikian was unable to continue; the fight was declared a no contest and she retained her titles.

=== 2011–2016 ===
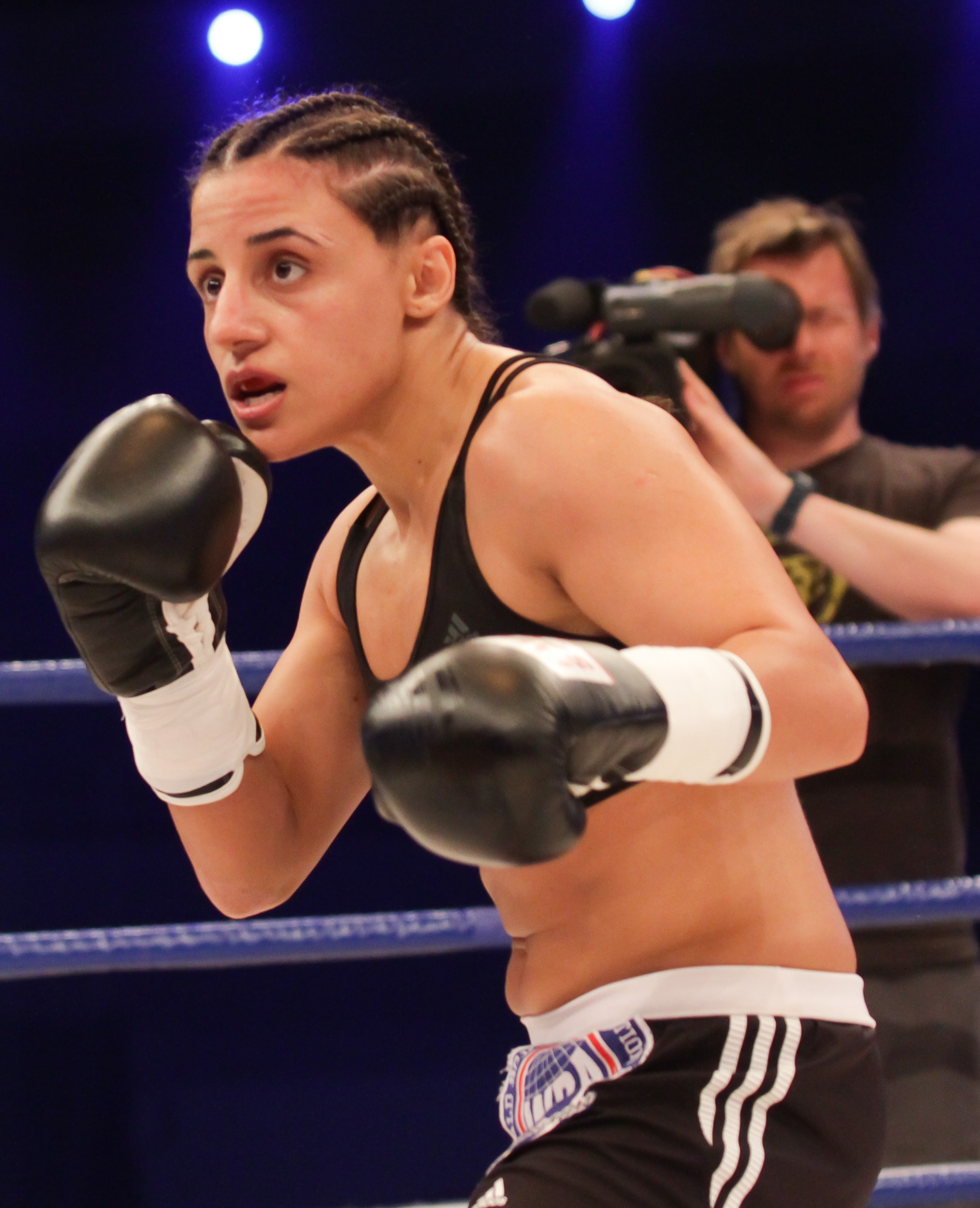
Kentikian during her July 2013 rematch with Carina Moreno

Kentikian again defended her WIBF flyweight title on 26 March 2011 against Ana Arrazola. She won at least seven rounds on each of the judges' scorecards on her way to a unanimous decision victory. Arrazola received a one-point deduction in the sixth round, as Kentikian remained the WIBF champion. Later in the year, Kentikian scored another unanimous decision win on 21 October, this time against Teeraporn Pannimit, to retain her WBA, WBO, and WIBF titles. She maintained control of the fight throughout en route to a lopsided victory.

Undefeated with 29 wins (including 16 by knockout), Kentikian next attempted to defend her WBO and WIBF flyweight titles on 16 May 2012 in Frankfurt, Germany, against Melissa McMorrow. Kentikian lost via majority decision with scores of 95–95, 94–96 and 94–96, the first time she was defeated as a professional. The WBA title was not on the line in, so Kentikian remained that organization's champion. On 1 December, Carina Moreno challenged her for the WBA title in Düsseldorf. Kentikian sought to utilize a brawling style against Moreno, but was frequently hit by Moreno's punches while moving forward. The fight was decided by majority decision after 10 rounds: one judge gave Kentikian a four-point advantage, but the other two had Moreno ahead by identical 96–94 margins as she claimed the WBA title. Kentikian suffered her second consecutive loss.

On 1 February 2013, Kentikian fought Sanae Jah for the vacant WBA Interim female flyweight title. She established command of the fight by regularly moving close to Jah and applying pressure. In the seventh round, Kentikian scored a knockdown with a right-hand punch. Despite suffering multiple cuts by her right eye, including one from a clash of heads during the 10th and final round, Kentikian was able to finish the fight and earn a unanimous decision victory. Kentikian followed that bout with a rematch against Moreno on 6 July. With a win by unanimous decision, she regained the WBA title. Kentikian made a title defense against Simona Galassi on 7 December in Stuttgart, under a scoring system in which judges could use half-points in their tallies. Each judge scored the fight in Kentikian's favor by at least 2.5 points.

Kentikian's opponent in her next title defense was Dan-Bi Kim. In the bout, which was held on 31 May 2014, Kentikian scored a technical knockout in the ninth round. On 8 November 2014, Kentikian fought Naoko Fujioka and earned the judges' decision after 10 rounds. After founding her own boxing promotion company, Kentikian Promotions, she next fought in October 2015, following an 11-month absence, against Susana Cruz Perez. Kentikian was cut in the second round by a clash of heads, but won most rounds on the judges' scorecards. The fight went the scheduled 10 rounds, and Kentikian earned a unanimous decision. The victory earned Kentikian the WIBF flyweight title. On 30 July 2016, Kentikian fought in a WIBF title defense against Nevenka Mikulic and won by unanimous decision. As of 2018, that was her most recent fight. By 2017, Kentikian's WBA title had been vacated.

== In the media ==
At the beginning of her professional career, Kentikian was primarily featured in the local media in Hamburg and occasionally in national German newspapers; in particular, her difficult childhood and her long-time uncertain asylum status sparked interest in the press and led to comparisons with the boxing film Million Dollar Baby. Her height of 1.54 m (5 ft 1 in) also drew attention, and she was dubbed "Germany's smallest professional boxer". Early on, Kentikian was considered one of the big talents in German boxing and the media mentioned her as the potential successor of record world champion Halmich, a goal she had also set out for herself.

In 2007, Kentikian was introduced to a much larger audience due to cooperation between German television station ProSieben and her promoter Spotlight Boxing. In addition to live broadcasts of her fights during so-called "ProSieben Fight Nights," she appeared several times on the popular television show TV total. She took part in a four-round sparring session with the show's host, Stefan Raab, and participated in the competitive entertainment event World Wok Championships, where she teamed with Sven Hannawald, Christina Surer and Markus Beyer to win the four-person competition. Her first world title defense, fighting María José Núñez on the undercard of a Raab vs. Halmich exhibition bout, was seen by 4.69 million television viewers—her most watched fight to date. A camera crew visited her for one year prior to her first world championship fight against Carolina Alvarez; the documentary aired in June 2007 on the German public broadcaster Das Erste. A shortened version with commentary in English was aired by the German international broadcaster Deutsche Welle in October 2007. By 2010, Kentikian became a spokesperson for the Armenian charitable organization Lebensbaum Armenien (Armenia's Tree of Life).

On 1 August 2019, she was revealed to be the Monster on The Masked Singer.

== Professional boxing record ==
39 fights	36 wins	2 losses
By knockout	17	0
By decision	19	2
No contests	1	

No.	Result	Record	Opponent	Type	Round, time	Date	Location	Notes
39	Win	36–2 (1)	Nevenka Mikulic	UD	10	30 Jul 2016	Alsterdorfer Sporthalle, Hamburg, Germany	Retained WIBF and GBU female flyweight titles
38	Win	35–2 (1)	Susana Cruz Perez	UD	10	2 Oct 2015	Inselparkhalle, Hamburg, Germany	Retained WBA female flyweight title; Won vacant WIBF and GBU female flyweight titles
37	Win	34–2 (1)	Naoko Fujioka	UD	10	8 Nov 2014	Porsche-Arena, Stuttgart, Germany	Retained WBA female flyweight title
36	Win	33–2 (1)	Dan-Bi Kim	TKO	9 (10), 1:39	31 May 2014	König Palast, Krefeld, Germany	Retained WBA female flyweight title
35	Win	32–2 (1)	Simona Galassi	UD	10	7 Dec 2013	Porsche-Arena, Stuttgart, Germany	Retained WBA female flyweight title
34	Win	31–2 (1)	Carina Moreno	UD	10	6 Jul 2013	Westfalenhalle, Dortmund, Germany	Won WBA female flyweight title
33	Win	30–2 (1)	Sanae Jah	UD	10	1 Feb 2013	ISS Dome, Düsseldorf, Germany	Won vacant WBA female interim flyweight title
32	Loss	29–2 (1)	Carina Moreno	SD	10	1 Dec 2012	Burg-Wächter Castello, Düsseldorf, Germany	Lost WBA female flyweight title
31	Loss	29–1 (1)	Melissa McMorrow	MD	10	16 May 2012	Brandenburg-Halle, Frankfurt, Germany	Lost WBO, and WIBF female flyweight titles
30	Win	29–0 (1)	Teeraporn Pannimit	UD	10	21 Oct 2011	Brandenburg-Halle, Frankfurt, Germany	Retained WBA, WBO, and WIBF female flyweight titles
29	Win	28–0 (1)	Ana Arrazola	UD	10	26 Mar 2011	Universum Gym, Hamburg, Germany	Retained WIBF flyweight title
28	NC	27–0 (1)	Arely Muciño	NC	3 (10), 0:27	17 Jul 2010	Sport- und Kongresshalle, Schwerin, Germany	WBA, WBO, and WIBF female flyweight titles at stake; NC after Kentikian was cut from an accidental head clash
27	Win	27–0	Nadia Raoui	SD	10	24 Apr 2010	Alsterdorfer Sporthalle, Hamburg, Germany	Retained WBA, WBO, and WIBF female flyweight titles
26	Win	26–0	Julia Sahin	UD	10	10 Oct 2009	StadtHalle, Rostock, Germany	Retained WBA and WIBF female flyweight titles; Won vacant WBO female flyweight title
25	Win	25–0	Carolina Marcela Gutierrez Gaite	UD	10	4 Jul 2009	Color Line Arena, Hamburg, Germany	Retained WBA and WIBF female flyweight titles
24	Win	24–0	Elena Reid	UD	10	20 Mar 2009	Alsterdorfer Sporthalle, Hamburg, Germany	Retained WBA and WIBF female flyweight titles
23	Win	23–0	Anastasia Toktaulova	UD	10	5 Dec 2008	Sporthalle Brandberge, Halle, Germany	Retained WBA and WIBF female flyweight titles
22	Win	22–0	Hagar Shmoulefeld Finer	UD	10	29 Aug 2008	Burg-Wächter Castello, Düsseldorf, Germany	Retained WBA and WIBF female flyweight titles
21	Win	21–0	Mary Ortega	TKO	1 (10), 1:53	10 May 2008	Sporthalle Brandberge, Halle, Germany	Retained WBA and WIBF female flyweight titles
20	Win	20–0	Sarah Goodson	TKO	3 (10), 0:57	29 Feb 2008	Alsterdorfer Sporthalle, Hamburg, Germany	Retained WBA and WIBF female flyweight titles
19	Win	19–0	Nadia Hokmi	UD	10	7 Dec 2007	Alsterdorfer Sporthalle, Hamburg, Germany	Retained WBA female flyweight title; Won vacant WIBF female flyweight title
18	Win	18–0	Shanee Martin	TKO	3 (10), 1:14	7 Sep 2007	Burg-Wächter Castello, Düsseldorf, Germany	Retained WBA female flyweight title
17	Win	17–0	Nadia Hokmi	SD	10	25 May 2007	Fight Night Arena, Cologne, Germany	Retained WBA female flyweight title
16	Win	16–0	Maria Jose Nunez	TKO	3 (10)	30 Mar 2007	Kölnarena, Cologne, Germany	Retained WBA female flyweight title
15	Win	15–0	Carolina Alvarez	TKO	9 (10), 0:27	16 Feb 2007	Fight Night Arena, Cologne, Germany	Won vacant WBA female flyweight title
14	Win	14–0	Maja Frenzel	TKO	4 (10), 1:35	21 Nov 2006	Universum Gym, Hamburg, Germany	Retained WIBF Inter-Continental flyweight title
13	Win	13–0	Maribel Zurita	TKO	4 (10)	9 Sep 2006	Bördelandhalle, Magdeburg, Germany	Won vacant WIBF Inter-Continental flyweight title
12	Win	12–0	Daniela Graf	UD	10	25 Jul 2006	Sportschule Sachsenwald, Hamburg, Germany	Won vacant International German female flyweight title
11	Win	11–0	Evgeniya Zablotskaya	TKO	2 (6), 1:32	15 Apr 2006	Maritim Hotel, Magdeburg, Germany	
10	Win	10–0	Emilina Metodieva	TKO	4 (6), 1:33	14 Jan 2006	Ballhaus, Aschersleben, Germany	
9	Win	9–0	Maria Krivoshapkina	UD	6	13 Dec 2005	Freizeit Arena, Sölden, Austria	
8	Win	8–0	Svetla Taskova	TKO	2 (6), 1:08	29 Oct 2005	TURM ErlebnisCity, Brandenburg, Germany	
7	Win	7–0	Renata Vesecka	TKO	4 (6), 0:58	17 Sep 2005	Harzlandhalle, Ilsenburg, Germany	
6	Win	6–0	Simona Pencakova	TKO	2 (4), 1:14	2 Jul 2005	Color Line Arena, Hamburg, Germany	
5	Win	5–0	Albena Atseva	TKO	2 (6)	4 Jun 2005	Ballhaus, Aschersleben, Germany	
4	Win	4–0	Juliia Vlasenko	TKO	3 (4), 1:50	7 May 2005	Volkswagen Halle, Braunschweig, Germany	
3	Win	3–0	Lucie Sovijusova	TKO	1 (4)	9 Mar 2005	Sporthalle Wandsbek, Hamburg, Germany	
2	Win	2–0	Debbie Lohmaier	KO	1 (4), 1:23	26 Feb 2005	Color Line Arena, Hamburg, Germany	
1	Win	1–0	Iliana Boneva	UD	4	15 Jan 2005	Bördelandhalle, Magdeburg, Germany	

Sporting positions
Minor world boxing titles
Vacant Title last held by Regina Halmich	WIBF flyweight champion 7 December 2007 – 16 May 2012	Succeeded by Melissa McMorrow
Vacant Title last held by Eva Voraberger	WIBF flyweight champion 2 October 2015 – present	Incumbent
Vacant Title last held by Eileen Olszewski	GBU female flyweight champion 2 October 2015 – present	Incumbent
Major world boxing titles
Inaugural champion	WBA female flyweight champion 16 February 2007 – 1 December 2012	Succeeded by Carina Moreno
Inaugural champion	WBO female flyweight champion 10 October 2009 – 16 May 2012	Succeeded by Melissa McMorrow
Vacant Title last held by Arely Muciño	WBA female flyweight champion Interim title 1 February 2013 – 6 July 2013; Won full title	Vacant
Preceded by Carina Moreno	WBA female flyweight champion 6 July 2013 – 2017	Succeeded by Naoko Fujioka
