= Alcivar =

Alcivar is a surname. Notable people with the surname include:

- Bob Alcivar (1938–2025), American keyboardist and music producer
- Jim Alcivar, American keyboardist and sound engineer
- Patricia Alcivar (born 1977), American boxer
