= Vaia Zaganas =

Canadian boxer (born 1975)

Personal information
- Nickname: Vicious
- Born: Vaia Anne Zaganas; May 22, 1975 (age 51) Burnaby, British Columbia, Canada
- Height: 5 ft 0 1/2 in (154 cm)
- Weight: Mini flyweight

Boxing career
- Reach: 61 in (155 cm)
- Stance: Orthodox

Boxing record
- Total fights: 19
- Wins: 16
- Win by KO: 6
- Losses: 3

Vaia Anne Zaganas is a Canadian former boxer. She was the first World Boxing Association female world champion and is a member of the International Women's Boxing Hall of Fame.

== Career ==
After discovering the sport at an early age, Zaganas went on to win the Canadian National Championships title in 1998. As part of Canada's National team, she compiled an impressive record of 36–4, winning fights in Canada, the United States and Europe. Other highlights of her amateur career include winning a second national title, twice winning gold at the U.S.A. vs Canada dual meet, twice winning gold at the U.S. national Blue and Gold event and being named "Most Outstanding Boxer" of the tournament. In 2000, she won Canada's "Rookie of The Year" award for best performance in international competition, male or female.

Before turning professional, Zaganas was ranked number one in the world by AIBA in her weight division. She moved to Las Vegas, Nevada later that year to pursue a professional boxing career. Her success in the ring continued, as she won the IFBA Straw-weight title. In 2003 she lost to Elena Luz Rodriguez in a rematch. She rebounded a year when she made history by becoming the first ever female world champion crowned by the World Boxing Association.

Zaganas was inducted into the International Women's Boxing Hall of Fame in 2025.

== Later career ==
After her boxing career, Zaganas became a stunt performer and actress.

== Professional boxing record ==
19 fights	16 wins	3 losses
By knockout	6	0
By decision	10	3

No.	Result	Record	Opponent	Type	Round, time	Date	Location	Notes
19	Win	16–3	Stephanie Dobbs	UD	10	Apr 8, 2004	Wyndham Inner Harbor Hotel, Glen Burnie, Maryland, U.S.	Won inaugural WBA mini-flyweight title
18	Win	15–3	Yumi Takano	MD	6	Mar 13, 2004	Mandalay Bay Events Center, Paradise, Nevada, U.S.	
17	Loss	14–3	Gracie Roca	MD	4	Dec 11, 2003	Fantasia Club, Woodside, New York, U.S.	
16	Win	14–2	Sarah Goodson	UD	6	Nov 22, 2003	Caesars Tahoe, Stateline, Nevada, U.S.	
15	Win	13–2	Deidre Yumi Hamaguchi	UD	6	Nov 4, 2003	Martin's West, Woodlawn, Maryland, U.S.	
14	Win	12–2	Nikki Verbeck	TKO	2 (?)	Oct 25, 2003	Sam's Town Casino, Tunica Resorts, Mississippi, U.S.	
13	Win	11–2	Tracey Stevens	TKO	2 (8)	Aug 22, 2003	Hilton Hotel, Winchester, Nevada, U.S.	
12	Win	10–2	Sarah Goodson	UD	6	Jul 25, 2003	Creek Nation Gaming Center, Tulsa, Oklahoma, U.S.	
11	Loss	9–2	Elena Luz Rodriguez	UD	6	May 24, 2003	Hilton Hotel, Reno, Nevada, U.S.	
10	Win	9–1	Hollie Dunaway	TKO	2 (4)	Apr 26, 2003	The Strat, Las Vegas, Nevada, U.S.	
9	Win	8–1	Nina Ahlin	UD	6	Apr 18, 2003	Tachi Palace, Lemoore, California, U.S.	
8	Win	7–1	Terri Moss	UD	6	Mar 27, 2003	War Memorial Auditorium, Fort Lauderdale, Florida, U.S.	
7	Win	6–1	Stephanie Dobbs	UD	6	Feb 15, 2003	Flamingo Hilton, Paradise, Nevada, U.S.	
6	Win	5–1	Sarah Goodson	TKO	8 (12)	Jun 15, 2002	Sky Ute Casino, Ignacio, Colorado, U.S.	Won vacant IFBA mini-flyweight title
5	Win	4–1	Deidre Yumi Hamaguchi	UD	6	May 15, 2002	Treasure Chest Casino, Kenner, Louisiana, U.S.	
4	Win	3–1	Deidre Yumi Hamaguchi	UD	4	Feb 16, 2002	Hilton Hotel, Winchester, Nevada, U.S.	
3	Win	2–1	Janet Williams	TKO	1 (4)	Oct 26, 2001	Vancouver, British Columbia, Canada	
2	Win	1–1	Crystal Parker	TKO	1 (4)	Oct 12, 2001	Pala Casino Spa Resort, Pala, California, U.S.	
1	Loss	0–1	Elena Luz Rodriguez	SD	4	Jul 8, 2001	Stateline Casino, West Wendover, Nevada, U.S.	

== See also ==
- List of female boxers

Sporting positions
Minor world boxing titles
Inaugural champion	IFBA mini-flyweight champion June 15, 2002 – 2003; Vacated	Vacant Title next held by Wendy Rodriguez
Major world boxing titles
Inaugural champion	WBA mini-flyweight champion April 8, 2004 – 2005; Retired	Succeeded by Cho Rong Son
