= Sachiyo Shibata =

Japanese kickboxer (born 1979)

- Born: 柴田 早千予; November 24, 1979 (age 46); Saitama Prefecture, Japan
- Other names: The Princess of Pain
- Nationality: Japanese
- Height: 1.54 m (5 ft 1/2 in)
- Weight: 52.0 kg (114.6 lb; 8.19 st)
- Division: Flyweight
- Style: Muay Thai, Kickboxing
- Team: White Dragon Gym

Professional boxing record
- Total: 7
- Wins: 4
- By knockout: 3
- Losses: 1
- Draws: 2

Kickboxing record
- Total: 32
- Wins: 24
- By knockout: 10
- Losses: 4
- Draws: 4

Other information
- Boxing record from BoxRec
- Last updated on: August 22, 2020

Sachiyo Shibata (柴田 早千予, Shibata Sachiyo)— (born November 24, 1979) is a Japanese kickboxer and Muay Thai World Champion.

== Martial arts career ==
Shibata won the ISKA World Muay Thai Flyweight title in 2001, with a third round KO over Karen Williams.

Shibata was scheduled to fight Semma Yerlice during the WCK event in Las Vegas. She won the fight by a second round TKO.

Sachiko retired from professional sports in 2007 following a knee injury.

== Titles ==
- WIKBA World Muay Thai Super Flyweight Champion
- ISKA World Jr Flyweight Champion
- WMTA World Flyweight Champion

== Kickboxing record ==
Professional Kickboxing Record
12 Wins (10 (T)KO's), 4 Losses, 0 Draw, 0 No Contest
Date	Result	Opponent	Event	Location	Method	Round	Time
2008-01-12	Win	(Germany) Sema Yerlice	WCK: Muay Thai	Las Vegas, United States	TKO	2	2:38
2005-02-05	Win	(Netherlands) Ilonka Elmont	WORLD CHAMPIONSHIP MUAY THAI	Las Vegas, United States	Decision (Split)	3	3:00
2001-7-8	Win	(United States) Karen Williams	Xplosion 2: Xplosion On Jupiters	Gold Coast, Australia	KO	3	
Wins the ISKA Flyweight Muaythai title.
Legend: Win Loss Draw/No contest Notes

== Boxing record ==
7 fights	4 wins	1 loss
By knockout	3	0
By decision	1	1
Draws	2	

No.	Result	Record	Opponent	Type	Round, time	Date	Location	Notes
7	Loss	4-1-2	(United States) Maribel Zurita	Decision (Unanimous)	10	19 August 2005	Municipal Auditorium, San Antonio, Texas, United States	
6	Win	4-0-2	(Japan) Yumi Yashima	Decision (Unanimous)	10	23 May 2004	Tokyo, Japan	
5	Draw	3-0-2	(United States) Stephanie Dobbs	Draw (Decision)	3	21 September 2003	(Japan) Greenwood Cultural Center, Tulsa, United States	
4	Win	3-0-1	(Japan) Naoko Yamaguchi	KO	3	21 September 2003	Tokyo, Japan	
3	Win	2-0-1	(Japan) Misato Yamazaki	KO	4	25 June 2003	Tokyo, Japan	
2	Draw	1-0-1	(United States) Stephanie Dobbs	Draw (Decision)	5	15 November 2002	Greenwood Cultural Center, Tulsa, United States	
1	Win	1-0	(Japan) Reiko Maruyama	TKO	4	16 December 1998	Tokyo, Japan	
