= Nevenka Mikulic =

Croatian kickboxer and boxer (born 1979)

Nevenka Mikulić
- Born: Nevenka Mikulić; September 17, 1979 (age 47)
- Other names: Nena
- Nationality: Croatian
- Height: 1.60 m (5 ft 3 in)
- Weight: 51 kg (112 lb; 8 st 0 lb)
- Division: Flyweight
- Style: Muay thai, Kickboxing, box
- Fighting out of: Karlovac, Croatia
- Team: Pit119 Karlovac
- Trainer: Reny Cappucci

Professional boxing record
- Total: 16
- Wins: 7
- By knockout: 5
- Losses: 8
- By knockout: 0
- Draws: 1

Kickboxing record
- Total: 40
- Wins: 25
- By knockout: 3
- Losses: 13
- Draws: 2

Other information
- Occupation: Art professor
- Boxing record from BoxRec

Nevenka Nena Mikulić (born September 17, 1979) is a Croatian female kickboxer and boxer, notable for challenging WIBF World flyweight title.

== Biography and early career ==
Nevenka never thought about professional sports, after finishing gymnasium she went to Teacher training college in Zagreb and trained swimming. She started training Muay Thai when returned in hometown Karlovac in Pit119 gym under Reny Cappucci.

She was two times Croatian national Muay Thai amateur champion, and won bronze medal at 2009 I.F.M.A. European championship in Latvia.

== Titles ==
Kickboxing

- 2012 Nover Federation European Muay Thai Tules Champion –53 kg.
- 2011 SMTL – Slovenian Muay Thai League Champion –54 kg
- 2009 I.F.M.A. European Championship –54 kg (bronze)

== Professional boxing record ==
7 Wins (5 knockouts, 2 decisions), 8 Losses, 1 Draws
Res.	Record	Opponent	Type	Rd., Time	Date	Location	Notes
Loss	7–8–1	(Serbia) Nina Stojanović	SD	8, 2:00	2017-02-18	(Croatia) The Westin Hotel Zagreb, Zagreb	
Win	7–7–1	(Bosnia and Herzegovina) Katarina Vištica	PTS	4 , 2:00	2016-10-15	(Croatia) School Sport Hall, Otok	
Loss	6–7–1	(Germany) Susi Kentikian	UD	10, 2:00	2016-07-30	(Germany) Sporthalle, Alsterdorf, Hamburg	WIBF World flyweight title. GBU Female World flyweight title.
Loss	6–6–1	(France) Jessica Tamara Vargas	SD	10, 2:00	2016-04-22	(France) Palais des Sports, Orléans, Loiret	Vacant EBU female super bantamweight title.
Win	6–5–1	(Croatia) Anamarija Boras	TKO	1 (6)	2015-12-19	(Croatia) Podstrana	
Loss	5–5–1	(Italy) Vissia Trovato	PTS	6, 2:00	2015-12-04	(Italy) Palazzetto dello Sport, Rezzato, Lombardia	
Loss	5–4–1	(Italy) Valeria Imbrogno	PTS	4, 2:00	2015-06-06	(Italy) Milan, Lombardy	
Win	5–3–1	(Bosnia and Herzegovina) Anamarija Maras	TKO	1 (6)	2015-04-18	(Croatia) Podstrana	
Loss	4–3–1	(France) Karine Rinaldo	UD	10, 2:00	2014-12-06	(France) Palais des Sports U Palatinu, Ajaccio, Corse-du-Sud	EBU female super bantamweight title.
Win	4–2–1	(Croatia) Kristina Boras	TKO	3 (6)	2014-07-17	(Croatia) Podstrana	
Win	3–2–1	(Germany) Ana Mari Grobo	KO	3 (6)	2014-04-18	(Croatia) Podstrana	
Draw	2–2–1	(Belgium) Sanae Jah	MD	6, 2:00	2014-02-09	(Belgium) Brussels, Bruxelles-Capital	
Win	2–2	(Germany) Irina Scheuermann	TKO	4	2013-12-15	(Croatia) Boxing Club Podstrana, Podstrana	
Loss	1–2	(Sweden) Johanna Rydberg	UD	4, 2:00	2013-11-08	(Sweden) Kalmar Sporthall, Kalmar	
Loss	1–1	(Bosnia and Herzegovina) Paša Malagić	PTS	6, 2:00	2013-07-27	(Bosnia and Herzegovina) Brčko	
Win	1–0	(Croatia) Manuela Žulj	PTS	4, 2:00	2013-05-24	(Croatia) Boxing Club Podstrana, Podstrana	Professional debut.

== Kickboxing record ==
Professional kickboxing record
Date	Result	Opponent	Event	Location	Method	Round	Time
2013-09-29	Loss	(Serbia) Saida Bukvić	WKU Pro Event	Novi Pazar, Serbia	Decision	3	3:00
For WKU European Low Kick Championship –52.5 kg.
2013-04-13	Loss	(Netherlands) Ilona Wijmans	Enfusion live 4	Novo Mesto, Slovenia	Decision	5	3:00
For Enfusion Live World Championship –57 kg.
2012-12-08	Loss	(Slovakia) Lucia Krajčovič	Fight Explosion	Bratislava, Slovakia	Decision	3	3:00
2012-11-17	Win	(Morocco) Amarhoun Aisha	Mondiali Iron Fighting	Pordenone, Italy	Decision (Unanimous)	3	3:00
2012-10-27	Win	(Netherlands) Lisa de Boer	Bajić Team & Ameno Fight Night	Split, Croatia	Decision (Unanimous)	3	3:00
2012-09-29	Draw	(Morocco) Amarhoun Aisha	BPN Prvi srpski security grand prix	Novi Sad, Serbia	Decision (Draw)	3	3:00
2012-02-18	Win	(Netherlands) Ferida Kirat			Decision (Unanimous)	5	3:00
Wins Nover Federation European Muay Thai Tules Title –53 kg.
2012-02-10	Win	(Serbia) Đenđi Fleiss	VVVF – Veni Vidi Vici Fights	Karlovac, Croatia	TKO	1	
2011-11-26	Loss	(Italy) Ghicci Mittino			Decision	5	3:00
For WAKO Pro muay-thai rules European title –54 kg.
2011-11-19	Draw	(Italy) Katia Currò	Trieste fight night	Trieste, Italy	Decision draw	3	3:00
2011-10-08	Loss	(Netherlands) Jemyma Betrian	Muaythai Premier League	Padova, Italy	Decision	3	3:00
2011-04-09	Win	(Slovenia) Tanja Brulc	Slovenian muay thai league	Brežice, Slovenia	TKO		
2011-02-05	Win	(Netherlands) Ferida Kirat	The night of champions 2011	Novo Mesto, Slovenia	Decision	4	2:00
Wins SMTL -54 kg Championship.
2010-08-11	Win	(Thailand) PloyAmnat	Queen's Cup	Bangkok, Thailand			
2010	Loss	(Italy) Sindy Huyer					
2009-02-10	Win	(Italy) Stefania Macchia	Opatija Fight Night 1	Opatija, Croatia	Decision	3	2:00
2008-10-18	Win	(Croatia) Mirjana Vace	Opatija Challenger 2008	Opatija, Croatia	Decision		

Amateur kickboxing record
Date	Result	Opponent	Event	Location	Method	Round	Time
2010-05-27	Loss	(Ukraine) Lena Ovchynnikova	I.F.M.A. European Muaythai Championships 2010 –54 kg	Velletri, Italy	Decision	4	2:00
2009-11-27	Loss	(Thailand) Prakaidao Pramari	I.F.M.A. World Championships 2009, Quarter Finals -54 kg	Bangkok, Thailand	Decision	4	2:00
2009-05	Loss	(England) Anna Zucchelli	I.F.M.A. European Championships 2009, Semi Finals -57 kg	Liepāja, Latvia	Decision	4	2:00
Wins 2009 I.F.M.A. European Championships Bronze Medal –71kg.
2009-05	Win	(Belgium)	I.F.M.A. European Championships 2009, Quarter Finals –57 kg	Liepāja, Latvia	Decision	4	2:00
Legend: Win Loss Draw/No contest Notes
