= Maribel Zurita =

American boxer (born 1979)

Personal information
- Nationality: American
- Born: 14 January 1979 (age 47) San Antonio, Texas, USA
- Height: 5 ft 0 in (1.52 m)
- Weight: lightweight

Boxing career
- Stance: Orthodox

Boxing record
- Total fights: 11
- Wins: 8
- Losses: 3

Maribel "Little Thunder" Zurita (born January 14, 1979) is an American boxer. She is the WIBA Light Flyweight World Champion and former IFBA Flyweight World Champion in women's boxing. She fights out of San Antonio, Texas and was trained by Tony Ayala Sr.

== Career ==
Zurita's professional debut was on July 31, 2001 at Sunset Station in San Antonio, Texas, easily winning a four-round decision over debut fighter Anna Mora. According to a ringside report from Esteban Erik Stipnieks, "Maribel quickly won over the fans and dominated the fight. It was four rounds of Maribel flaunting her amateur background. Mora made it interesting by holding on and making an occasional counter but this fight was made for Zurita."

On October 26, 2001 at Frank Erwin Center in Austin, Texas, WIBF Americas Junior Flyweight champion Juana (Jay) Vega of Austin won a four-round unanimous decision over Zurita in a flyweight bout. Vega improved to 5-0 (2 KO) while Zurita slipped to 1-1.

On January 25, 2002 at Randy's Ballroom in San Antonio, Zurita and debut fighter Gracie Olivarez of Houston fought to a majority draw over four rounds.

On January 31, 2002 at Roy Wilkins Auditorium in St. Paul, Minnesota, Zurita won a four-round unanimous decision over Shannon Brown.

On May 3, 2002 at Randy's Ballroom in San Antonio, Zurita won a unanimous four-round decision over Gracie Olivarez in a closely fought bout carried live on ESPN2's Friday Night Fights.

On June 21, 2002 at Sunset Station, a standing-room-only crowd of about 2,000 watched WIBF Americas Junior Flyweight champion Juana (Jay) Vega advance to 6-1-0 (1 KO) with a six-round unanimous decision over Zurita.

On August 16, 2002 at Sunset Station, Zurita won a four-round unanimous decision over Terri Moss of Athens, Georgia. Zurita worked her way inside on the taller fighter.

On November 14, 2002 at American Airlines Arena in Miami, Florida, Patricia Martinez of Miami won a unanimous (40-36) four-round decision over Zurita in a flyweight bout. Martinez thrived on trading with Zurita, bloodied her nose in the opening round and continued to control the fight. Zurita's record slid to 4-3-1 (0 KO).

On February 20, 2003 at Renaissance Hotel in Austin, Texas, Anissa Zamarron won a six-round split decision.

On May 16, 2003 at Sunset Station, Zurita won a six-round unanimous decision over Juana (Jay) Vega of Austin, reversing their previous result at this location.

On February 12, 2004 in Austin, Texas, Anissa Zamarron won a controversial 8-round unanimous decision over Zurita for the Texas State Junior Flyweight title.

On September 18, 2004 at Jinseon Girls' High School in Seoul, Korea, 1000 fans watched Zurita win a ten-round unanimous (96-95 96-94 97-96) decision over Korea's Shin Hee Choi for the vacant IFBA Flyweight title. Zurita finished the fight with a big final round. Zurita improved to 6-5-1 (0 KO).

On March 30, 2005 at Sunrise International Ballroom in Shenyang, China, Zurita lost the IFBA Flyweight title in a rematch with Shin by a badly split decision under controversial circumstances. Referee Byungk Kim of South Korea, stopped the bout in the eighth round when Choi was badly cut by what was ruled as a head-butt. The bout went to the scorecards where South Koreans Kwang Woo Kim and Jaebung Kim had both scored it 68-65 for Choi while American judge Bruce Anderson had scored it 70-64 for Zurita, giving Zurita every round on his scorecard. Manager and trainer Tony Ayala, Sr. filed a protest with the IFBA to review the stoppage. The IFBA reviewed the result but awarded the title to Shin.

On August 19, 2005 at the Municipal Auditorium in San Antonio, Texas, Zurita won the vacant WIBA Light Flyweight World Title with a 10-round unanimous (98-92 98-92 99-91) decision over Sachiyo Shibata of Japan. San Antonio reporter John Whisler called the bout "San Antonio's Fight of the Year." Zurita raised her record to 7-6-1 with 1 KO.

== Professional boxing record ==
20 fights	10 wins	8 losses
By knockout	1	1
By decision	9	7
Draws	2	

No.	Result	Record	Opponent	Type	Round, time	Date	Location	Notes
20	Win		Mayela Perez	MD		2008-11-08	Joy of Austin, Round Rock	
19	Win		Bianca Ledezma	UD		2008-05-30	Municipal Auditorium, San Antonio	
18	Draw		Emily Kelly	MD		2007-04-14	Alamodome, San Antonio	
17	Loss		Susi Kentikian	TKO	4 (10)	2006-09-09	Bordelandhalle, Magdeburg	
16	Win		Rocio Vazquez	UD		2006-02-10	Roseland Ballroom, San Antonio	
15	Loss		Anissa Zamarron	SD		2005-11-18	Rosedale Ballroom, San Antonio	Women's International Boxing Association World Light Flyweight Title
14	Win		Sachiyo Shibata	UD	10	2005-08-19	Municipal Auditorium, San Antonio	vacant Women's International Boxing Association World Light Flyweight Title
13	Loss		Choi Shin-hee	TD		2005-03-30	Hotel Sunrise International, Shenyang	International Female Boxers Association World Flyweight Title
12	Win		Choi Shin-hee	UD		2004-09-18	Jinseon Girls' High School, Seoul	vacant International Female Boxers Association World Flyweight Title
11	Loss		Anissa Zamarron	UD		2004-02-12	Hilton Hotel, Austin	
10	Win		Juana Vega	UD		2003-05-16	Sunset Station, San Antonio	
9	Loss		Anissa Zamarron	SD		2003-02-20	Renaissance Hotel, Austin	
8	Loss		Patricia Martinez	UD		2002-11-14	American Airlines Arena, Miami	
7	Win		Terri Moss	UD		2002-08-16	Sunset Station, San Antonio	
6	Loss		Juana Vega	UD		2002-06-21	Sunset Station, San Antonio	
5	Win		Graciela Olivares	UD		2002-05-03	Randy's Ballroom, San Antonio	
4	Win		Shannon Brown	TKO		2002-01-31	Roy Wilkins Auditorium, Saint Paul	
3	Draw		Graciela Olivares	PTS		2002-01-25	Randy's Ballroom, San Antonio	
2	Loss		Juana Vega	UD		2001-10-26	Erwin Center, Austin	
1	Win		Anna Mora	UD		2001-07-31	Sunset Station, San Antonio	
