= María Jesús Rosa (boxer) =

Spanish boxer (1974–2018)

Personal information
- Nationality: Spanish
- Born: María Jesús Rosa Reina; 20 June 1974 Madrid, Spain
- Died: 18 December 2018 (aged 44) Madrid
- Weight: Flyweight; Light Flyweight

Boxing career
- Stance: Orthodox

Boxing record
- Total fights: 19
- Wins: 18
- Win by KO: 4
- Losses: 1
- Draws: 0

María Jesús Rosa Reina (20 June 1974 – 18 December 2018) was a Spanish boxer, WIBF and four-time European flyweight champion. She was posthumously inducted into the International Women's Boxing Hall of Fame in 2024.

== Biography ==
Rosa Reina was trained by José Chumilla. Her first professional fight was in 1999 against the Spanish champion Esther Paez.

On 5 March 2002, after knocking out Viktoria Varga, she became the European flyweight champion and she defended her European title three times that year. She fought with big boxers like the American Terri Moss, against whom she won the vacant WIBF World Light Flyweight championship on 6 November 2003 in Madrid, or the WIBF World Flyweight champion, the German Regina Halmich.

In 2005, Rosa Reina retired after being defeated in a world title fight by WIBF World Flyweight champion Regina Halmich on 10 November 2005, who won by the 12-round decision of the judges.

Her final record was nineteen matches won, four by knockout, with one loss and no draws.

Rosa Reina died on 18 December 2018 as a result of cancer. She was 44.

== Professional boxing record ==
| 20 fights | 19 wins | 1 loss |
|---|---|---|
| By knockout | 4 | 0 |
| By decision | 15 | 1 |
| Draws | 0 | |

| No. | Result | Record | Opponent | Type | Round, time | Date | Location | Notes |
|---|---|---|---|---|---|---|---|---|
| 20 | Lost | 19–1 | (Germany) Regina Halmich | SD | 10 | 10 Sep 2005 | Dm-Arena, Karlsruhe, Germany | for IBF flyweight title |
| 19 | Win | 19–0 | (Ukraine) Valentina Kliyubar | TD | 6 | 15 Apr 2005 | Madrid, Spain | |
| 18 | Win | 18–0 | (Slovakia) Lucie Sovijusova | TKO | ? (6) | 29 Oct 2004 | Palacio de Vistalegre, Madrid, Spain | |
| 17 | Win | 17–0 | (United States) Terri Moss | UD | 10 | 6 Nov 2004 | Alcobendas, Spain | Won IBF World light flyweight title |
| 16 | Win | 16–0 | (Russia) Veda Spivak | TKO | ? (6) | 7 Jun 2003 | Palma de Mallorca, Spain | |
| 15 | Win | 15–0 | (Hungary) Viktoria Varga | TKO | 7 (10) | 12 Dec 2002 | Real Madrid Sport Hall, Madrid, Spain | Retained IBF European flyweight title |
| 14 | Win | 14–0 | (Russia) Nina Abrosova | UD | 10 | 3 Oct 2002 | Polideportivo Magarinos, Madrid, Spain | Retained IBF European flyweight title |
| 13 | Win | 13–0 | (Portugal) Sonia Pereira | UD | 10 | 23 May 2002 | Polideportivo Magarinos, Madrid, Spain | Retained IBF European flyweight title |
| 12 | Win | 12–0 | (Hungary) Viktoria Varga | TKO | 6 (10) | 5 Mar 2002 | Polideportivo Magarinos, Madrid, Spain | Won IBF European flyweight title |
| 11 | Win | 11–0 | (Russia) Nina Abrosova | PTS | 6 | 20 Oct 2001 | Polideportivo Sage 2000, Madrid, Spain | |
| 10 | Win | 10–0 | (Hungary) Mariann Pampuk | PTS | 6 | 28 Jul 2001 | Las Mesas, Spain | |
| 9 | Win | 9–0 | (Hungary) Timea Dencsi | PTS | 4 | 12 May 2001 | Madrid, Spain | |
| 8 | Win | 8–0 | (Hungary) Szilvia Porteleki | PTS | 4 | 10 Feb 2001 | Madrid, Spain | |
| 7 | Win | 7–0 | (Russia) Nina Abrosova | PTS | 4 | 1 Dec 2000 | Azpeitia, Spain | |
| 6 | Win | 6–0 | (Spain) Marta Mayral | PTS | 4 | 17 Nov 2000 | Valencia, Spain | |
| 5 | Win | 5–0 | (Hungary) Mariann Pampuk | PTS | 6 | 28 Jul 2000 | Cuenca, Spain | |
| 4 | Win | 4–0 | (Hungary) Mariann Pampuk | PTS | 4 | 12 May 2000 | Palma de Mallorca, Spain | |
| 3 | Win | 3–0 | (Spain) Estibaliz Cano | UD | 4 | 20 Feb 2000 | Madrid, Spain | |
| 2 | Win | 2–0 | (Spain) Elena Alonso | UD | 4 | 17 Oct 1999 | Seville, Spain | |
| 1 | Win | 1–0 | (Spain) Esther Paez | UD | 4 | 18 Jun 1999 | Seville, Spain | Won Spanish flyweight title |
