= Choi Shin-hee =

South Korean boxer

Personal information
- Nationality: South Korean
- Born: 21 March 1983 (age 43) Seongnam, Gyeonggi Province, South Korea
- Height: 5 ft 5 in (1.65 m)
- Weight: lightweight

Korean name
- Hangul: 최신희
- RR: Choe Sinhui
- MR: Ch'oe Sinhŭi

Boxing career
- Stance: Orthodox

Boxing record
- Total fights: 11
- Wins: 8
- Losses: 3

Choi Shin-hee (Korean: 최신희; married name Baumgardner; born, March 21, 1983) is a South Korean female boxer. She competed professionally since 2004 and is a former 2005-2006 IFBA Flyweight Champion. She was defeated in 2007 by Elena Reid. She retired in 2008 and owns the Seongnam Boxing Gym. Her boxing nickname was “The Beauty”.

== Early life and education ==
Choi was born on March 21, 1983, in Seoul, South Korea. She started to train in boxing in 2002 for dieting and exercise when she was 19, and began an amateur career under coach Sang Kwon Park in 2002. She attended Yongin University from 2005 to 2009.

== Boxing career ==
Choi was a 2003 Amateur Boxing Gold medalist and had earned an amateur record of 6-1 when she decided to go professional in 2003. She won the KBC Korean Championship by 2004 against Jin-Young Kim.

In 2005 Choi traveled to China to face Maribel Zurita for the IFBA Flyweight World Championship and won by split-decision. Eight months later she successfully defended and won the IFBA Flyweight World Championship in Seongnam City against Jet Izumi of Japan. In 2006, she was awarded a Korean Presidential Citation from President Roh Moo-Hyun. She also became a Boxing Coach for the Korean Air Force Academy.

In 2007, with a record of nine fights and eight wins, Choi fought Elena Reid in Temecula, California losing the title by decision.

In 2007 was a boxing commentator on MBC, ESPN, and KBS N Sports.

== Other career events ==
Choi was on variety of TV programs and in magazine articles.

- TV programs: XTM “Go Super Korean”, a Japanese variety show called TBS Kunoichi, and KBS “Star Golden Bell”. She was also on Yoon Dohyun’s “Love Letters”.
- Magazines: Choi was featured in Vogue Korea, GM Daewu, Allure, Men's Health, Adidas Stella Macartney, Diet Friends, Dove, Ecole, and Ceci. Magazines
- She was also featured in a 2010 music video from the South Korean Musician CHO PD.

== Professional boxing record ==
11 fights	8 wins	3 losses
By knockout	4	1
By decision	4	2

No.	Result	Record	Opponent	Type	Round, time	Date	Location	Notes
11	Loss		Young Shim Ryu	KO		2007-10-19	Kaesong, North Korea	
10	Loss		(United States) Elena Reid	UD		2007-07-02	Pechanga Resort & Casino, Temecula, California, US	International Female Boxers Association World flyweight title
9	Win		Saichon Taichio	KO		2006-04-22	Shingoo University, Seongnam City, South Korea	
8	Win		Jet Izumi	KO		2005-11-12	Seongnam City, South Korea	International Female Boxers Association World flyweight title
7	Win		(United States) Maribel Zurita	TD		2005-03-30	Hotel Sunrise International, Shenyang, China	International Female Boxers Association World flyweight title
6	Win		Marisha Allard	KO		2004-11-28	Goyang City, South Korea	
5	Loss		Maribel Zurita	UD		2004-11-28	Jinseon Girls' High School, Seoul, South Korea	vacant International Female Boxers Association World flyweight title÷
4	Win		Jin-Young Kim	PTS		2004-05-08	Segokdong Hall, Seoul, South Korea	
3	Win		Na-Yun Um	PTS		2004-02-28	Shinheung University, Uijeongbu City, South Korea	
2	Win		Ji-Eun Kim	PTS		2003-12-06	Gooil Highschool, Seoul, South Korea	
1	Win		Na-Yun Um	KO		2003-09-27	KyoYuk MunHwa HoeKwan, Seoul, South Korea	
