= Terri Moss =

American boxer

- Born: January 25, 1966 (age 60); Boulder, Colorado, U.S.
- Other names: The Boss
- Nationality: American
- Height: 5 ft 1 in (155 cm)
- Weight: 125 lb (57 kg; 8.9 st)
- Division: Featherweight (Boxing)
- Reach: 64 in (163 cm)

Professional boxing record
- Total: 18
- Wins: 9
- By knockout: 3
- Losses: 9
- By knockout: 1

Terri Moss (born January 25, 1966) is a retired female boxer, and a 2015 inductee into the International Women's Boxing Hall of Fame.

== Background ==
Her family moved to Athens, Georgia in 1975 where she grew up and resided until 2003 when she moved to Atlanta to work with professional boxing trainer, Xavier Biggs. Xavier is the brother of 1984 Olympic Super Heavyweight Gold Medalist Tyrell Biggs. Prior to boxing, Moss pursued a career in Law Enforcement working at several different levels in that field. She spent the majority of her career as a Narcotics Investigator.

== Boxing career ==
Moss began her experience in boxing at the age of 34 under Chicago native "Doc" Keppner and worked with him for two years. Keppner was reluctant to train Moss due to her age and physical limitations (Hepatitis C) that would keep her out of the ring, However; he did use her as his assistant working corners of his professional fighters and taught her to be a cut man. Prior to beginning her own boxing career she had worked over twenty professional fights as chief second and cutman. She was one of the first females documented to have been cut man and chief second for a male fighter.

During her time with Keppner, Moss sought medical attention and underwent Interferon Therapy. Once cured of Hepatitis C, she resumed training to box competitively, entering the professional ranks at 36 years old.

Moss began her pro career in a fight offered by Keppner against newly crowned WIBA Intercontinental Champion Wendy Sprowl of Boston, Massachusetts, losing a unanimous four round decision. Her second came against future IFBA & WIBA World Champion Maribel Zurita, and the third against #1 ranked Patricia Martinez, each to whom she dropped decisions. At 0-3 Moss began training with Xavier Biggs, and soon after fought was Atlanta's highly touted and #1 world ranked minimumweight Nina Ahlin. Prior to the fight against Moss, Ahlin was also trained by Xavier Biggs. Moss landed her first win against Ahlin, one of the biggest moments in her career also rated one of the biggest upsets in women's professional boxing that year, and was shortly after ranked #2 in the world. She held that ranking for over two years and remained a top-ten rated fighter for the rest of her career.

During her career Moss fought for five world titles in three weight divisions. On May 10, 2007 she won the WIBF Strawweight World Title, and the WIBA mini flyweight Intercontinental Title in Tulsa, Oklahoma, against Stephanie Dobbs. Moss was 41 years old, and Dobbs only 28, two years older than Moss' own daughter. After two failed attempts to arrange a title defense, Moss retired without a defense one year later on May 10, 2008. She retired in Atlanta, Georgia as a full-time boxing trainer and personal trainer for women in an all-female boxing program at Decatur Boxing Club in Decatur, GA. Moss trains competing amateur and professional boxers, conducts boxing fitness programs, and is a personal trainer and author.

== After retirement ==
Once retired Moss founded "Atlanta Corporate Fight Night", a high-end white collar charity boxing show, and began promoting in October 2010. By the end of 2012 she had promoted five successful shows and partnered with Tomorrow Pictures in moving Corporate Fight Night nationally while building material for a documentary on women's boxing. Over the two year - five show time span her Corporate Fight Night had been discussed on several radio and internet radio shows, magazines, newspapers, television, and news media outlets both in the US and internationally. Some of the coverage included CNN, ESPN, NBC, Yahoo Sports, The Atlanta Journal-Constitution, Atlanta Magazine, Best Self Magazine, Stiletto Woman Magazine, Ebony Magazine, Sports Destination Management, and Bloomberg Businessweek.

In 2011 Moss began working with several professional boxing sanctioning bodies and began supervising world championship fights. She serves as the chairman of women's boxing for the Champions of Dignity Association (CODA) which financially supports the Retired Boxer's Foundation (RBF)and in 2012 she was designated as a coordinator for the Women's International Boxing Federation (WIBF) and the Global Boxing Union (GBU) where she assists in sanctioning and supervising for men's (GBU) and women's (WIBF & GBU) world championship fights.

== Hall of Fame ==
Terri Moss was among the second class of inductees into the International Women's Boxing Hall of Fame in Fort Lauderdale, Florida on July 11, 2015.

She was inducted alongside Laila Ali, Jeannine Garside, Deirdre Gogarty, Phyllis Kugler, Sparkle Lee, Laura Serrano and Ann Wolfe.

== Professional boxing record ==
18 fights	9 wins	9 losses
By knockout	3	1
By decision	6	8

No.	Result	Record	Opponent	Type	Round, time	Date	Location	Notes
18	Win		Stephanie Dobbs	SD		2007-05-10	Crowne Plaza Hotel, Tulsa	vacant Women's International Boxing Federation World Minimumweight Title
17	Win		Whitney Gunter	TKO		2007-04-14	Lawrence Joel Veterans Memorial Coliseum, Winston-Salem	
16	Win		Natasha Wilburn	UD		2007-02-02	Georgia Mountain Center, Gainesville	
15	Loss		Krisztina Belinszky	UD		2005-12-10	Emperor Garden, Budapest	
14	Loss		Mary Ortega	TKO		2005-06-11	Harrah's Hotel & Casino, Kansas City	International Women's Boxing Federation World Light Flyweight Title
13	Loss		Marisol Miranda	UD		2005-02-26	Argosy Casino, Baton Rouge	
12	Win		Hollie Dunaway			2004-12-16	Garibaldi's Night Club, Doraville	Women's International Boxing Association World Minimumweight Title
11	Win		Loreen Miller	TKO		2004-11-20	Greensboro, United States	
10	Win		Elizabeth Gandy	UD		2004-04-08	Argosy Casino Atrium, Baton Rouge	
9	Loss		María Jesús Rosa Reina	UD		2003-11-06	Pabellon B, Alcobendas	Women's International Boxing Federation World Light Flyweight Title
8	Win		Charimar Caban	UD			Dekalb Events Center, Atlanta	
7	Loss	3-4	Vaia Zaganas	UD	6	2003-03-27	War Memorial Auditorium, Fort Lauderdale, Florida, U.S.	
6	Win	3-3	Stephanie Dobbs	UD	4	2003-01-18	Biggs Boxing Forum, Atlanta, Georgia, U.S.	
5	Win	2-3	Angela Kirkes	TKO	1 (4)	2002-12-03	Omni New Daisy Theater, Memphis, Tennessee, U.S.	
4	Win	1-3	Nina Ahlin	SD	4	2002-09-13	Roxy Theater, Atlanta, Georgia, U.S.	
3	Loss	0-3	Patricia Martinez	UD	4	2002-08-30	Holiday Inn, Manchester, New Hampshire, U.S.	
2	Loss	0-2	Maribel Zurita	UD	4	2002-08-16	Sunset Station, San Antonio, Texas, U.S.	
1	Loss	0-1	Wendy Sprowl	UD	4	2002-02-22	The Roxy, Boston, Massachusetts, U.S.	Professional debut
