= Patricia Alcivar =

American boxer

Personal information
- Nickname: Patty Boom Boom
- Nationality: American; Colombian
- Born: December 12, 1977 (age 48) Barranquilla, Colombia
- Height: 5 ft 4 in (163 cm)
- Weight: Flyweight; Super flyweight

Boxing career
- Stance: Orthodox

Boxing record
- Total fights: 12
- Wins: 8
- Win by KO: 3
- Losses: 4

Patricia Alcivar (born December 12, 1977) is a competitive road and adventure racer and former professional boxer.

== Early life ==
Alcivar was born in Barranquilla, Colombia, but grew up in Jackson Heights, Queens, where her family moved when she was a toddler. She was raised in an abusive household and moved out on her own at the age of 15. She worked a part-time job to support herself while finishing high school with honors.

== Early Martial Arts Career ==
Alcivar practiced and competed in the martial art of Kyokushin. She started at the age of 13 and won a world championship at age 18 at the Manhattan Center in 1995.

== Amateur Boxing Career ==
Alcivar started her amateur Boxing career shortly after winning the world title in Kyokushin. She enrolled in a Boxing Aerobics class where she challenged the coach of the class who was Martin Snow. Alcivar in her amateur career was noted as a pioneer in women's boxing. She had around 35 amateur fights and won two New York City Daily News Golden Gloves Championships, a national championship and won an international competition. She was the first female boxer to be voted the athlete of the year by the United States Olympic Committee.,

== Professional boxing career ==
Patricia started her professional Boxing Career on October 9, 2009, with a first-round knockout over Jennifer Batchelder. This fight took place in Columbia, Tennessee. Alcivar then faced Laura Gomez on May 16, 2010, in Kissimmee, Florida. and won that fight by a fourth-round TKO. Im her third fight on August 13, 2010, she won by TKO in the third round over Shari Denise Jacobs in Tampa, Florida. Alcivar then had a rematch with Laura Gomez on March 4, 2011, in Alcivar's home town of Queens, New York, and was taken the distance for the first time with unanimous decision with all three judges scoring all four rounds for Alcivar. Alcivar defeated Savanna "The Lioness" Hill on April 2, 2011, at Roger Dean Stadium in Jupiter, Florida. She won by a decisive six-round unanimous decision. The cards read 60-54 twice and 60-53.

== Professional boxing record ==
13 fights	8 wins	4 losses
By knockout	3	1
By decision	5	3
No contests	1	

No.	Result	Record	Opponent	Type	Round, time	Date	Location	Notes
12	Loss		Keisher McLeod Wells	UD		2015-05-30	Resorts World Casino, Queens	USA New York State Female Flyweight Title
11	Win		Peggy Maerz	UD		2015-03-13	The Space at Westbury, Westbury	
10	Loss		Chantel Cordova	SD		2014-07-11	Fantasy Springs Casino, Indio	vacant NABF Female Super Flyweight Title
9	Loss		Eileen Olszewski	TKO		2013-09-25	Five Star Banquet, Long Island City, Queens	vacant International Female Boxers Association World Flyweight Title
8	Win		Eileen Olszewski	UD		2013-03-27	Five Star Banquet, Long Island City, Queens	vacant USA New York State Female Flyweight Title
7	Win		Vanessa Greco	UD		2012-06-08	Cordon Bleu, Woodhaven	
6	Loss		Keisher McLeod Wells	SD		2012-03-07	BB King Blues Club & Grill, New York	
5	Win		Savanna Hill	UD		2011-04-02	Roger Dean Stadium, Jupiter	
4	Win		Ana Laura Gomez	UD		2011-03-04	Cordon Bleu, Woodhaven	
3	Win		Sheri Denise Jacobs	TKO		2010-08-13	A La Carte Event Pavilion, Tampa	
2	Win		Ana Laura Gomez	TKO		2010-05-14	Civic Center, Kissimmee	
1	Win		Jennifer Batchelder	KO		2009-10-09	National Guard Armory, Columbia	

== See also ==
- List of female boxers
