= Eileen Olszewski =

American boxer (born 1968)

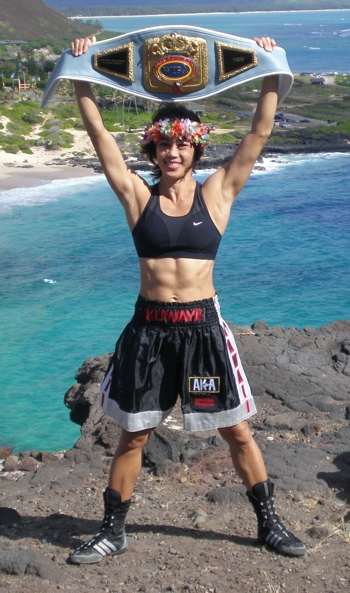
- Olszewski holding WIBA title belt, August 2010

Personal information
- Nickname: "The Hawaiian Mongoose"
- Born: Eileen Miyoko Kuwaye Olszewski; September 17, 1968 (age 57) Hawaii, U.S.
- Weight: 112 lb (51 kg)

Boxing career
- Stance: Orthodox

Boxing record
- Total fights: 20
- Wins: 10
- Win by KO: 1
- Losses: 7
- Draws: 3

Eileen Olszewski (born September 17, 1968) is the first female boxer from Hawaii to achieve international success at the professional and amateur levels. She is the oldest professional flyweight boxer, male or female, to win a share of the world flyweight title in history.

== Amateur career ==
During her three-year reign in the amateurs, Olszewski fought in the 112 lb. division, with a record of 28–0 (7 TKO's) in the national level amateur competition and a 3–4 (2 TKO) record at the international level. Olszewski completed her amateur career in 2003 and began boxing professionally in 2006.

== Professional career ==
Olszewski turned pro at age 38 in November 2006 and was undefeated in her first six professional bouts. Olsewski drew and lost for the WBC female world flyweight title, lost for the IBA female world light flyweight title, and won the WIBA and Global Boxing Union world flyweight titles. On September 25, 2013, Olszewski, age 45, still ranked tenth in the world among female flyweights on BoxRec, became the oldest world flyweight champion, male or female, when she stopped Patricia Alcivar in the eighth round of their scheduled ten round world championship bout, to win a share of the world flyweight title. On November 10, 2014, Olszewski became the oldest current World Champion in the entire sport of boxing. Under Manager David Selwyn, Olszewski won 3 World titles.

== Professional boxing record ==
20 fights	10 wins	7 losses
By knockout	1	0
By decision	9	7
Draws	3	

No.	Result	Record	Opponent	Type	Round, time	Date	Location	Notes
20	Loss		Eva Voraberger	UD		2016-10-22	Wimberger Hotel, Vienna, Austria	vacant International Boxing Organization World female super flyweight title (supervisor: Benedetto vacant Women's International Boxing Federation World super flyweight title vacant Global Boxing Union Female World super flyweight title
19	Loss		Raja Amasheh	UD		2016-01-30	Centro De Convenciones, Rosarito, Baja California, Mexico	WBC Silver female flyweight title
18	Win		Cristina Fuentes	UD		2015-01-16	Laredo Energy Arena, Laredo, Texas, USA	International Female Boxers Association World flyweight title
17	Draw		Cristina Fuentes	SD		2014-09-05	Masonic Temple, Brooklyn, New York, USA	
16	Win		(United States) Jodie Esquibel	UD		2014-01-18	Five Star Banquet, Long Island City, Queens, New York, USA	vacant Universal Boxing Federation (UBF) International female flyweight title
15	Win		(United States) Patricia Alcivar	TKO		2013-09-25	Five Star Banquet, Long Island City, Queens, New York, USA	vacant International Female Boxers Association World flyweight title
14	Loss		(United States) Patricia Alcivar	UD		2013-03-27	Five Star Banquet, Long Island City, Queens, New York, USA	vacant USA New York State female flyweight title
13	Loss		Nadia Raoui	UD		2012-04-13	Lanxess-Arena, Cologne, Nordrhein-Westfalen, Germany	Women's International Boxing Association World flyweight title
12	Loss		(United States) Melissa McMorrow	SD		2011-06-24	Cordon Bleu, Woodhaven, New York, USA	vacant USA New York State female flyweight title
11	Win		Anastasia Toktaulova	UD		2010-12-17	American Airlines Arena, Miami, Florida, USA	Women's International Boxing Association World flyweight title Global Boxing Union Female World flyweight title
10	Win		Suzannah Warner	UD		2010-10-22	Capitale, New York, New York, USA	
9	Draw		Nadia Raoui	PTS		2008-12-20	Hallenstadion, Zurich, Switzerland	Women's International Boxing Association World flyweight title
8	Loss		(Italy) Simona Galassi	UD		2008-07-18	Civitanova Marche, Marche, Italy	WBC World female flyweight title
7	Loss		Carina Moreno	UD		2008-06-13	Isleta Casino & Resort, Albuquerque, New Mexico, USA	vacant International Boxing Association female light flyweight title
6	Win		(United States) Elena Reid	MD		2008-02-28	Roseland Ballroom, New York, New York, USA	Women's International Boxing Association World flyweight title
5	Draw		Stefania Bianchini	MD		2007-09-14	Palasport, Ariano nel Polesine, Veneto, Italy	WBC World female flyweight title
4	Win		Suzannah Warner	MD		2007-08-24	Utopia Paradise Theatre, Bronx, New York, USA	
3	Win		Kimberly Tomes	UD		2007-05-18	Beacon Theatre, New York, New York, USA	
2	Win		(United States) Noriko Kariya	SD		2007-02-17	Hammerstein Ballroom, New York, New York, USA	
1	Win		Kimberly Tomes	UD		2006-11-03	Monticello Raceway, Monticello, New York, USA	
