= Hollie Dunaway =

American boxer (born 1984)

Personal information
- Nickname: Hot Stuff
- Born: Hollie Natashia Dunaway; October 18, 1984 (age 41) Van Buren, Arkansas, U.S.
- Height: 5 ft 0 in (152 cm)
- Weight: Mini flyweight; Light flyweight; Flyweight; Super flyweight

Boxing career
- Reach: 63 in (160 cm)
- Stance: Orthodox

Boxing record
- Total fights: 37
- Wins: 23
- Win by KO: 10
- Losses: 11
- Draws: 1
- No contests: 2

Hollie Natashia Dunaway (born October 18, 1984) is an American former professional boxer who competed from 2003 to 2013. She held the IBA female mini flyweight title from 2004 to 2006 and challenged for 3 major female world titles. Dunaway is a member of the International Women's Boxing Hall of Fame.

== Career ==
Dunaway had no amateur boxing background before she turned professional. She made her boxing debut on February 4, 2003, at The New Daisy Theatre in Memphis, Tennessee, where she lost to Melissa Shaffer. She lost two of her first three professional bouts, but went on to win 13 of her next 14.

On April 16, 2005, in Magdeburg, Germany, Regina Halmich won a ten-round unanimous decision over Dunaway, defending her Women's International Boxing Federation flyweight title. As of July 2005, Dunaway's professional boxing record was 14-4-0 (9 KOs). On February 16, 2006, she successfully defended her Women's International Boxing Association (WIBA) mini flyweight title against Shaffer in Kansas City, Missouri, winning in a unanimous decision (100-90, 99-91, 99-91). This result made Dunaway's record 15-5-0 (9 KOs). On September 21, 2006, she defended her WIBA mini flyweight world title for the second time against Dee Hamaguchi, knocking her down twice in the first round and winning the match by seventh-round stoppage. On November 25, 2006, she went to Budapest and beat world champion Krisztina Belinszky (19-4-2) for two world titles. On March 15, 2007, at the Ameristar Casino in St. Louis, Dunaway beat Wendy Rodriguez (17-2-3) in an eight-round unanimous decision. The judges' scores were 80-72, 80-72, and 79-73. On August 3, 2007, she beat Mary Ortega (28-3-1) in a unanimous decision by the judges.

On January 11, 2008, Dunaway moved up to flyweight and captured the North American Boxing Federation flyweight title by beating Sharon Gaines in a unanimous decision (she later fought Gaines to a draw on September 27 of the same year). On June 13, she lost to Rodriguez while fighting for the vacant International Boxing Association mini flyweight title. On February 28, 2009, she lost in South Korea against Hi Jyun Park for the International Female Boxers Association mini flyweight title. On August 22, she beat Mayela Perez. In 2010, she won against Chantel Cordova on January 28. She lost to Ana Maria Torres on November 6, fighting for the WBC super flyweight title. In 2011, 2012, and 2013, she fought only once per year. She lost to Katia Gutiérrez on April 16, 2011, in a fight for the vacant International Boxing Federation mini flyweight title. A fight against Becky Garcia on April 26, 2012, ended in no contest. She lost to Cordova on November 15, 2013.

Dunaway has fought in four weight divisions.

In October 2025, she was named among the inductees for the 2026 International Women's Boxing Hall of Fame class.

== Professional boxing record ==
37 fights	23 wins	11 losses
By knockout	10	3
By decision	13	8
Draws	1	
No contests	2	

No.	Result	Record	Opponent	Type	Round, time	Date	Location	Notes
37	Loss	23–11–1 (2)	Chantel Cordova	UD	6	15 Nov 2013	Prairie Meadows, Altoona, Iowa, U.S.	
36	NC	23–10–1 (2)	Becky Garcia	NC	5	26 Apr 2012	Hyatt Regency Hotel, Tulsa, Oklahoma, U.S.	
35	Loss	23–10–1 (1)	Katia Gutiérrez	UD	10	16 Apr 2011	World Trade Center, Boca del Río, Mexico	For vacant IBF female mini flyweight title
34	Loss	23–9–1 (1)	Ana María Torres	TKO	6 (10), 1:13	6 Nov 2010	Poliforum Zamna, Mérida, Mexico	For WBC female super flyweight title
33	Win	23–8–1 (1)	Chantel Cordova	SD	6	28 Jan 2010	Coca-Cola Center, Oklahoma City, Oklahoma, U.S.	
32	Win	22–8–1 (1)	Mayela Perez	UD	6	22 Aug 2009	Chaifetz Arena, St. Louis, Missouri, U.S.	
31	Loss	21–8–1 (1)	Ji Hyun Park	UD	10	28 Feb 2009	Palpal Gymnasium, Seoul, South Korea	For IFBA mini flyweight title
30	Draw	21–7–1 (1)	Sharon Gaines	MD	6	27 Sep 2008	Paris Resort & Casino, Paradise, Nevada, U.S.	
29	Loss	21–7 (1)	Wendy Rodriguez	SD	10	13 Jun 2008	Isleta Casino & Resort, Albuquerque, New Mexico, U.S.	For vacant WIBA mini flyweight title
28	Win	21–6 (1)	Sharon Gaines	UD	10	11 Jan 2008	Viking Hotel Grand Ballroom, St. Louis, Missouri, U.S.	Won vacant NABF female flyweight title
27	Loss	20–6 (1)	Carina Moreno	UD	10	27 Sep 2007	Tachi Palace, Lemoore, California, U.S.	For WBC female mini flyweight title
26	Win	20–5 (1)	Mary Ortega	UD	8	3 Aug 2007	Ameristar Casinos, St. Charles, Missouri, U.S.	
25	Loss	19–5 (1)	Hülya Şahin	SD	10	30 Jun 2007	Porsche-Arena, Stuttgart, Germany	For WIBF junior flyweight title
24	Win	19–4 (1)	Wendy Rodriguez	UD	8	15 Mar 2007	Ameristar Casinos, St. Charles, Missouri, U.S.	
23	Win	18–4 (1)	Stephanie Dobbs	UD	6	22 Feb 2007	Tachi Palace, Lemoore, California, U.S.	
22	Win	17–4 (1)	Krisztina Belinszky	SD	10	25 Nov 2006	Wekerle Sandor Leisure Complex, Mór, Hungary	Won GBU female mini flyweight title
21	Win	16–4 (1)	Dee Hamaguchi	RTD	7 (10), 3:00	21 Sep 2006	Ameristar Casinos, St. Charles, Missouri, U.S.	Retained WIBA mini flyweight title
20	Win	15–4 (1)	Melissa Shaffer	UD	10	16 Feb 2006	Harrah's North, Kansas City, Missouri, U.S.	Retained WIBA mini flyweight title
19	Win	14–4 (1)	Anna Maddox	TKO	2 (4), 2:00	18 Jun 2005	World Class Fitness Center, Fort Smith, Arkansas, U.S.	
18	Loss	13–4 (1)	Regina Halmich	UD	10	16 Apr 2005	Bordelandhalle, Magdeburg, Germany	For WIBF flyweight title
17	Win	13–3 (1)	Terri Moss	UD	10	16 Dec 2004	Garibaldi's Night Club, Doraville, Georgia, U.S.	Won vacant WIBA mini flyweight title
16	NC	12–3 (1)	Sarah Goodson	NC	4	15 Oct 2004	Mid-America All-Indian Center, Wichita, Kansas, U.S.	
15	Win	12–3	Tammy McGuire	TKO	3 (4)	9 Oct 2004	World Class Fitness Center, Fort Smith, Arkansas, U.S.	
14	Win	11–3	Angel Shipps	TKO	1 (6), 0:44	19 Jun 2004	World Class Fitness Center, Fort Smith, Arkansas, U.S.	Won vacant USA Mid West female junior flyweight title
13	Win	10–3	Alejandra Lopez	TKO	2 (4)	3 Apr 2004	Austin-Shain Youth Center, Clarksville, Arkansas, U.S.	
12	Win	9–3	Kathy Garman	TKO	3 (4), 1:13	12 Mar 2004	Farmer's Market, Oklahoma City, Oklahoma, U.S.	
11	Win	8–3	Nikki Verbeck	UD	4	6 Feb 2004	Farmer's Market, Oklahoma City, Oklahoma, U.S.	
10	Win	7–3	Stephanie Dobbs	MD	6	24 Jan 2004	Fire Lake Casino, Shawnee, Oklahoma, U.S.	
9	Win	6–3	Kathy Garman	TKO	4 (4), 1:44	14 Nov 2003	Farmer's Market, Oklahoma City, Oklahoma, U.S.	
8	Win	5–3	Shannon Birmingham	UD	4	25 Oct 2003	Sam's Town Hotel and Gambling Hall, Tunica, Mississippi, U.S.	
7	Win	4–3	Jacqueline Carlton	TKO	1 (4)	4 Oct 2003	World Class Fitness Center, Fort Smith, Arkansas, U.S.	
6	Loss	3–3	Stephanie Dobbs	MD	4	12 Jul 2003	Caesars Tahoe, Stateline, Nevada, U.S.	
5	Win	3–2	Alejandra Lopez	UD	4	28 Jun 2003	Farmer's Market, Oklahoma City, Oklahoma, U.S.	
4	Win	2–2	Shelan Rayford	TKO	2 (4)	14 Jun 2003	World Class Fitness Center, Fort Smith, Arkansas, U.S.	
3	Loss	1–2	Vaia Zaganas	TKO	2 (4)	26 Apr 2003	Stratosphere Hotel & Casino, Paradise, Nevada, U.S.	
2	Win	1–1	Jayde Chafardon	TKO	1 (4)	22 Mar 2003	Wild Wings Club, Fort Smith, Arkansas, U.S.	
1	Loss	0–1	Melissa Shaffer	TKO	2 (4)	4 Feb 2003	Omni New Daisy Theater, Memphis, Tennessee, U.S.	
