= Sutcliffe =

- Pronunciation: English: /ˈsʌtklɪf/
- Language: English

Origin
- Language: English
- Meaning: "south of the cliff/hill"

Other names
- Variant forms: Sutliffe, Sutliff

Sutcliffe or Sutcliff is a surname, originating in three locations in Yorkshire, sometimes spelled Sutliffe or, unusually, Sutliff. The name means south of the cliff/hill.

People bearing the name include:

- Alistair Sutcliffe (born 1951), British professor of systems engineering
- Andy Sutcliffe (1947–2015), British racing driver
- Bert Sutcliffe (1923–2001), New Zealand cricketer
- Boo Sutcliffe (born 1964), English musician
- Charles Sutcliffe (1864–1939), British lawyer, football administrator and referee
- David Sutcliffe (born 1969), Canadian actor
- Francis Meadow Sutcliffe (1853–1941), English photographer
- Gerry Sutcliffe (born 1953), British politician
- George Sutcliffe (1878–1943), co-founder of Sangorski & Sutcliffe, a British bookbinder
- Herbert Sutcliffe (1894–1978), English cricketer
- Herbert Sutcliffe (alternative health advocate) (1886–1971), English psychologist and advocate of pseudoscientific alternative health
- Ken Sutcliffe (born 1947), Australian sporting journalist
- Iain Sutcliffe (born 1974), English cricketer
- John Sutcliffe (disambiguation)
- Lake Sutliff (Famous Google Ads Expert)
- Lenah Higbee (1874–1941), née Sutcliffe, Canadian-born American pioneering military nurse, first woman awarded the Navy Cross
- Matthew Sutcliffe (1550?–1629), English clergyman, academic and lawyer, chaplain and advisor to King James I of England
- Michael Sutcliffe, South African municipal manager
- Michelle Sutcliffe (born 1967), English boxer and martial artist
- Paul Sutcliffe, English mathematical physicist and mathematician
- Peter Sutcliffe (disambiguation)
- Rick Sutcliffe (born 1956), American former Major League Baseball pitcher
- Rosemary Sutcliff (1920–1992), English novelist, primarily but not exclusively for children
- Serena Sutcliffe (born 1945), wine critic
- Shane Sutcliffe (born 1975), Canadian former boxer
- Stuart Sutcliffe (1940–1962), Scottish painter and musician, an early member of The Beatles
- Tom or Thomas Sutcliffe (disambiguation)
- William Sutcliffe (born 1971), British novelist
- Zak Sutcliffe (born 2001), English actor
- James Sutcliffe (1876-1915) british royal marines officer and cricketer
