= Ewe Cote =

Hamlet in North Yorkshire, England

Coordinates: 54.4848°N 0.6456°W

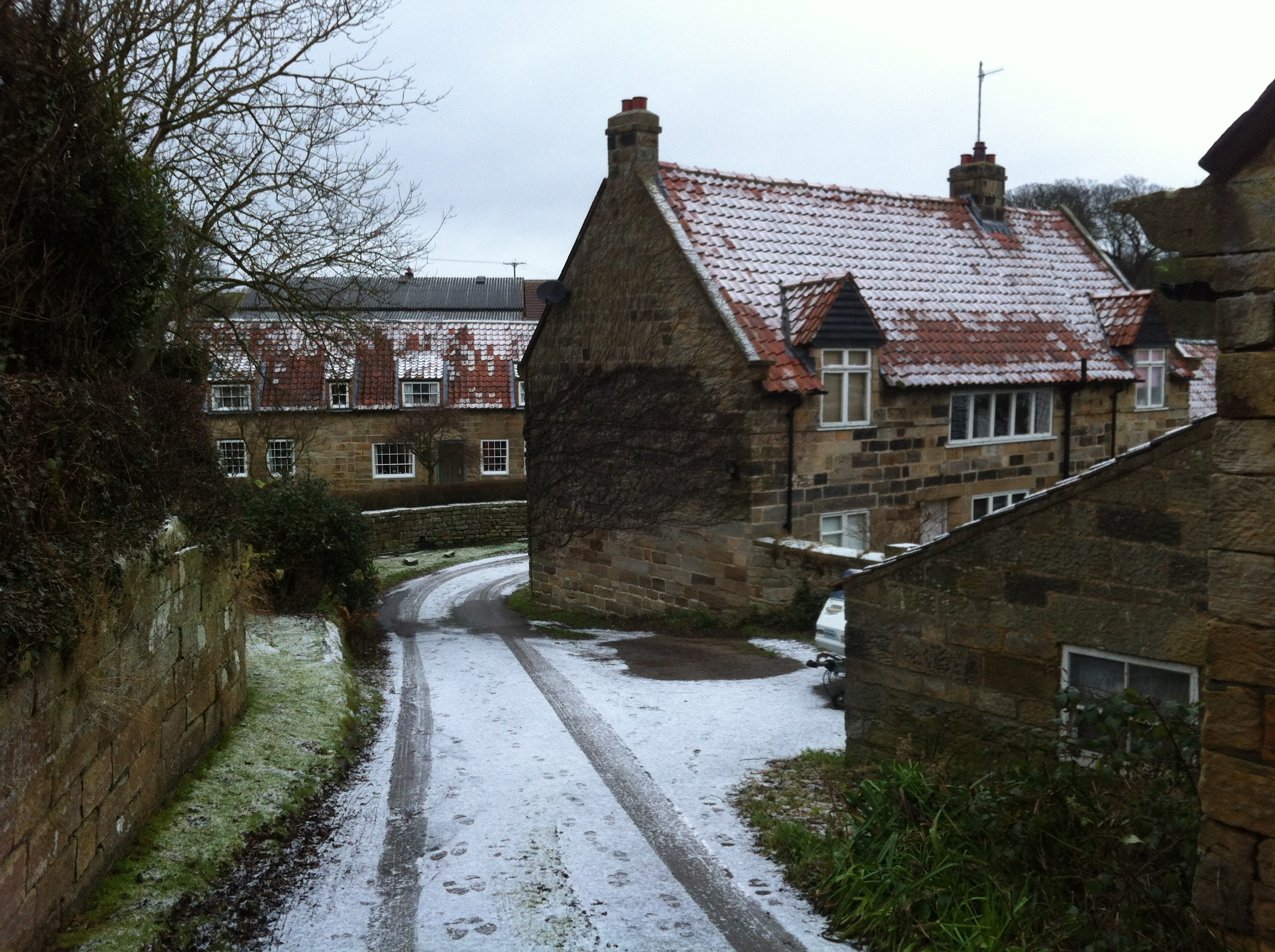
- Ewe Cote

- Location within North Yorkshire
- Population: 11
- OS grid reference: NZ878107
- Civil parish: Whitby
- Unitary authority: North Yorkshire
- Ceremonial county: North Yorkshire
- Region: Yorkshire and the Humber
- Country: England
- Sovereign state: United Kingdom
- Post town: WHITBY
- Postcode district: YO21
- Dialling code: 01947
- Police: North Yorkshire
- Fire: North Yorkshire
- Ambulance: Yorkshire
- UK Parliament: Scarborough and Whitby

Ewe Cote is a small hamlet on the edge of the North York Moors National Park, set in the northern edge of the civil parish of Whitby, in North Yorkshire, England. According to the 2011 UK census, Ewe Cote has a population of 11.

From 1974 to 2023 it was part of the Borough of Scarborough, it is now administered by the unitary North Yorkshire Council.

== Geography ==
The hamlet of Ewe Cote is situated within a small sheltered cirque drainage basin. The bedrock geology is Moor Grit Member (Quartz sandstone) and Glaciofluvial superficial Deposits (Sand and Gravel). The Upgang Beck springs from the cirque and flows via the hamlet down through the Whitby Golf Course onto Upgang Beach.

== History ==
Ewe Cote Hall and the Ewe Cote Hall garden walls, as well as the farmhouse and the outbuildings, both cottages, and the garden wall of one cottage, are all Grade II* listed structures.

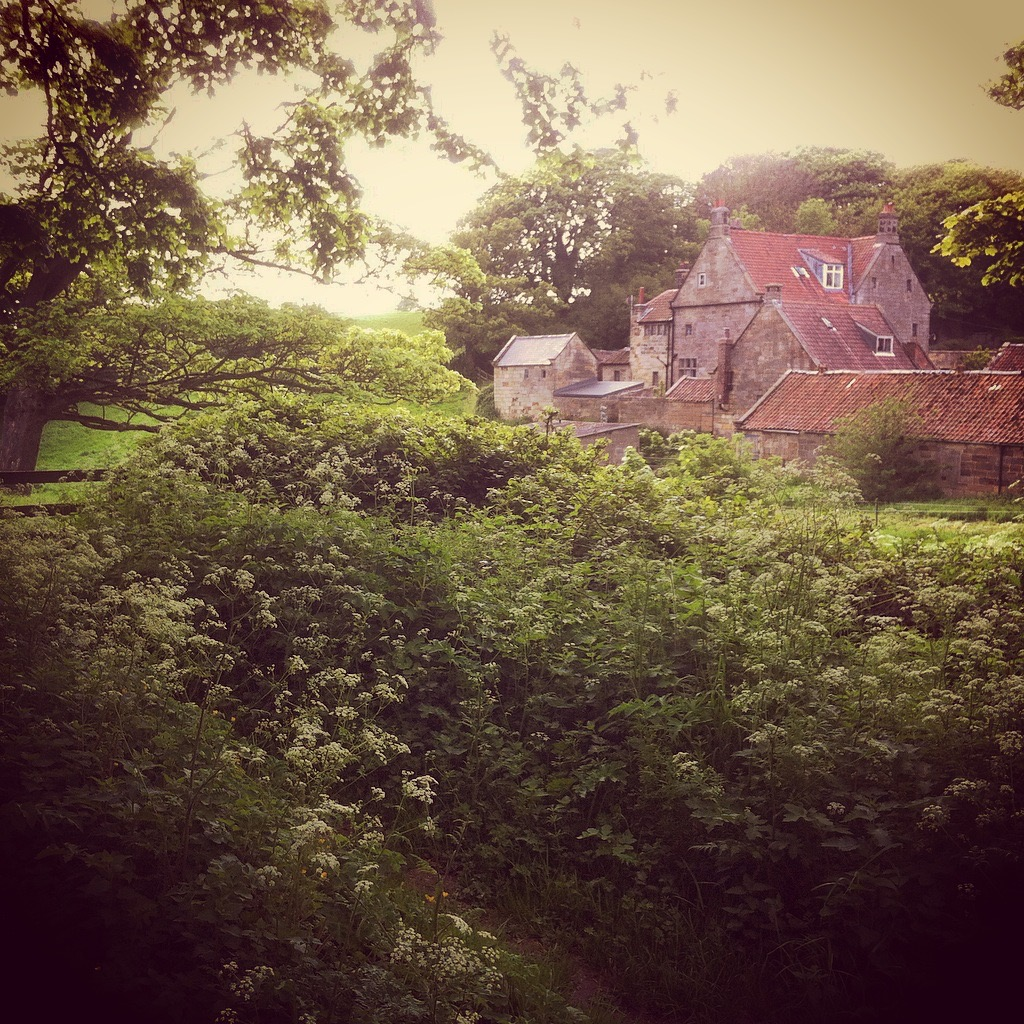
Ewe Cote Hall Farmhouse

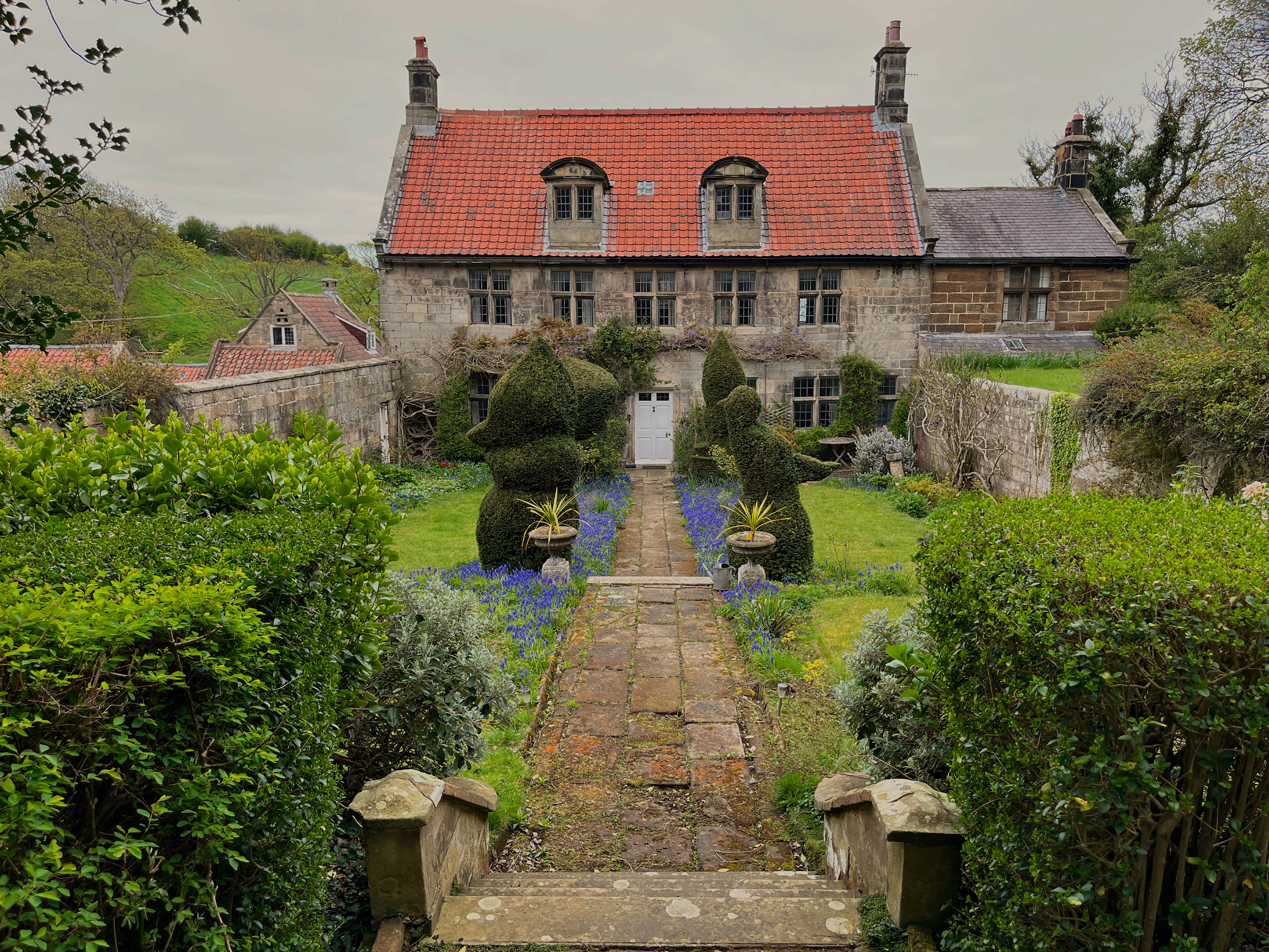
Ewe Cote Hall (2025)

== Notable residents ==
- Francis Meadow (Frank) Sutcliffe (1853-1941): was a pioneering photographer. In the census of 1871, the Sutcliffe's are listed as living at Ewe Cote Hall and Frank is described as a photographer and artist's assistant. Today, Frank Sutcliffe's work is highly acclaimed for his pioneering black and white photographs of working people, bringing worldwide attention to Whitby.

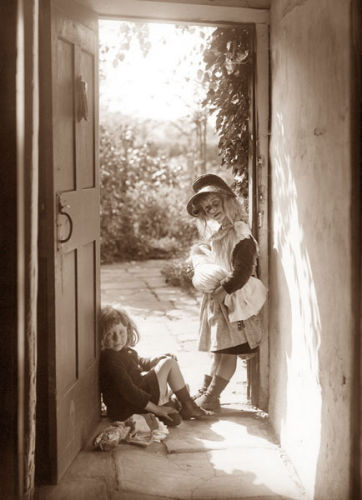
Francis Meadow Sutcliffe - "Sisters" in Ewe Cote

== See also ==
- Listed buildings in Whitby (outer areas)

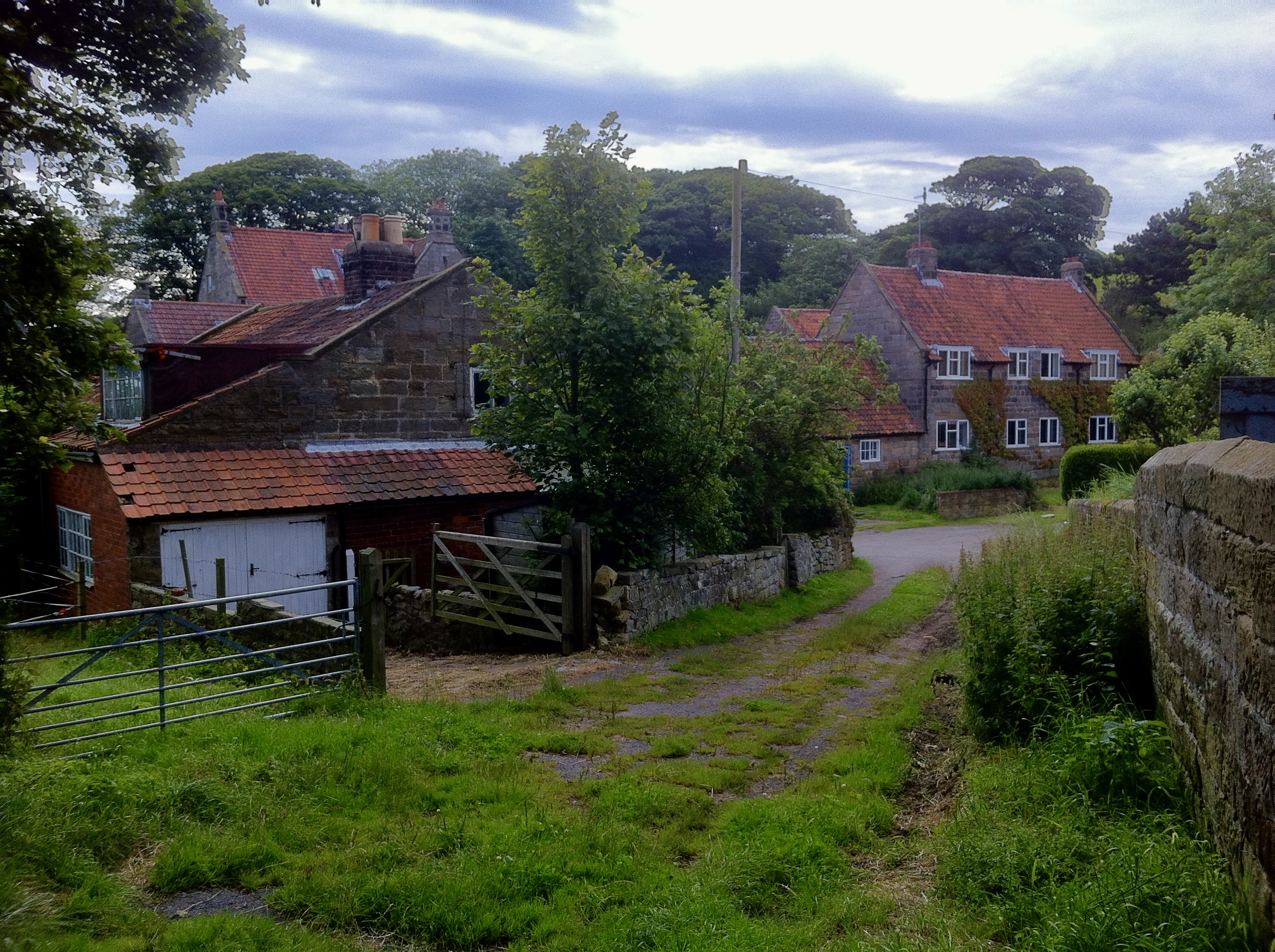
Ewe Cote looking southeast
