= Daisy Lang =

Bulgarian boxer and martial artist

Daisy Lang Дейзи Ланг
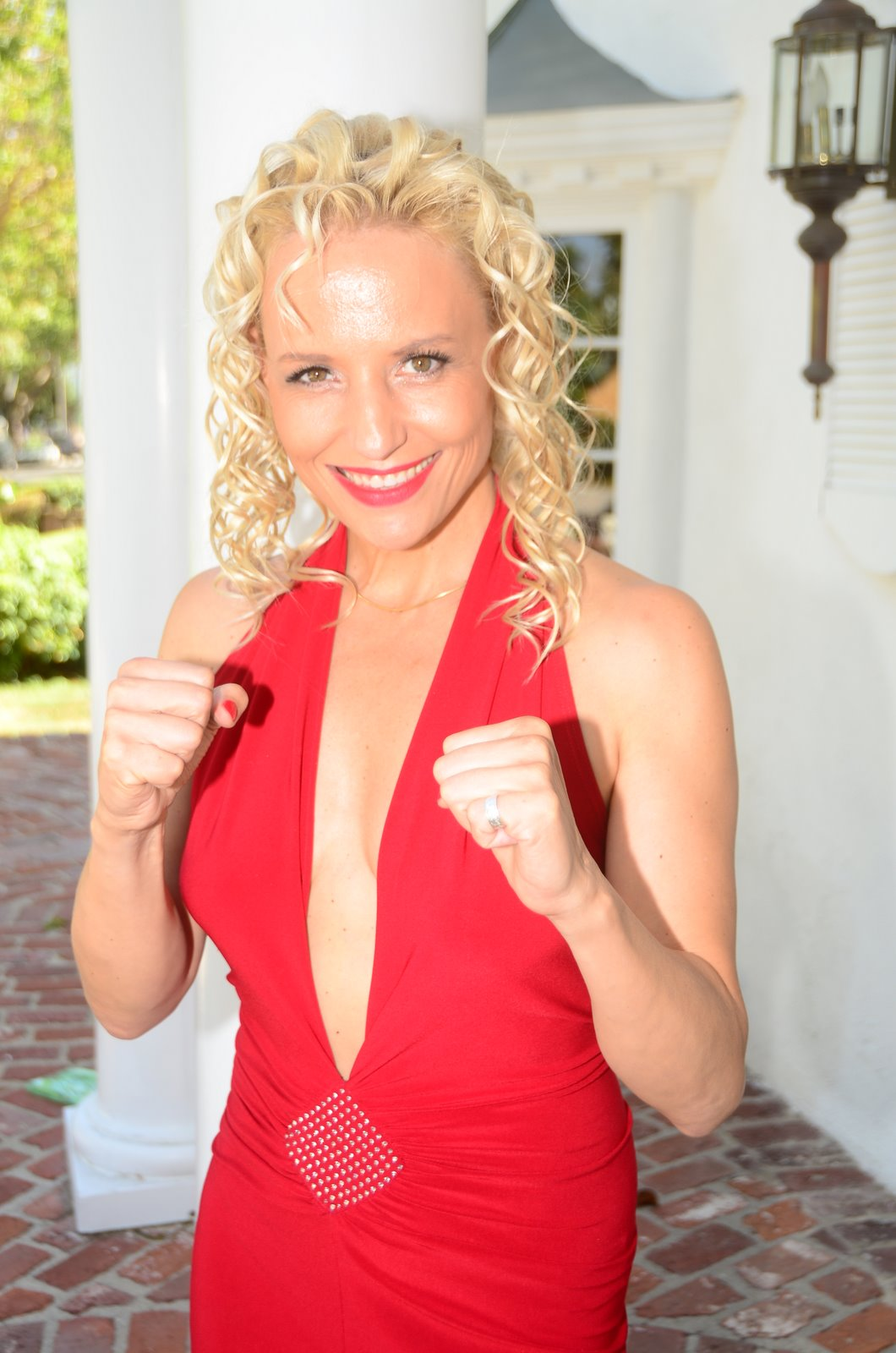
- Lang in 2011

Personal information
- Nickname: The Lady
- Nationality: Bulgarian
- Born: Desislava Kirova; 4 April 1972 (age 54) Sofia, Bulgaria
- Height: 5 ft 7 in (170 cm)
- Weight: Super-flyweight; Bantamweight; Super-bantamweight

Boxing career
- Stance: Orthodox

Boxing record
- Total fights: 23
- Wins: 19
- Win by KO: 7
- Losses: 3
- Draws: 1

Martial Arts
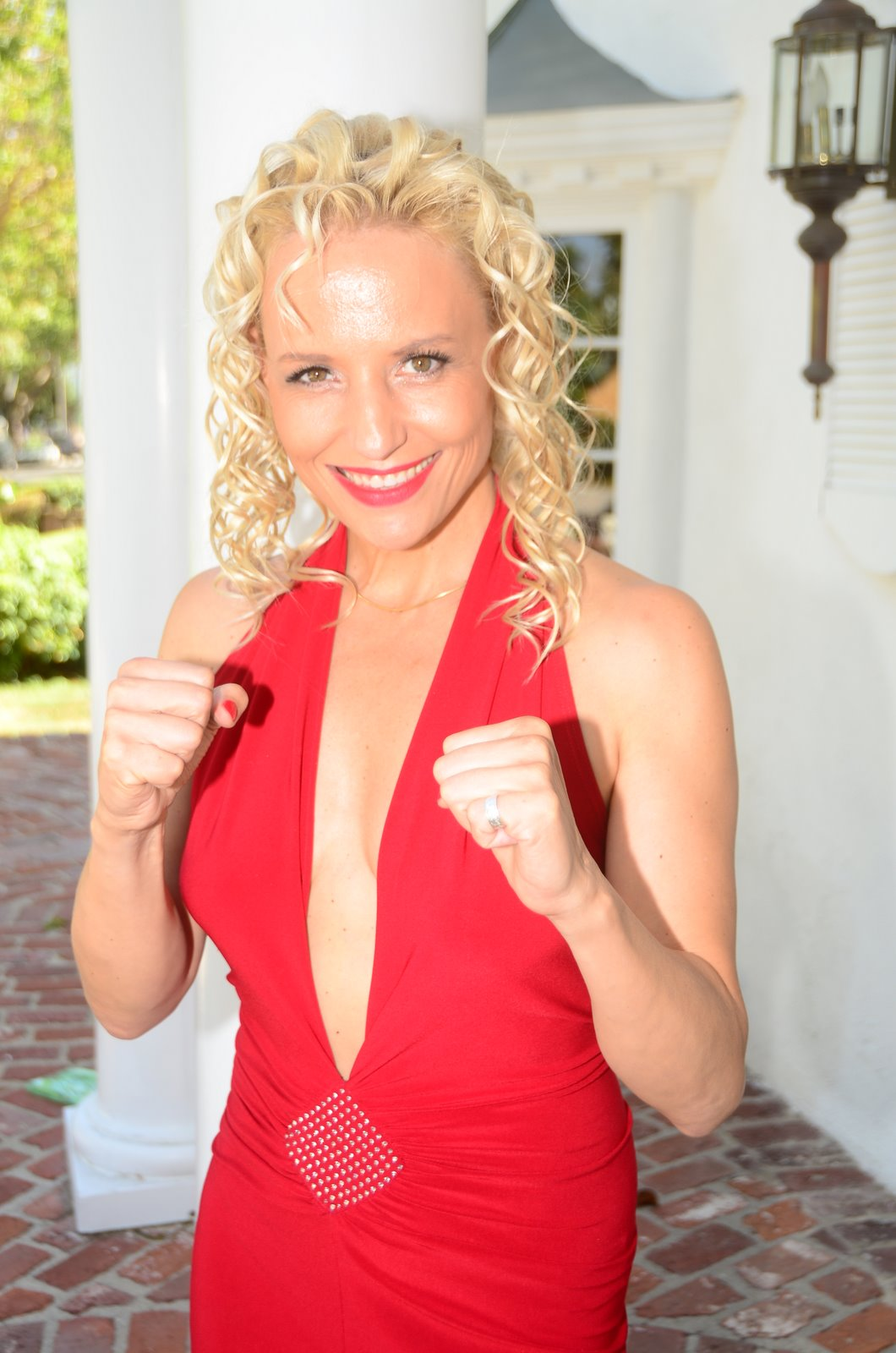
- Style: Taekwondo
- Rank: Black Belt
- Years active: 1994 – present

Other information
- University: German Sport University Cologne
- Notable school: National Sports Academy "Vasil Levski"
- European Taekwondo Champion; World Karate Champion; World kickboxing Champion; European kickboxing Champion

Daisy Lang (Bulgarian: Дейзи Ланг) (born 4 April 1972 as Desislava Kirova (Bulgarian: Десислава Кирова)) is a former professional boxer who competed from 1996 to 2004. She is a three division world champion and was the first Bulgarian woman to capture a world title, having held the WIBF super-flyweight, bantamweight, and super-bantamweight titles between 1999 and 2004.

== Boxing career ==
Lang began boxing professionally in February 1996 in Germany. She lived in Düsseldorf and trained in Hamburg, where Universum Box-Promotion was based, she won her first three fights of her career in 1996, two of them by knockout. On 29 November 1997 Daisy lost against Michele Aboro in the six rounds fight. In February 1998, Daisy Lang won the vacant WIBF European Bantamweight title in ten rounds against Krisztina Horvai.

After winning another fight by knockout in round 2, she defended her European championship belt against Anastasia Toktaulova on 27 March 1999. On 17 July of the same year, Lang became world champion with a victory against Gizella Papp in the battle for the vacant WIBF Super Flyweight title.

From 1999 to 2002 Daisy Lang successfully defended her title against Sonia Pereira, Kathy Williams, Oana Jurma, Brenda Burnside, Nadia Debras, Michelle Sutcliffe and Réka Krempf. On 14 September 2002 she won against Lisa Foster in a fight for the GBU world Bantamweight championship in ten rounds. On 18 January 2003 Lang drew against Silke Weickenmeier in fight for the GBU Super bantamweight title, but won the rematch on 10 May with a majority decision in ten rounds. On 15 November 2003 she lost against Galina Ivanova in ten rounds, in a fight for the WIBF Super Flyweight title.

In 2004, she won an 8-round match against Marian Pampuk of Hungary, but in her next match on 29 May 2004 she lost against Regina Halmich in a fight for the vacant IWBF Super Flyweight title, in ten rounds by unanimous decision. In October 2004 she won another fight by knockout Simone Suchiu in the third round.

== Awards ==
- 2016: Lifetime achievement award from the US Martial Arts Hall of Fame: "Hall of Heroes"
- 2017: The International Women's Boxing Hall of Fame USA (IWBHF)
- 2018, 2019: Hall of Honors Achievements in Martial Arts&Women Pro Boxing, Munich, Germany
- 2019: AMAA Martial Arts Ambassador of the year, Las Vegas, NV
- 2019: Master Hall of Fame Inductee, Costa Mesa, CA
- 2024: Honorary Sign with Ribbon Award, Sofia, Bulgaria
- 2025: IWBHF Lifetime Achievement Special Award, Las Vegas, NV

== Professional boxing record ==
23 fights	19 wins	3 losses
By knockout	7	0
By decision	12	3
Draws	1	

No.	Result	Record	Opponent	Type	Round, time	Date	Location	Notes
23	Win	19–3–1	(Romania) Simone Suciu	TKO	4 (8)	16 Oct 2004	Maritim Hotel, Cologne, Germany	
22	Loss	18–3–1	(Germany) Regina Halmich	UD	10	29 May 2004	Ostseehalle, Kiel, Germany	For vacant IWBF super-flyweight title
21	Win	18–2–1	(Hungary) Mariann Pampuk	PTS	8	2 Mar 2004	Universum Gym, Hamburg, Germany	
20	Loss	17–2–1	(Bulgaria) Galina Koleva Ivanova	UD	10	15 Nov 2003	Oberfrankenhalle, Bayreuth, Germany	For WIBF super-flyweight title
19	Win	17–1–1	(Germany) Silke Weickenmeier	MD	10	10 May 2003	Hanns-Martin-Schleyer-Halle, Stuttgart, Germany	Won WIBF, and GBU super-bantamweight titles
18	Draw	16–1–1	(Germany) Silke Weickenmeier	PTS	10	18 Jan 2003	Grugahalle, Essen, Germany	For WIBF, and GBU super-bantamweight titles
17	Win	16–1	(United States) Lisa Foster	UD	10	14 Sep 2002	Volkswagen Halle, Braunschweig, Germany	Won WIBF, and GBU bantamweight titles
16	Win	15–1	(Hungary) Reka Krempf	UD	10	6 Apr 2002	Universum Gym, Hamburg, Germany	Retained WIBF super-flyweight title
15	Win	14–1	(United Kingdom) Michelle Sutcliffe	TD	7 (10)	29 Sep 2001	Universum Gym, Hamburg, Germany	Retained WIBF super-flyweight title
14	Win	13–1	(France) Nadia Debras	UD	10	27 Jan 2001	Rudi-Sedlmayer-Halle, Munich, Germany	Retained WIBF super-flyweight title
13	Win	12–1	(United States) Brenda Burnside	UD	10	14 Oct 2000	Kölnarena, Cologne, Germany	Retained WIBF super-flyweight title
12	Win	11–1	(Romania) Oana Jurma	TKO	3 (10)	13 May 2000	Sartory Saale, Cologne, Germany	Retained WIBF super-flyweight title
11	Win	10–1	(Canada) Kathy Williams	UD	10	5 Feb 2000	Rhein-Ruhr Halle, Duisburg, Germany	Retained WIBF super-flyweight title
10	Win	9–1	(Portugal) Sonia Pereira	UD	10	23 Oct 1999	Ballsporthalle, Frankfurt, Germany	Retained WIBF super-flyweight title
9	Win	8–1	(Hungary) Gizella Papp	KO	8 (10)	17 Jul 1999	Philips Halle, Düsseldorf, Germany	Won vacant WIBF super-flyweight title
8	Win	7–1	(Russia) Anastasia Toktaulova	UD	10	27 Mar 1999	Sartory-Saal, Cologne, Germany	Retained WIBF European bantamweight title
7	Win	6–1	(Portugal) Sandra Podence	KO	2 (6)	30 Jan 1999	Stadthalle, Cottbus, Germany	
6	Win	5–1	(Hungary) Krisztina Horvai	UD	10	3 Oct 1998	Prinz-Garden Halle, Augsburg, Germany	Won vacant WIBF European bantamweight title
5	Win	4–1	(France) Valerie Rangheard	KO	4	14 Feb 1998	Maritim Hotel, Stuttgart, Germany	
4	Loss	3–1	(United Kingdom) Michele Aboro	PTS	6	29 Nov 1997	Rheinstrandhalle, Karlsruhe, Germany	
3	Win	3–0	Bresda Movotna	KO	3 (6)	29 Aug 1996	Essen, Germany	
2	Win	2–0	(Germany) Nathalie Meiss	PTS	6	6 Jul 1996	Zoo-Gesellschaftshaus, Frankfurt, Germany	
1	Win	1–0	(Russia) Darina Chakolaeva	KO	3	27 Feb 1996	Neuwied, Germany	

== Filmography ==
Film
Year	Title	Role	Notes
2002	Frogmen Operation Stormbringer	Anya	
2006	Undisputed II: Last Man Standing	Svetlana	
2007	Lords of the Underworld	Boxing Trainer	
2007	Missionary Man	Biker Girl	
2009	The Gold & the Beautiful	Reeza	
2015	DELKA: Stand-Up Tall or Fall	Nina	post-production
2017	Ashley and Red	Blue Drop	1 episode
2018	This is Our Christmas	Ntasha Hipsteiner	
