= Ewe Cote Hall =

Historic building in North Yorkshire, England

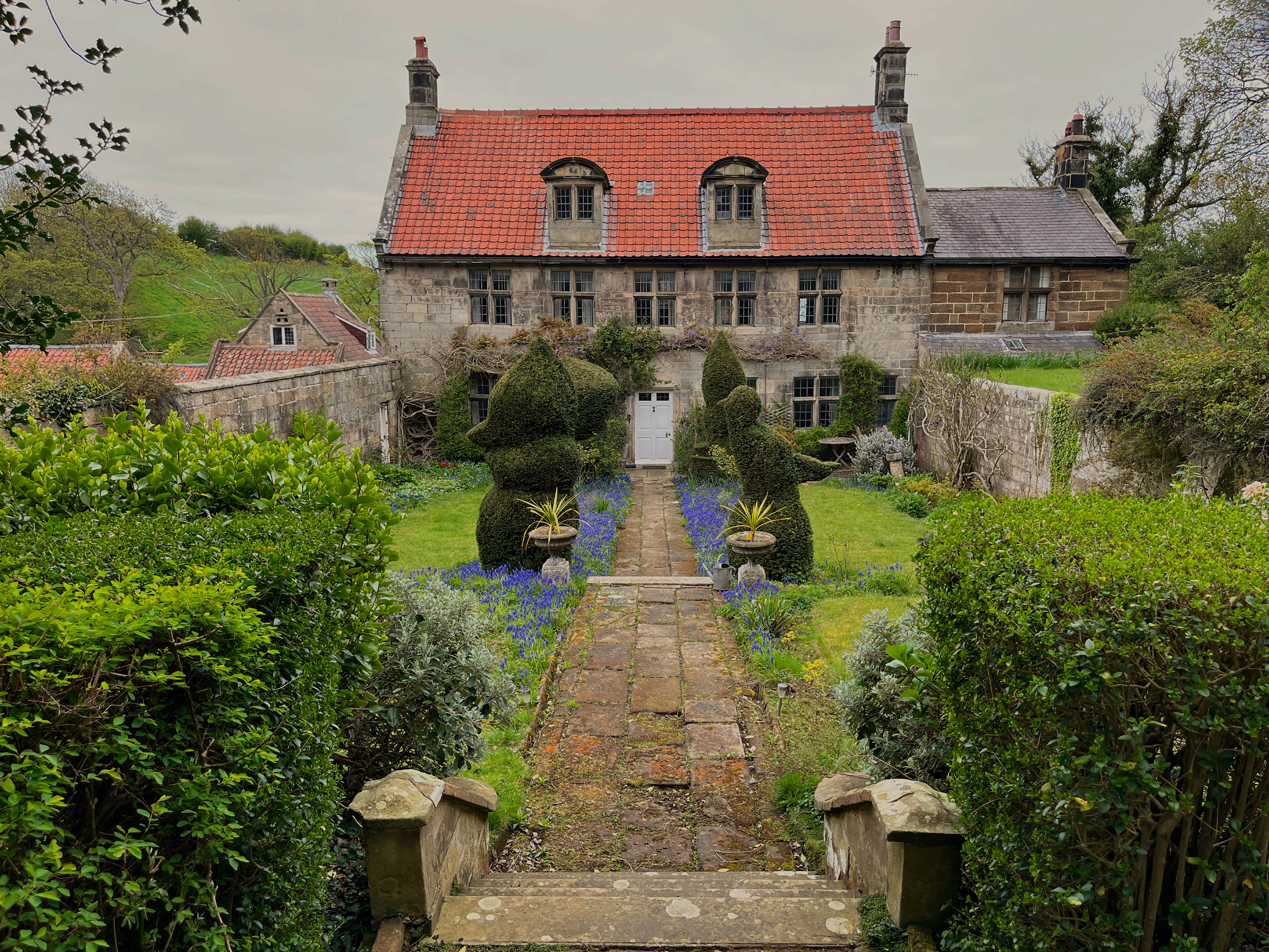
- The house in 2025

- Location within North Yorkshire

General information
- Location: Guisborough Road, Ewe Cote, North Yorkshire, England
- Coordinates: 54°29′05″N 0°38′44″W
- Year built: 1697

Listed Building – Grade II*
- Official name: Ewe Cote Hall
- Designated: 23 February 1954
- Reference no.: 1148252

Listed Building – Grade II*
- Official name: Garden walls to Ewe Cote Hall
- Designated: 23 February 1954
- Reference no.: 1204632

Ewe Cote Hall is a historic building on Guisborough Road in Ewe Cote, a hamlet in North Yorkshire, England.

The house was built in 1697, perhaps on the site of a former grange of Whitby Abbey. Francis Meadow Sutcliffe spent part of his childhood living in the house. The kitchen garden was used by Botham's of Whitby to grow produce, when the shop was first opened. The house was Grade II* listed in 1954. In 2024, it was marketed for sale for £1.35 million, at which time it had five bedrooms and two reception rooms, but was described as "in need of extensive refurbishment".

The house is built of stone with a pantile roof. It has two storeys and attics, and five bays. The doorway is in the centre, and above it are initials and the date. The windows are mullioned and transomed. On the attic are two dormers with mullioned windows and segmental pediments. Inside there are contemporary features, including the staircase, panelling, and fireplaces.

The house and garden are enclosed by a stone wall, built in 1737. This contains two entrances with round arches, a pediment and a ball finial. It is separately Grade II* listed.

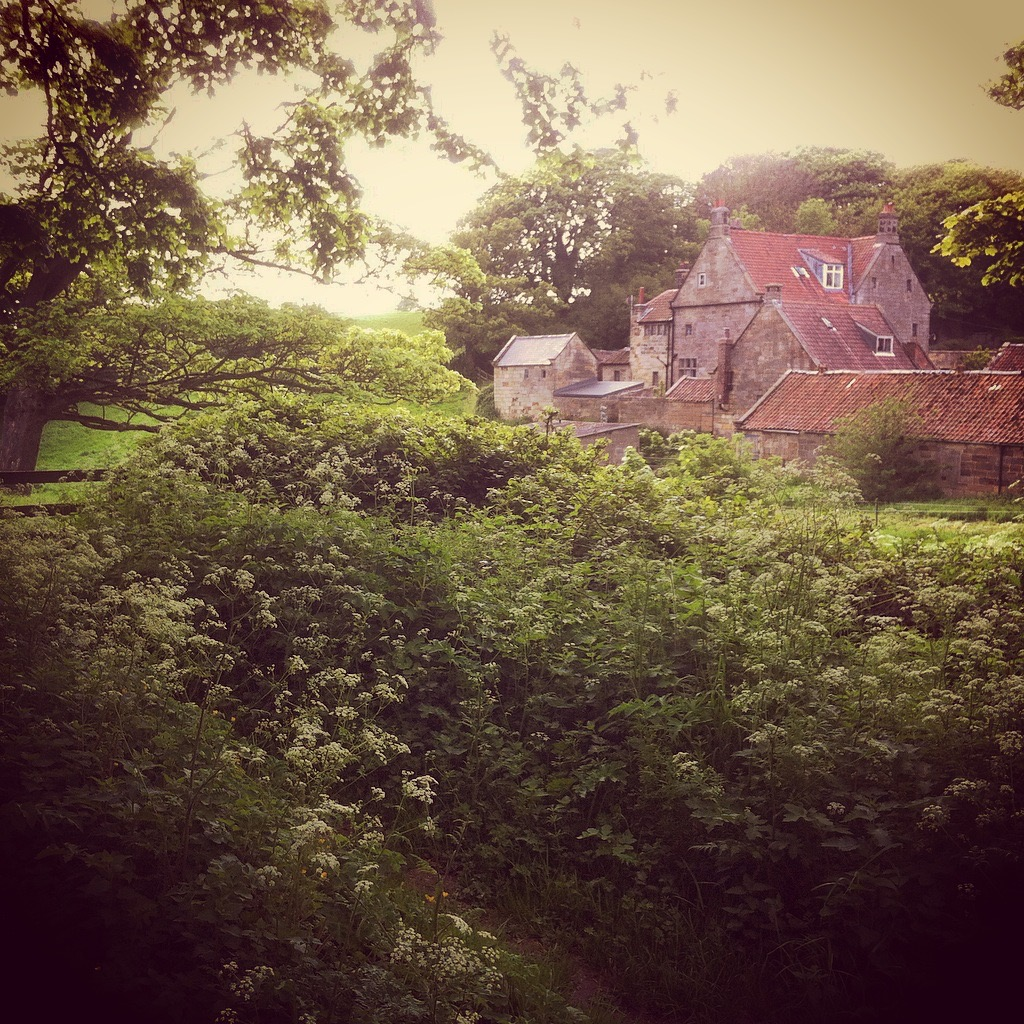
Ewe Cote Hall in 2015

== See also ==
- Grade II* listed buildings in North Yorkshire (district)
- Listed buildings in Whitby (outer areas)
