= Brenda Burnside =

American boxer

Personal information
- Nicknames: Tigress, Tiger
- Nationality: American
- Born: 20 March 1963 (age 63) Albuquerque, New Mexico, United States
- Height: 5 ft 3 in (160 cm)
- Weight: Flyweight Super Flyweight Super Bantamweight

Boxing career
- Stance: Orthodox

Boxing record
- Total fights: 20
- Wins: 7
- Win by KO: 4
- Losses: 11
- Draws: 2
- No contests: 0

Brenda Burnside (born March 20, 1963) is an American former women's boxing "journeywoman". Despite being given such title by boxing fans and critics (a journeyman or woman in boxing is someone who takes fights, usually on short period, and loses to other fighters), she was well known in the boxing world for the quality of opposition she faced; and she contended for a world title once. She fought in the Super Flyweight division.

== Career ==
Burnside began her professional boxing career on August 8, 1997, at the relatively old age (for a boxer) of 32, losing a four-round decision to Gloria Ramirez, in Houston, Texas. Burnside lost her first four fights, but her opposition included Valerie Troike (twice) and future world champion Sandra Yard.

Her first win came on March 12, 1998, when she outpointed Jayla Ortiz over four rounds in Santa Fe. On her next fight, she defeated Dolores Lira.

Burnside began to show a promising future when she dealt Sue Chase a fifth round knockout defeat on June 3 of that year, in the Worley, Idaho. Sixteen days later, she and Gloria Ramirez were rematched, in Coachella, California. Their second bout resulted in a four-round draw.

Burnside went on to win two more fights in a row, when she and Jayla Ortiz were rematched, on October 17, at Las Vegas, Nevada. The second time, Burnside and Ortiz fought to a six-round draw.

On January 23, 1999, Burnside beat former world champion Imelda Arias by a second-round knockout. On March 13, she made her Madison Square Garden debut, dropping an eight-round split decision to Bridgett Riley. On June 16, she lost to future world champion Margaret Sidoroff for the WIBF's intercontinental Super Flyweight title, by a ten-round unanimous decision, in New Orleans, Louisiana. On August 14, she lost to Kathy Williams, but she got a break on her next fight, beating Rosie Johnson by a four-round unanimous decision on November 18. She finished 1999 by dropping another four-round decision, to Kelsey Jeffries, on December 14.

By 2000, Burnside was already contemplating retirement from boxing. Nevertheless, an opportunity to face the well known, two time world champion Para Draine came by, and Burnside accepted it. On February 17, at Worley, she lost to Draine by an eight-round split decision.

Burnside was considering retirement again after this fight, but there still would be one more fight in her career.

She received a world title shot after losing two fights in a row, which is a very unusual circumstance in boxing. With the opportunity of becoming a world champion offered to her, she accepted to fight Daisy Lang in what also was her first and last fight abroad. Fighting for the WIBF's world Super Flyweight championship, Burnside lost a ten-round unanimous decision in Germany and later retired from boxing.

Her boxing record was 7 wins, 11 losses and 2 draws, with 4 knockout wins.

== Professional boxing record ==
20 fights	7 wins	11 losses
By knockout	4	1
By decision	3	10
Draws	2	

No.	Result	Record	Opponent	Type	Round, time	Date	Location	Notes
20	Loss	7–11–2	(Bulgaria) Daisy Lang	UD	10, 2:00	Oct 14, 2000	Kolnarena, Cologne, Germany	WIBF World Super Flyweight Title
19	Loss	7–10–2	(United States) Para Draine	SD	6, 2:00	Feb 17, 2000	Coeur d'Alene Casino, Worley, United States	
18	Loss	7–9–2	(United States) Kelsey Jeffries	UD	4, 2:00	Dec 4, 1999	Chinook Winds Casino, Lincoln City, Nevada, United States	
17	Win	7–8–2	(United States) Rose Johnson	UD	4, 2:00	Nov 18, 1999	Gold Strike Casino, Tunica, United States	
16	Loss	6–8–2	(Canada) Kathy Williams	UD	10, 2:00	Aug 14, 1999	Buffalo Chip Campground, Sturgis, South Dakota, United States	
15	Loss	6–7–2	(Canada) Margaret Sidoroff	UD	10, 2:00	Jun 16, 1999	New Orleans, Louisiana, United States	WIBF Intercontinental Super Flyweight Title
14	Loss	6–6–2	(United States) Bridgett Riley	MD	6, 2:00	Mar 13, 1999	Madison Square Garden, New York City, New York, United States	
13	Win	6–5–2	(Mexico) Imelda Arias	TKO	2, 1:11	Jan 23, 1999	Convention Center, Ruidoso, United States	
12	Loss	5–5–2	(United States) Mary Ortega	UD	6, 2:00	Nov 12, 1998	Market Center, Kansas City, United States	
11	Draw	5–4–2	(United States) Jayla Ortiz	PTS	6, 2:00	Oct 17, 1998	Arizona Charlie's, Las Vegas, Nevada, United States	
10	Win	5–4–1	(Mexico) Coptizi Mendivil	TKO	4	Sep 19, 1998	Arizona Charlie's, Las Vegas, Nevada, United States	
9	Win	4–4–1	(Mexico) Karina Hernandez	KO	4, 0:50	Aug 15, 1998	Arizona Charlie's, Las Vegas, Nevada, United States	
8	Draw	3–4–1	(United States) Gloria Ramirez	PTS	4, 2:00	Jun 19, 1998	Spotlight 29 Casino, Coachella, United States	
7	Win	3–4	(United States) Sue Chase	TKO	5, 1:59	Jun 3, 1998	Coeur d'Alene Casino, Worley, United States	
6	Win	2–4	(United States) Dolores Liza	UD	4, 2:00	Apr 18, 1998	Arizona Charlie's, Las Vegas, Nevada, United States	
5	Win	1–4	(United States) Jayla Ortiz	SD	4, 2:00	Mar 12, 1998	Convention Center, Santa Fe, New Mexico, United States	
4	Loss	0–4	(United States) Sandra Yard	TKO	4, 0:46	Feb 6, 1998	Arizona Charlie's, Las Vegas, Nevada, United States	
3	Loss	0–3	(United States) Valerie Troike	UD	4, 2:00	Nov 26, 1997	Arizona Charlie's, Las Vegas, Nevada, United States	
2	Loss	0–2	(United States) Valerie Troike	UD	4, 2:00	Oct 22, 1997	Arizona Charlie's, Las Vegas, Nevada, United States	
1	Loss	0–1	(United States) Gloria Ramirez	UD	4, 2:00	Aug 8, 1997	Sky Lite Event Center, Denver, Colorado, United States	

== See also ==
- List of female boxers
