= Thomas Sutcliffe =

Thomas or Tom Sutcliffe may refer to:

- Thomas Sutcliffe (artist) (1828–1871), English painter
- Thomas Sutcliffe (soldier) (died 1849), British adventurer and author of works on Chile and Peru
- Tom Sutcliffe (politician) (1865–1931), English Member of Parliament
- Tom Sutcliffe (opera critic) (born 1943), English opera critic and author
- Tom Sutcliffe (broadcaster) (born 1956), British arts journalist and broadcaster

== See also ==
- Thomas Sutcliffe Mort (1816–1878), Australian industrialist
