= Thomas Sutcliffe (artist) =

English painter

Thomas Sutcliffe (1828 – 11 December 1871) was an English watercolour painter.

Sutcliffe was born and lived most of his life in the Leeds area, particularly Headingley. He married Sarah Lorentia Button, and they had a large family, including his eldest son, the photographer Francis Meadow Sutcliffe.

He was self-taught, but was elected to the Institute of Water-Colour Painters and was a frequent exhibitor at the Royal Academy. He was said to excel at landscapes but also painted figures well, and tended to the Pre-Raphaelite school. His works included a set of over 50 featuring the Yorkshire coast from Hull to Redcar.

He died of heart disease on 11 December 1871 in Whitby.
