= Michelle Sutcliffe =

British boxer

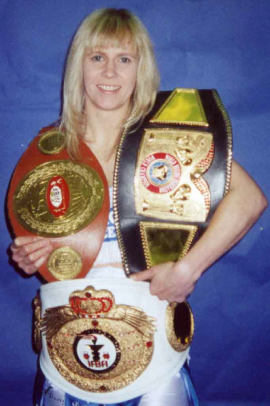
- Sutcliffe in 2001
- Born: February 3, 1967 (age 59); Leeds, England
- Nationality: English
- Height: 5 ft 4 in (1.63 m)
- Weight: 112 lb (51 kg; 8.0 st)
- Reach: 67.0 in (170 cm)
- Style: Muay Thai, Kickboxing, Boxing

Professional boxing record
- Total: 12
- Wins: 7
- By knockout: 2
- Losses: 5

Kickboxing record
- Total: 9
- Wins: 9
- By knockout: 3

Other information
- Boxing record from BoxRec

Michelle Sutcliffe (born 3 February 1967) is an English female boxer who competed in the Light Flyweight division.

On 27 February 2000, she became the first Leeds-based boxer, professionally licensed under the British Boxing Board of Control (BBBofC), to become a world professional boxing champion. In 1999 she was awarded the BBC's sportswoman of the year at the BBC in the North Sports Awards.

Michelle was the second woman to be granted a professional boxers license by the BBBofC the first woman being Jane Couch.

Michelle also practised Kickboxing and the martial arts sport of Muay Thai.

== Professional career ==
Sutcliffe's professional boxing career began on November 2, 1996, with her first world title try, as she challenged Regina Halmich for the WIBF's world Flyweight title, despite having never previously taken part in competition on this level; she ultimately lost in a second-round technical knockout.

On June 24, 1998, Sutcliffe met Para Draine in Atlantic City for her second bout, losing by technical knockout in round five.

Her first win came against Diane Berry on June 28 of that year, when she defeated Berry by decision in five rounds back home in England.

On February 12, 1999, she lost to Sengul Ozokcu by a six-round decision in Denmark, following that defeat with two wins in a row. Sutcliffe then fought Belgian champion Veerle Braspennings for the vacant Intercontinental WIBF title at the Armouries in Leeds, winning by technical knockout in round 7.

On Sunday 26 September 1999 Sutcliffe won the World International Boxing Federation flyweight title. The match was held at the Royal Armouries museum in Leeds. It was between Michelle Sutcliffe and Veerle Braspenningx who Sutcliffe beat after 7 rounds.

Sutcliffe's ascent to boxing fame culminated with a glorious bout against Francesca Lupo at the Leeds Town Hall on February 27, 2000; entering the match, Lupo was the far more experienced fighter, having recently become the Italian champion and World Number One for the vacant WBF (World Boxing Federation) World Title flyweight crown. Sutcliffe was declared the victor by unanimous decision after ten rounds, making history as the first Leeds-based professionally licensed boxer under the BBBofC to become a World professional boxing champion.

On October 7, 2000, Michelle and Halmich were rematched in Berlin, with the WIBF's world Flyweight championship on the line once again. Sutcliffe entered the match with the aim of making a bold statement, and while the fight proved much more competitive than their first match, Sutcliffe ultimately lost a very close ten-round decision on points. Her next fight, against Kim Messer in South Korea, also ended in a loss by points decision in ten rounds. Sutcliffe followed these losses by winning the IFBA World Title crown at the Irish Center in Leeds on May 17, 2001, knocking out Bulgarian champion Maria Ivanova in round 5.

After the knockout win, Sutcliffe moved up one weight division and challenged Daisy Lang for Lang's WIBF World Jr. bantamweight title on October 29, 2001, in Germany. Sutcliffe lost in a seven-round technical decision when the fight's referee dictated that a cut suffered by Lang had been produced by a headbutt; the bout's result proved to be controversial, as many ringside and television viewers thought they had seen a right-hand punch by Sutcliffe causing Lang's cut.

Following the contentious loss, Sutcliffe retired from professional boxing as a three-time World champion. Reflecting on her career, Sutcliffe stated:

It was very hard in the beginning, as I had to fight women from other nations with much greater opportunities for professional boxing than in the UK. Many of the women at the time had vast experience compared to me. But I never gave up, and it paid off in the end, achieving my dream World title in Leeds.

Her record stands at 7 wins and 5 losses, with 2 knockout wins.

== Post-professional career ==
Michelle now teaches classes and 1-2-1 sessions at Tigers Gym in Meanwood, Leeds.

== Legacy ==
Sutcliffe and Germany's Regina Halmich have helped to increase the popularity of women's boxing in Europe.

Sutcliffe's name is one of those featured on the sculpture Ribbons, unveiled in 2024.

== Professional boxing record ==
14 fights	9 wins	5 losses
By knockout	2	0
By decision	7	5

No.	Result	Record	Opponent	Type	Round, time	Date	Location	Notes
12	Loss		Daisy Lang	TD		2001-09-29	Universum Gym, Wandsbek	Women's International Boxing Federation World Super Flyweight Title
11	Loss		Marietta Ivanova	TKO		2001-05-17	Irish Centre, Leeds	
10	Loss		Kim Messer	MD		2000-11-19	Central City Millenium Hall, Seoul	
9	Loss		Regina Halmich	MD		2000-10-07	Estrel Convention Center, Berlin-Neukölln	Women's International Boxing Federation World Light Flyweight Title
8	Win		Jan Wild	UD		2000-05-15	Winter Gardens, Cleethorpes	
7	Win		Francesca Lupo	PTS		2000-02-27	Leeds	
6	Win		Veerle Braspenningx	TKO		1999-09-27	Royal Armouries Museum, Leeds	
5	Loss		Sengul Ozokcu	PTS		1999-02-12	Falconer Centeret, Frederiksberg	
4	Win		Diane Berry	UD		1998-06-28	Warrington, England	
3	Loss		Para Draine	TKO		1998-05-24	Tropicana Hotel & Casino, Atlantic City	
2	Win		Jane Knapton	PTS		1998-04-04		
1	Loss		Regina Halmich	TKO		1996-11-02	Olympia Eisstadion, Garmisch-Partenkirchen	Women's International Boxing Federation World Flyweight Title
