= John Sutcliffe =

John Sutcliffe may refer to:

- John B. Sutcliffe (1853–1913), English and American architect
- John Willie Sutcliffe (1868–1947), association (soccer), and rugby union footballer
- John Sutcliffe (umpire) (born 1944), Australian football umpire
- John Sutcliffe (footballer) (1913–1980), English footballer
- John Sutcliffe (designer) (1913–1987), British fetish clothing designer and fetish magazine publisher
- John Sutcliffe (British politician) (born 1931), British Conservative Party politician, MP 1970–1974
