= Peter Sutcliffe (disambiguation) =

Peter Sutcliffe (1946–2020) was an English serial killer.

Peter Sutcliffe may also refer to:

- Peter Sutcliffe (racing driver) (born 1936), British textile manufacturer and race driver
- Peter Sutcliffe (footballer) (born 1957), English footballer
- Pete Sutcliffe, guitarist for Boss in 1979

== Fictional characters ==
- Pete Sutcliffe, a character in Gavin & Stacey
