= Francis Meadow Sutcliffe =

British photographer

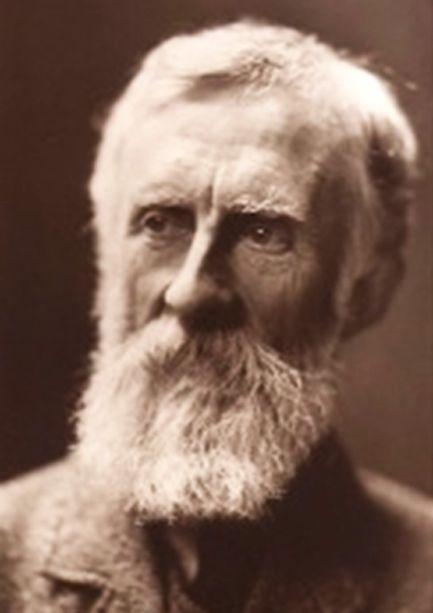
- Born: 6 October 1853; Headingley, Leeds, England
- Died: 31 May 1941 (aged 87)
- Occupation: Photographer
- Known for: "Water Rats"

Francis Meadow (Frank) Sutcliffe (6 October 1853 – 31 May 1941) was an English pioneering photographic artist whose work presented an enduring record of life in the seaside town of Whitby, England, and surrounding areas, in the late Victorian era and early 20th century. His documentation of the Victorian and Edwardian periods in Whitby led him to be labelled as the "pictorial Boswell of Whitby.

== Early life ==
He was born in Headingley, Leeds, to the painter Thomas Sutcliffe and Sarah Lorentia Button. Frank was the eldest of eight children, and as a child, he slept in his father's studio. He had an elementary education at a dame school before moving into the new technology of photography. His father moved the family to Ewe Cote Hall near Whitby in 1870 with the hope of commissions. He died a year later when Francis was 18, leaving him as head of the family.

== Career ==
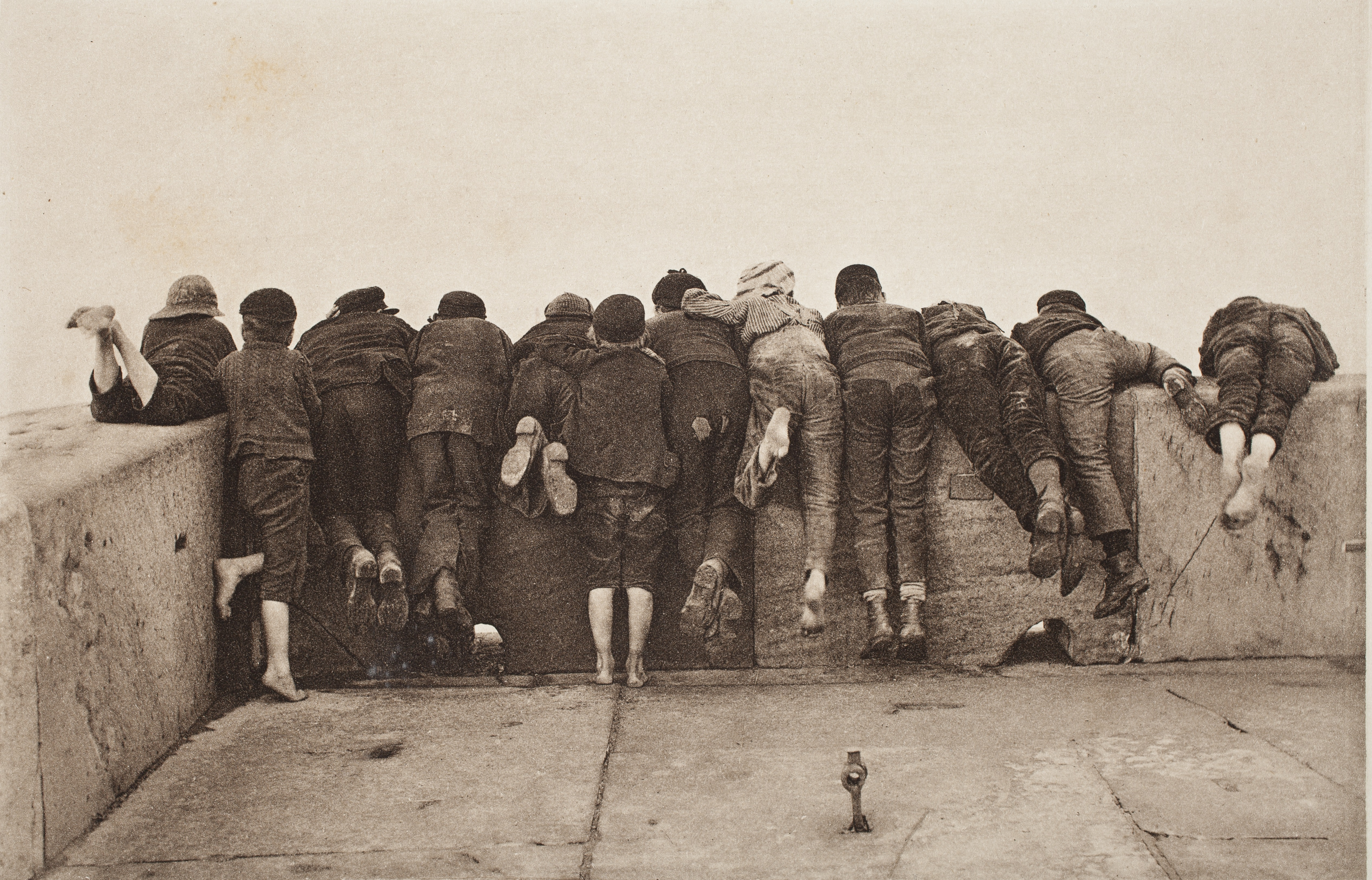
"Stern Realities", a photograph Sutcliffe took circa 1890 in England.

He made a living as a portrait photographer, working first in Tunbridge Wells, Kent, and then for the rest of his life in Whitby, living in Broomfield Terrace in Whitby before moving to Sleights, Yorkshire. His father had brought him into contact with prominent figures in the world of art such as John Ruskin, and he resented having to prostitute his art taking photographs of holiday-makers. His business in Skinner Street, a converted jet grinding and polishing works, rooted him to Whitby and the Eskdale valley but, by photographing the ordinary people that he knew well, he built up a most complete and revealing picture of a late Victorian town, and the people who lived and worked there.

His most famous photograph was taken in 1886; Water Rats caused a little comment at the time as it featured naked children playing in a boat, but the image is not erotic. Sutcliffe was using the conventions of the academic nude to show how photography can approach art. He was, however, excommunicated by his local clergy for displaying it, as they thought it would 'corrupt' the opposite sex. Edward VII (then the Prince of Wales) later purchased a copy of the picture.

He was a prolific writer on photographic subjects, contributed to several periodicals, and wrote a regular column in the Yorkshire Weekly Post. His work is in the collection of the Whitby Literary and Philosophical Society and in other national collections.

Sutcliffe was a founder member of the Linked Ring Brotherhood (a society that existed to promote photography as an art form), and was made an Honorary Fellow of the Royal Photographic Society in 1941.

At the age of 70, he became the curator of the Whitby Gallery and Museum, he held this post until his death in 1941 at the age of 87.

== Personal life ==
He married Eliza Weatherill Duck, the daughter of a local bootmaker, on 1 January 1875 and had a son and four daughters at his home at High Stakesby Cottages, Ruswarp parish, Whitby. He died at his house Hvid(e)t Huus, Carr Lane, Briggswath, Sleights, aged 87, on 31 May 1941 and was buried in Aislaby churchyard.

== Gallery ==
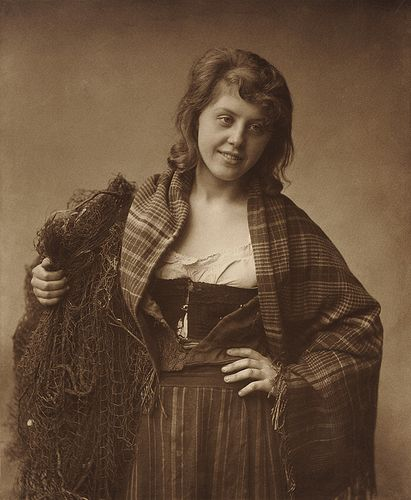
Portrait of Polly Swallow, 1889

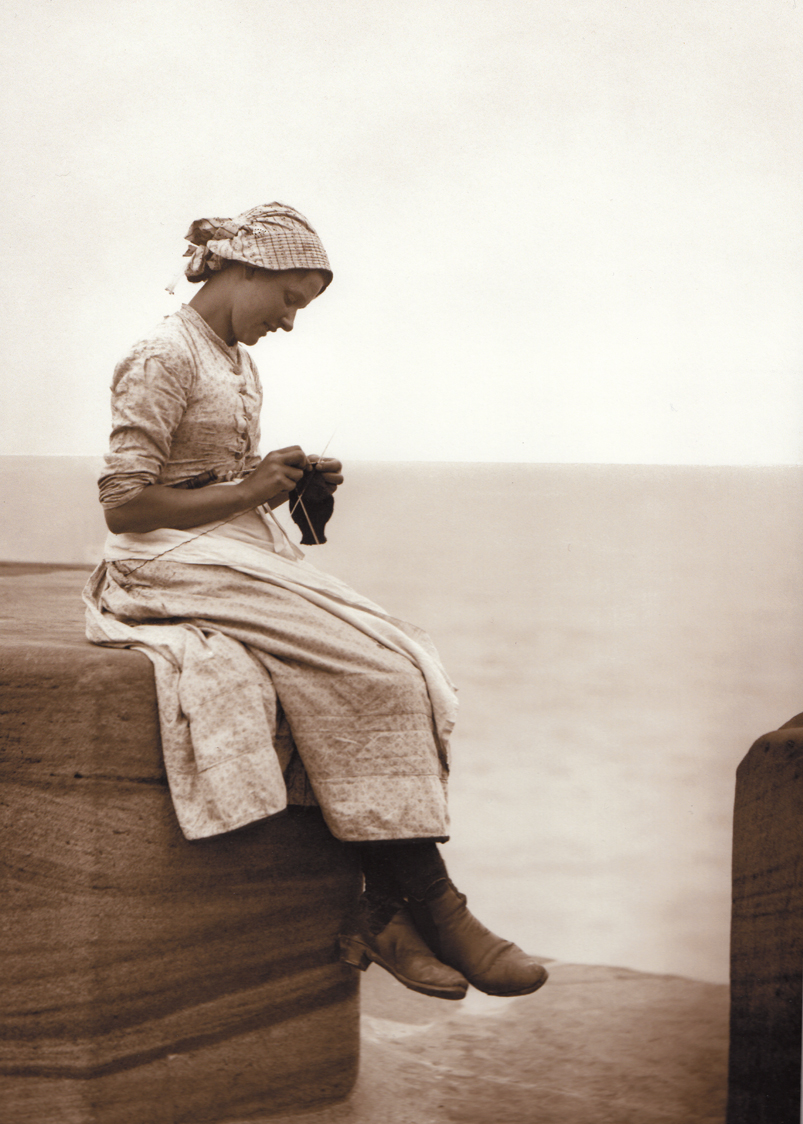
Girl on the shore, 1889

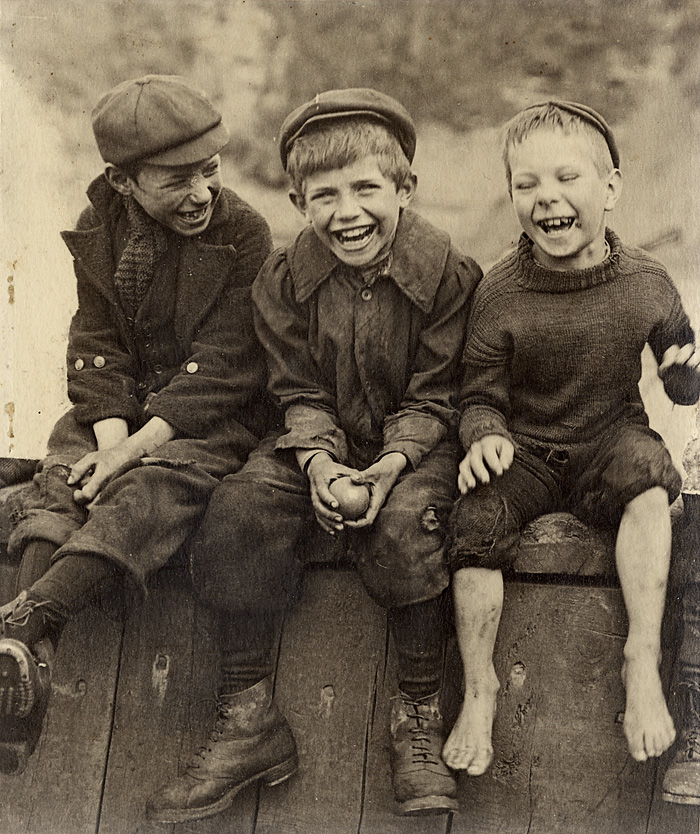
Three happy boys, 1889

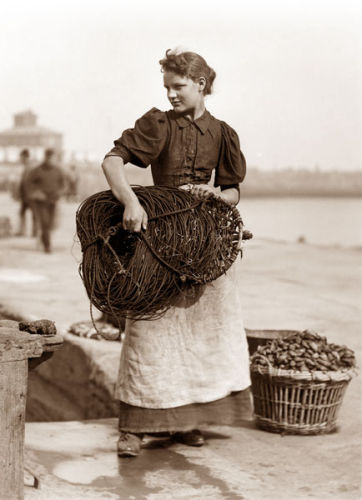
Fisher girl, 1890

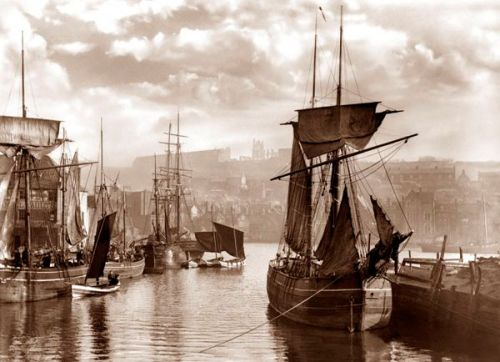
Whitby, 1890

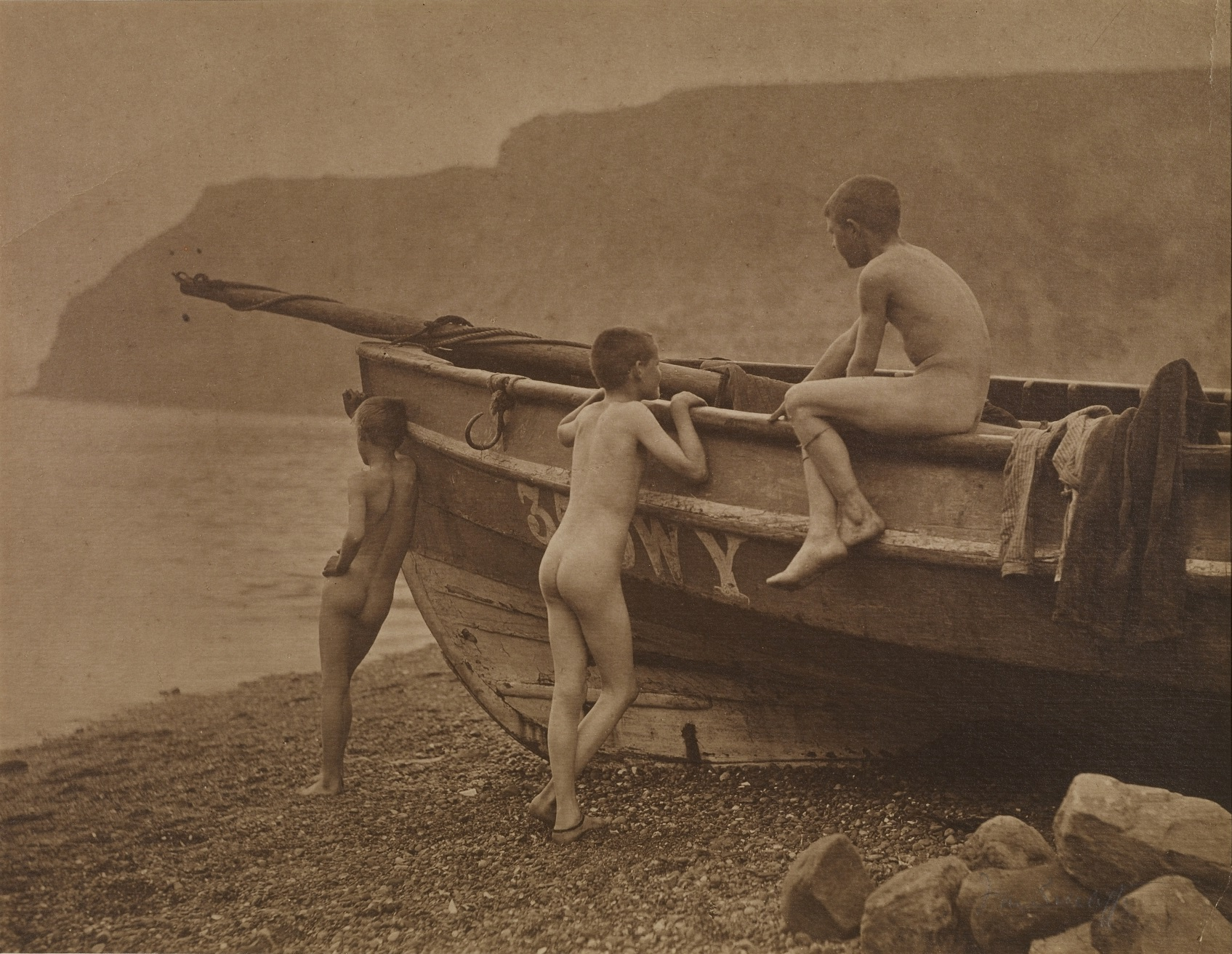
Three Naked Boys Around a Coble, 1880s

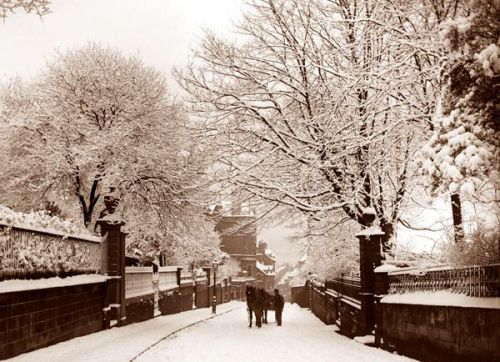
Whitby winter

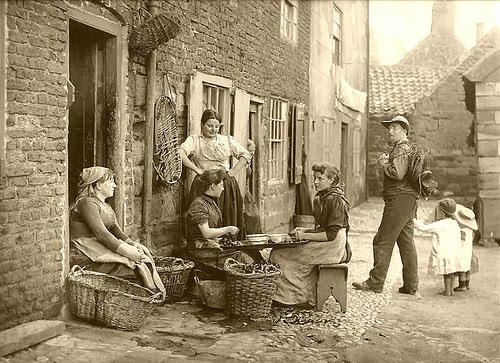
Whitby, 1890

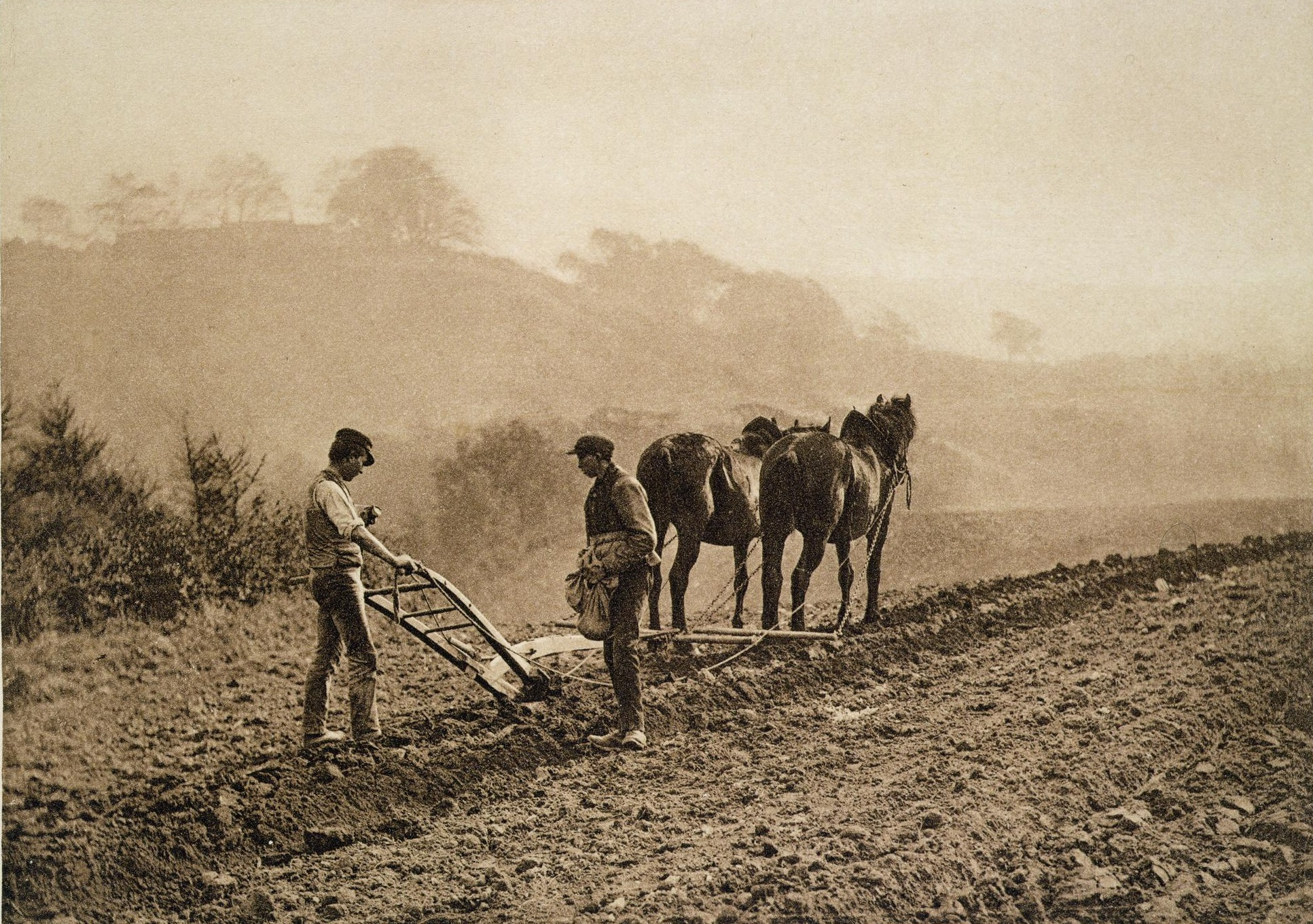
Farmers Whitby / Dinner Time, c. 1889-91

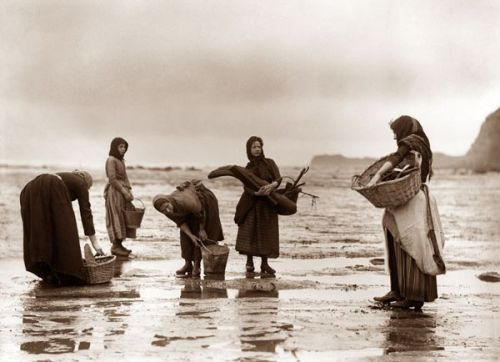
Whitby, 1890

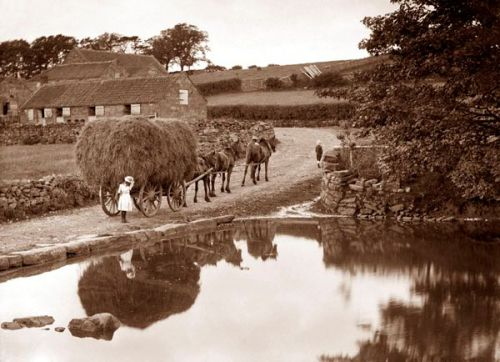
Farmer people Whitby

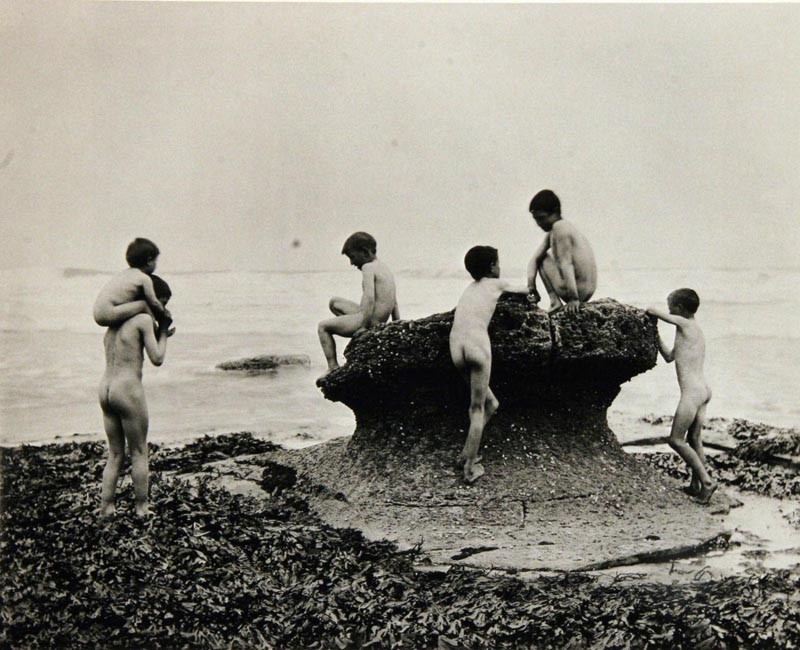
Waterrats, (Sea Urchins), 1886

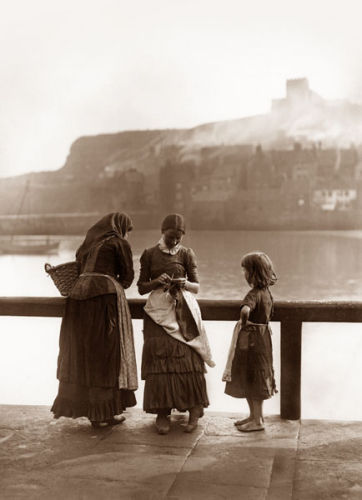
Women, c.1890

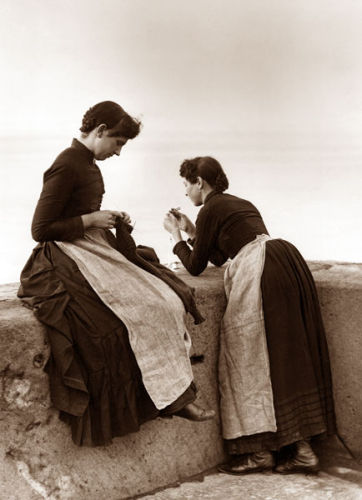
Women, c.1890

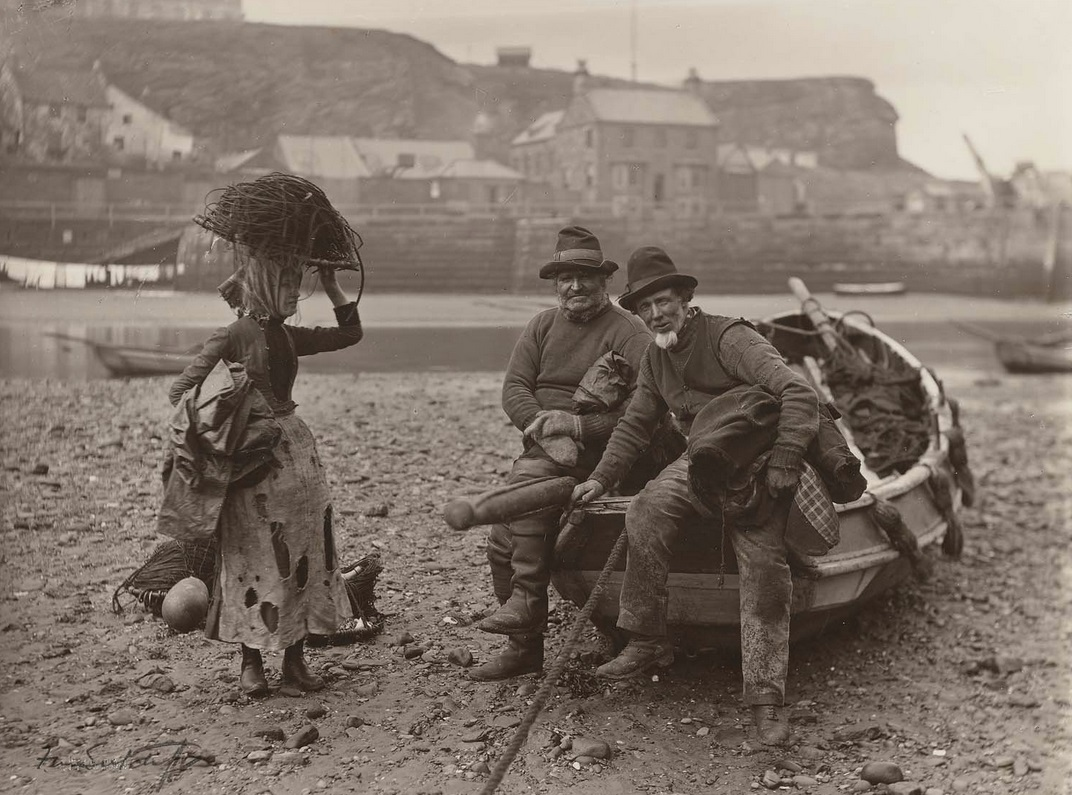
Fisher people, c. 1898
