= 2026 Birthday Honours =

Appointments made by King Charles III

The 2026 King's Birthday and Operational Honours are appointments by some of the 15 Commonwealth realms of King Charles III to various orders and honours to reward and highlight good works by citizens of those countries. The Birthday Honours are awarded as part of the King's Official Birthday celebrations during the month of June.

The King appoints members to the orders upon the advice of his ministers. However, the Order of the Garter, the Order of the Thistle, the Order of Merit and the Royal Victorian Order are bestowed solely by the Sovereign.

== United Kingdom ==
Below are the individuals appointed by King Charles III in his right as King of the United Kingdom with honours within his own gift, and with the advice of the Government for other honours.

=== Order of the Companions of Honour ===
Order of the Companions of Honour ribbon

==== Member of the Order of Companions of Honour (CH) ====
- Sir Donald McCullin CBE, Photojournalist. For services to Photojournalism.
- Dame Helen Lydia Mirren DBE, Actor. For services to Drama.

=== Knight Bachelor ===
Knight Bachelor ribbon

- Professor Glen Warren Burley, Chief Executive, The Foundation Group and Deputy Chief Executive, NHS England. For services to the NHS
- Professor Carlos Silvestre Frenk, CBE FRS Ogden Professor of Fundamental Physics, Durham University. For services to Astrophysics and Cosmology
- The Right Honourable David Michael Gauke, Chair of the Independent Sentencing Review. For services to the Justice System
- The Right Honourable Gregory William Hands, lately Member of Parliament for Chelsea and Fulham. For Parliamentary and Political Service
- Alastair John Naisbitt King, DL, lately Lord Mayor, City of London Corporation. For services to Pensions Reform, to the Promotion of International Business and Voluntary and Charitable Service
- Peter Duncan Fraser Lord, CBE, Co-Founder and Creative Director, Aardman Animations. For services to the Animation Industry, the Creative Industries and to Charity
- Professor Richard Brabazon Macrory, CBE KC (Hon), lately Board Member, The Office for Environmental Protection. For services to environmental Law
- Andrew Harold Mitchell, CBE FREng, Chief Executive Officer, Tideway. For services to the Construction Industry
- Professor Andrew David Morris, CBE FRSE FMedSci, Director of Health Data Research UK and Vice-Principal, University of Edinburgh. For services to Medical Sciences, to Public Health and to Patient Care
- Christopher John Mullin. For Political and Public Service
- Stephen Thurston Munby, CBE, Visiting Professor, University College London. For services to Education
- Kevin Sinfield, CBE, Coach, England National Rugby Union Team and Fundraiser. For services to Rugby League, Rugby Union and the MND Community
- David Alan Sproxton, CBE, Co-Founder and Trustee, Aardman Animations. For services to the Animation Industry, the Creative Industries and to Charity
- Patrick Phillip Vernon, OBE, Campaigner for Racial Equality and Social Justice. For services to Racial Equality

=== Most Honourable Order of the Bath ===
Order of the Bath ribbon

==== Knight/Dame Commander of the Order of the Bath (KCB / DCB) ====
Civil

- Susanna Justine McGibbon, KC (Hon), lately HM Procurator General, Treasury Solicitor and Permanent Secretary, Government Legal Department. For Public Service.
- Simon Peter Burton, Clerk of the Parliaments, House of Lords. For services to Parliament.

==== Companion of the Order of the Bath (CB) ====
Military

- Rear Admiral Robert Alexander Lauchlan, Royal Navy, C033450Y.
- Major General Paul Patrick Lynch, MC, Royal Marines, N029201P.
- Rear Admiral Christopher Shepherd, Royal Navy, C040032K.
- Major General Elizabeth Jane Faithfull-Davies, CBE, 548498.
- Major General Samuel Leslie Humphris, MBE, 548954.
- Air Vice-Marshal Jeremy John Attridge, OBE, Royal Air Force, 8304188T.
- Air Vice-Marshal Michael John Smeath, CBE, Royal Air Force, 8285997H.

Civil

- Jennifer Agnes Bell, lately Crown Solicitor for Northern Ireland. For services to the Administration of Justice
- Amanda Melanie Brooks (Amanda Kendall), CBE, Director General, Trade Group, Department for Business and Trade. For services to Economic Growth and International Trade
- Janette Anita Durbin, CBE, Director, Senior Talent and Resourcing, Cabinet Office. For Public Service
- Ashley James Ibbett, lately Director General for Energy Infrastructure, Department for Energy Security and Net Zero. For services to Energy and Net Zero
- Glynne David Jones, CBE, lately Director, Wales Office. For Public Service
- Angela MacDonald, CBE, Deputy Chief Executive Officer and Second Permanent Secretary, HM Revenue and Customs. For Public Service
- Sarah Ann Munby, lately Permanent Secretary, Department for Science, Innovation and Technology. For Public Service
- Dr Rebecca Weston, FREng, Managing Director Warhead, Defence Nuclear Organisation. For services to Defence

=== Most Distinguished Order of St Michael and St George ===
Order of St Michael and St George ribbon

==== Knight/Dame Commander of the Order of St Michael and St George (KCMG / DCMG) ====
- Susan Clare Inglish, Chair of Trustees, Disasters Emergency Committee. For services to Humanitarian Crises
- Richard Anthony Neil Crompton, CBE, HM Ambassador, British Embassy Kiev, Ukraine. For services to British Foreign Policy

==== Companion of the Order of St Michael and St George (CMG) ====
- Paul Richard Berman, lately Legal Director, Legal Directorate, Foreign, Commonwealth and Development Office. For services to British Foreign Policy and to International Law
- Martin Patrick Kent, HM Trade Commissioner for Asia Pacific. For services to International Trade and Investment
- Nicholas Peter Pickard, CVO, lately Director Europe, Foreign, Commonwealth and Development Office. For services to British Foreign Policy
- Sarbjit Singh Uppal, Director, Foreign, Commonwealth and Development Office. For services to National Security

=== Royal Victorian Order ===
Royal Victorian Order ribbon

==== Knight/Dame Commander of the Royal Victorian Order (KCVO / DCVO) ====
- Elisabeth Aline Clare Hunka, CVO, Director of Human Resources, Royal Household
- Leonora Mary, Countess of Lichfield, CVO, Lady-in-Waiting to The Princess Royal
- Dr Michael David Dixon, CVO OBE, Head of the Royal Medical Household and Doctor to The King
- David Vines White, Garter Principal King of Arms

==== Commander of the Royal Victorian Order (CVO) ====
- Sir Damon Marcus Buffini, lately Chair, Royal Anniversary Trust
- Annabelle Mary Galletley, LVO, Assistant Private Secretary and Lady-in-Waiting to The Duchess of Edinburgh
- Morfudd Ann Meredith, Lord-Lieutenant of South Glamorgan
- Jennifer Mary Tolhurst, Lord-Lieutenant of Essex

==== Lieutenant of the Royal Victorian Order (LVO) ====
- Dr Robin Francis Balfour, Principal Apothecary at The Palace of Holyroodhouse
- Hugh Douglas Borrowman, Official Secretary to The Governor of South Australia
- Dr Adrian George Clifton, Principal Apothecary at Sandringham
- Simon David Metcalf, MVO, lately The King's Armourer, Royal Collection Trust
- Simon John Pring, Assistant Solicitor for the Affairs of the Duchy of Lancaster, Farrer & Co
- Andrew James Richardson, MVO, Deputy Head of Events, Royal Household
- Dr Robert Hywel Thomas, Clinical Radiologist to The King, Royal Medical Household
- Jacqueline Wright (Jacky Wright), lately Committee Member, Sovereign Grant Audit and Risk Assurance Committee. For services to the Royal Household

==== Member of the Royal Victorian Order (MVO) ====
- Stuart Clive Allen, lately Head of Royal & VIP Operations, Jaguar Land Rover. For services to the Royal Household
- Hannah Louise Belcher, Senior Exhibition Project Manager, Royal Collection Trust
- Jason Peter Cannon, Fire Surveillance Officer, Royal Household
- Katrina Anne Farquhar, Personal Secretary (Scotland) to The King and Queen & Birkhall Manager, Balmoral Estate
- Jacqueline Mary Fergusson, Royal Florist, Royal Household
- Sally Barbara Goodsir, Curator of Decorative Arts, Royal Collection Trust
- Sarah-Ann Maureen Healy, Deputy Head of Security Liaison, Royal Household
- Callan Robert Kendal, Travel & Logistics Manager, Royal Household
- Jagjivan Singh Khangura, Inspector, Metropolitan Police Service. For services to Royalty and Specialist Protection
- Joseph Oswald Maurice Paul LeBlanc, MMM MSM CD, Senior Ceremonial and Protocol Adviser, Department of Canadian Heritage, Government of Canada
- Lara Chantal Marsden, Head of Commercial Finance, The Crown Estate, Windsor
- Lieutenant Commander (Rtd.) Christopher David Roger Morgan, RN, Trustee, The Princess Anne Charitable Trust
- Lucy Anne Peter, Curator of Paintings, Royal Collection Trust
- Darren John Randall, Constable, Metropolitan Police Service. For services to Royalty and Specialist Protection
- Alexandra Frances Campbell-Ricketts, Art Storage Manager, Royal Collection Trust
- Matthew John Shipton, Solutions Architect, Digital Services, Royal Household
- David Martin Taylor, Royalty and VIP Protection, Project and Operational Support Manager, Norfolk Constabulary. For services to Royalty and Specialist Protection
- Sally Jennifer Joan Tennant, OBE, Trustee, The Princess Anne Charitable Trust
- Iain Philip Terry, Head of Commercial Development, Royal Collection Trust
- Dr Richard Lindsey Williams, Learning Curator, Royal Collection Trust

Honorary

- Branislav Grac, Systems Engineer, Digital Services, Royal Household

=== Royal Victorian Medal (RVM) ===
Royal Victorian Medal ribbon

Bar to Silver

- Darren Noel Hill, RVM, Buildings Team Manager, The Crown Estate, Windsor

Silver

- Dominic Richard Jesse Adcock, Farrier. For services to the Royal Mews
- John William Farquhar, Security Team Leader, The Palace of Holyroodhouse
- Terrance Jones, Yeoman Bed Hanger, The King's Body Guard of the Yeomen of the Guard
- Jane Frances McKenzie, Retail Assistant, Royal Collection Trust
- Ross Alexander McLean, Groom, Royal Paddocks, Hampton Court Palace
- Colin Steven Prigent, Deputy Head Gardener, Government House, The Bailiwick of Guernsey
- Margaret Quilliam, lately Assistant Housekeeper, Government House, Isle of Man
- Bernadette Reid, Warden, Royal Collection Trust
- Lianne Claire Royall, Retail Administrator, Royal Collection Trust
- Christopher James Skaife, Yeoman Warder, His Majesty's Royal Palace and Fortress, the Tower of London

=== Most Excellent Order of the British Empire ===
Civil division ribbon

Military division ribbon

==== Knight/Dame Grand Cross of the Order of the British Empire (GBE) ====
Civil

- Dame Parveen June Kumar, DBE, Professor Emerita of Medicine and Education, Barts and the London School of Medicine and Dentistry, Queen Mary University of London. For services to Global Medical Education and Health.
- Sir Jonathan Stephen Cunliffe, CB, Chair, Independent Water Commission. For Public Service.

==== Knight/Dame Commander of the Order of the British Empire (KBE / DBE) ====
Military

- Vice Admiral Andrew Jeffery Kyte, CB, Royal Navy, C034224U.
- Lieutenant General Simon Peter Hamilton, CBE, 543296.
- Air Marshal Paul Harron Lloyd, CBE, Royal Air Force, 2636590J.

Civil

- Professor Sheila Macdonald Bird, OBE FMedSci FRSE OBE, FMedSci, FRSE. For services to Statistics.
- Malorie Blackman, OBE, Writer. For services to Literature.
- Professor Carol Elspeth Goodeve Brayne, CBE, Professor Emeritus and Senior Visiting Fellow, Department of Psychiatry, University of Cambridge. For services to Medicine, Medical Research and Public Health.
- Julia Catherine Donaldson, CBE, Writer. For services to Literature.
- Jane Fraser, Chief Executive Officer and Chair, Citigroup. For services to the Financial Sector.
- Helen Gordon, Chief Executive Officer, Grainger plc. For services to the Property Industry.
- Professor Sarah Lucina Hackman, Chair of Forensic Anthropology and Head of Discipline, Centre for Anatomy and Human Identification, University of Dundee. For services to Forensic Anthropology and Disaster Victim Identification.
- Professor Melanie Jane Hall, CBE, Professor of Diabetes Medicine, University of Leicester. For services to Global Diabetes Research, Policy and Care Management.
- Serena Margaret Kennedy, KPM DL, lately Chief Constable, Merseyside Police. For services to Policing.
- Shelagh Jane Legrave, CBE DL, Further Education Commissioner. For services to Education.
- Dr Beverly Isadore Lindsay, OBE DL, Chair, Association of Jamaican Nationals UK. For services to the West Midlands and to Charity.
- Jessica Elizabeth Morden, MP, Member of Parliament for Newport East and lately General Secretary, Welsh Labour. For Political and Public Service.
- Dr Crystal Elizabeth Oldman, CBE, lately Chief Executive, The Queen's Institute of Community Nursing. For services to Nursing.
- Dr Hayaatun Sillem, CBE, lately Chief Executive Officer, Royal Academy of Engineering. For services to Engineering.
- Professor Heather Vivienne Stevens, CBE. For services to the Environment, to Young People and to Philanthropy in Wales.
- Anna Kim Taylor, OBE, Executive Director, The Food Foundation. For services to Reforming the Food System.
- Sumeshni Tranka, Chief Nursing Officer, Welsh Government. For services to Nursing.

==== Commander of the Order of the British Empire (CBE) ====
Military

- Captain Adrian Coghill, Royal Navy, C041880G.
- Rear Admiral Daniel D'Silva, Royal Navy, C038402S.
- Commodore David M. Filtness (Operational)
- Brigadier Richard Stewart Charles Bell (Operational)
- Colonel Simon D'Olier Duckworth, OBE DL, Army Reserve, 30245067.
- Colonel Ross Henzell Noott, 547978.
- Brigadier Peter Thomas Quaite, OBE, 542635.
- Air Commodore Richard Fogden, Royal Air Force, 8024255D.
- Air Vice-Marshal Andrew Timothy Martin, OBE, Royal Air Force, 5204340N.
- Air Commodore Claire Hazel O'Grady, Royal Air Force, 8302829Q.

Civil

- Professor Ian David Abrahams, Professor, University of Cambridge. For services to Mathematical Sciences
- Dr Adikaari Appuhamilage Damitha Thilanga Adikaari, Director, Science and Innovation for Climate and Energy, Department of Energy Security and Net Zero. For services to Research and Innovation to Tackle Climate Change
- Samantha Jane Allen, Chief Executive, NHS North East and North Cumbria Integrated Care Board. For services to the NHS
- Professor Ron Arad, Industrial Designer, Artist, and Architectural Designer. For services to Art and Design
- Diana Sarah Brightmore-Armour, Chief Executive Officer, C. Hoare & Co. For services to Women and Diversity in Financial Services
- Thomas Roger Attwood, Chair of Trustees, Attwood Academy Trust. For services to Education
- Gary Anthony Badley, Senior Responsible Owner – Property Transformation Programme and Director of Property Services, Ministry of Justice. For Public Service.
- Sarah Frances Barclay, Founder and Director, Medical Mediation Foundation. For services to Families and Health Professionals in Conflict Management and Conflict Resolution.
- Wendy Mira Becker. For services to Business and to Charitable Causes
- Rebecca Bench (Rebecca Evernden), Director, UK Space Agency, Department for Science, Innovation and Technology. For services to Space
- Hannah Kate Bernard, OBE, Group Director, Business Banking, Nationwide, and Co-Chair, Invest in Women Taskforce. For services to Female Entrepreneurship and Access to Finance for Women
- Alan John Bishop, Chair, The Place. For services to Leadership in the Creative Industries
- Caroline Botwood, Director, Nuclear Projects Delivery. For services to the Nuclear Industry
- Martin Dafydd Brown, Director of Retirement Services, Department for Work and Pensions. For Public Service
- Dr Josephine Bunch, Fellow of the National Physical Laboratory. For services to Cancer Research and Mass Spectrometry Imaging
- Dr Meryl Anne Bushell, Crown Representative, Cabinet Office. For services to Public Procurement and to Women's Empowerment in the Commercial Profession
- Mark Jonathan Byers, Chief Operating Officer, His Majesty's Inspectorate of Constabulary and Fire and Rescue Services. For Public Service
- Steven Carlier, lately President, Rolls Royce Submarines. For services to Defence
- Clare Moira Chapman, Chair, Advisory, Conciliation and Arbitration Service. For services to Industrial Relations
- Craig Andrew Wyn Crowley, MBE, Chief Executive Officer, Action Deafness and Co-Chair of the British Sign Language Advisory Board. For services to Deaf and Deafblind People
- David John Raphael Currie, Chair, Proserv. For services to International Trade, Energy Transition and Economic Growth
- Taraneh Dean, Provost and Executive Director of Higher Education, London South Bank University Group. For services to Higher Education
- Dominic Dodd, lately Chair, UCLPartners. For services to the NHS
- Charles Hunter Donald, lately Chief Executive Officer, UK Government Investments. For services to Public Finance
- Patrick Doyle, Film Composer. For services to Film
- Anne Eden, Regional Director for South East, NHS England. For services to the NHS
- Sian Elliott, Director of Organising, Public Services and Skills, Trade Union Congress. For services to the Trade Union Movement
- Neil Fox, MBE. For services to Rugby League and to the community in West Yorkshire
- Allison Gardner, Chief Executive Officer, Glasgow Film. For services to Film and Cinema in Scotland
- Thomas Goldman, Deputy Director, Strategic Finance, Department for Education. For services to Education
- Henry Cyril Grunwald, OBE KC, KC, lately Chair of the National Holocaust Centre and Museum, Newark. For services to Holocaust Remembrance and Education
- Professor David John Gunnell, FMedSci, Emeritus Professor of Epidemiology, Bristol Medical School. For services to Public Health and Suicide Prevention
- Lisa Marie Harker, Director, Nuffield Family Justice Observatory. For services to Children and Young People
- Neil Heslop, OBE, Chief Executive, Charities Aid Foundation. For services to Philanthropy and Charity
- Rhiannon Jane Hiles, Chief Executive, Beamish Museum. For services to Museums and to the Culture and Heritage of North East England
- Jane Elisabeth Hill, Legal Director, Department for Business and Trade Legal Advisers, Government Legal Department. For services to the Law
- Justin Andrew Cardale Holliday, Chief Finance Officer and Tax Assurance Commissioner, HM Revenue and Customs. For Public Service
- Professor Simon John Hollingsworth, FMedSci, Vice-President and Global Franchise Head of Immune Oncology Bispecifics, AstraZeneca. For services to Biomedical Research and Medicine Development
- Dr Sarah Joan Hughes, Chief Executive Officer, Mind. For services to Mental Health and to Civil Society
- Christopher Hulatt, Co-Founder, Octopus Group. For services to Entrepreneurship
- Peter Rowland Tudor St John, Founder and Director, Caruso St John Architects. For services to Architecture
- Neil Anthony Johnson, Director, Materials, Department for Business and Trade. For services to Industry
- Christopher Neil Jones, Director, Home Office. For Public Service
- Katie Jones, Chair, Pension Protection Fund. For services to Pensions and Financial Education
- Melanie Keen, lately Director, Wellcome Collection. For services to Museums
- Yasmin Akhtar Khan, Chief Executive Officer, Halo Project. For services to Ending Domestic Abuse and Violence Against Women
- Vikki Joanne Knight, Director for Fraud, Error and Debt Policy and Strategy, Department for Work and Pensions. For Public Service
- Professor David Michael Knowles, FREng, Chief Executive Officer, Henry Royce Institute for Advanced Materials. For services to Academia and to Industry
- Patrick Iain Heath-Lay, Chief Executive Officer, People's Partnership. For services to the Pensions Industry
- Elaine Christina Lorimer, lately Chief Executive, Revenue Scotland. For Public Service
- Professor Joanna Louise Cannon Lowden (Joanna Cannon), Professor Emerita, The Courtauld Institute of Art. For services to Art Curation and Research
- Professor Rosemary Helen Luckin, Professor of Learner Centred Design, University College London Knowledge Lab. For services to Education
- Fiona Jane MacGregor, OBE, lately Chief Executive, Regulator of Social Housing. For services to Social Housing
- Ashley John Machin, lately Lead Non-Executive Director, Department for Work and Pensions. For Public Service
- Dr William Mackie, Chair, CentreStage, Kilmarnock. For services to Education and to the Economy
- Vishal Kumar Marria. For services to Technology, Economic Crime Prevention and to the Data and AI Sector
- Dr Ann Matheson, OBE, lately Keeper, National Library of Scotland. For services to Literature and Culture
- Paul McCreesh, Conductor. For services to Music and Music Education
- Ian Jeffrey McDermott, Chief Executive Officer, Peabody Trust. For services to Social Housing
- Annabel Ruth McKeon (Annabel Burns), Director of Strategy, Development and Change, HM Courts and Tribunals Service. For services to the Administration of Justice
- Bernard Amponsah Mensah, President of International, Bank of America and lately Chief Executive Officer, Merrill Lynch International. For services to Finance and the Economy
- Merope Mills, Patient Safety Campaigner. For services to Patient Safety
- Natalie Moore, Director, Ministry of Defence. For services to Defence
- Anthony Negus, Musical Director, Longborough Festival Opera. For services to Opera, particularly Mozart and Wagner, and to Young Artists
- Paul David Nisbet, Director of Communication Access Literacy and Learning Scotland, School of Education and Sport, Edinburgh University. For services to Education and the Development of Assistive Technology
- Joseph O'Neill, Chief Executive Officer, Belfast Harbour. For services to Business and to the community in Belfast
- Professor Timothy Robin Orchard, Chief Executive, Imperial College Healthcare NHS Trust and Professor of Gastroenterology, Imperial College London. For services to the NHS and Healthcare Research and Innovation
- Helen Jane Palmer, People Director, Department for Science, Innovation and Technology. For services to the Public and Charity Sectors
- Kunal Patel, lately Deputy Principal Private Secretary to the Prime Minister. For Public Service
- Ian David Piper, Chief Executive Officer, Ebbsfleet Development Corporation. For services to Housing and Regeneration
- Julia Natasha Pyke, Joint Managing Director, Sizewell C Ltd. For services to the UK Nuclear Energy Industry and other Clean Energy Technologies
- Professor Monder Ram, OBE DL, Founder and Director, Centre for Research in Ethnic Minority Entrepreneurship. For services to Ethnic Minority Business and Entrepreneurship
- Professor Hilary Ranson, Pro-Vice-Chancellor, Liverpool School of Tropical Medicine. For services to Global Health and to Equity in Science
- Dr Eva Kirsten Elisabet Rausing, DL, Founder, Alborada Trust. For services to Charity, to Animal Welfare, to Horseracing and Bloodstock
- Dr David Charles Rees, FMedSci, lately Chief Scientific Officer, Astex Pharmaceuticals. For services to Chemistry and Innovation
- Julia Ross, Chair, British Association of Social Workers. For services to Children and Families
- Professor Robert Stephen Rubin, OBE, Chairman, Pentland Capital Limited and Pentland Group Limited. For services to Inter-Faith Relations and to Charity
- Sukriti Prova Sen, Director of Children and Education Services, Coventry City Council. For services to Children Social Care
- Jonathan Isaac Sherman, Director, Business Assets and International, HM Customs and Revenue. For Public Service
- Andrew Philip Start, lately Chief Executive Officer, Defence Equipment and Support and Interim National Armaments Director. For services to Defence
- Professor Sarah Joanna Tabrizi, FMedSci, FRS, Professor of Clinical Neurology, University College London. For services to People with Huntington's Disease
- Professor Paul Jonathon Taylor, Police Chief Scientific Adviser, National Police Chiefs' Council. For services to Science in Policing
- Nigel Stewart Terrington, Chief Executive Officer, Paragon Banking Group. For services to the Financial Services Industry
- Charlotte Tilbury, MBE, President, Chair, Chief Creative Officer and Sole Founder, Charlotte Tilbury Beauty Ltd. For services to the Beauty and Cosmetics Industry
- Dr Richard Mark Vautrey, lately President, Royal College of General Practitioners and GP Partner, Meanwood Group Practice. For services to General Practice
- Dr Victoria Louise Winckler, lately Director, Bevan Foundation. For Public Service
- Terence Woods, QPM, Deputy Chief Constable, Greater Manchester Police. For services to Policing
- Deborah Jane Wosskow, OBE, Entrepreneur and Co-Chair, Invest in Women Taskforce. For services to Female Entrepreneurship and to Access to Finance for Women
- Jonathan Yates, Executive Director, Youth Endowment Fund, London. For services to Education
- Professor Ian Stuart Young, Consultant Chemical Pathologist, Belfast Health and Social Care Trust and Chief Scientific Advisor to the Department of Health. For services to Health Services Research and Development and to Health Education

Overseas and International

- The Honourable Franz Manderson, MBE, Deputy Governor, Cayman Islands. For services to the Cayman Islands Civil Service and to the wider community in the Cayman Islands.
- Lance Darrell Gordon Uggla, Founder, IHS Markit. For services to Business and to Philanthropy.

==== Officer of the Order of the British Empire (OBE) ====
Military

- Commander Benjamin Dorrington (Operational)
- Commander James Mitchell (Operational)
- Captain Philip Burgess, Royal Navy, C040741Q
- Commander James Alexander Grant McBratney, Royal Navy, C037014Y
- Commander Benjamin Smith, Royal Navy, C041002C
- Captain Keith James McFarlane Stephenson, Royal Navy, C037276X
- Major Michael James Brigham, MBE, The Mercian Regiment, 564272
- Colonel David Robertson Duncan, 548827
- Colonel Peter James Hale, 552719
- Colonel Oliver Peter Lees, Royal Corps of Signals, 559626
- Lieutenant Colonel Iain James Logan, Intelligence Corps, 5208751G
- Lieutenant Colonel Thomas David Holroyd Oakley, Irish Guards, 560937
- Colonel David John Robinson, 535877
- Colonel Toby Patrick Oughtred Till, MBE, 540069
- Lieutenant Colonel Jonathan Mark Wilson, TD VR, Army Reserve, 528663
- Group Captain Alexander Nelson Bennett, Royal Air Force, 5208953N
- Wing Commander Keith John Bissett, Royal Air Force, 2653795A
- Group Captain James Brooks, Royal Air Force, 30004173
- Group Captain Richard Charles Cameron, Royal Air Force, 5208290B
- Group Captain Nicola Jayne Duncan, Royal Air Force, 8241564R
- Wing Commander Sarah Michelle Tunstall, Royal Air Force, 2648994L
- Wing Commander Julian Patrick Leslie de Val, Royal Air Force, 25219820

Civil

- Gisela Maame Abbam, Chair, General Pharmaceutical Council. For services to the Pharmacy Professions and Health
- Helen Adam, Chair, Family Solutions Group and Senior Family Mediator, Wells Family Mediation. For services to Families, Children and Young People
- Stephen Olumbunmi Akinsanya, Barrister. For services to the Prevention of Knife Crime and Youth Violence
- Bruce Allen, Lately Chief Executive Officer, HETAS. For services to Renewable Energy and Net Zero
- Siobhan Alloway, Team Leader, Ministry of Defence. For services to Defence
- Dean Ames, Drugs and Toxicology Forensic Consultant, Metropolitan Police Service. For services to Public Safety
- Chenelle Ansah, Chief Executive Officer, Nell Consulting Ltd. For services to Investment, to Women in Business and to Charity
- Dr Andrea Jane Arlidge, Founder, Wellsway MAT and lately Chief Executive Officer, Futura Learning Partnership. For services to Education
- Kwadwo Asomani Adjepong, Solicitor. For services to Sport and Sports Law
- Kate Maggie Aubrey-Johnson, Barrister. For services to Children and the Youth Justice System
- Christopher Bailey, Team Leader, Ministry of Defence. For services to Defence
- Professor Graham Baldwin, Vice-Chancellor, University of Lancashire. For services to Higher Education
- Fiona Louise Ball, Bigger Picture and Sustainability Group Director, Sky. For services to Social Enterprise
- Thomas William Banham, Chief Executive, Hoyland Common Academy Trust, Barnsley, South Yorkshire. For services to Education
- Kristian Barnfield-Guest, Deputy Director, Business Effectiveness, Ministry of Justice. For services to Diversity and Inclusion
- David George Beeby, DL, Chair, Cumbria Economic Growth Board. For services to Business, to Economic Growth and to the Voluntary Sector in Cumbria
- Andrea Elaine Bennett, Regional Probation Director, North West Probation HM Prison and Probation Service. For services to Probation
- Claire Jane Bennett, Director, Climate Change and Environmental Sustainability, Welsh Government. For services to Vulnerable People, Children and to Community Cohesion
- Asif Jahangir Bhatti, Headteacher, Town Farm Primary School and Nursery, Staines, Surrey. For services to Education
- David William Birkbeck, Chief Executive, Design for Homes. For services to Housing Design
- Colin Everton Blair, Foster Carer, Birmingham Children's Trust. For services to Foster Care
- Mandy Blair, Foster Carer, Birmingham Children's Trust. For services to Foster Care
- Martin Oliver Blakebrough, Lately Chief Executive Officer, Kaleidoscope Project. For services to People Affected by Substance Misuse
- Caroline Boddington, DL, Prebendary and Senior Non-Executive Member, Wells Cathedral, Somerset. For services to the Church of England
- Dr David Christopher Sturgess Bonnett, Architect and Access Consultant. For services to Architecture and Inclusive Design
- Steven Borley, For services to the Welsh Economy Across Engineering, Construction and Sports Participation
- John Gordon Boumphrey, Vice-President, Country Manager UK and Ireland, Amazon. For services to Technology, Consumer and Digital Commerce Industry
- Mel Bound, Founder, This Woman Runs. For services to Women's Community Sport
- Helen Bowdur, Arts Leader. For services to Arts and Culture
- David Bowles, Head of Campaigns and Public Affairs, RSPCA. For services to Animal Welfare
- Philip Alan Broadhead, Lately Chair, Conservative Councillors Association. For Public Service
- Alison Brooks, Founder, Alison Brooks Architects. For services to Architecture
- Nigel John Brown, Chief Executive, Cafcass Cymru. For services to the Welfare of Children and Families
- Anthony Percy Scott Browne, Chair, and lately President, the British Art Market Federation. For services to the British Art Market
- Belinda Ann Budge, Lately Chair, Creative UK. For services to the Creative Industries and Publishing
- Adrian Patrick Boyce Budgen, National Head, Asbestos and Occupational Disease, Irwin Mitchell Solicitors. For services to the Victims of Asbestos Related Diseases and their Families
- Malcolm Burr, Lately Chief Executive, Comhairle nan Eilean Siar and Convener of the Electoral Management Board for Scotland. For Public Service
- Elizabeth Jane Butler, Trustee, Royal British Legion. For voluntary service to Veterans and to Public Service
- Paul Butler, Chair of Governors, Waltham Forest College, London Borough of Waltham Forest. For services to Further Education
- Javid Soli Canteenwala, Trustee and Honorary Treasurer, The Zoroastrian Trust Funds of Europe and Trustee and Chair of the Audit, Finance and Investment Committee, The Coutts Foundation. For services to Philanthropy and Charity
- The Reverend Elizabeth Amy Carnelly, Lately Director of Partnerships and of Near Neighbours, Church Urban Fund. For services to Community Cohesion
- Sarah Jane Castle, Official Solicitor and Public Trustee. For services to the Court of Protection, to the Chequers Trust and to the Public
- Peter Alan Chambré, Chair, Cancer Research Horizons and lately Trustee, Cancer Research UK. For Charitable Service
- David Chapman, Senior Official Receiver, Insolvency Service. For services to the Insolvency Sector and to the Economy
- Dr Lisa Marie Cherry, For services to Children, Young People and their Families across Education and Social Care
- Sandra Choi, Designer and Creative Director, Jimmy Choo. For services to Fashion
- Professor Fiona MacLeod Clark, Head of Capability Electronic Warfare Sensors, Leonardo UK Ltd. For services to Defence and to STEM Education
- Neil Charles Clifford, Chief Executive Officer, Kurt Geiger. For services to Fashion
- Timothy David Coates, Head of Prisoner Escort Custody Services, HM Prison and Probation Service. For Public Service
- Aletta Rachel Collins, Director and Choreographer. For services to Dance
- Michael David Cook, JP, Lately Receiver General, St John Scotland. For services to the Order of St John
- Carl Andrew Cox, DJ and Broadcaster. For services to Music
- Dr Sharon Curtis, Chief Executive Officer, Emosi, Burngreave, Sheffield. For services to Early Years Education and Children's Mental Health
- Dr Camilla Darling, Director of Research Development, Arts and Sciences, King's College London and Vice-Chair, The Kalisher Trust. For services to Young People and to the Diversity of the Bar
- Susan Joan Dawe, Scotland Managing Partner, EY. For services to Financial Services
- Maria Anne Dawes, Chief Executive Officer, Schools Alliance for Excellence, Surrey. For services to Education
- Myrtle May Dawes, Chief Executive, Net Zero Technology Centre. For services to Energy and Technology
- Tony Day, Principal and Chief Executive Officer, Joseph Chamberlain Sixth Form College, Birmingham. For services to Education
- Estelle Alexandra Michelle Dehon, KC, Barrister, Cornerstone Barristers. For services to Environmental Law
- David Barry Dein, MBE, Founder, The Twinning Project. For services to Football and to Charity
- Dr Urshla Devalia, President, British Society of Paediatric Dentistry. For services to Children's Oral Health
- Angela Jayne Doll, Chief Executive for Govia Thameslink Railway. For services to Diversity and Inclusion in the Rail Sector
- Luke Campbell Donald, MBE, Golfer. For services to Golf
- Berhane Dory, Senior Lecturer and Academic, Early Childhood Studies, London Metropolitan University. For services to Education and Early Years
- Mari Eggins, Founding Chief Executive Officer, Carefree Cornwall. For services to Young People
- Professor Andrew Tyler Elder, Lately President, Royal College of Physicians of Edinburgh. For services to Medicine and to Medical Education
- Stephen Richard Elderkin, Director of Environmental Sustainability for National Highways. For services to the Environment and to Transport
- Andrew Elliott, Team Leader, Ministry of Defence. For services to Defence
- Aileen Evans, Lately Chief Executive, Grand Union Housing Group. For services to Social Housing
- Alastair Graham Farnsworth, Defence Legal Counsellor, British Defence Staff USA. For services to Defence
- Professor David Henry Felix, Lately Dean of Postgraduate Dental Education and Director of Dentistry, NHS Education for Scotland. For services to Dental Education and Clinical Training
- Paul Finnegan, Chief Executive, Lighthouse. For services to Charity
- David Fishwick, Entrepreneur and Founder, Burnley Savings and Loans. For services to Finance, to Business and to Charity
- Dexter Fletcher, Actor and Director. For services to Film and Television
- Paul Jason Franklin, Visual Effects Designer and Filmmaker. For services to Visual Effects Design and the International Motion Picture Industry
- Graeme Ross Fraser, Assistant Inspector, HM Fire Service Inspectorate for Scotland. For services to the Scottish Government and to the Fire and Rescue Service
- Professor Anthony Fretton, Architect. For services to Architecture
- Emma Johanna Frost, Lately Assistant Chief of Staff, Permanent Joint Headquarters. For services to Military Operations
- Professor Luke Gregory Georghiou, Lately Deputy President and Deputy Vice-Chancellor, University of Manchester. For services to Science and Innovation
- Robin William Gisby, Lately Chief Executive Officer, DFT Operator Limited. For services to the Rail Network
- Louise Elizabeth Glen, Lately Senior Education Officer, Languages, Education Scotland. For services to the Languages Education Community in Scotland
- John Lyburn Scott Grant, Chair, J. & G. Grant. For services to the Scotch Whisky Industry and to Charity.
- Julian Toby Gray Gravatt, Deputy Chief Executive, Association of Colleges, Greater London. For services to Further Education
- Bernadette Anne Green, Chief Executive Officer, Preston Primary Academy Trust, Yeovil, Somerset. For services to Education
- Dr Suzanne Claire Green (Suzy Charman) Executive Director for the Road Safety Foundation. For services to Road Safety
- The Very Reverend Dean Kenneth Robert James Hall, For services to Reconciliation and Peace Building in Enniskillen and County Fermanagh
- Timothy Hall, Head of Estates and Programmes. Woodland Trust Scotland, Chair, Future Woodlands Scotland and Trustee, Borders Forest Trust. For services to Conservation and to Forestry
- Alistair Halliday, Chief Executive Officer, Forces Employment Charity. For services to Service Personnel, Veterans and Families
- Dr Clare June Halsted, Lately Athlete, Administrator and Volunteer. For services to Fencing
- Karen Jane Hamilton, Lately Chair, NHS Borders. For services to Health and to the community in the Scottish Borders
- Sarah Hamilton-Fairley, Chief Executive, UK Sepsis Trust. For services to Sepsis Awareness
- Catherine Handcock, Founder, Creative HEAD. For services to the Hairdressing Industry and to Entrepreneurship
- Professor Mohamed Wasim Hanif, Clinical Advisor, Diabetes UK and Professor of Diabetes and Endocrinology, University Hospitals Birmingham NHS Foundation Trust. For services to Diabetes and to Health Inequalities
- Robert Edward Haring, Chief Executive Officer, Westcountry Schools Trust, Devon. For services to Education
- John Paul Harkin, Director and Founder, Alchemy Technology Services. For services to Economic Development and to Entrepreneurship
- Linda Margaret Harrison-Simcock, Foster Carer, Children's Services, Leeds City Council. For services to Foster Care and to Vulnerable Children
- Mina Hasman, Sustainability Director, Skidmore, Owings and Merrill. For services to Architecture and Sustainable Design
- Dr Hilda Hayo, Chief Admiral Nurse and Chief Executive, Dementia UK. For services to People Affected by Dementia
- Diane Margaret Heritage, Chair of Trustees, New Collaborative Learning Trust. For services to Education
- Nicholas Anthony Joseph Hern, Founder, Nick Hern Books. For services to Theatre
- Katherine Jane Herrick, Lately Head of Elections, Northern Ireland Office. For Public Service
- Professor Rachel Mary Hilliam, Head of School of Mathematics and Statistics, Open University. For services to Data Science
- Rachel Anne Hollis, Lately Chair, Professional Nursing Committee, Royal College of Nursing and Honorary Nurse Advisor for Children's Cancer Care, The Leeds Teaching Hospitals NHS Trust. For services to Nursing
- Clare Hornby, Founder and Chief Executive Officer, ME+EM. For services to the Fashion Industry
- Barbara Ann Hughes, Lately Chair of Governors, Solihull College and University Centre, West Midlands. For services to Further Education
- Professor Iain Louis Hutchison, Founder and Chief Executive, Saving Faces – The Facial Surgery Research Foundation. For services to Preventing and Treating Facial Cancers
- Joanne Irving, Commercial Director, UK Export Finance. For services to Government Procurement
- Peter John James, Author. For services to Literature and to Charity
- Simon William Temple James, For services to Education and to Music
- Andrew John Jamieson, Lately Chief Executive of Offshore Renewable Energy Catapult. For services to the Renewable Energy Industries
- Professor Ann John, Professor of Public Health and Psychiatry, Swansea University. For services to Suicide Prevention and to Digital Innovation
- Professor Stephen Jolles, Consultant Immunologist, Immunodeficiency Centre for Wales. For services to Immunology and Rare Diseases
- Ian Stanley Joseph, Co-Founder, Trustees Unlimited and Step on Board, and Joint Managing Director, Russam. For services to the Voluntary Sector
- Geraint Wyn Jowers, Deputy Director, Security Consultancy Services, HM Revenue and Customs. For Public Service
- Emma Victoria Kane, Deputy Chair, Elton John AIDS Foundation. For services to Philanthropy
- Professor Emeritus Pamela Kearns, Professor of Clinical Paediatric Oncology, University of Birmingham. For services to Cancer Research
- Joanna Elizabeth Keating, Head of International Development, Scottish Government. For services to International Development
- Arlene Kee, MBE, Director Youth Service, Education Authority. For services to Young People.
- Dr Niall Gerald James Keenan, Divisional Director for Medicine Services, West Hertfordshire Teaching Hospitals NHS Trust. For services to the NHS
- Colonel (Rtd) Timothy Langton Kingsberry, Border Force Deputy Director Operations South, Home Office. For services to Border Security and Safeguarding
- Dr Helen Kirkpatrick, MBE, Lately Chair QUBIS Board, Queen's University Belfast. For services to Economic Development and Innovation
- Dr Geeta Kumar, Consultant Obstetrician and Gynaecologist, Betsi Cadwaladr University Health Board North Wales. For services to Women's Health
- Maria Louise Lane, Deputy Director for People Safety, Department for Work and Pensions. For services to People Safety and Wellbeing
- Dominic Robin Crofts Llewellyn, Founder and Chief Executive Officer, AchieveGood. For services to the Impact Economy
- David Richard Lloyd, Deputy Principal Clerk, Journal Office, House of Commons. For services to Parliament
- Professor Janet Margaret Lord, Deputy Pro-Vice Chancellor, Manchester Metropolitan University and Independent Chair, Priority Area. For services to Education
- Janette Luca, Director of Public Affairs, ITV. For services to Broadcasting and Television
- Janet Caenwyn Lumb, Chief Executive Officer and Founder, Timeout Children's Homes, West Yorkshire. For services to Vulnerable Children in the Care Sector
- Professor Eunice Carol Rita Lumsden, Professor, University of Northampton. For services to Children's Rights and Welfare
- Jonathan David Lutwyche, Founder and Chief Executive Officer, Yordas Group. For services to Sustainable Chemicals Management, to Economic Growth, to International Trade, and to Advancing Opportunities for Women and Young People
- Mairi-Anne MacDonald, Deputy Director Development and Innovation, Research in Practice, London Borough of Hackney. For services to Social Work
- June Frances MacGeachey, Co-Founder, Peak Scientific. For services to Business, to Education and to Philanthropy
- Maitland Mackie, Chairman, Mackies of Scotland. For services to Farming, to Business Innovation and to Sustainability
- Rohan Malik, United Kingdom and Ireland Government and Public Sector Managing Partner, EY. For services to Business and Professional Services
- Dr Rashmi Mantri, Founder and Chief Executive Officer, British Youth International College. For services to Mathematics Education
- John Philip Birkett Marshall, Lately Chair, Newcastle Gateshead Initiative. For services to the Local Economy in the North East
- Harry Matovu, KC, Chair, Black Talent Charter and King's Counsel. For services to Business and to the Legal Profession
- Cerys Matthews, MBE, Musician and Broadcaster. For services to Music
- Michael May, Inclusion Consultant. For services to Survivors of Sexual Violence and Abuse
- Paul Joseph McBride, For services to Education
- Peter Michael James McCleave, Founder, 10,000 Donors. For services to Blood Cancer Awareness and to Charity
- Dr Brian James McConnell, Lately Chief Executive, Hydrock. For services to Engineering
- John Fraser McLeish, Chief Executive, The Gordon Highlanders Museum and Chair, The Scottish Tartans Authority. For services to Heritage and to the community in Aberdeenshire
- Robert Ian Mclintock, Trustee, Active Essex Foundation. For services to the community in Essex
- Professor Janet Karen Monkman Gray, Chief Executive, Academy of Healthcare Science. For services to the Healthcare Science Workforce
- Professor Richard Lewis Moorhead, Professor of Law and Professional Ethics, University of Exeter and Professor of Law, Monash University. For services to Legal Ethics
- Professor Iain Keith Moppett, Professor of Anaesthesia and Perioperative Medicine, University of Nottingham and Chair, Centre for Research and Improvement, Royal College of Anaesthetists. For services to Perioperative Care
- Judith Ann Morrison, Solicitor, to the Scottish Parliament. For services to the Scottish Parliament
- Eileen Murphy, Chief Executive, Women's Aid Armagh-Down. For services to Charity
- Shaun Peter Murphy, Snooker Player. For services to Snooker and to Charity
- Ifty Nasir, Founder and Chief Executive Officer, Vestd. For services to Share Schemes and the Energy Sector
- Philip Newborough, Co-Founder and Lately Chief Executive Officer, Bridges Fund Management Limited. For services to Business Growth and Impact Investing
- The Right Reverend Monsignor Peter O'Reilly, For services to Reconciliation and Peace Building in Enniskillen and County Fermanagh
- Bernard John Ord, For services to Industry, to Charitable Causes and to the community in Teesside
- Paul Oxborough, Founder, Mental Health Motorbike. For services to Mental Health and to Charity
- Andrew Ronald Page, Deputy Director, Transfer Pricing, HM Revenue and Customs. For Public Service
- Roxanna Anna Panufnik, Composer. For services to Music and to Charity
- John Michael Pearce, Lately Director of Children's Services, Durham County Council. For services to Children and Young People
- Tricia Anesther Pereira National Leader in Workforce Race Equity and Equality and Co-Chair, Independent Advisory Group. For services to Social Work and Social Care
- Simon Charles Perryman, Lately Chair of Governors, Barnsley College, South Yorkshire. For services to Further Education
- Professor Veronica Moraa Pickering, Lord-Lieutenant of Nottinghamshire. For Voluntary Service
- David Stuart Pinder, Chair, Green Construction Board. For services to Advancing Net Zero and Biodiversity in the Construction Sector
- Lisa Clare Pinney, MBE, Lately Chief Executive of the Mining Remediation Authority. For services to the Environment
- Colin Neil Pirie, For services to Young People, to Business and to the community in Bristol
- Paul Michael Pitts, Principal Scientist, Noise and Vibration, Department for Work and Pensions. For services to Measurement and Assessment of the Exposure to Noise and Vibration
- Guy St John Platten, MNM, Secretary General, The International Chamber of Shipping. For services to the Maritime Sector
- Sandra Mary Plaw, Foster Carer, Hampshire County Council. For services to Foster Care
- Alexis Mary Poole, Assistant Chief Officer, Devon and Cornwall Police. For services to Policing
- Jane Barbara Porter, Foster Carer and Chair of Fostering Executive Committee, Surrey County Council. For services to Foster Care
- Charlotte Potter, Team Leader, Ministry of Defence. For services to Defence
- Gillian Mary Preece, Senior Policy Manager, Home Office. For Public Service
- Professor Andy Purvis, Professor of Biodiversity, Natural History Museum. For services to Biodiversity Science
- Dr Martin Raby, Principal and Chief Executive, The Northern School of Art, Middlesbrough and Hartlepool, North Yorkshire and County Durham. For services to Higher Education
- Ashfaq Ahmed Rahman, Chief Executive Officer, Nova Education Trust, Nottingham. For services to Education
- Andrew Mark Ransom, Lately, Chief Executive Officer, Rentokil Initial. For services to the Business Support Services Sector
- Dr Emma Victoria Rawson, Director of Public Policy, Association of Taxation Technicians. For Public Service
- David Read, Head of Delivery North West, Ministry of Housing, Communities and Local Government. For Public Service
- Dr Martin Robert Reeves, Chief Executive, Oxfordshire County Council. For services to Local Government
- Celia Richardson, Director of Communications and Fundraising, The National Trust. For services to Conservation
- Dr Colin Mark Richardson, Assistant Professor, Northumbria University. For services to Firefighter Safety
- Dr Marcus Rink Chief Inspector of Drinking Water, Drinking Water Inspectorate. For services to Water Quality
- Dr Ian Ritchey, FREng, Director, Connect Northumberland. For services to Engineering
- John Michael Roberson, Distinguished Specialist, Nuclear Threat Reduction, AWE. For services to Defence
- Ian Robertson For services to Rugby Union and to Broadcasting
- John Manwaring Robertson, Chair, No Going Back. For services to Offender Rehabilitation
- His Honour Judge Jonathan Lee Rose, Resident Judge, Crown Court at Bradford and Honorary Recorder of Bradford. For services to the Administration of Justice and to the Young People of Bradford
- Dr Nicola Jayne Rose, Interim Executive Director of Science and Research, Medicines and Healthcare Products Regulatory Agency. For services to Science and Public Health
- June Elizabeth Ross, MBE, Founder and Chief Executive Officer, Esther Community Enterprise. For Charitable Service
- Rachael Ross, MBE, Founding Officer, National Down Syndrome Policy Group. For services to Education, Policy and People with Down Syndrome
- Sophie Ross, Founder and Creative Director, Trotters Childrenswear and Accessories Limited. For services to Business and to the Retail Industry
- Andrew Charles Routley, Governor, HM Prison Huntercombe and lately Deputy Governor, HM Prison Aylesbury. For Public Service
- Fleur Ruda, Deputy Director, Employment Rights, Department of Business and Trade Legal Advisers, Government Legal Department. For services to the Law
- Hannah Rutter, Deputy Director, Office for Digital Identities and Attributes, Department for Science, Innovation and Technology. For services to Digital Identity and Open Policy Making
- Hilary Margaret Ryan, Specialist Prosecutor, Crown Prosecution Service. For services to Law and Order
- Ian Knut Salter, Partner, Burges Salmon LLP. For services to the Nuclear Industry
- Aline Santos Farhat, Chief Brand Officer and Chief Diversity and Inclusion Offer, Unilever. For services to Retail Industry
- Emily Beth Scarratt, MBE, For services to Rugby Union
- Alyson Lynn Scurfield, Chief Executive, TEC Services Association. For services to Technology Enabled Care
- Professor Susan Elizabeth Sentance, Research Professor and Director, The Raspberry Pi Computing Education Research Centre, University of Cambridge. For services to Education
- Mukesh Sharma, MBE DL, Deputy Chair and Trustee, The National Lottery Heritage Fund and Chair, Northern Ireland Committee, National Lottery Heritage Fund. For services to Heritage
- Nikita Sharma, Head of Targeted Outreach and Research, Judicial Appointments Commission. For services to Improving Judicial Diversity
- Jeffrey Bradley Shear, Fundraiser and Founder, Solid Management. For services to the Fundraising Sector
- Professor Tara Georgina Shears, Professor of Particle Physics, University of Liverpool. For services to Physics
- Dr Inderpal Singh, National Clinical Lead, Falls and Frailty. For services to Osteoporosis Care in Wales
- Roderick Charles Smallwood, Artist Manager and Founder, Truants Foundation. For services to Music and to Charity
- Michael Gordon Smith, Lately Chair, The Foyle Foundation and Trustee, The National Brain Appeal. For Charitable Service
- Terry Stacy, MBE JP, Chair, Tonic Housing. For services to the LGBTQ+ Community
- Lady (Alison Helen Johns) Stephenson, Lately Chief Executive, Advance HE. For services to Higher Education
- Mark Stewart, Courts and Tribunals Director, HM Courts and Tribunals Service. For Public Service
- John Anthony Stiven, Honorary General Secretary, English Schools' Swimming Association. For services to Young People
- Gary Stott, Executive Chair, Community Shop. For services to the Circular Economy and to Building Communities
- Dr Mark Campbell Stuart, For services to the Pharmacy Profession in Sport and to Anti-Doping
- Ruth Sunderland, Business Ambassador, Royal Osteoporosis Society. For services to People with Osteoporosis
- Professor Joanna Kate Swaffield, Professor of Economics and Dean of the Faculty of Social Sciences, University of Southampton. For services to Economics
- Margaret Anne Swinson, Honorary Canon and Chair, Anglican Consultative Council. For services to the Church of England and to the Anglican Communion
- Muhammed Fazan Tahir, Managing Director, Tahir Group. For services to Young People and to Social Mobility
- Allan Taylor, Head of Offshore Wind Investment, Department for Energy Security and Net Zero. For services to Renewable Energy
- Jonathan Stuart Taylor Regional Improvement for Standards and Excellence Adviser and lately Chief Executive Officer, Sapientia Education Trust, Norfolk. For services to Education and School Improvement
- Jonathan Henry Thornton, Chair, University Council, University of Huddersfield. For services to Higher Education
- Sharon Elizabeth Todd, Chief Executive, The Society of Chemical Industries. For services to Innovation
- Mary Elizabeth Tuckett, JP DL, Lately Regional Leadership Magistrate for South East England and Nominated Judicial Office Holder. For services to the Criminal Justice System
- James Walter Tugendhat, Lately Chief Executive Officer, HC-One. For services to Adult Social Care
- Susanna Tugwell, Deputy Director, National Crime Agency. For services to Law Enforcement
- Geoffrey Paul Underwood, DL, Founder and Chief Executive Officer, Inflight Peripherals Limited. For services to the Technology Industry
- Johann Walker, Director Estate Services, AWE. For services to Defence
- Kayleigh Jane Wall, Team Leader, International Directorate, Department for Science, Innovation and Technology. For Public Service
- Robert Gerald Walsh, Lately Chief Executive, North East Lincolnshire Council. For services to Local Government
- Rebekah Warburton, Deputy Director for Health Transformation and Delivery, Department for Work and Pensions. For Public Service
- Professor Jamie Norman Waterall, Deputy Chief Public Health Nurse, Department of Health and Social Care. For services to Public Health Nursing
- Professor Kaye Wellings, Professor of Sexual and Reproductive Health, London School of Hygiene & Tropical Medicine. For services to Sexual and Reproductive Health
- Dr Adrian West, Officer, National Crime Agency. For services to Law Enforcement
- Peter Joseph Wheeler, Councillor, Cheshire West and Chester, Labour Party. For Political Service
- Professor Christopher Bruce Alexander Whitelaw, Lately Director, The Roslin Institute. For services to Bioscience
- Sian Barbara Wilkins, Head of Procedure and Parliamentary Skills, Senedd Cymru. For Parliamentary and Public Service
- Nicholas Guy Wilkinson, Lately Chief Executive Officer, Dunelm. For services to the Retail Sector
- Carolyn Florence Williamson Lately Chief Executive, Hampshire County Council. For services to Local Government
- Richard John Willmott, For services to the Construction Industry
- Alice Witherow, Chief Executive Officer, Cheviot Learning Trust, Northumberland. For services to Education
- Gillian Wright, Team Leader, Ministry of Defence. For services to Defence
- Lyn Alison Wright, Lately Chief Executive Officer, The Sigma Trust, Essex. For services to Education and to Tackling Coastal Deprivation

Overseas and International

- Carolyn Ainsworth, Head of Department, Foreign, Commonwealth and Development Office. For services to National Security.
- Dr. Phillip John Ambler, Co-Founder of Border Eye Program Thailand and Karenaid UK. For services to Eye Health in Myanmar.
- Dr. Peter John Baxter, former Consultation Physician in Public Health. For services to Public Health and to Protecting Communities from Volcanic Hazards.
- Stuart Caine, Head of Department, Foreign, Commonwealth and Development Office. For services to National Security.
- Giles Martin Dickson, Chief Executive Officer, Wind-Europe. For services to Renewable Energy and UK/EU Energy Cooperation.
- Dr. Matthew Scott Dryden, Consultant in Infection – UK Overseas Territories Programme, UK Health Security Agency. For services to Health, particularly in the UK Overseas Territories.
- Dr. Christopher John Alexander Hammond, Head of Department, Foreign, Commonwealth and Development Office. For services to British Foreign Policy.
- Thomas Reynolds Heron, Senior Submarine Rescue Vehicle Pilot, JFD. For services to UK and Global Submarine Rescue Operations.
- Fern Horine, H.M. Ambassador, British Embassy Chisinau, Moldova. For services to British Foreign Policy.
- Professor Ronjon Nag, Stanford University and Founder, R42 Group. For services to Entrepreneurship and to Artificial Intelligence.
- Dr. Tariq Hafidh Obaide, Chair, The British Education Group. For services to British Education Overseas and to UK/Morocco Relations.
- Lucy Annabel Pinches, Project Manager, Mine Action Review. For services to Humanitarian Disarmament and Peacebuilding.
- Professor Mark Coleman Poznansky, Director Vaccine and Immunotherapy Center, Physician, Infectious Diseases Medicine, Massachusetts General Hospital, and *Professor of Medicine, Harvard Medical School, United States of America. For services to UK/US Biomedical Research and Collaboration.
- Alexander James Profumo, Head of Department, Foreign, Commonwealth and Development Office. For services to British Foreign Policy.
- Sohail Ahmed Rahman, lately Anchor, Al Jazeera News. For services to Journalism and to Charitable Fundraising.
- Amir Hussain Ramzan, British Council Regional Director, Middle East/North Africa. For services to UK Cultural Relations Overseas.
- Andrew James Scott, Sculptor. For services to Sculpture and the Arts.
- Andrew Henry Waggett, Head of Department, Foreign, Commonwealth and Development Office. For services to British Foreign Policy.

==== Member of the Order of the British Empire (MBE) ====
Military

- Major Rupert Henry Johnstone-Burt, Royal Marines, 30240024.
- Lieutenant Commander Aaron Coates, Royal Navy, 30137843.
- Lieutenant Commander Phoebe Harriet Hall, Royal Navy, 30144205.
- Lieutenant Adam Lappin, Royal Navy Reserve, D250757S.
- Warrant Officer Class 1 (Logistics) (Police) Dean Latham, Royal Navy, D243550E.
- Lieutenant (Sea Cadet Corps) Joshua McDermott, Royal Navy Reserve, A010013X.
- Warrant Officer Class 1 (Warfare) (Electronic Warfare) William Dean Penric, Royal Navy, D262593U.
- Commander Adam Maxwell Prevett, Royal Navy, C041919A.
- Warrant Officer Class 1 (Supply Chain) Lee Reeves, Royal Navy, D220588M.
- Lieutenant Commander Michael Rydiard, Royal Navy, C901286G.
- Captain Noel Eguasi-Acquah, Adjutant General’s Corps (Staff and Personnel Support Branch), 30039050.
- Captain Kayleigh Sandra Hannah Baker, Adjutant General’s Corps (Educational and Training Services Branch), 30271468.
- Captain Andy Ananda Balwah, Royal Army Physical Training Corps, 25052530.
- Warrant Officer Class 2 James Michael Beck, Royal Corps of Signals, 25177664.
- Major James David Burbridge, Corps of Royal Engineers, 30028236.
- Major Daniel Brian Louis Cole, The Princess of Wales’s Royal Regiment, 30039418.
- Sergeant Perry Gordon Cook, Corps of Royal Electrical and Mechanical Engineers, 30190759.
- Warrant Officer Class 2 Adam Jeffrey David Detheridge, The Royal Logistic Corps, 30097004.
- Major Thomas James Doyle, Corps of Royal Engineers, 30115334.
- Staff Sergeant Jack Gary Edwards, Royal Corps of Signals, 30110359.
- Major Thomas Fraser Fortune, The Royal Regiment of Scotland, 30244910.
- Captain George Sackville Lane Fox, The Blues and Royals (Royal Horse Guards and 1st Dragoons), 30280473.
- Major Carol Ann Gallagher, Intelligence Corps, Army Reserve, 563273.
- Warrant Officer Class 1 Jason Lionel Hartland, The Queen’s Royal Hussars, 25147155.
- Major Kieran James Hatchley, The King’s Royal Hussars, 30116510.
- Major Mark Alan Hayward, The Rifles, 566259.
- Lieutenant Colonel Robin Hicks, The Princess of Wales’s Royal Regiment, 556702.
- Major Michael Ian Morris Howden, Intelligence Corps, 25067881.
- Corporal Steven Hume, The Royal Regiment of Scotland, 25151924.
- Corporal Matthew Robert Jones, Intelligence Corps, 30154199.
- Lieutenant Colonel Stuart Alan Keegan, VR, The Royal Wessex Yeomanry, Army Reserve, 561135.
- Captain Simon David Middleton, Royal Regiment of Artillery, 30128927.
- Major Owen George Mitchell, The Rifles, 25046225.
- Major Luke Francis Moran, Army Air Corps, 25232864.
- Lieutenant Colonel Brian Anthony O’Neill, The Royal Regiment of Scotland, 558778.
- Major John Richard O’Neill, Adjutant General’s Corps (Royal Military Police), 25165767.
- Major Alexandra Elizabeth Petherbridge, The Royal Logistic Corps, W1059433.
- Lieutenant Colonel Anthony Derek Pick, Corps of Royal Engineers, 24792702.
- Captain Steven Joseph Rasburn, Intelligence Corps, 25192969.
- Major Stuart David Robinson, VR., Intelligence Corps, Army Reserve, 557719.
- Major Thomas Edward Rutherford, The Royal Regiment of Fusiliers, 25018662.
- Major Mark James Saunders, Corps of Royal Electrical and Mechanical Engineers, 24853515.
- Major Alexander John Piers Shirreff, Grenadier Guards, 30079137.
- Major Glen Smith, Adjutant General Corps (Staff and Personnel Support Branch), 25039338.
- Lieutenant Colonel Hannah Mary Taylor, Royal Army Medical Service, 566394.
- Major Tobias Whitmarsh, The Royal Irish Regiment, 30018584.
- Major Karl Woodside, The Royal Logistic Corps, 24870756.
- Squadron Leader Richard Peter George Allison, Royal Air Force, 8304670G.
- Corporal Bethany Anne Andrews, Royal Air Force, 30191566.
- Master Aircrew Christopher James Bradbury, Royal Air Force, H8261007.
- Warrant Officer Richard Anthony Grimshaw-Else, Royal Air Force, J8426100.
- Flight Lieutenant James David Hobkirk, Royal Air Force, 8304113P.
- Flying Officer Graeme William Alexander Hughes, Royal Air Force, 30385666.
- Flight Lieutenant Paul Medford, Royal Air Force, 30005967.
- Warrant Officer Murugesvaran Subramaniam, Royal Air Force, H8434864.
- Squadron Leader Kris Turner, Royal Air Force, 30344117.
- Master Aircrew Peter Richard Welsh, Royal Air Force, K8444666.
- Squadron Leader Daniel John Wilkes, Royal Air Force, 30295571.
- Corporal Kirsty Youle, Royal Air Force, 30230958.

Civil

- Geoffrey William Agnew, Joint Executive Group Chair, Henderson Group. For services to Business and to the community in Northern Ireland.
- Martin John Agnew, Joint Executive Group Chair, Henderson Group. For services to Business and to the community in Northern Ireland.
- Dr. Rosemary Elizabeth Agnew, lately Director of Agricultural Policy, Department of Agriculture, Environment and Rural Affairs. For services to Agriculture.
- Michelle Agyemang. For services to Association Football.
- Michael Richard Kelvin Akers, Founder, Mikey's Wish Foundation. For services to Special Educational Needs.
- Sally Elizabeth Alexander, Principal and Chief Executive Officer, Milton Keynes College Group, Buckinghamshire. For services to Further Education.
- Faria Ali, Senior Associate Solicitor, Herbert Smith Freehills. For Charitable and Voluntary Service.
- Tahira Ali, Foster Carer, Birmingham Children’s Trust’s Fostering Agency. For services to Foster Care.
- Professor Margaret Joan Allan, lately Pharmacy Dean, Health Education and Improvement Wales. For services to Pharmacy.
- Kirsteen Allison, Disability Awareness Trainer. For services to the Deaf and Disabled Community.
- Diana Ambache, Musician, Broadcaster and Writer. For services to Music and to Education.
- John Ambler, Historian, Royal Marines Band Service. For voluntary service to Military History.
- Peter Amies, Flood and Coastal Risk Management Advisor, Environment Agency. For services to the Environment and to Flood Protection.
- Professor John Stanley Alan Anderson. For voluntary services to Education and to the community in Northern Ireland.
- Karen Jayne Andrew, JP, Magistrate West Glamorgan Bench and Independent Monitoring Board Member, H.M. Prison Swansea. For services to Prisoners, to the Administration of Justice and to the community in Swansea.
- Trevor Annon, Managing Director and Chair, Mount Charles. For services to Business, to Sport and to Charity in Northern Ireland.
- Andreas Antona, Founder, Bocuse d'Or UK Academy. For services to the Hospitality Sector and to Charity.
- Nafiza Akter Anwar, Co-Founder and Director, Association of South Asian Midwives. For services to Charity and to Healthcare.
- Clare Margaret Mary Apel, Chair, Chichester District Council. For services to the Voluntary Sector, to Local Government and to Holocaust Education.
- Charles Edward Appleyard, Founder, Sport Parkinson’s. For services to people with Parkinson’s Disease and Fundraising.
- Wesley David Aston, lately Chief Executive, Ulster Farmers’ Union. For services to Agriculture.
- Helen Robyn Atkinson, Director of Public Health, Portsmouth City Council. For services to Public Health.
- Professor Emeritus David Austin. For services to the Heritage of Wales, to Economic Regeneration and to Young People.
- Pauline Helen Margaret Lamb Aylesbury, Deputy Director, Marketing, Insight, Brand Scotland and Internal Communications, Scottish Government. For Public Service.
- Olubukola Moyo Babajide, Founder, Crystal Options Ltd and Female Techpreneur. For services to Technology, to Business and to Inclusion.
- Elisabeth Jane Baines, Senior Manager, 16-19 Funding Policy Implementation, Department for Education. For services to Education.
- Satbinder Bains, Foster Carer, City of Wolverhampton Council. For services to Foster Care.
- Hywel Thomas Baker, Managing Director, Sierra Nevada Corporation, Mission Systems UK. For services to Defence Industry Investment, to Regional Economic Development, to Veterans Support, and to National Security.
- Geoffrey Walter Ball, Owner, F.Ball and Co.Ltd. For services to Manufacturing, to the Flooring Industry and to the community in Staffordshire.
- Stuart James Balnaves, Deputy Director, Customer Service Enterprise Operations, Department for Education. For Public Service.
- John Law Bamford (Ian Bamford). For services to Amateur Golf.
- Robert Andrew Barlow, Founder and Managing Director, TDP Recycled Plastic Furniture. For services to Sustainable Manufacturing and to Charity.
- Raegan Nina Barnes (Raegan Nina Delaney), lately Headteacher, Nayland Primary School, Suffolk. For services to Education.
- Kimberley Joy Barnetson, Childminding Partner, Stronger Practice Hub, Childminders Mentor, Essex and Hertfordshire, and Tutor, ACL Training, Essex. For services to Early Years Education.
- Esther Anne Barratt, Group Director, Amentum. For services to Nuclear Power Engineering.
- Alan George Bealby, Chair, Post Office Remembrance Fellowship. For services to Heritage and Education.
- Audrey Valerie Beale, JP, Trustee and Chair, Hertfordshire Association for the Care and Rehabilitation of Offenders. For services to the Rehabilitation of Offenders and to the Administration of Justice.
- Mark Richard Beattie, JP, lately Chair of the Magistrates’ Association and Magistrate, North London Bench. For services to the Administration of Justice.
- Louise Alder Bennett (Louise Alder), Lyric Soprano. For services to Music.
- Diane Benstead, Foster Carer, East Riding Fostering Service, East Riding of Yorkshire. For services to Foster Care.
- Nicholas John Bent, Chief Executive Officer, upReach. For services to Education.
- Richard David Bernard, Headteacher, Northampton School for Boys. For services to Education.
- Margaret Ann Betts, Front of House Assistant, 10 Downing Street. For Public Service.
- Hiren Bhimjiyani, Programme Director, Global Supply Chain Intelligence Programme, Department for Business and Trade. For services to Trade, to Data-Driven Supply Chain Intelligence and to Machine Learning Innovation.
- Bridget Jane Biddell, DL, Chair, Country Land and Business Association Charitable Trust. For services to Environmental Restoration and to Charity.
- Christopher Terence Bird, Chair, Riskwell. For services to Energy Transition and to Community Development in North East Scotland.
- Graeme Michael Black, Risk Advisory Assurance Lead, Department for Work and Pensions. For services to Young People in the community of Durham.
- Dr. John Blakeley, Team Leader, Higher Education Student Accommodation and Consumer Rights Policy, Department for Education. For services to Higher Education.
- Brenda Gillian Bland. For services to Swimming in Great Britain.
- Jane Alison Blower, lately President, Association of Reproductive and Clinical Scientists. For services to Reproductive Science.
- Robert Blundell, Founder, Trust PA. For services to Spinal Cord Injury Research and Treatment.
- Margaret Andrea Boanas, Chair, International Meat Trade Association. For services to the Meat Sector, to Trade and to Promoting Opportunities for Women.
- Samuel Joseph Boardman, Specialist Engineer, Ministry of Defence. For services to Defence.
- Jonathan Mark Boddington, Founder, Silverlining Furniture. For services to Design and Innovation in Furniture Making.
- Fiona Beth Booth, Head Teacher and SENDCo, St Nicholas Church of England Primary Academy, Boston, Lincolnshire. For services to Education.
- Stewart Henry Booth, Head of Safety Assessment, AWE. For services to Defence.
- Dr. Dianne Borien, lately Interim Head of Service, Southend-on-Sea City Council. For services to Early Years Education.
- Pauline Frances Bothwell, Charity Secretary, Crossfire Trust. For services to the People of South Armagh.
- Douglas John Bott, Co-Founder, Open Up Music. For services to Disabled People.
- Andrew Charles Bowden. For services to Housing and to the community in Wales.
- George MacLeod Bowie, Broadcaster and Charity Campaigner. For services to Radio and to Charity in Glasgow and the West of Scotland.
- Jennifer Margaret Bratulic (Jennie Harrington), Artistic Scheduling Manager, English National Ballet. For Charitable Service.
- Professor Stephen James Brett, Consultant in Intensive Care Medicine, Imperial College Healthcare NHS Trust and Professor of Critical Care, Imperial College London. For services to Critical Illness and Intensive Care Medicine.
- Tania Bright, Chief Executive Officer, Home for Good and Safe Families. For services to Vulnerable Children and Families.
- Christopher David Britten, Executive Headteacher, Ysgol Y Deri School, Vale of Glamorgan. For services to Education.
- Professor Christopher Brookes, Chair, Wigan Warriors and lately Chief Medical Officer, Rugby Football League and England Rugby League. For services to Rugby League.
- James Brown, Volunteer Driver. For services to Saving Lives Scotland and to the community in Airdrie.
- Elaine Anne Chalmers-Brown, Organiser and Creator, Pilgrims Hearts. For services to the Homeless in Bracknell Forest.
- Sonia Patricia Browne, Founder, Steve Browne Foundation. For services to Young People.
- Susan Brownson, lately Deputy Headteacher, Laycock Primary School, London Borough of Islington. For services to Education.
- Caroline Bruce, lately Service Manager, Adult Services, Fife Council. For services to Supporting Vulnerable Adults in Fife.
- Nathalie Bull, Chief Executive Headteacher, The BeDifferent Federation, London. For services to Education.
- Dr. John Richard Buscombe, lately Consultant in Nuclear Medicine, Cambridge University Hospitals NHS Foundation Trust. For services to Nuclear Medicine.
- Cyril Alexander Burler, Volunteer for Hull Independent Merchant Navy Association. For services to the Merchant Navy in Hull.
- Krystyna Stefania Butwilkowska, lately Chair of Governors, Portsmouth High School, Hampshire. For services to Education.
- The Reverend Alexander Brown Cairns, Volunteer. For services to the communities of South Scotland.
- Thomas Malcolm Calvert, Senior Professional Technical Officer, Rivers Directorate, Department for Infrastructure, Northern Ireland Civil Service. For services to Flood Risk Management and to Digital Transformation.
- Theresa Cameron, Parenting Support Co-Ordinator, London Borough of Sutton. For services to the community in the London Borough of Sutton.
- Ian Campbell. For services to Women in the Philippines.
- Karen Elizabeth Canner, lately Honours Secretary and Chair, Supporting the Workplace in Menopause Staff Network, Ministry of Justice. For Public Service.
- Anne Carr, Head of Grants, Royal Navy and Royal Marines Charity. For services to Royal Navy and Royal Marines Personnel and Veterans.
- Lee Kevin Carsley, Coach, England Men’s Under-21 Football Team. For services to Association Football.
- Jessica Leigh Carter. For services to Association Football.
- Julie Carter, Owner and Principal, TipToe Stage School and Scalliwags Pre-School, South Ockendon, Essex. For services to Early Years Education and Performing Arts.
- Jeremy Paul Cartwright, Chair of the Corporation, Stoke-on-Trent College, Staffordshire. For services to Further Education.
- Valerie Isobel Castell, JP, Magistrate Avon and Somerset Bench. For services to the Administration of Justice.
- Alan William Cavill, Director of Communications and Regeneration, Blackpool Council. For services to Regeneration in Blackpool.
- Aditya Chakrabortty, Senior Economics Commentator, The Guardian. For services to Public Understanding of the Economy and Wider Social Issues.
- Barbara Rowton Chandler, Design Journalist and Photographer and Founder, Green Grads. For services to the Design Industry.
- Shawn Charlwood, Member, Executive Committee, British Dental Association. For services to Dentistry.
- Dr. Azhar Mahmood Chaudhry, General Practitioner, Thistlemoor Medical Centre, Peterborough. For services to the community in Peterborough.
- Christopher Cheek, Founder, The Bus Industry Monitor. For services to Public Transport.
- Emily Cherry, Chief Executive, Bikeability Trust. For services to Active Travel for Young People.
- Sarah Jane Chimbwandira, Chief Executive Officer, Surrey Wildlife Trust. For services to the Environment.
- Leah Rani Chowdhry, Philanthropist. For services to Charitable Fundraising.
- Elizabeth Anne Clark, Specialist Prosecutor, Crown Prosecution Service. For services to Law and Order.
- Iain Clark, DL, Intranet Manager, Scottish Parliament. For services to the Scottish Parliament.
- Neil James Clark, Volunteer. For services to Charity and to Young People.
- Matthew Philip Lindsey-Clark, Treasurer, Royal Horticultural Society. For services to Horticulture and to Philanthropy.
- Alexandra Clements, Media Liaison Administrator and lately Cancer Awareness Roadshow Health Awareness Volunteer. For Charitable Service.
- Nigel Frederick Coates, lately Director of the Business Clinic, Northumbria University. For services to Higher Education and to Business.
- Dean Simon Benjamin Cohen, Councillor, London Borough of Barnet. For services to Charity and to the community in North West London.
- James Harry William Coles, Team Leader, Moffat Mountain Rescue Team. For services to Mountain Rescue.
- Nicola Margaret Collett, lately Partnership Development Manager, Leicester City School Sport Partnership. For services to School Sport and Physical Education and to the communities in Leicester City and Leicestershire.
- Lucy Elizabeth Owen-Collins, Founder and Director, Bee in the Woods, Brighton and Hove. For services to Early Years Education.
- Mary Colwell, Founder and Director, Curlew Action. For services to Nature.
- Daniel Connolly, Officer, National Crime Agency. For services to Law Enforcement.
- Krysten Michael Francis Coombs, Athlete and Trustee, Dwarf Sports Association UK. For services to Badminton and to the Dwarf Sports Association.
- Andrew Mark Cooper, Managing Director, GE Vernova, Power Conversion and Storage. For services to Manufacturing and to Defence.
- Fay Susan Cornwell, Senior Lawyer, H.M. Revenue and Customs. For services to Benefits Recipients.
- Nicholas Corrigan, Founder and Chief Executive Officer, Media Academy Cymru. For services to Children and Young People.
- Phillip Edwin Corsi, lately Area Operations Manager, Royal National Lifeboat Institution. For services to Maritime Safety.
- Neil Cotterill, Community Engagement Advisor, Department for Work and Pensions. For services to the Youth Community of North Staffordshire.
- Kathleen Elizabeth Courtenay, lately Head of Children and Disability Services, Southern Health & Social Care Trust. For services to People with Disabilities.
- Mhari Faye Coxon, President and Trustee, Oral Health Foundation. For services to Oral Health.
- Gordon John Cresswell. For services to the Payroll Profession.
- Dr. Amanda Hensman-Crook, Consultant Physiotherapist. For services to Physiotherapy.
- Angela Crookall, Customer Service Leader, Department for Work and Pensions. For services to Ex-Offenders and to Working to Reduce Homelessness.
- Alan William Crooks, Disability Manager, Irish Football Association. For services to Disability Football.
- Natalie Cumming, Campaigner. For services to Holocaust Remembrance and to the Missing People Charity.
- Dr. Mark Brian Dale, Principal and Chief Executive Officer, Portland College, Nottinghamshire. For services to Further Education.
- David Alan Dalton, Chief Executive Officer, British Glass. For services to the Glass Industry.
- Matthew Davenport, Team Leader, Ministry of Defence. For services to Defence.
- Gary Davies, Youth Justice Practitioner, Community First Responder and lately Police Officer. For services to Public Safety.
- Robert Francis-Davies, Councillor and Cabinet Member, Swansea Council. For Public Service.
- Jane Dean, Volunteer Member of the Nottingham Special Events Committee, Cancer Research UK. For services to Charitable Fundraising.
- Jonathan James Dean, Chair, Horsham Roundabout Talking Newspaper. For services to Blind and Partially Sighted Residents of Horsham.
- Albert Thomas Deane, lately Investigator, Independent Commission for the Location of Victims’ Remains. For Public Service.
- Gordon James Scott Deans, Chair, Orkney2025. For services to Sport and to Island Communities.
- Jonathan Myles Maxwell Dodd, Lifeboat Volunteer, Royal National Lifeboat Institution. For Voluntary Service.
- Alan Dootson, Development Manager, Sheffield Co-Operative Development Group. For services to Co-Operatives in the City of Sheffield.
- Dr. Mark Edward Antony Downs, lately Chief Executive, Royal Society for Biology. For services to Biology.
- Patricia Ann Drake. For services to the community in East Sussex.
- Ian Henry Drysdale, Deputy Chief Officer, Kent Police. For services to Policing.
- Brian Duff, lately Principal, Carnmoney Primary School, Newtownabbey. For services to Education in Newtownabbey.
- Alison Dunn, Chief Executive Officer, Citizens Advice Gateshead and Executive Director, Society Matters CIC. For services to the community in the North East of England.
- Ivor William McKee Dunne, Prison Officer, Northern Ireland Prison Service. For services to Criminal Justice and the Rehabilitation of Offenders in Northern Ireland.
- Shevelle Lloyd Richard Dynott, Dancer. For services to Classical Dance and to Young People.
- Victoria Hannah Arnott Eadie, Chair, Bolder Academy, Isleworth, London Borough of Hounslow. For services to Education.
- Neil Andrew Eastwood, Founder and Chief Executive, Care Friends. For services to Adults and Children’s Social Care.
- Sarah Eberle. For services to Horticulture.
- Victoria Jayne Eccleston, Senior Probation Officer, National Probation Service. For services to Women on Probation.
- Brian Roy Heron-Edmends, Deputy County Commissioner, St John Ambulance. For voluntary services to St John Ambulance.
- Jenny Barbara Ellis, Founder, NextJenSecurity. For services to Cyber Policy.
- Nicola Jane Ellis, Assistant Principal for Student Engagement and Support, Buckinghamshire College Group. For services to Further Education.
- David Emanuel, Ambassador and Fundraiser, Macmillan. For Charitable Service.
- David Charles Euridge, Chief Executive Officer, Inclusive Education Trust. For services to Education.
- Professor Dafydd Gareth Richard Evans, Emeritus Professor of Medical Genetics, University of Manchester and Consultant in Medical Genetics, Manchester University NHS Foundation Trust. For services to Cancer Genetics.
- The Reverend Canon Glyn Evans. For services to the community in Morpeth, Northumberland.
- Stephen Charles Evans. For services to the community in Bristol.
- Colin Paul Everett. For Public Service.
- Dr. Deborah Faint, General Practitioner, Brownlow Health. For services to General Practice for People Experiencing Homelessness in Liverpool.
- Hannah Faulkner, Head of Pan-London Rough Sleeping Services and Prevention, St Mungo’s. For services to Tackling Homelessness. Ursula FAY. For services to the community in County Antrim.
- Thomas Patrick Fennelly. For services to Search and Rescue.
- Alison Blanche Field, President, Royal Forestry Society. For services to Forestry.
- Joana Figueiredo (Jane Figueiredo), Diving Coach. For services to Diving.
- George Alexander Fleming, Chair, Fleming Agri Products. For services to Business, to Employment and to Apprenticeships.
- Tom Gregory Simon Fogden, Chief Operating Officer, Ada National College for Digital Skills, London. For services to Further Education.
- Nuala Anne Fox, Trustee, London and Slough Charitable Trust. For services to Homeless People.
- Heather Jane Frankham, DL, Founder, Bud Systems. For services to Education and Skills.
- Louise Joanne Ellis-Frankland, Chief Executive Officer, Mansfield Pollard & Co Ltd. For services to the Manufacturing Sector and to Employee Well-Being.
- Alloysius Jonathan Frederick, Chair of Trustees, All Saints’ Multi-Academy Trust, London. For services to Education.
- Brian Peter Freemantle, lately Head of Rolling Stock Contracts and Policy Delivery, Department for Transport. For services to the Railway Network.
- Sara Jane Barr-Frost, Deputy Chief Nursing and Allied Health Professionals Officer, Pennine Care NHS Foundation Trust and Lately Director of Nursing and Allied Health Professionals, Wrightington, Wigan and Leigh NHS Foundation Trust. For services to the NHS.
- Camilla Louise Fyfe (Milly Fyfe), Founder, No Fuss Meals for Busy Parents. For services to Farmers and to Family Nutrition.
- Corinne Ann Galletly, lately Macmillan Team Lead, NHS Grampian. For services to Nurse-led Cancer Services in Moray.
- John Anthony Garbett, Foster Carer, Telford Children’s Service, Telford and Wrekin Council. For services to Foster Care and to Children with Disabilities and their Families.
- Pamela Yvonne Garbett, Foster Carer, Telford Children’s Service, Telford and Wrekin Council. For services to Foster Care and to Children with Disabilities and their Families.
- David Alun Gardner, Assistant Chief Commissioner, St John Ambulance Cymru. For services to the community in Newtown, Powys.
- Dr. Jane Ann Gate, Executive Director, The Association of Innovation, Research and Technology Organisations. For services to Science and the Innovation Ecosystem.
- Maurice Henry Geddis, Co-Founder and Co-Chair, Avondale Foods Ltd. and ENE Ltd. For services to Innovation and Entrepreneurship in Northern Ireland.
- Helene Martin Gee, Founder and President, Savvitas Limited. For services to Women in Enterprise.
- Susan Melody George, Founder, Lasting Life. For Charitable Service.
- Fay Gibbery (Faye Toogood), Designer. For services to Design and Fashion.
- Christine Susan Gibbons, Trustee, Parkrun Global. For services to Community Sport and Fitness.
- Kathryn Lorna Gibbs, Deputy Director, Improving Public Engagement Division, Scottish Government. For Public Service.
- Jacquelyn Elizabeth Gitau, Director, African Families in the UK. For services to Migrant Families in Oxfordshire.
- Ian William John Glendinning, Managing Director, Irish Grouse Conservation Trust. For services to Country Sports and to Conservation.
- Nicholas Goddard, Technical Lead, UK Submarine Superiority, Defence Science and Technology Laboratory. For services to Defence.
- Caterina Anita Elena Goodhart, Founder, London School of Picture and Frame Conservation. For services to Conservation and Heritage Crafts.
- Joanne Gordon, Chair, Forces Additional Needs and Disabilities Forum Committee. For voluntary service to Service Personnel and their Families.
- Kyle Gordon, Police Sergeant, British Transport Police. For services to Transport Policing.
- Sandra Louise Gordon. For services to Equity, Representation and to the community in Bristol.
- Samantha-Louise Gough. For services to Sport and to the Visually Impaired Community.
- Maureen Greene, Foster Carer, Peterborough City Council. For services to Foster Care.
- Stephen Greene, Foster Carer, Peterborough City Council. For services to Foster Care.
- Dr. Howard Greenwood. For services to Nuclear Waste Management.
- Dr. Arun Kumar Gupta, Consultant in Anaesthesia and NeuroCritical Care, Cambridge University Hospitals NHS Foundation Trust, Director, Cambridge Digital Health and Surgical Training Centre and Affiliated Associate Professor, University of Cambridge. For services to Medical Education.
- Professor Sunil Gupta, Photographer, Activist and Writer. For services to Art and to the LGBTQ+ Communities.
- Imran Hafeez, Head, National Literacy Trust Bradford Hub. For services to Literacy Development and Social Inclusion in Bradford, West Yorkshire.
- Timothy Raymond Hall, Councillor and Chair, Surrey County Council. For Public Service.
- Hannah Alice Hampton. For services to Association Football.
- Heather Joanne Harrison, Data Assurance Manager, Ministry of Defence. For services to Defence.
- Polly Harrow, Assistant Principal, Kirklees College, Huddersfield, West Yorkshire. For services to Further Education.
- Jane Victoria Harvey, Tennis Official. For services to Tennis.
- Sarah Hassan. For services to Public Libraries and Reading.
- Annette Hay, Head of Equality, Diversity and Inclusion, De Montfort University. For services to Higher Education.
- David Francis Heggarty, Principal, Cregagh Primary School and Deaf Unit. For services to Education in Northern Ireland.
- Dr. Carolyn Michelle Heitmeyer, Head of Social Sciences, Government Office for Science. For services to Social Science.
- Debbie-Anne Henderson, Yard Manager, Tower Farm Riding School. For services to Equestrianism and to the community in Edinburgh and the South of Scotland.
- Emma Jane Hewitt, Skills Lead, Plymouth City Council. For services to Skills.
- Anthony Hill, Physical Education Officer, H.M. Prison Stafford, H.M. Prison and Probation Service. For Public Service.
- Jonathan Mark Hindle, President EMEA, Krueger International Europe. For services to the Furniture Industry.
- Anne Lynette Holland, Front of House Assistant, 10 Downing Street. For Public Service.
- David Michael Holmes, Author and Broadcaster. For services to Film, Media and to Charity.
- Tom Hooper, Head of Sport, Bristol Metropolitan Academy, Fishponds, Bristol. For services to Education.
- Christopher Howarth, Head of Customer Service for Tax Credits, H.M. Revenue and Customs. For Public Service.
- Timothy Howson. For services to the community in Herefordshire.
- Sali Hughes, Co-Founder, Beauty Banks. For services to the Alleviation of Hygiene Poverty.
- Stephen John Hughson. For services to Agriculture and to Tourism and Events in Wales.
- Naomi Michelle Hulston, Chief Executive Officer, Catch22. For services to Young People.
- Simon John Humphrey. For services to the Environment.
- Susan Elizabeth Hunter. For services to the community in York.
- Georgina Hurcombe, Founder and Managing Director, LoveLove Films. For services to Television and the Creative Sector.
- Linda Hurst, Foster Carer, Liverpool Children’s Social Care, Liverpool City Council. For services to Foster Care.
- Pamela Ann Margaret Hussain, National Caseworker, International Family Tracing, British Red Cross. For services to the British Red Cross.
- Dorothy Lena Ind, Founder, Chelsea Ballet Schools. For services to Dance Education.
- Dr. Anthony Frank Iommi, Musician and Co-Founder, Black Sabbath. For services to Music and to Charity.
- Paul Michael Jackson, Founder and Global Chair, Astus Group and Chair, Off the Ropes Charity. For Charitable Service.
- Lauren Elizabeth James. For services to Association Football.
- Dr. Samuel John Jenkins, Deputy Head, Public Records and Archives, Cabinet Office. For Public Service.
- Michelle John, Director, Parental Education Growth Support. For services to Family Support and Advocacy.
- John Irwin Dickey Johnston, JP. For services to Local History in Northern Ireland and the Adjoining Border Counties.
- Clifford William Jones. For services to Welsh Football.
- Eric George Henry Jones, Retired and Volunteer Teacher. For services to Young People and to Education.
- Joanne Laura Jones, Co-Founder, Beauty Banks. For services to the Alleviation of Hygiene Poverty.
- John Morris Jones. For services to the Heavy Goods Vehicle and Logistics Industry.
- Karen Jones, DL. For Public Service.
- Karen Jones, Chair, Netball South West and England Netball Honorary Life Member. For services to Netball in England.
- Kiera Louise Jones, Lead Nurse, Skanda Vale Hospice. For services to Nursing.
- Vincent Stuart Jones, Police Staff, West Midlands Police. For services to the community in the West Midlands.
- Ann Sylvia Jordan, Deputy Vice-Chancellor, University of Worcester. For services to Education.
- Gordon John Kane, Curriculum Area Manager, Advanced Technologies, Northern Regional College. For services to Further and Higher Education in Northern Ireland.
- Elaine Jill Kelman, lately Head, Michael Palin Centre for Stammering. For services to Speech and Language Therapy.
- Reuben Kench, Chair, Stockton and Darlington Rail Heritage Partnership. For services to Heritage.
- Marian Kennedy, lately Headteacher, Crampton Primary School, London Borough of Southwark. For services to Education.
- Sundas Khalid, Co-Founder and Director, Association of South Asian Midwives. For services to Charity and to Healthcare.
- Nadia Zunobia Khan, Founder and Chief Executive Officer, Women in CTRL. For services to Women in the Music Industry.
- Kathleen Kimber, lately Chair of Governors, Derwen College, Shropshire. For services to Further Education.
- Robert Bruce Kindness. For services to the River Carron Salmon Stock Restoration Programme
- Mark Beverley King, Fellow of the Institute of Tourist Guiding, Life Fellow and lately Chair, The British Guild of Tourist Guides. For services to Tourism.
- Dr. Alys Cole-King. For services to Suicide Prevention.
- Andrea Kinver, Strategy and Insight Lead, Scottish Government. For Public Service.
- Adrian Phillip Kneeshaw, Chief Executive Officer, Carlton Academy Trust, Bradford, West Yorkshire. For services to Education.
- Nicholas Knight. For services to Education and to the community in Hampshire.
- Joseph Knowles, Volunteer, Action Earth. For Voluntary Service.
- Sakilbabu Vali Kola, Founder and Director, Bri-Tek Technologies LTD. For services to Export Growth.
- Dr. Susan Lagdon, Senior Lecturer in Psychology, Ulster University. For services to Ending Violence Against Women and Girls.
- Stuart Vance Laidler, Operations Manager, Serco Maritime Services, H.M. Naval Base Portsmouth. For services to the Royal Navy.
- Chadwick Clive Lake, County Chair, Greater London Middlesex West Scouts. For services to Scouting.
- Richard Maxwell Lamb (Max Lamb), Product and Furniture Designer. For services to Design and Craft.
- Dr. Diane Victoria Laverty, lately Macmillan Nurse Consultant in Palliative and End of Life Care, London Ambulance Service NHS Trust. For services to Palliative Care Nursing.
- Alison Lawson, BEM, Deputy STRAP Security Officer, Department for Energy Security and Net Zero and Department for Science Innovation and Technology. For Public Service.
- Dr. Becki Lawson, Senior Research Fellow, Institute of Zoology Zoological Society of London. For services to Wildlife Health.
- David Nathan Leighton, Administrative Officer, Crown Prosecution Service. For services to the community in the North West.
- Karl Lester. For voluntary services to Mountain Rescue.
- Margaret Anne Lester, County Adviser and lately County Commissioner, Girlguiding Durham North and Northumberland. For services to Girlguiding.
- Professor Stephen Howard Leveson, Founder and Trustee, York Against Cancer. For services to Cancer Patients in North Yorkshire.
- Michael Howard Levy, Volunteer Educator and Author. For services to Holocaust Education.
- Deborah Lewis, Founder, Covid19FamiliesUK. For services to Bereavement Support.
- Jamie Lewis, Chief Executive Officer, HEY Smile Foundation. For voluntary services to the community in Yorkshire.
- Roger Charles Lewis, Chair, Churchill Lines Foundation. For voluntary services to Service Personnel and Veterans.
- Dr. Simon James Lewis, Medical Director, Magpas Air Ambulance. For services to Emergency Care.
- Robyn Llewellyn, Director, England, Midlands and East, The National Lottery Heritage Fund. For services to Heritage.
- Shuvo Loha. For Parliamentary and Political Service.
- Steven Richard Joe Lord, Operations Officer, Defence Nuclear Organisation. For services to Defence.
- Ian Nicholas Lovett, lately President, England and Wales Cricket Board. For services to Cricket and to Charity.
- Richard Lyttle. For services to the Horse Racing Industry.
- Lou Macari, lately Footballer and Founder, Macari Foundation. For services to Association Football and to Homeless People in Stoke-on-Trent.
- David Isbister MacAskill, DL, Coxswain, Lochinver Lifeboat. For services to the community in West Sutherland.
- Duncan MacDonald, Team Leader, Ministry of Defence. For services to Defence.
- Sharon Machin, Knowledge and Information Liaisons Manager, Founder and Chair of Ability Network, Office of the Public Guardian. For services to Inclusion.
- Dr. Roderick MacKenzie, Consultant in Emergency Medicine and Pre-hospital Emergency Medicine, Cambridge University Hospitals NHS Foundation Trust. For services to Pre-Hospital Emergency Medicine.
- Thelma Viona Anderson MacKenzie, Special Police Constable, Northern Constabulary, The Police Service of Scotland. For Voluntary and Public Service to the community in Thurso, Caithness.
- Helen Millie Mackie, Assistant Director, Facilities Management, The University of St Andrews. For services to Apprenticeships and Facilities Management in Higher Education.
- Paul Anthony Mackings. For services to Business and to the community in the North East of England.
- Joy Alison Madeiros, Group Chief Executive Officer, Oasis Charitable Trust and Founding Member, Women’s Faith Forum. For services to Education and to Faith Relations.
- Sanjiv Mahajan, Supporting Editor, 2025 United Nations System of National Accounts. For services to Economic Statistics.
- Mark John Mair, Volunteer Chair, Morayvia Aerospace Centre. For services to Heritage, to Tourism and to the community in Moray.
- Mark Vincent Major, Chief Executive, Northamptonshire Carers. For services to Carers.
- Anjum Nahid Malik, Writer and Lecturer. For services to British South Asian Arts.
- Russell John Manning, lately Chair, Leeds Jewish Welfare Board. For services to the Jewish Community and to Charity.
- Terence March, Honorary Treasurer, Chartered Institution of Wastes Management South West Centre. For services to Education in Waste and Resource Management.
- James Paul Markey, Founder, UNI SIM. For services to the Technology Sector.
- Samuel Adrian Russell Markillie, Chair, Water Management Alliance. For services to Flood Risk Management.
- Ian Brian Marson, lately Digital Product Manager, Home Office. For services to Migration and Borders Technology.
- Paul Emerson Martenstyn, Vice-President, Save the Children UK and Founder Member, Africa Advisory Board. For Charitable Service.
- Helen Jane Martin, Managing Director Innovation and Investment, Scottish Enterprise. For services to the Scottish Economy.
- Esperanza Gomez-Martinez, Offensive Weapons Policy Manager, Home Office. For services to the Prevention of Knife Crime.
- Jameson Mashakada, Head of VAT Deductions Policy Team, H.M. Revenue and Customs. For services to Race Equality, Diversity and Inclusion.
- Colin James Mason, Volunteer Organiser, Volunteering Matters. For Voluntary Service.
- Parvinder Kaur Matharu, Co-Founder, clothsurgeon. For services to Men’s Fashion and Tailoring.
- Ravinder Singh Matharu, Co-Founder and Creative Director, clothsurgeon. For services to Men’s Fashion and Tailoring. Jean-Paul Edouard Maunick, Musician, Composer and Producer. For services to Music.
- Justin Alexander Maws (Alex Maws), Head of Education and Heritage, Association of Jewish Refugees. For services to Holocaust Education and Remembrance.
- Dr. Michael McBrien, Consultant Anaesthetist, Belfast Health and Social Care Trust. For Voluntary Service.
- Kerry Lesley McCafferty, Chief People Officer, St Mungo’s. For services to Charity and to People Leadership.
- Constance McCready, Founder, Covid-19 Families Scotland. For services to Bereavement Support.
- Agnes Jane McCullough. For services to the Art of Lacemaking and Needlecraft in Northern Ireland.
- Norma May Anderson McGovern. For services to Charity.
- Jill McGrath, Chief Executive Officer, YMCA Tayside. For services to Young People across Perth and Kinross.
- Maria Angela McNicoll, Development Manager, St Giles. For services to Prisons and Prisoners.
- Peter Stuart Merry, Deputy Principal and Chief Executive, City of Wolverhampton College. For services to Further Education.
- Graham Douglas Metcalfe, lately Partnership Manager, Department for Work and Pensions. For Public Service.
- Dr. Heidi Louise Meyer, Master, The Lord Leycester Hospital. For services to Heritage.
- Winston Russel Michael, Chair and Trustee, Kent Challenger Games. For services to Inclusivity and Sport in Kent.
- Caroline Agnes Millar, Sector Lead, Scottish Agritourism. For services to Agritourism and to the Rural Economy in Scotland.
- Gary Millar, Alderman and Business Ambassador. For services to Business and to International Relations.
- Paul Robert Millar. For services to Architecture and the Arts in Northern Ireland.
- Kimberly Ann Klug-Miller, Community Partnerships Manager, Community Access Scheme, Historic Royal Palaces. For services to Community Access to Heritage.
- Valerie Anne Mills, Chair, Barnsley Premier Leisure. For services to the community in Barnsley.
- Charles Stephen Milne, DL, Managing Director, Regency Group. For services to Business and to Community Development in Buckie and Banffshire.
- Sally Jane Miner, Member, Primary Learning Trust and former Executive Headteacher, Ryders Hayes School, Walsall, West Midlands. For services to Education.
- Linda Minnis, Chief Executive Officer, Charities Trust. For services to the Charitable Sector.
- Hazel Margaret Moody, Director of Childcare, Advantage Day Nursery, Surbiton, Royal Borough of Kingston upon Thames. For services to Early Years Childcare.
- Rhian Moore, Chief Volunteer of Wales, The Scouts. For services to Young People.
- Ryan Lee Moore. For services to Horseracing and to British Sport.
- William Robert Lyon Moore, DL. For services to the Agriculture Sector in Northern Ireland.
- Chloe Maggie Kelly-Moore (Chloe Kelly). For services to Association Football.
- Richard Mark Morris, Head of GB Para Badminton. For services to Sport and Disabled People.
- Joanna Fleur Morrow, Deputy Secretary and Executive Director of Student, Academic and Corporate Service, University of Stirling. For services to Education.
- John Stanley Mottram. For services to Mountain and Cave Rescue.
- Anne Geraldine Moylan, Advanced Neonatal Nurse Practitioner, Lecturer and Programme Leader in Neonatal Nursing. For services to Neonatal Practice and Education.
- Stewart William Muir, lately Policy Officer, Department for Environment, Food and Rural Affairs. For services to Wildlife Conservation.
- Professor Andrew Mumford, Emeritus Professor of Genomic Medicine, University of Bristol. For services to Genomic Medicine.
- David Macleod Murdoch, Philanthropist. For services to Charity.
- Michael Paul Murray, Armed Forces Champion, Department for Work and Pensions. For services to the Armed Forces Community in London.
- Benash Nazmeen, Co-Founder and Director, Association of South Asian Midwives. For services to Charity and to Healthcare.
- Jayne Nendrick. For services to the community in Withernsea and South East Holderness, East Yorkshire.
- Dr. Patrick John Newberyy, Chair, Historic England Audit and Risk Assurance Committee and Chair, Cornwall College. For services to Heritage and to Education.
- Professor Ghulam Andre Ng, Head of Department, Cardiovascular Sciences, University of Leicester and President, British Cardiovascular Society. For services to Medical Research and Healthcare.
- Ian Nicolson, Volunteer. For services to Sailing.
- Brian O'Hagan. For services to Health and Social Care in Northern Ireland.
- Julius O'Riordan (Judge Jules), DJ and Broadcaster. For services to Music, to Entertainment Law and to Young People.
- Lewis Orchant. For services to the Jewish Community in Glasgow.
- Claire Oxlade, lately Private Secretary to the UK Special Envoy on Antimicrobial Resistance, Department of Health and Social Care. For services to Global Health.
- Alexandria Page, Engagement Staff Officer, HQ London District, Ministry of Defence. For services to Defence.
- Andrew Graham Page, Wildlife Ranger Manager, Forestry Commission. For services to Forestry.
- Dakshesh Harivadan Parikh, lately Consultant Paediatric Surgeon, Birmingham Women’s and Children’s NHS Foundation Trust. For services to Paediatric Surgery.
- Susan Karen Parsonage, Chief Executive, Wokingham Borough Council. For services to Local Government.
- Dr. Stefania Passamonte, Classical Artist and President of London Performing Academy of Music. For services to Music.
- Dr. Kavitha Pasunuru, Consultant Child and Adolescent Psychiatrist and Divisional Director, Aneurin Bevan University Health Board. For services to Neurodiversity Services in Gwent.
- Penelope Anne Paterson, Senior Inspector, Havering School Improvement Services, London Borough of Havering. For services to Education.
- Leonard Donald Pattinson, lately Foster Carer, Kirklees Council. For services to Foster Care.
- Pamela Mary Pattinson, lately Foster Carer, Kirklees Council. For services to Foster Care.
- Matthew Pavitt, Divisional Commander for East Anglia and South-East England, H.M. Coastguard. For services to Maritime Safety.
- Margaret Anne Pedder. For services to Armed Forces Families.
- Jeremy John Harley Penn, Chair, Marine Society and Sea Cadets. For services to Young People.
- Philippa Ruth Penney. For services to Church Bell Ringing and to Young People.
- Anthony Roy Perkins, Chief Executive, The London Hostels Association London Ltd. For services to Housing and to Supporting Young People.
- Michael Phipps, Communities Strategic Lead, Greater Manchester Violence Reduction Unit. For services to Young People.
- Edwin Piercy, Volunteer, Hull Independent Merchant Navy Association. For services to the Merchant Navy in Hull.
- Amy Lauren Pistol (Amy Wagner), Director, Tackling Antisemitism in Education Programme, Palace Yard. For services to the Jewish Community.
- Martin Howard Pitt, Chair, Radius Housing Association. For services to Social Housing.
- Neil Bernard Platt, Clinical Director, Beacon Counselling Trust. For services to Vulnerable People and to Mental Health.
- Elizabeth Jayne Plummer, Chief of Staff to the Leader of the Liberal Democrats, House of Lords. For services to Parliament.
- Dr. Patricia Podmore, Consultant, Western Health Trust. For services to Dermatology in the Northwest of Northern Ireland.
- Allison Kathryn Louise Potter, Manager, National Literacy Trust Middlesbrough Hub. For services to the community in Middlesbrough.
- Cherry Povall, JP, Councillor, Wirral Council. For services to Local Government and to the Magistracy.
- Merrill Powell, Volunteer, Women2Win and Conservative Women’s Organisation. For Political Service.
- Liam Benjamin Preston, BEM, Co-Founder, Dads Still Standing. For services to the Baby Loss Community.
- Elizabeth Jane Prince, Business Manager, Amiqus, Founder, G into Gaming and Co-Founder, Empower Up. For services to the Games Industry and to Diversity.
- Alisoun Ruth Probert, Work Coach, Department for Work and Pensions. For services to the Deaf Community.
- Dr. Colin Duncan Prosser, Principal Specialist Geoheritage and Geoconservation, Natural England. For services to Geoconservation.
- Beena Puri, Digital Equity Senior Principal, Greater Manchester Combined Authority. For services to Digital Inclusion.
- David Andrew Radcliffe. For services to Education and to the community in Coleraine, County Londonderry.
- David Andrew Radford. For services to Epilepsy Care and to the community in Chesterfield and North East Derbyshire.
- Amanda Radley, Child Exploitation Subject Matter Expert, British Transport Police. For services to Vulnerable Children and Adults.
- Suzanne Elizabeth Raine, Trustee, Imperial War Museum. For services to Heritage.
- Helen Ralph, Team Leader, Ministry of Defence. For services to Defence.
- Professor Lakshminarayan Rao Ranganath, Trustee and Co-Founder, Alkaptonuria Society. For services to People with Alkaptonuria.
- Pamela Christine Rawling, lately Education for Sustainable Development Manager, Early Years and Childcare, The Education People. For services to Early Years and Education for Sustainable Development.
- Paul Rawlinson, lately Chair, Barts Charity. For services to Health Sector Charities.
- Diane Joan Redfern, Chair, Group Organiser and Host, South Bucks Riding for the Disabled Group. For services to Disabled Riders.
- William Thomas Reeves, Chief Executive, Portland Port. For services to the community in Portland.
- Pandora Reilly, Team Leader, Ministry of Defence. For services to Defence. Anneka RICE, Broadcaster. For services to Charity and to Broadcasting.
- Beryl Catherine Richards, Film and Television Director. For services to Children’s Television.
- Jamie Richards, Founder and Chief Executive, AEDdonate. For services to Sudden Cardiac Arrest Awareness.
- Garry John Richardson, Broadcaster. For services to Sport Broadcasting.
- Dr. Nicholas James Ricahrdson, Head of Exploration and New Ventures, North Sea Transition Authority. For services to Energy Security and the Energy Transition.
- Simon Paul Richardson, lately Ceremonials Project Manager, Department for Culture, Media and Sport. For Public Service.
- Lisa Jane Riley, Actor. For services to Drama and to Charity.
- Professor Mykaell Riley, Director for The Black Music Research Unit and Principal Investigator for Bass Culture Research, University of Westminster. For services to Research and Education around Black British Music.
- Dr. Nadeem Hasan Rizvi, Managing Director, Laser Micromachining. For services to Industrial Laser Applications in Manufacturing.
- Joanne Karen Roberts, Founder and Chief Executive Officer, The Wilderness Foundation UK. For Charitable Service.
- Karen Sian Roberts, Co-Founder, The Game Change Project CIC. For services to Young People.
- Megan Jones Roberts, Senior Advisor, Community First. For services to the community in Aberystwyth.
- Professor Peter Kenneth John Robertson, Professor of Energy and Environmental Engineering, School of Chemistry and Chemical Engineering, Queen’s University Belfast. For services to Research and Innovation in Northern Ireland.
- Dr. Nicola Jayne Robinson, Volunteer Chair and Lead Coach, North West Pentathlon Hub. For services to Pentathlon.
- John Paul Rochford, Liveryman, Worshipful Company of Gardeners. For services to Horticulture.
- Dr. Martin John Rolles, Clinical Oncologist, Swansea Bay University Health Board. For services to Healthcare Science and Cancer.
- Pino De Rosa, Managing Director, Bridgeway Consulting Ltd. For services to the Railway Industry.
- Mark Andrew Rowlands, Operations Director, Leidos UK Limited. For services to Defence.
- Louise Claire Rowley, Group Principal, University Centre Somerset College Group. For services to Further Education.
- Richard Rowsell, Coastguard Team Leader, Bexhill Coastguard. For voluntary service to Maritime Safety.
- Becky Ruddy, Programme Director Fuel Cycle Area, NRS Dounreay. For services to Women in the Nuclear Industry.
- Professor Clare Rusbridge, Professor of Veterinary Neurology, University of Surrey. For services to Animal Welfare and to the Veterinary Profession.
- Alessia Mia Teresa Russo. For services to Association Football.
- Karen Alice Salter (Kay Salter), Volunteer, The Falcon Spartak Gymnastics Club. For services to Disabled People and to the community in Bexley.
- Neil Anthony Salter, Chair of the Board of Trustees, Avon Scouts. For services to Scouting.
- Mark Anthony Santos, Executive Director, Positive East. For services to People with HIV.
- Dr. Juliet Rose Bagaya Sargeant, Garden Designer, Juliet Sargeant Gardens and Landscapes. For services to Horticulture.
- Ronald William Sawford, Co-Founder and lately Managing Director, Teamwork Trust and Co-Founder Hansa Class UK. For services to Charity and to Disabled People.
- David Ian Sawkins, Deputy Harbour Master, Strategy and Support, Orkney Islands Council. For services to Port and Harbour Development and to Environmental Management.
- Professor Richard John Scaife, Regional Development Director, The Advanced Manufacturing Research Centre. For services to Manufacturing.
- Shekeila Adina Courtnie Scarlett, lately Governor, Stoke Newington School and Sixth Form, London Borough of Hackney. For services to Education.
- Carl Edgar Scott, Founder, Project Youth CIC. For services to the Protection of Young People.
- Paul Mark Seddon, Strategic Director of Planning and Transport, Nottingham City Council. For services to Town Planning.
- George Edward Spencer Seligman. For services to the Environment.
- Abigail Shapiro, Co-Founder, The Tutor Trust. For services to Education.
- Kamal Jit Sharma, Managing Director, Hindu Cultural Society of Bradford. For services to the community in Bradford, West Yorkshire.
- Susan Sharp, Interim Chair, Disabled Persons Transport Advisory Committee. For services to Accessibility in Transport.
- Craig Simmons. For services to Charitable Causes and to the community in Oxford.
- Raymond André Simonson, Chief Executive Officer, JW3. For services to Jewish Communities and to Community Cohesion.
- Alison Simpson, Information Manager, Ophthalmology Department, NHS Tayside. For services to Scottish Ophthalmology.
- Juliet Margaret Pennington Singer. For services to Charitable Causes.
- Neerasha Singh, Headteacher, Northfleet Nursery School, Kent. For services to Early Years Education.
- Anne Margaret Slade, Chief Operational Officer, The Pioneer Academy, Keston, London Borough of Bromley. For services to Education.
- Richard William Sloan, Education Advisor, Confederation of School Trusts. For services to Education.
- The Venerable Wilhelmina Tokcumboh Smallman, lately Archdeacon of Southend and Campaigner. For services to Social Justice and to Women’s Safety.
- Clive Douglas Smith, Honorary Life Vice-President and lately National Equine Lead, Riding for the Disabled Association. For voluntary services to Disabled Riders.
- Pauline Smith, Chief Executive Officer, CXK. For services to Education, Skills and Employability.
- Dr. Richard Peter Smith, Technical Specialist, Environment Agency. For services to Soil Health.
- Shirley Kathryn Smith, Founder and Trustee, If U Care Share Foundation. For services to Suicide Prevention.
- Dr. Stephen Michael Smith, Executive Director, CO2RE and Associate Professor of Greenhouse Gas Removal, University of Oxford. For services to Climate Science.
- Evelyn Elizabeth Jean Smyth, Medicines Management Specialist Nurse, Southern Health & Social Care Trust. For services to Health and Social Care.
- David Paul Snape. For Parliamentary and Political Service.
- Rabbi Dr. Norman Solomon. For services to the Jewish Community and to Interfaith Relations in Oxfordshire.
- Tracy Sortwell, JP, Magistrate and Chair, Magistrates’ Association’s Family Court Committee. For services to the Administration of Justice.
- Professor John Martin Sparrow, lately Honorary Professor of Ophthalmic Health Services Research and Applied Epidemiology, University of Bristol. For services to Ophthalmology.
- Heather Jayne Spence, Interim Chair for Northern Ireland, Royal British Legion. For voluntary services to Veterans.
- Dr. Diana Springall, Textile Artist. For services to Arts and Crafts.
- Paul Stacey, Founder and Artistic Director, Reading Rep Theatre. For services to Theatre.
- Barrie John Stephenson, Trustee, Restore. For services to People Experiencing Homelessness in York.
- Gary Stevens, Chair, Focus SB. For services to Manufacturing, to International Trade and to Apprenticeships.
- Frederick Michael Stewart. For services to Military History in Northern Ireland.
- Mary Anne Stewart, Founder, Kintyre Food Bank. For services to the community in Campbeltown.
- Philip Brett Stocker, Chief Executive Officer, National Sheep Association. For services to Farming and to Animal Welfare.
- Jonathan David Stokes, Director of Trees, Science and Research, The Tree Council. For services to Tree Conservation.
- Andrew Street, Chair of Trustees, FareShare South West. For services to Disadvantaged People in Bristol.
- Gary Street, lately Head Coach, England Women’s Rugby. For services to Rugby Union.
- Jennifer Swain, Managing Director, Road to Logistics. For services to Transport Logistics.
- Brian Donald Swallow, Vice-President and General Manager, Enterprise Mobility South West and Chair, Business in the Community South West Leadership Board. For services to Community Regeneration.
- Sarah Marina Sweeney. For services to Counselling and Psychotherapy, to Community Education, and to Peace Building through Restorative Dialogue
- Catherine Elizabeth Sykes, Vice-Principal Governance and Compliance, Hull College, East Riding of Yorkshire. For services to Further Education.
- Peter Talbot, Founder, Creator and Company Secretary, The Rude Mechanical Theatre Company. For services to the Arts.
- Angela Tattersall, County President, North Yorkshire and Teesside, St John Ambulance. For voluntary services to St John Ambulance.
- Dr. Jack Lorimer Taylor, Piper and lately President, The Piobairaechd Society. For services to Music.
- Kirsty Helena McKenzie Thatcher (Kirsty Leighton), Chief Executive Officer and Founder, Milk & Honey PR, Hive PR Group. For services to the Public Relations Industry.
- Meurig Thomas, Trade Union Convenor at Hinkley Point C, Unite the Union. For services to the Trade Union Movement.
- Roy Michael Thomas, Chair, Adaptive Riders Collective. For services to Adaptive Cycling in Scotland.
- Brenda Lydia Tighe, Chair, Northern Ireland Counselling Forum. For services to Counselling in Northern Ireland.
- Shirley Ann Tovell. For services to Parliament.
- Maureen Lilian Treadwell, Co-Founder and Treasurer, Birth Trauma Association. For services to Birth Trauma Awareness.
- Paul Stanley Daniel Trevatt, Nursing Leader. For services to Nursing.
- Jennie Louise Truman, Project Co-Ordinator Alternative Provision Specialist Taskforces and Youth Justice Worker, London Borough of Ealing. For services to Vulnerable Young People and to Families.
- Dr. Helen Jean Tucker, lately President, Community Hospitals Association. For services to Community Hospitals.
- Christopher Laurence Turner, Founder, London Bus Theatre Company. For services to Young People in Essex.
- Nichola Twemlow, Group Chair, Made in Stoke. For services to Philanthropy and to the community in Stoke-on-Trent, Staffordshire.
- Adam Twine, Organic Farmer. For services to Community Onshore Wind.
- Iain Henry Varah, Chief Executive, Vision Redbridge Culture and Leisure Ltd. For services to Public Libraries, Culture and Leisure.
- Claire Vincent, Deputy Director Marine and Fisheries Division, Department of Agriculture, Environment and Rural Affairs. For services to Marine Science and to Women in Science.
- Sally Maureen Vincent, Founder, GI Trace. For services to Charity.
- John Alexander Wagner, Comics Writer. For services to British Comic Books and the Comic Book Industry.
- Dr. Carl Samuel Waldmann, lately Director, Intensive Care Unit, Royal Berkshire NHS Foundation Trust. For services to Critically Ill Patients in the NHS.
- Gwynne Walker, Support Manager, Adventurous Training, Soldier Academy. For services to Military Training and to Sport.
- Brian Walsh. For services to Cricket.
- Lucy Jane Warner, Chief Executive, NHS Practitioner Health Service. For services to the NHS.
- Dawn Waterman, Education and Heritage Adviser, Board of Deputies of British Jews. For services to Education.
- Ann Watson, Chief Executive Officer, Enginuity. For services to the Advancement of Skills in the Engineering and Manufacturing Sector.
- Stephen Watson, Broadcaster. For services to Broadcasting and to Kidney Transplant Awareness and to Fundraising in Northern Ireland.
- Keith Chalmers-Watson, Life Member and lately Chair of World Pheasant Association. For services to Wild Bird Research and Conservation.
- Charles Jonathan Watt, lately High Sheriff of Norfolk. For services to Rehabilitation of Offenders and to the community in Norfolk.
- Jill Margaret Webb, Trainer, Girlguiding North East England. For services to Girlguiding.
- Charlotte Amy Serena Webster, Broadcast Journalist, Documentary Maker and Advocate. For services to Broadcasting and to Charity.
- Dr. Karen Jayne Weldon (Karen Juggins), Lead, Keep Stoke Smiling Dental Health Campaign and Consultant Orthodontist, University Hospitals of North Midlands NHS Trust. For services to Dentistry.
- Dr. Anthony Michael Whelan, Youth Football Coach, Manchester United Football Club. For services to Association Football.
- Brian Phillip Whitaker, Police Staff, Metropolitan Police Service. For services to Policing and to National Security.
- Emma Whitfield, Member, National Autistic Society. For services to Special Educational Needs and Disabilities.
- Dr. Karen Ann Whittaker, Senior Education Lead, Institute of Health Visiting. For services to Health Visiting.
- Hollie Whittles, Founder and Director, Purple Frog Systems and Fraggleworks. For services to Women in Business.
- Helen Whyley, Executive Director, Royal College of Nursing Wales. For services to Nursing.
- Alexia Jane Williams, Chartered Engineer, Rolls-Royce. For services to Education and Skills.
- Peter Wilford Williams. For services to Police Education and Training.
- Ruth Williams. For Political and Voluntary Service.
- Jonathan Gordon Berry Williamson, Campaigns Ambassador, Cancer Research UK. For Charitable Service.
- Kevin Wills, Veteran, Portrait Artist and Founder, Fallen of Afghanistan Project. For Charitable Service.
- Mark Keverne Courthope Wills, Deputy Chair of Governors, Royal Star and Garter Charity. For services to Armed Forces Veterans.
- Matthew Dominic Wilson, Chair, Blood Cancer UK. For services to Blood Cancer Awareness and Research.
- Rose Wilson (Rose Neil). For services to Broadcasting and to Charity.
- Lucille Elizabeth Windle, Executive Headteacher, Abbey School, Rotherham, South Yorkshire. For services to Education.
- Colette Marie Wintle, Campaigner. For services to the Haemophilia Community.
- Charles Wood, Lead Peer Mentor, Outcome Home. For services to Tackling Homelessness.
- Roderick George Wood, Volunteer. For services to Youth, to Veterans and to the community in the Highlands.
- Simon Arthur Wood, Executive Headteacher, Sir Martin Frobisher Academy, Clacton-on-Sea. For services to Education.
- Louise Keri Wright, Senior Physiotherapy Technician, Aneurin Bevan University Health Board. For services to Health and Social Care.
- Sarah Jane Wright. For services to Substance Abuse Treatment.
- Professor Simeon John Yates, Professor of Digital Culture, University of Liverpool. For services to Digital Inclusion.
- Professor Jian Jun Zhang, Professor of Computer Animation, National Centre for Computer Animation, Bournemouth University. For services to Computer Animation Research, to Education and to Innovation in STEM.

Overseas and International

- Ifeanyi Anne Agboola, Deputy Head of Mission, British Embassy Tallinn, Estonia. For services to British Foreign Policy.
- Alan Charles Osbourne Bell, Founder, The Vanessa Grant Girls School in Kenya. For services to Girls' Education in Kenya.
- Ryan Chamberlain, lately Technical Services Officer, British Embassy Tehran, Iran. For services to the British Embassy Tehran, Iran.
- Elizabeth Irene Christopher, JP, Lawyer. For services to Law and Justice in Bermuda.
- Rufus John Drabble, H.M. Consul General Miami, Florida, United States of America. For services to British Foreign Policy, to Trade and to British Nationals Overseas.
- Scott Alan Dunning, Team Leader, Foreign, Commonwealth and Development Office. For services to British Foreign Policy.
- Elizabeth Margaret Eaton, Trustee, Kenya Children Centres (UK). For services to Child Welfare and Education in Kenya and to UK/Kenya Relations.
- Dr. Wilfred Christopher Eaton, Chairman of Trustees, Kenya Children Centres (UK). For services to Child Welfare and Education in Kenya and to UK/Kenya Relations.
- Christopher Bower Gaze, Founder and Artistic Director, Bard on the Beach, Vancouver, Canada. For services to British Arts and Culture in Canada.
- Martin Peter Gilbert, lately Director British Council, Austria, Switzerland and Nordics. For services to British Cultural Relations in Europe.
- Steven James Gove, Founder and Director, Prague Fringe Festival, Czech Republic. For services to UK/Czech Republic Cultural Relations.
- Jayne Elizabeth Grimshaw, Founder and Chair, Mango Tree Goa. For services to the Education of Disadvantaged Children in India.
- Jamie Hall, Team Leader, Foreign, Commonwealth and Development Office. For services to National Security.
- Michael Lawrence Hamblin, Director, The Mwezi Foundation. For services to Education in Kenya.
- Alan Hayward, Team Leader, Foreign, Commonwealth and Development Office. For services to National Security.
- Claire Louise Healy, Head, Afghanistan Relocations Islamabad Team, British High Commission Islamabad, Pakistan. For services to British Foreign Policy.
- Martha Holman, Founder, LoveZimbabwe. For services to Community Development in Zimbabwe and to UK/Zimbabwe Relations.
- Paul Felix Hughes, Joint Deputy Head, Gibraltar Negotiations Taskforce, Foreign, Commonwealth and Development Office. For services to British Foreign Policy.
- Fiona Claire Johnston, Volunteer and Charity Worker, Juliet Johnston School, Ghana. For services to Education and Charity in Ghana and to UK/Ghana Relations.
- Nicola Veronica Millington, Team Leader, Foreign, Commonwealth and Development Office. For services to British Foreign Policy.
- Hector Joseph Montado, Chief Technical Officer, Government of Gibraltar. For services to His Majesty’s Government of Gibraltar.
- Tamara Antonia Anson Nielsen, Founder and Director of Acts of Random Kindness (ARK). For services to Charity and Community Development in the Cayman Islands.
- James Adam Normington, Founder, British and Commonwealth Remembrance Project. For services to the Remembrance of British and Commonwealth War Dead in the United States of America.
- Lisa Jayne Samuelson, Director, Eden Myanmar. For services to Victims of Human Trafficking in Southeast Asia.
- Jane Louise Sidebottom, lately Deputy Director, Gibraltar Negotiations Taskforce, Foreign, Commonwealth and Development Office. For service to British Foreign Policy.
- Elizabeth Margaret Mary Slinger, Chair of Trustees, Medical Action Myanmar UK and Volunteer, Medical Action Myanmar. For services to Healthcare in Myanmar.
- Hannah Elizabeth Whittock, lately Joint Deputy Head, Gibraltar Negotiations Taskforce, Foreign, Commonwealth and Development Office. For Services to British Foreign Policy.

===== Crown Dependencies =====
Isle of Man

- Jane Kelly. For services to Emergency Planning and to the Veteran Community on the Isle of Man.
- Claire Louise McCabe. For services to the Royal British Legion and to the Veteran Community on the Isle of Man.

Guernsey

- Ian Michael Brown. For services to Charity and to Cycling in Guernsey.

Jersey

- Michael Patrick Haden, Chairman, Hands Around the World Jersey. For services to the community in Jersey.
- Jason John Wyse, Chief Executive Officer, Silkworth. For services to the community in Jersey.

=== British Empire Medal (BEM) ===
British Empire Medal ribbon

Civil

- Valerie Alexander. For services to Disadvantaged Young People in India.
- Claire Alleguen, Local Engagement Manager and Chair of OUTbound Network, Transport for London. For services to Diversity and Inclusion.
- Dean David Allen, Holiday Activities and Food Programme Partner, Telford and Wrekin Council, Shropshire. For services to the community in Telford, Shropshire.
- Evren Altinok. For services to Young People.
- Richard Anderson, Customs Control Framework Risk and Controls Lead, Borders and Trade, H.M. Revenue and Customs. For services to Charity.
- June Ann Apperley. For services to Scouting and to the community in Gloucester, Gloucestershire.
- Donna Louise Armstrong, Fundraising Volunteer, Homeless Veterans Project and Poppy Scotland. For services to Veterans and to the community in Renfrewshire.
- Neil Barclay, Civilian Librarian, H.M. Prison Thameside, Serco Ltd. For services to Prisoner Rehabilitation.
- Michael John Barnard, President, Mid Staffs Junior Football League. For services to Grassroots Football.
- Wendy Elizabeth Barry Barnes, District Commissioner, Oakley Hunt West Pony Club. For services to Children.
- Patricia Joan Barrett. For services to the Children’s Society and to the community in Old, Northamptonshire.
- Dr. Tina Patricia Barton, Chief Operations Officer, Emerging Markets Quality Trials Ltd. For services to Science and to Trade.
- Janet Beck, Sign Language Interpreter. For services to Interpreting and to the Deaf Community.
- Gary Antony Beckford, President, London Volleyball Association and Founder, All Nations Tournament. For services to the community in East London.
- Carolyn Mary Beeton. For services to the community in Slip End, Luton.
- Sharifa Begum, Employment Adviser, Department for Work and Pensions. For services to Women.
- Raymond Bell, Warrant Officer Class 2 Instructor, Glasgow and Lanarkshire Battalion, Army Cadet Force. For services to Young People.
- Roger Frederick Bell. For services to Local Cricket.
- Lilias Jane Benson, JP DL. For services to the community in Andover, Hampshire.
- Campbell Best. For services to the community in Portadown, County Armagh.
- Sudha Bhatt. For services to Community Cohesion in Wales.
- Maureen Bingham, Supply Chain, Defence Equipment and Support and Menopause Network Chair, Ministry of Defence. For services to Operational Delivery, Logistics and to Diversity and Inclusion.
- Caroline Joanna Bird, lately Diary and Logistics Manager, Cabinet Office. For Public Service.
- Frances Blackburne, North West Regional Manager, Newbloom Healthcare Limited. For services to Nursing and Elderly Care.
- Neil Alexander Blanks. For services to Hospital Radio in Gosport and Portsmouth.
- Marilyn De Blieck, Co-Founder, Ayrshire Voices and Opera West. For services to Music and to the community in Ayrshire.
- Mary Louise Boam, Manager, Hulland Community Pre School, Ashbourne, Derbyshire. For services to Early Years Education.
- Dr. Nichola Booth. For services to the Autistic Community and their Families in Northern Ireland.
- Richard Frank Boswell, Flood Volunteer, Wallington, Hampshire. For services to Flood Defence.
- Dr. Roy Edward Bowden, Governor, Chichester College Group, West Sussex. For services to Further Education.
- Charlotte Elizabeth Bradford, lately Road Safety Policy Advisor, Department for Transport. For services to Road Safety.
- Edwin Herbert Ernest Bridges. For services to Young People and to Sport in Crowborough.
- Alison Mary Brittle, Founder, Director and Chair of Board, Saddleworth Hydro. For services to the community in Saddleworth.
- Matthew Jason Brown, Relationship Manager, Department for Work and Pensions. For services to the community in Cleethorpes.
- Sharon Jane Brown, Chief Executive, DIAL Barnsley. For services to Disabled People.
- Vittoria Bucknall, Consultant Trauma and Orthopaedic Surgeon, Alder Hey Children’s NHS Foundation Trust. For services to Children and Young People.
- Janice Bulfield, Police Staff, Thames Valley Police. For services to Policing.
- Stephen Bunn. For services to Stroke Victims and to the community in Cleveland, North Yorkshire.
- Andrew Burden, Aeronautical and Aerospace Engineer, Defence Equipment and Support. For services to Defence, to Veterans and to the Royal National Lifeboat Institution and Maritime Safety.
- Cefyn Burgess, Weaver and Textile Maker. For services to Arts and Crafts.
- John Burrows. For services to the community in Ballater, Aberdeenshire.
- Jacqueline Burton, Nursery Practitioner and Manager, Children's Learning Centre, Emsworth, Hampshire. For services to Early Years Education.
- Amanda Frances Louise Caldwell, Chair, Rastrick Big Local. For services to the community in Rastrick.
- Isabella Cameron, Head of Kitchen, Grogarry Lodge. For services to Hospitality and to the Rural Economy in South Uist.
- Mabel Cardwell (May Cardwell). For services to Dance and to the community in Corby, Northamptonshire.
- Roger Leslie Cargeeg. For services to the community in Penzance and St Just, Cornwall.
- Gillian Caroe. For services to Refugees and People Seeking Asylum in Eastbourne.
- Scott Caswell, Police Constable, Warwickshire Police. For services to Policing and to Veterans.
- Lynn Cedar, Co-Founder and lately Co-Chief Executive, Roundabout Dramatherapy. For services to Dramatherapy.
- Maxine Chambers, Senior Youth Support Worker, Goal Line Youth Trust and Co-Founder, Bluebell Trust. For services to Young People in Portadown, County Armagh.
- Rebecca Chapman, Founder, Total Ensemble Theatre Company. For services to Inclusive Theatre.
- Fiona Elizabeth Charny, JP DL, Chair, Worcestershire Breast Unit Haven. For services to Patients with Breast Cancer.
- Sally Patricia Chesters. For services to the community in Hythe, Kent.
- Irene Mary Clarke. For services to Charitable Fundraising and to the community in Shipston on Stour, Warwickshire.
- Leslie George Coe, Boathouse Manager, Walmer Lifeboat Station, Royal National Lifeboat Institution. For services to Maritime Safety.
- David Coffey (Desmond Coffey). For Charitable Service.
- Becki Coombe. For services to the community in Coventry and Warwickshire.
- Janet Mary Cooper, lately Clinical Lead, Children's Speech and Language Therapies, Midlands Partnership University NHS Foundation Trust. For services to Speech and Language Development for Children and Young People.
- Lynsey Corbiere, Customer Service Officer, East Midlands Railway. For services to Rail Passengers in Sheffield.
- David Anthony Cottle, Artistic Director, Swansea Jazz Club. For services to Jazz Music.
- John Eric Merchant Cottle. For services to the community in Hayling Island, Hampshire.
- Brenda Couzens, Chair, Penrith Royal National Lifeboat Institution Charity. For voluntary service to the Royal National Lifeboat Institution.
- Phillip Edward Cowell. For services to the community in Shrewsbury, Shropshire.
- Daniel Graeme Crow, Director, 'A Space' Arts. For services to Artists and to Arts and Heritage.
- Robert Edward Cullinan. For services to Community Relations and to Brazilian JuJitsu.
- Elizabeth Culshaw. For services to the community in Ingleton, North Yorkshire.
- Francis Peter Cusack. For services to the Royal Hospital for Sick Children, Edinburgh.
- Martin Cuthbert. For services to the community in the London Borough of Bexley.
- Cynthia Davis, lately Councillor, Swale Borough Council and Faversham Town Council. For Political Service.
- Stephen John Davis, lately Custodian, Prime Minister’s Office. For Public Service.
- John Clint Day, lately Police Constable, Humberside Police. For services to the community in the East Riding of Yorkshire.
- Caroline Anne Dickinson, Playgroup Leader, St Leonards Pre-School, Exeter. For services to Early Years Education.
- George Michael Dodd. For services to Rowing.
- Jennifer Jane Dudley, County Commissioner and Lead Volunteer for Safeguarding, Girlguiding. For services to Young People in London and the South East.
- Mary Donald Dumigan, Volunteer. For voluntary services to the community in Kilmarnock, East Ayrshire.
- Warren John Dunkley, Founder, Off the Ropes and Occupational Therapist, Oxleas NHS Foundation Trust. For services to Mental Health Support.
- Sarah Jane Edwards, Implementation Team Leader, Delivery Strand Workplace Transformation Programme, Department for Work and Pensions. For services to Grassroots Sports.
- Jack Joseph Emsley, Councillor, London Borough of Hounslow. For Public Service.
- Laszlo Robert Fossett Endresz (Mooky the Clown), Circus Performer and Producer, Blackpool Tower Circus. For services to Circus Entertainment in the North West.
- Dr. Tyrrell George John Robert Evans, Vice-President, St Christopher's Hospice. For services to Palliative Care.
- Susan Falconer, Police Community Support Officer. For services to the community in Blackwood, Caerphilly.
- Ernest George Fallowfield, Director, Windermere Lake Cruises. For services to Tourism.
- Helen Joyce Fannon, Co-Founder, Thomas Fowell Buxton Society. For services to Heritage.
- Dr. John Alexander Fannon, Co-Founder, Thomas Fowell Buxton Society. For services to Heritage.
- Patricia Feeney, Leader, Caledon Playgroup. For services to Young Children in Northern Ireland.
- Lorraine Fergus, People and Culture Team, Department for Work and Pensions. For Public and Community Service.
- Morna Elizabeth Ferguson. For services to Girlguiding and to Charity.
- Lilian Jane Field, Headteacher, Strathdon School and Crathie School, Aberdeenshire. For services to Rural Education.
- Audrey Flannagan, Manager, Glasgow South East Food Bank. For services to the community in Glasgow.
- Claire Margaret Anne Flowers, Chief Executive Officer, Girlguiding Ulster. For services to Girls and Young Women.
- Wendy Ann Ford, Volunteer, The Children’s Society. For services to Charity and to Young People.
- Leslie Alan France, Swimming Coach. For services to Swimming and to the community in Wigan.
- James Breingan Fraser, Chief Executive Officer, The Steamship Sir Walter Scott Trust. For services to Tourism and Heritage in the Loch Lomond and the Trossachs National Park.
- Rex Ormonde Freeman. For services to the Arts and to the community in Cambridge, Cambridgeshire.
- John Fulton, Community Leader and Volunteer. For services to the community in Houston and Crosslee, Renfrewshire.
- Linda Annette Gaine. For services to Grassroots Netball in East Anglia.
- Julie Gard, Tutor, Bracknell Forest Borough Council, Berkshire. For services to Further Education.
- David Gerald Gardiner, Policy and Honours Team Support, Welsh Government. For Public and Charitable Service.
- Susan Jane Garner, Volunteer Facilitator, Carers in Mind, Richmond Borough Mind. For services to Mental Health Carers in South West London.
- Paul John Gates, Vice-Chair, British Association for Immediate Care. For services to Pre-Hospital Critical Care.
- Jamie Paul Goddard, lately Deputy Headteacher. For services to Education, to Charity and to Young People.
- David Mark Green, Duty Manager, Transport for Greater Manchester. For services to Diversity and Inclusion in Manchester.
- Joanne Green. For Parliamentary and Political Service.
- Elizabeth Mary Greig, Volunteer, Royal Voluntary Service Hanley Centre. For services to the community in Stoke-on-Trent, Staffordshire.
- Claire Elizabeth Griffiths. For services to Cancer Charities.
- Alan Eric Grigg, Area President, St John Ambulance. For voluntary services to the community in Solihull.
- Christopher John Groombridge, Chair, Teeth Team. For services to Child Dental Health Improvement.
- Eleanor Sarah Guedalla. For services to Football for Women and Marginalised Communities.
- Christopher John Hailey (Christopher Hailey-Norris), Chief Executive Officer, Up For Yorkshire. For services to Charity and to the community in Yorkshire.
- Alan Thomas Halcrow, Chair, Clear Drains Ltd. For services to the Drainage Industry.
- Alice Mary Hamilton, lately District Commissioner Central Division Girls' Brigade Scotland and lately Officer, 1st Grangemouth Girls' Brigade. For services to the community in Grangemouth, Stirling and Falkirk.
- Paul Hammerton, Special Wreath Maker, The Poppy Factory. For services to Remembrance.
- David James Harrop. For services to Road Safety and to Charitable Fundraising.
- Lynn Diane Hay, Administrator, Old Streetonians Rugby Football Club. For services to Amateur Sport in London.
- Deborah Haythorne, Co-Founder and Co-Chief Executive, Roundabout Dramatherapy. For services to Dramatherapy.
- Brian Charlton Heald. For services to Music and to the community in Chester, Cheshire.
- Trevor Payne Heeks, Town Crier, Trowbridge. For services to the community of Trowbridge and to Twinning.
- Shirley Ann Henderson (Shirley McGill), Founder, McGill School of Speech and Drama, and Director, Aberdeen Youth Music Theatre. For services to Drama.
- The Reverend Christopher Charles Henley, Voluntary Railway Chaplain. For services to the South Western Railway Network.
- Alan John Hiatt, Mental Health and Learning Difficulties Volunteer. For services to Ty Siriol and Hafan Deg Wards, Aneurin Bevan University Health Board.
- William Peter Higgins, Instructor, Seidokan Karate Club. For services to Karate and to the community in Wigan.
- Geoffrey Hill, Chair, RAF Middleton St George Memorial Association. For voluntary services to Aviation History.
- Donna Rebecca Hilton, Youth Services Manager, Nottingham University Hospitals NHS Trust. For services to Children and Young People.
- Judith Mary Holling. For services to the community in Barnsley, South Yorkshire.
- Dr. Neville Hollingworth. For services to Public Engagement and Accessibility in Geology and Palaeontology.
- Sally Hollingworth. For services to Public Engagement and Accessibility in Geology and Palaeontology.
- Anne Elizabeth Hook, lately Police Constable and Founder, BLAST – Blue Light Alcohol Support Team, Metropolitan Police Service. For services to Alcohol Addiction Support.
- Lynn Hope, lately Head Coach and Manager, Northern Hope Gymnastics Club. For services to Inclusive Gymnastics.
- Paul Horton, Trustee and Volunteer, Mansfield Fire Station and Museum. For services to the community in Mansfield and Nottinghamshire.
- Pauline Patricia Knifton Hough. For services to Theatre and to the community in Nantwich.
- Melanie Jane Houldershaw. For services to Local Theatre and Choir.
- Lyndsay Howden, Emergency Response Volunteer, British Red Cross. For services to the British Red Cross and to the community in Humberside.
- The Reverend Sandra Howes (Cassandra Howes). For services to Education and to Inter-Faith Relations in Bedfordshire.
- Leanne Johanna Howlett, Expert by Experience and Specialist Perinatal Psychiatric Nurse, Institute of Health Visiting. For services to Health Visiting.
- Tanya Evelyn Mary Hughes. For services to the community of Ballybeen, Belfast.
- Margaret Anne Irvine, Founder, Birsay Drama Group. For services to Drama and to the community in Orkney.
- Adrian Bennett Isaac, Founder and Chair, Boston Woods Trust. For services to the Environment.
- Emily Alice Jarvis, Head of Corporate Operations, Home Office. For Public Service.
- Isabella Barbara Jenney, Councillor, North Northamptonshire Council and Rushden Town Council. For services to the community in East Northamptonshire.
- Dr. Stephen Jess, lately Senior Scientific Officer, Agri-Food and Biosciences Institute. For services to Agriculture in Northern Ireland.
- Georgina Johnstone, Engagement and Consultation Officer, West Midlands Police. For services to the community in the West Midlands.
- Julia Jones, Founder and Director, Llandeilo Fawr Festival of Music. For services to Music.
- Adam Joolia, Chief Executive Officer, AudioActive. For services to Young People and to Music.
- Jeanette Winifred Judge. For services to the community in Sidcup.
- Kabir Kaul, Conservationist, Urban Nature Campaigner and Writer and lately Youth Council Member, RSPB. For services to Nature.
- Eleanor Keeley, School Cook and Catering Manager, Linden Lodge School, London Borough of Wandsworth. For services to Education.
- Alexander Joseph Kelly. For services to the Voluntary Sector in South Ayrshire and Scotland.
- Carmen Soraya Kelly. For services to Young People, to Cancer and Health Awareness and to Social Cohesion.
- Richard Geoffrey Horsford Kemp. For services to the community in Langford, Oxfordshire.
- Jason John Kinghorn, Staff Officer, Royal Air Force Career Fields. For services to Royal Air Force Career Management.
- Martin John Kinsey, Station Staff Officer, Wattisham Flying Station. For services to Military Personnel and their Families.
- Henrietta June Kirk. For services to the community in Groomsport, County Down.
- Paul Kitching, Head of the Natural History Museum, Tring. For services to Museums and to the community in Tring, Hertfordshire.
- Fiona Jayne Knight. For services to People with Learning Disabilities and to Autistic People.
- Iraklis Kolokotronis, Head of Early Years, Childcare and Asset Strategy, Early Education and Childcare Service, Westminster City Council and the Royal Borough of Kensington and Chelsea. For services to the Early Years.
- Farida Laeeq, Care Coordinator, Brownlow Health. For services to Supporting Refugees and Asylum Seekers.
- Esther Louise Lagden, Programme Manager, Network Rail. For services to Rail Safety.
- Jason Land, Disability and Inclusion Lead, Grimsby Town Foundation. For services to Association Football.
- Jane Anne Larkham. For services to the community in Wendover, Buckinghamshire.
- Regina Parveen Oliver-Lawlor (Rosina Oliver-Lawlor). For Parliamentary and Political Service.
- Margaret Lawson, Community Safety Manager, South Yorkshire Police. For services to Young People in South Yorkshire.
- Edith Joyce Leask. For services to Mental Health and Wellbeing.
- Michael John William Leonard, Special Sergeant, West Midlands Police. For services to Policing.
- Georgina Annabel Wynne Lewers. For services to Charitable Causes and Fundraising.
- Frederick George Lewis, Volunteer Appropriate Adult, South Yorkshire Police. For services to Vulnerable People in Custody.
- Rita Helen Lewis (Helen Hopkins). For services to Music and Music Education.
- Robin Lockhart, Director and Co-Founder, Catalyst in Communities. For services to Youth Work and Young People.
- Steven Lowe, Foster Carer, Wigan Council. For services to Foster Care in Wigan, Greater Manchester.
- Wendy Jayne Lowe, Foster Carer, Wigan Council. For services to Foster Care in Wigan, Greater Manchester.
- William Luckhurst, Senior Technical Manager (Projects), Faculty of Natural, Mathematical and Engineering Sciences, King's College London. For services to Scanning Electron Microscopy.
- Helen Mary Mack, DL, lately Director of Income Generation, Wakefield Hospice. For services to Hospice Care.
- Lloyd Wallace Magee. For services to the community in County Londonderry.
- Peter Mambara, Head of Technical and Training for First Bus. For services to Public Transport and Transport Engineering.
- David Jonathan Manns, Volunteer Snowsport Official. For services to Snowsport.
- Angela Jane Manson. For services to Youth Musical Theatre.
- Faye Marsh, Peer Mentor Manager, Darlington Borough Council. For services to Children and Young People in County Durham.
- Janet Louise Mather, Chair, Behçet's Patients Centres. For services to People Living with Behçet's.
- Erica Sarah Maxwell. For services to the Economy and to the community in Northern Ireland.
- Jenny Ann McBrien, Patient Advocate. For services to Women Living with Breast Cancer.
- Clare McCawley, Victorian Garden Manager, South Eastern Health and Social Care Trust. For services to Health and Social Care and to the Community and Voluntary Sector.
- Professor Fiona Sarah Winifred McCullough. For services to Education and Outreach.
- James Isaac McDonald, Volunteer Athletics Coach. For services to Junior Athletics.
- Mary Lawrence McGregor, District and Divisional Commissioner, Girl Guides and Member, Church of Scotland Guild. For services to Girlguiding and to the Church of Scotland Guild in Banffshire and Moray.
- Gregory Walter Thompson McKinley, Operations Director, The Gallaher Trust. For services to the Economy in Northern Ireland.
- Lawrence John McVeigh. For services to the community in Medway, Kent.
- John Cyril Meek, Rural and Business Crime Officer, West Mercia Police. For services to the Rural Community.
- Hitesh Mehta, Special Constable, West Midlands Police and Charity Trustee, Shree Krishna Temple. For services to Policing, to Charity and to Volunteering in Coventry, West Midlands.
- Jennifer Rosemary Rose-Miller. For services to Local Heritage and to the community in Nairnshire.
- Dr. Katie Louise Misselbrook, Consultant Anaesthetist, Alder Hey Children's NHS Foundation Trust. For services to Children and Young People.
- Dharmesh Mistry, Police Constable, West Yorkshire Police. For services to Policing and to the community in Bradford and Leeds.
- Keith Mitchell, Housing Enabling Officer, South Norfolk Council. For services to Affordable Housing.
- Mary Mitchell, National Returns Progression Officer, Home Office. For services to Diversity and Inclusion.
- Michael James Mitchell, Custodian, Prime Minister's Office. For Public Service.
- Kathleen Elizabeth Moir, Voluntary Collector, PoppyScotland. For Charitable Service.
- Joyce Montgomery. For services to the community in County Tyrone.
- Audrey Moore, Chair, Friends of Rossmar School. For voluntary services to Special Education.
- Juliet Ruth Mosney, NHS and Care Volunteer Responder, Royal Voluntary Service. For Voluntary Service.
- John Edward Mount, Witness Service Volunteer, Crown Court at Chester. For Voluntary Service.
- Janine Constance Musson, Gymnastics Coach, Judge and lately Chair, Bedfordshire Gymnastics Association. For services to Gymnastics.
- Maurice Neely. For services to Health and Social Care in Northern Ireland.
- Eric Norman. For services to the community in Wheddon Cross and Minehead, Somerset.
- Charles Marlow Obazuaye, Director of Human Resources, Customer Services and Public Affairs, London Borough of Bromley. For Public Service.
- Stephen James O'Callaghan, Safeguarding and Crime Prevention Lead, TransPennine Express. For services to Rail Safety.
- Pauline Jennifer Odbert, Volunteer Store Manager, New Hope. For services to Homeless People in Watford.
- Clare Elizabeth Olver, Programmes Manager, Community Forest Trust. For services to Community Forestry.
- Douglas Derek Ormston, Youth Work Manager. For services to Youth Work in Scotland.
- Alice Elouise Outten, Chief Executive Officer, Prom Ally. For services to Young People.
- Debra Jayne Padgett, Pathology Network Operational Lead and Clinical Pathology Lead, Northumbria Healthcare NHS Foundation Trust. For services to Biomedical Science in the NHS.
- Alan Thomas Parker. For voluntary services to Rugby League Football and to the community in Hull, East Riding of Yorkshire.
- Martyn Pattie. For services to the community in Ongar, Essex.
- John Alfred Douglas Peel, Chair, North Devon Branch, Royal Marines Association. For voluntary service to the Royal Marines, the Royal Marines Charity and the Veteran Community.
- James Richard Perrin. For services to the community in Bewdley and Kidderminster, Worcestershire.
- Sheila Pheely, Volunteer, Royal Voluntary Service Cafe, Stirling Community Hospital. For Voluntary Service.
- Jeffrey Sean Picton, District Commissioner. For services to Scouting and to the community in Wigan, Greater Manchester.
- Bernard William Thomas Pinner. For services to the Air Cadets and to International Missionary Work.
- Nicolas Edwin Powell, JP, lately Magistrate Montgomeryshire Bench. For services to the Administration of Justice.
- Susan Jennifer Mary Price, Chair, Friends of Hyde Park and Kensington Gardens. For Charitable Service.
- Keith Prince, On-call Firefighter, Dorset and Wiltshire Fire and Rescue Service. For services to the community in Cranborne, Dorset.
- Anita Angela Pugh. For services to Armed Forces Veterans and to the community in St Thomas, Swansea.
- Kimberley Purkis, Founder, Face Everything and Rise. For services to Individuals Living with Intestinal Failure.
- Max Raffe, Group Scout Leader, 13th Ipswich Sea Scouts. For services to Scouting.
- Alpa Raja, Member, Veterans Advisory and Pensions Committee. For services to Veterans' Welfare.
- Lee Allen Ralph, Firefighter, Avon Fire and Rescue Service. For services to Mental Health, Wellbeing, and Resilience in the Fire and Rescue Sector.
- Derek Reid, Volunteer. For services to Suicide Awareness and to the community in Castlemilk, Glasgow.
- Catherine Mary Repton, Founder and Trustee, The Friends of the Baby Unit, University Hospitals of Derby and Burton NHS Foundation Trust. For services to Premature Babies and their Families.
- Verity Rhodes. For services to the community in Merseyside.
- Adrian Richards, Police Community Support Officer, Durham Constabulary. For services to the community in Chester-le-Street, County Durham.
- Lisette Van Riel, Co-Founder and Director, DoggyLottery and DoggyWarriors. For services to Animal Welfare Charities.
- Alexander Rigby, Fundraising Officer for Centre 56, MerseyRail. For services to Charity.
- Richard Michael Roberts. For services to Charitable Causes.
- Valerie Jane Roberts, Brownie Leader, 2nd Tilehurst Brownies. For services to Girlguiding and to the community in Tilehurst, Reading.
- Brian Robertson, Town Clerk, Goole Town Council. For services to Local Government.
- Eric Graeme Robertson. For services to the community in York.
- Claire Marie Robinson, Foster Carer, Birmingham Children's Trust. For services to Foster Care in Birmingham.
- Donald James Robinson. For services to the Merseyside Swimming Community.
- Scott Steven Rogers, lately Head Coach, England National Amputee Football Team. For services to Disability Sport.
- Jean Irene Routley. For services to Church Music and to the community in Backwell, North Somerset.
- David John Rowlands, Military Artist. For services to Art, to British Military History and to Charity.
- Christina Roy. For services to the community in Cardiff, South Glamorgan.
- Valerie Faith Royle. For services to the community in Honiton, Devon.
- Peter Scobie, Head Chef, Queen’s University Belfast. For services to Higher Education.
- Ian William Ligertwood Scott, Volunteer. For services to Art and to the community in North Ronaldsay, Orkney.
- John Gordon Scott, Serious Crime Exhibits and Property Manager, Police Service of Northern Ireland. For services to Policing.
- Margaret Woods Scott, Chair, T21 Charity. For services to Down Syndrome Children, Adults and their Families.
- Barbara Scrimshaw, Fundraising Organiser, The People’s Dispensary for Sick Animals. For Charitable Service.
- Pundrique Radheyshyam Sharma, Consultant Plastic Surgeon, Alder Hey Children's NHS Foundation Trust. For services to Children and Young People.
- Andrew Graham Sheldon, Councillor, Essex County Council. For Political and Public Service.
- Dr. Edmund Harold Shillabeer. For services to Charitable Fundraising, to Athletics and to the community in Plymouth, Devon.
- Sally Margaret Simpson. For services to the community in Bowthorpe, Norfolk.
- Nirmal Singh, Community Cook, Eastside Community Trust, Bristol. For services to the community in Bristol.
- Hannah May Sloggett, Co-Founder and Co-Director, Nudge Community Builders. For Charitable Service.
- David Stewart Smallwoods. For services to Local Football.
- Lena Smith, Library Programme Manager, Pen to Print. For services to Public Libraries in Barking and Dagenham.
- Mary Smith. For Charitable Service.
- Judy Senta Tayler-Smith. For services to the Civic City of London and to Charity.
- Jennifer Elizabeth Smyth. For services to Disability Sport.
- Richard Anthony Soan. For services to Youth Cancer Treatment through Charitable Fundraising.
- Michael John Springett. For services to Young People in the East of England.
- Martin Brotherton Spurrier. For services to Charitable Causes and to the community in Oxfordshire.
- Richard Starrs, Project Manager, Stockton and Darlington Railway Bicentenary. For services to Heritage.
- Martyn Clive Steers, Volunteer, St John Ambulance Kent. For voluntary services to Community First Aid.
- Neville Percy Stephens. For services to the community in Craven Arms, Shropshire.
- Carole Stevens, Team Leader, RSPCA Llys Nini. For services to Animal Welfare and to the community in Swansea, West Glamorgan.
- Ian Stroud, Chair, Porthcawl Lifeboat Management Group, Royal National Lifeboat Institution. For services to Porthcawl Lifeboat Station.
- Beryl Shirley Stubbins. For services to the community in Norfolk.
- Alice Sutherland, Pupil Support Assistant, Alness Academy, Ross and Cromarty. For services to Vulnerable Young People in Alness, Ross and Cromarty.
- Louise Sutherland, Manager, Peter Pan Playschool, Bookham, Surrey. For services to Early Years.
- Barbara Celia Sved. For services to Disabled and Learning Disabled Adults in Harrow and Northwood, Greater London.
- Irfan Aslam Syed, Councillor and Chair, Salford Forum for Refugees. For services to Refugee Resettlement.
- Christopher Norman Symes, Trustee and lately Chair, The Lyneal Trust. For services to Disabled People.
- Graham Syrett. For services to the community in Cotham and Kingsdown, Bristol.
- Eric Charles Taylor, Chair, Fundraising Branch, Penlee Lifeboat Station, Royal National Lifeboat Institution. For services to Penlee Lifeboat Station.
- Josef Matthew Taylor, Consultant Surgeon, Alder Hey Children's NHS Foundation Trust. For services to Children and Young People.
- Steven Thake, Train Manager Mentor, East Midlands Railway. For services to Rail Passengers.
- Jennifer Jaculin Thomas. For Charitable Service.
- Caron Elaine Thompson, Founder and Director, Common Unity. For services to Health and Wellbeing.
- Steven Thompson, Volunteer, Waterloo Rugby Football Club. For services to Rugby Union Football and to the community in Crosby, Merseyside.
- Alan Christopher Thurlow. For services to Swimming.
- Donald Richard Todd. For services to the community in Windsor, Berkshire.
- Jean Mary Todd. For services to the community in Windsor, Berkshire.
- Samuel Todd, Service Delivery Manager, Bus Service Operations, Translink. For services to Public Transport.
- Hazel Jane Tomkins, Volunteer, The Prince & Princess of Wales Hospice, Glasgow. For Charitable Service.
- Craig Thomas Trail, Chairman of Sandhaven and Pitullie Harbour Trust. For services to the community in Fraserburgh, Aberdeenshire.
- Alison Jane Turner, Chair, Phelan-McDermid Syndrome Foundation UK. For services to the Learning Disabled and Neurodiverse Community.
- John Stuart Turner, Adult Instructor, Greater Manchester Army Cadet Force. For voluntary services to Young People and to Charitable Fundraising.
- Caroline Tyerman, lately Lead Practitioner, SEND and Inclusion, Brougham Primary School Hartlepool. For services to Education.
- Ruth Verner. For services to the community in County Antrim.
- Roger David Mingins Walton, Consultant Trauma and Orthopaedic Surgeon, Alder Hey Children's NHS Foundation Trust. For services to Children and Young People.
- Darren James Ward, lately Railwayman, West Midlands Trains and Freightliner Group. For Charitable Service, particularly to Birmingham Children's Hospital.
- Nicholas Kevin Davis Ward. For services to the community in Over Kellet, Lancashire.
- Kim Watson. For services to Grassroots Netball in East Anglia.
- Patricia Marie Wells, Early Years Expert, Tower Hamlets Council. For services to Early Years in the London Borough of Tower Hamlets.
- Michael Evan West. For services to the community in Leighton Buzzard, Bedfordshire.
- Christine Joy Wheatley. For services to the community in Horsted Keynes, West Sussex.
- Allison White, Founder, Great Aycliffe Cancer Support Group. For services to Supporting People with Cancer.
- Terence Francis Whitty, Royal Navy Association Lead Mentor, HMS Raleigh. For voluntary services to Royal Navy Recruits.
- Lorna Bridget Williams, Chief Executive Officer, British Adhesives and Sealants Association. For services to the Chemicals Industry.
- Peter Wills, Special Wreath Maker, The Poppy Factory. For services to Remembrance.
- Diane Kathleen Willson. For services to the Education Community in Bognor Regis, West Sussex.
- Alice Louise Wintergold, Consultant Clinical Scientist, Sussex Community NHS Foundation Trust. For services to People with Disabilities.
- Tyron Marcus Woodford, Access Planning Assistant for Network Rail. For services to Diversity and Inclusion in the Rail Sector.
- Simon Ernest Wootton. For services to the community in South Essex.
- David Thomas Crowe Workman. For services to Rugby and to Community Relations in Ballynahinch.
- Dr. David Martin Wright, Consultant Trauma and Orthopaedic Surgeon, Alder Hey Children’s NHS Foundation Trust. For services to Children and Young People.
- Enola Wright, Founder, Insulinoma Charity UK. For services to the Insulinoma Community.
- John David Wright. For services to Cricket in Warwickshire and the West Midlands.

Overseas and International

- Daniel Anthony Calvert, lately Executive Chef, Four Seasons Hotel Tokyo at Marunouchi. For services to the Culinary Arts in Japan and to UK/Japan Culinary Relations.
- Lionel Eugene Cann, former Director, Salvation Army Emergency Disaster Services Team and Manager of the Emergency Housing Shelter, Bermuda. For services to Emergency Disaster Relief and Homelessness in Bermuda.
- Ralph Cantrell, Eastern Cyprus Sub Aqua Club BSAC Special Branch 0120 Diving Officer. For services to the British Forces Cyprus Community and to Diving Safety in Cyprus.
- Barbara Helen Connell, Founder and Chair, Kotu Trust. For services to Education and Young People in The Gambia.
- Sapphire Joy Francesca Dalton, Desk Officer, Foreign, Commonwealth and Development Office. For services to British Foreign Policy.
- Julia Clare Downey, Founder, the Flying Pig Project, Willink School, Berkshire. For services to Children and Education in Moldova.
- Matthew Peter Ellis, Desk Officer, Foreign, Commonwealth and Development Office. For services to British Foreign Policy.
- Charles Peter Nicholas Entwistle, President, Yachting Gives Back. For services to Charity and to Vulnerable People in Mallorca.
- Catherine Marjorie Grove, Kotu Trust. For services to Education and Young People in The Gambia.
- Alison Jo-Ann Hickman, Founder and Trustee, Transform Salone. For services to the community in Sierra Leone.
- James William Hill, Founder and Coordinator, Katangi Orphans Project. For services to Disadvantaged Children in Katangi, Kenya.
- Mark Jewiss, Desk Officer, Foreign, Commonwealth and Development Office. For services to British Foreign Policy.
- Fiona Maxton, Consular Regional Operations Manager, British Embassy Moscow, Russia. For services to British Foreign Policy and to British Nationals Overseas.
- Glenda Lynne McTaggart, Senior Manager, Education Programmes, Cayman Islands. For services to Education in the Cayman Islands.
- Raymond Glyn Pritchard, Owner, Alpine Lifestyle Partners and former Welsh Masters Ski Champion. For services to Sport, to Tourism and to UK/Switzerland Relations.
- Gayl Elizabeth Russell, Founder and Director, Community Kitchen, Brussels, Belgium. For services to Refugees and Vulnerable People in Brussels.
- Keri Scott, Director of Education, Government of Gibraltar. For services to Education in Gibraltar.
- Zoë Clarissa Townsley, Assistant Administrator, the British Indian Ocean Territory. For services to British Foreign Policy.

==== Crown Dependencies ====
Isle of Man

- Moira Patricia Chrystal. For services to Local Government and to the community in Ramsey, Isle of Man.

Guernsey

- Ben Edward Gregg. For services to St Martin Parish Guernsey.
- Johanna Norman. For services to Swimming in Guernsey.

Jersey

- Dawn Moir Tinley. For services to People with Learning Disabilities in Jersey.

=== Royal Red Cross ===
Royal Red Cross ribbon

==== Member of the Royal Red Cross (RRC) ====
- Chief Petty Officer Laura Jane Fallon, ARRC, Queen Alexandra’s Royal Naval Nursing Service, Y004160V.
- Lieutenant Colonel David John Jenkins, Royal Army Medial Service, 553879.

==== Associate of the Royal Red Cross (ARRC) ====
- Lieutenant Megan Joyce Muirhead, Queen Alexandra’s Royal Naval Nursing Service, 30285173.
- Staff Sergeant Natasha Sinclair, Royal Army Medial Service, 30126171.
- Flight Lieutenant Neill Louis Cordingley, Royal Air Force, 543402.
- Warrant Officer Kay Rebecca Ward, Royal Air Force, Q8505593.

=== King's Police Medal (KPM) ===
King's Police Medal ribbon

England and Wales

- Nicholas James Blackburn, Detective Chief Superintendent, Metropolitan Police Service.
- Hayley Laura Crawford, lately Inspector, Nottinghamshire Police.
- Heidi Patricia Goldsack, Constable, North Wales Police.
- Yasmin Lalani, Detective Chief Inspector, Metropolitan Police Service.
- Kim Madill, Chief Superintendent, West Midlands Police.
- Russell Massie, Sergeant, Thames Valley Police.
- Richard Jon Padwell, Chief Superintendent, West Yorkshire Police.
- Amanda Pearson, Chief Constable, Dorset Police.
- Jason Pye, Detective Chief Inspector, Merseyside Police.
- Emma Rickard, Detective Sergeant, Metropolitan Police Service.
- Michelle Shooter, Deputy Chief Constable, Derbyshire Constabulary.
- Paul James Shutler, Constable, Hampshire & Isle of Wight Constabulary.
- Timothy Robert Smith, Chief Constable, Kent Police.
- John Christopher Sykes, Assistant Chief Constable, Greater Manchester Police.
- Laurence James Taylor, Assistant Commissioner, Metropolitan Police Service.
- Mohammed Munim Uddin, Sergeant, Metropolitan Police Service.

Scotland

- Rhona Meikle, Police Sergeant, Police Scotland.
- Sarah Taylor, Detective Chief Superintendent, Police Scotland.
- Michelle Webster, Management Support Sergeant, Police Scotland.

Northern Ireland

- Elaine McCabe, Sergeant, Police Service of Northern Island.
- Jonathan Anthony McToal, Inspector, Police Service of Northern Island.
- Ronald Dwayne Stewart, Sergeant, Police Service of Northern Island.

Overseas

- Peter Alan Lansdown, Detective Superintendent, Royal Cayman Islands Police Service.

Isle of Man

- Kate Crompton, Detective Constable, Isle of Man Constabulary.

=== King's Fire Service Medal (KFSM) ===
King's Fire Service Medal ribbon

England and Wales

- Amanda Jane Dixon, Temporary Group Manager, County Durham and Darlington Fire and Rescue Service.
- Stewart James Nicholson, Chief Fire Officer, Tyne and Wear Fire and Rescue.
- Jonathan Francis Smith, London Fire Commissioner, London Fire Brigade.

Scotland

- Chris Getty, Area Commander, Scottish Fire and Rescue Service.
- Ian Malcolm Nicolson, On Call Support Watch Commander, Scottish Fire and Rescue Service.

Northern Ireland

- Patrick Bernard Quinn, Station Commander, Northern Ireland Fire and Rescue Service.

=== King's Ambulance Service Medal (KAM) ===
King's Ambulance Service Medal ribbon

England and Wales

- Paula Marie Jeffrey, Consultant Paramedic, Welsh Ambulance Services University NHS Trust.
- Dr. Maxine Lilian Power, lately Director of Quality, Innovation and Improvement, North West Ambulance Service NHS Trust.
- Liam Anthony Sagi, National Strategic Lead for Out-of-Hospital Cardiac Arrest, Association of Ambulance Chief Executives and Advanced Paramedic in Critical Care, East of England Ambulance Service NHS Trust and East Anglian Air Ambulance.

Scotland

- Colin Brown, Paramedic, Scottish Ambulance Service.

Northern Ireland

- William Mark Cochrane, Assistant Director of Operations, Northern Ireland Ambulance Service.

=== King's Volunteer Reserves Medal (KVRM) ===
King's Volunteer Reserves Medal ribbon

- Colonel Lex Aagathangelou, VR, Army Reserve
- Major Richard Patrick Aallman, VR, General List, Army Reserve
- Lieutenant Colonel Eric Mark Bellew, VR, Royal Army Medical Service, Army Reserve
- Major Ian Macdonald Bunce, VR, The Royal Regiment of Scotland, Army Reserve
- Wing Commander Brian Mark Colligan
- Air Specialist (Class 1) David John Goodwin

=== King's Gallantry Medal (KGM) ===
King's Gallantry Medal ribbon

- Sapper Alex Appleby-Mason, The Royal Engineers, Army Reserve

=== King's Commendation for Valuable Service ===
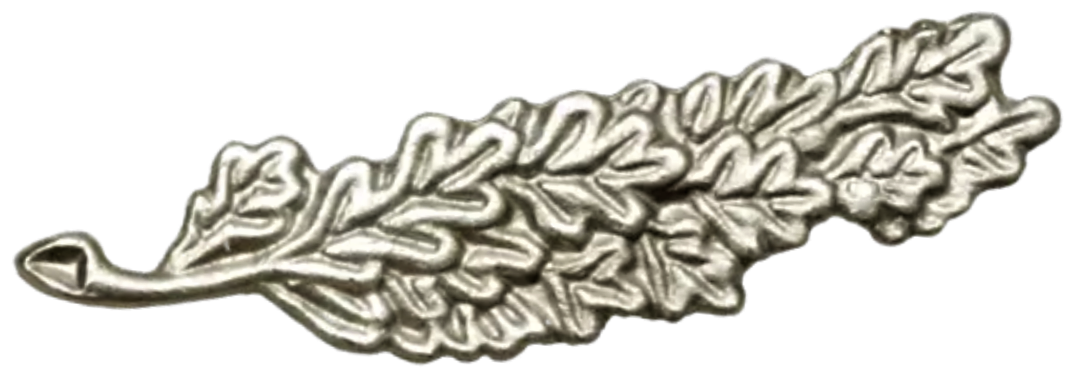
King's Commendation for Valuable Service device

- Lieutenant Commander Glyn Terence Duffell
- Commander Mathew Gee
- Lieutenant Jake Alexander Robertson
- Lieutenant Commander Anya C Shepherd
- Warrant Officer Class 2 Darren James Fowler, The Royal Signals
- Major Christopher James Meyrick Lloyd, The Mercian Regiment
- Captain David Matthew Rechner, The Royal Army Medical Service
- Major Oliver Graham Rostron, Irish Guards
- Squadron Leader Michael James William Browne
- Group Captain Kevin Jeffrey Terrett, OBE
- Squadron Leader Lewis James Travers
- Mr Jonathan Walsh, Civil Servant

=== King's Commendation for Bravery ===
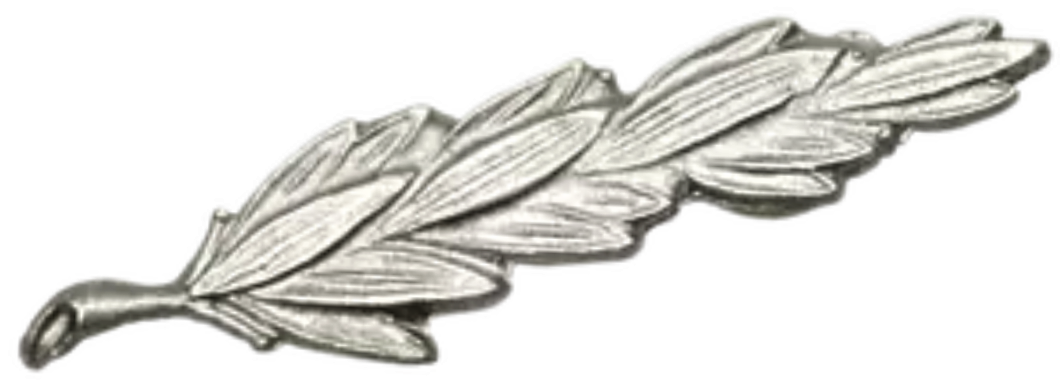
King's Commendation for Bravery device

- Corporal James Kirkby Bark, Adjutant General's Corps (Royal Military Police)
- Lance Corporal Kieron Edward Buchan, The Corps of Royal Electrical and Mechanical Engineers
- Air Specialist (Class 1) George Karnovski

== Australia ==
The 2026 King's Birthday Honours for Australia were announced on 8 June 2026 by the Governor-General, Sam Mostyn.

== New Zealand ==
The 2026 Birthday Honours for New Zealand were announced on 1 June 2026.

== The Bahamas ==
Appointments made by The King on the advice of his ministers in The Bahamas.

=== Most Excellent Order of the British Empire ===
Civil division ribbon

==== Member of the Order of the British Empire (MBE) ====
Civil

- Eulease Cynthia Beneby. For services to Education.

=== British Empire Medal (BEM) ===
Civil division ribbon

Civil

- The Reverend Benjamin Edward Pratt. For services to Religion.

== Solomon Islands ==
Appointments made by The King on the advice of his ministers in the Solomon Islands.

=== Most Excellent Order of the British Empire ===
Civil division ribbon

==== Officer of the Order of the British Empire (OBE) ====
Civil

- Belshazzar Gina Tekulu. For services to Education and Administration, to Public Service and to Community Development.

==== Member of the Order of the British Empire (MBE) ====
Civil

- Tom Ma'alo. For services to Education in the Transport Sector, to Student Welfare, to School Infrastructure and to Community

Development.

- Donald Papaku Malasa. For services to Education, to Public Service and to Community Development.
- Alan McNeil. For services to the field of Land Administration, Reform and Management.
- Bin Wang Billy Warren. For services to Commerce and Business, to Social and Cultural Welfare and to Nation Building.

== St Lucia ==
Appointments made by The King on the advice of his ministers in St Lucia.

=== Most Distinguished Order of St Michael and St George ===
Order of St Michael and St George ribbon

==== Companion of the Order of St Michael and St George (CMG) ====
- Felix Finisterre. For services to Community Services, Development and Outreach Programmes towards Alleviating Poverty.

=== Most Excellent Order of the British Empire ===
Civil division ribbon

==== Officer of the Order of the British Empire (OBE) ====
Civil

- Julian Desmond Charles. For services to Community Services, Development and Outreach Programmes towards Alleviating Poverty.

==== Member of the Order of the British Empire (MBE) ====
Civil

- Examin Zephirina Philbert. For services to Community Services, Development and Outreach Programmes towards Alleviating Poverty.
- Anthony Philgence. For services to Community Services, Development and Outreach Programmes towards Alleviating Poverty.

=== British Empire Medal (BEM) ===
Civil division ribbon

Civil

- Allison Celia George. For services to Community Services, Development and Outreach Programmes towards Alleviating Poverty.
- Hubert Frederick George James. For services to Community Services, Development and Outreach Programmes towards Alleviating Poverty.
- Russell D’Vere Andrew Lake. For services to Community Services, Development and Outreach Programmes towards Alleviating Poverty.
- George Nicholas. For services to Community Services, Development and Outreach Programmes towards Alleviating Poverty.
- Orlando Satchell. For services to Community Services, Development and Outreach Programmes towards Alleviating Poverty.
- Hilary Augustin Vidal. For services to Community Services, Development and Outreach Programmes towards Alleviating Poverty.

== St Vincent and the Grenadines ==
Appointments made by The King on the advice of his ministers in St Vincent and the Grenadines.

=== Most Distinguished Order of St Michael and St George ===
Order of St Michael and St George ribbon

==== Knight Commander of the Order of St Michael and St George (KCMG) ====
- Jeremiah Scott. For services to Politics, to National Development and to Youth Empowerment.

==== Companion of the Order of St Michael and St George (CMG) ====
- Felix Finisterre. For services to Community Services, Development and Outreach Programmes towards Alleviating Poverty.

=== Most Excellent Order of the British Empire ===
Civil division ribbon

==== Officer of the Order of the British Empire (OBE) ====
Civil

- Paul Marcus Wendell De Freitas. For services to Representational Politics, to Business, and to Community Service.
- Anella Frances De Roche. For services to Education, to Business and to Community Service.

==== Member of the Order of the British Empire (MBE) ====
Civil

- Dennis Thaddous Forde. For services to Sailing, to Entrepreneurship and to Community Service.
- Ian Edgerton Sardine. For services to the Sporting Community and to Youth Development.
- Pamela Hazel Veira. For services to Business, to Economic Development and to Community Advancement.

== Belize ==
Appointments made by The King on the advice of his ministers in Belize.

=== Most Excellent Order of the British Empire ===
Civil division ribbon

==== Officer of the Order of the British Empire (OBE) ====
Civil

- Brett Benton Feinstein. For services to Business, to Manufacturing and to Agriculture.
- Adrian Vincent Roe For services to Enterprise and to Community Service.

== Other nations ==
Below are awards made by Commonwealth and non-Commonwealth nations that have been authorised by Charles III in his right as King of the United Kingdom as part of the Operational Honours.

=== NATO ===
==== NATO Meritorious Service Medal ====
NATO Meritorious Service Medal ribbon

- Chief Petty Officer Engineering Technician (Marine Engineering Submarines) M R Impey
- Lieutenant Colonel A J Liva Royal Marines
- Lieutenant Colonel (Retired) J B Lockhart Royal Marines
- Captain S F Simpson Royal Navy

=== United States of America ===
==== Legion of Merit ====
Legion of Merit (Officer) ribbon

Legion of Merit (Legionnaire) ribbon

===== Officer of the Legion of Merit =====
- Rear Admiral Mark Edgar John Anderson, CBE Royal Navy
- Brigadier B E Halsted, MBE Royal Marines

===== Legionnaire of the Legion of Merit =====
- Captain D J S McKnight Royal Navy

==== Air Medal ====
Air Medal ribbon

- Lieutenant (Retired) D Telfer Royal Navy
