= La Anonima =

Supermarket chain in Argentina

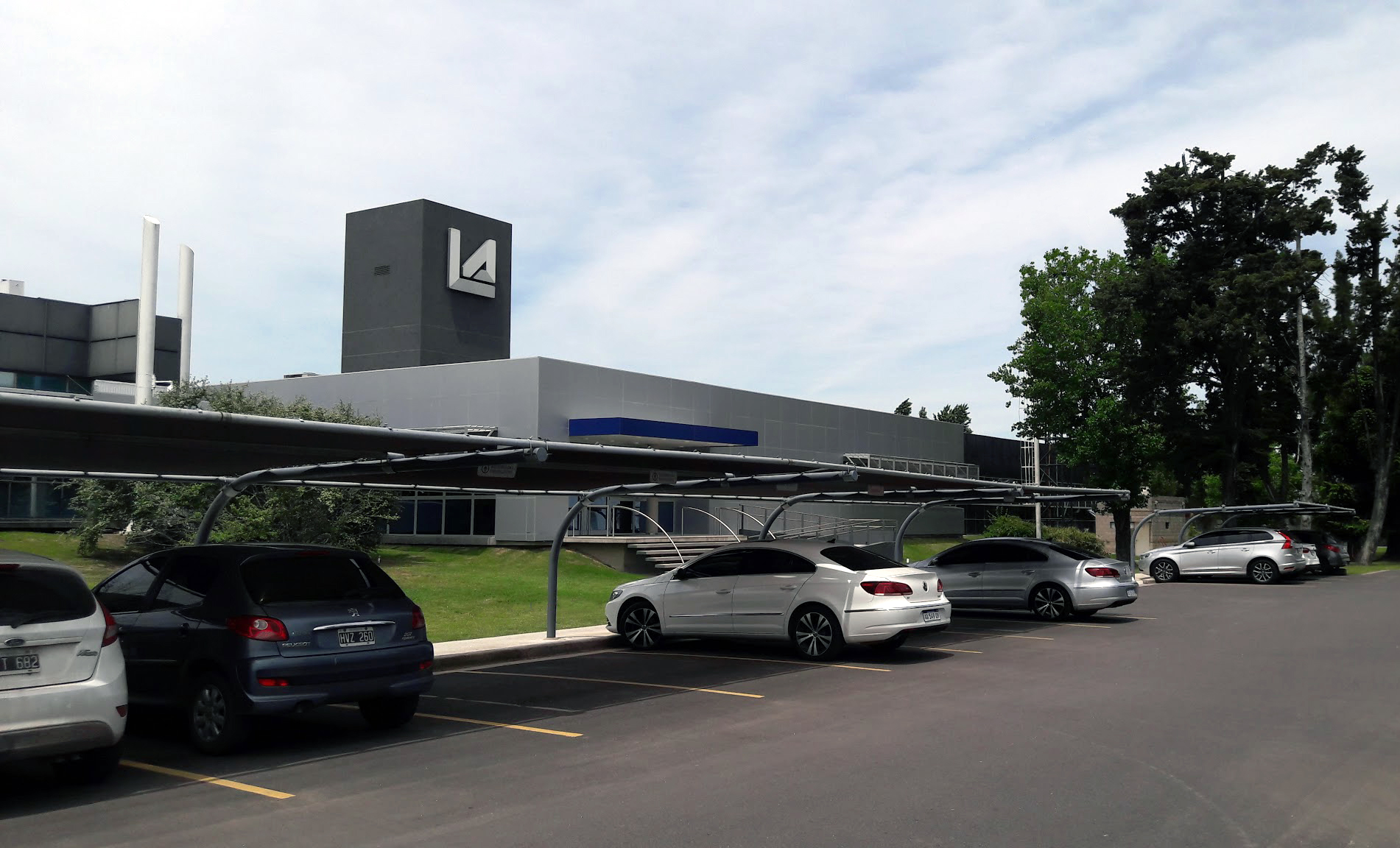
- La Anonima's headquarters in Ituzaingó, Buenos Aires
- Type: Public (S.A.)
- Traded as: BCBA: PATA
- Industry: Retail
- Founded: Trelew, Chubut, 1908
- Headquarters: Ituzaingó, Buenos Aires, Argentina,
- Key people: Federico Braun (CEO)
- Revenue: ▲US$1.37 billion (2018)
- Operating income: ▼US$24.22 million (2018)
- Net income: ▼US$−4.47 million (2018)
- Total assets: ▲US$398.52 million (2018)
- Number of employees: 11,500
- Website: laanonima.com

S.A. Importadora y Exportadora de la Patagonia, doing business as La Anónima, is an Argentine chain of supermarkets that operates mainly in the region of Patagonia.

Formats consist of mostly mid-size supermarkets, as well as some hypermarkets that are usually anchors for shopping malls. Stores carry both standard brand names and private label brands, such as La Anonima and Best. The company also operates two major meat packing plants, and some of its products are exported to other countries. Today, La Anonima has 162 branches in 83 cities across Argentina and its workforce consists of 11,500 employees, making it, as of 2015, the fifth-biggest supermarket chain in the country by sales.

== History ==
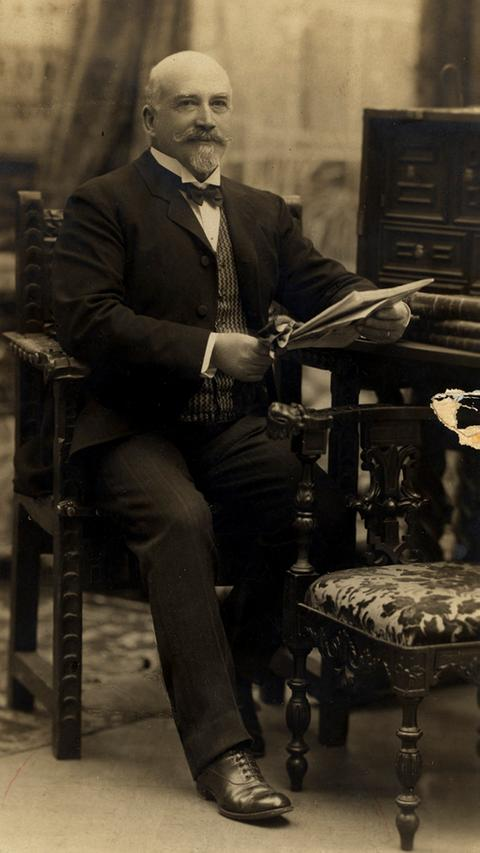
Jose Menendez

At the end of the 19th century, José Menéndez was a powerful landowner, colonizer, banker, industrialist and owner of a shipping company. His company's main trading post was set up in Punta Arenas, Chile, while also maintaining numerous establishments in Argentine territory.

In 1908, Menéndez, Mauricio Braun and Gastón Blanchard merged their respective companies and founded the Sociedad Anonima Importadora y Exportadora de la Patagonia (Import and Export Company of Patagonia), initially based in Punta Arenas, passing into Argentine jurisdiction in 1910.

By 1911 it was operating several stores in a warehouse format, while also having a naval fleet as well as regular passenger and cargo transportation lines between Buenos Aires and Punta Arenas, with stopovers in several Argentine Patagonia ports, through the use of two ships made to order in Britain: the Argentine and the Asturian.

In 1918 the company moved its headquarters from Punta Arenas into Argentina at the request of the Argentine government.

Mr. Menendez died in Buenos Aires in 1918, never having lost his Spanish nationality. At the time, the president of the company was his son-in-law, Mauricio Braun (of German and Prussian descent), who remained in this position until 1932, when he was replaced by Carlos Menéndez Behety. By 1929 it had 25 branches in different locations within southern Argentina, in addition to 4 ships.

The Braun Menendez conglomerate worked in different areas, monopolizing much of the wool trade, meat packing industry and banking sector of Patagonia. Both families were part of the Sociedad Rural Argentina and together owned the Exploitation Company of Tierra del Fuego, having 430,000 hectares with 1,250,000 sheep that produced 5 million kilos of wool, as well as leather and meat. There they took part of the Selk'nam genocide.

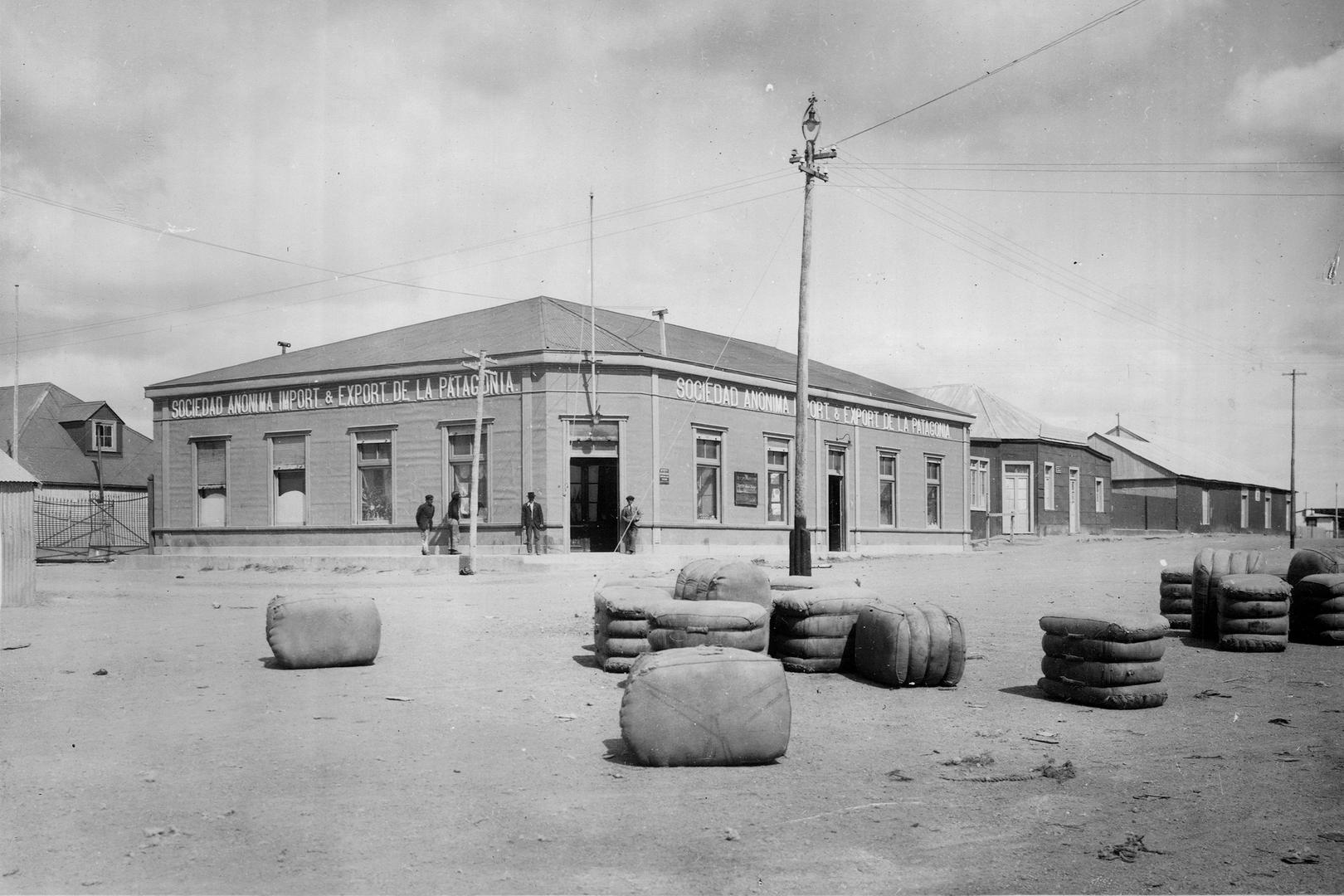
La Anonima, in the early 1920s

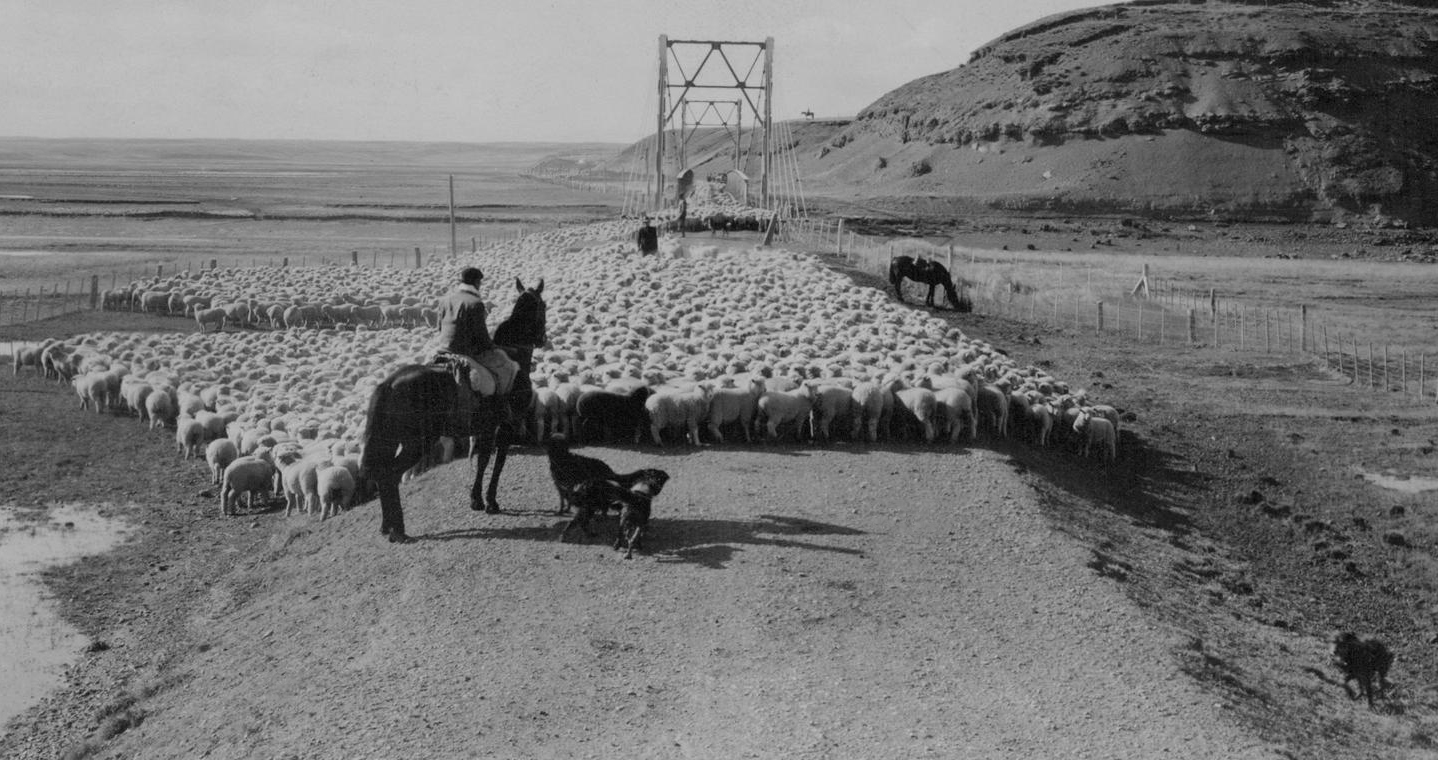
Sheep husbandry in Argentine Patagonia, late 19th century

Due to how long and complex the company name was, inhabitants of Patagonia simply called it "La Anónima" (literally, The Anonymous), and the name stuck. Between 1929 and 1968 La Anónima published the magazine La Argentina Austral, and also participated in the inauguration of the first radio programs in Comodoro Rivadavia and Río Gallegos. In 1942, the company opened its capital to public offering, trading in the Buenos Aires Stock Exchange since then.

In 1957, La Anónima and other partners created the airline Austral Líneas Aéreas, which eventually became the second-largest commercial airline in the country after Aerolíneas Argentinas. The name Austral reflects the Patagonian identity of its owners.

In 1967 the company started selling off various assets, including ships, warehouses and numerous buildings. During the same year, several warehouses were converted to the supermarket format, the Trelew location being the first, and this transition was completed in 1971.

In the early 1980s, the stock package was again concentrated in the Braun family, who assumed the current leadership of the company and launched a new strategy aimed at gaining leadership in the retail industry of the Patagonia region through a policy of growth, adopting new technologies and establishing a new corporate identity. The company is known for being an early adopter of innovative retail technology such as barcodes, in the 1980s.

== Present ==
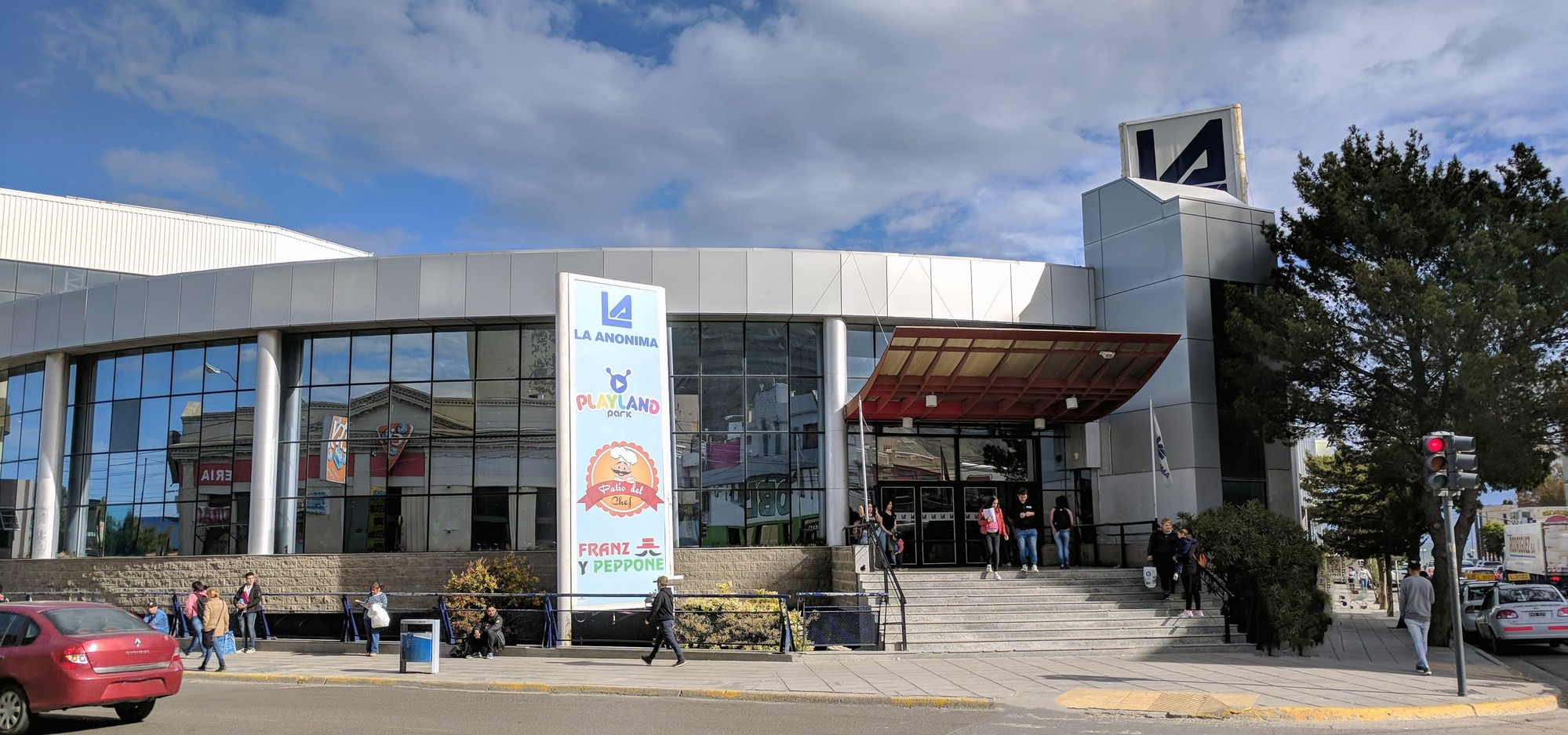
La Anonima in Comodoro Rivadavia

In 1991, the company opened a small chain of stores in a convenience store format under the Best name. This chain was sold in 2010 to French retailer Carrefour (which also operates its flagship banner in Argentina), although the Best name was retained as La Anonima's budget tier private label brand. Carrefour would later convert these stores into the Carrefour Express banner.

In 2000, La Anonima signed an agreement with French retailer Groupe Casino to sell Leader Price private label brand items in all of its locations. The Leader Price range covered an assortment of items, from food to clothing and was produced by suppliers from Argentina, Uruguay and France. At that time Casino was operating in Argentina a chain of hard discount stores also named Leader Price, but unrelated to La Anonima, that sold only Leader Price-branded items.

During Argentina's 2001 economic crisis, the company registered a severe drop in its turnover for the first time in its history. After consumer confidence was restored in the country in 2003, the company went through several years of uninterrupted growth in terms of revenue and profits.

In 2005 the company acquired from the Williner family a local supermarket chain, Quijote, that operated in a small area in Santa Fe. Eventually, the Quijote brand was phased out and the remaining stores were reopened under the La Anonima banner.

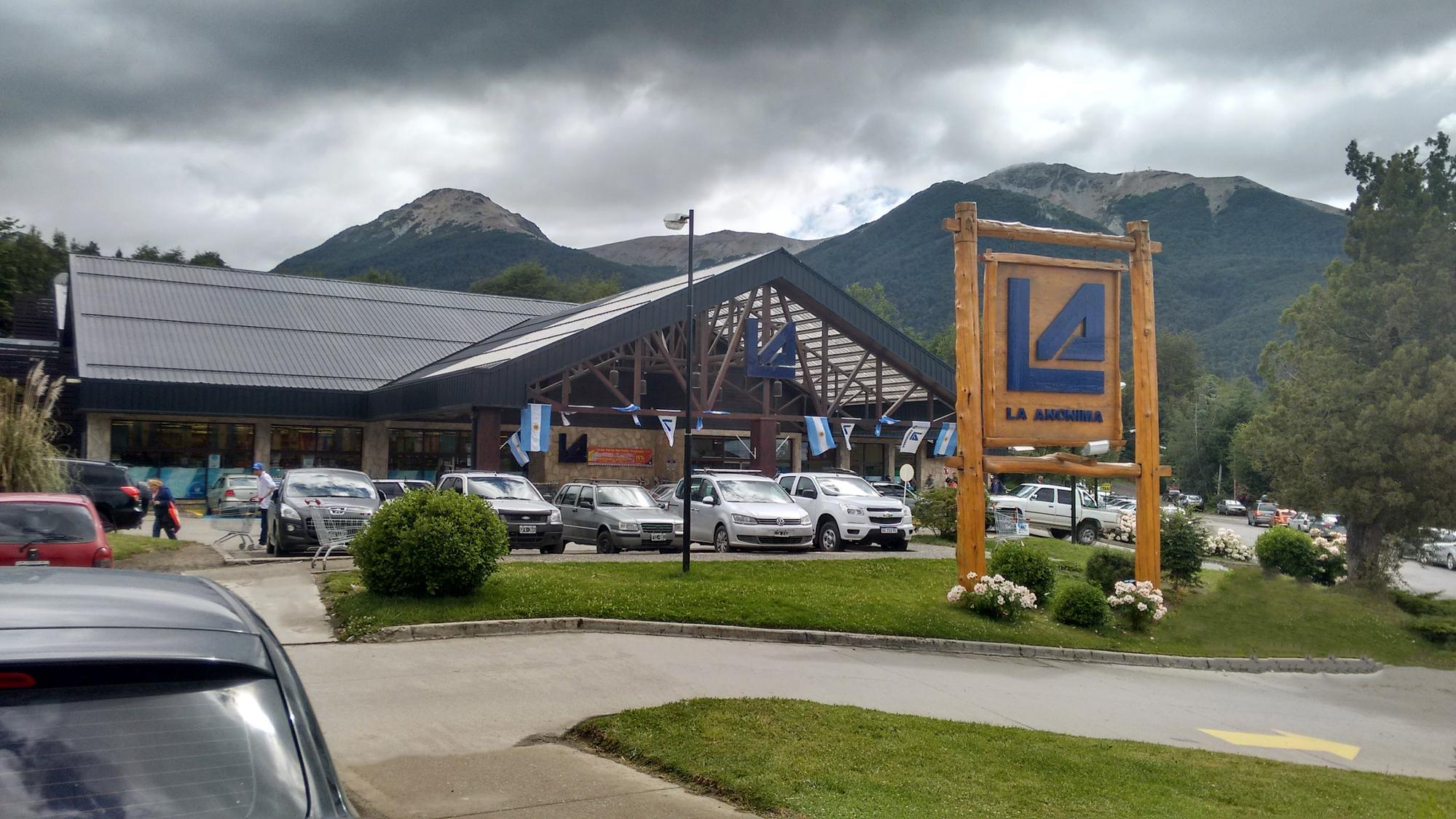
La Anonima in Villa La Angostura

In recent years the company has invested heavily in its meat processing and packing plants, as well as getting complete control of the Pampa Natural plant in 2017, after having partial ownership for several years. The output of the company's meat plants makes it the fifth-largest meat exporter within Argentina, supplying 2,400 tones of beef for the country's share in the Hilton Quota.

In 2009, the company launched its own credit card line, under a partnership with Tarjetas del Mar S.A. (a company which later it acquired), offering customers a no-interest line of credit for appliance purchases, among other benefits.

In 2017, the company became widely known in the country for several relatives of the Braun family that became part of the cabinet of the Macri administration. The involvement of family members in politics was not well received within the company, especially after the poor economic results of the new government, which resulted in the company's worst quarter since 2002.

On March 18, 2026, in a strategic move to expand its national presence, La Anónima finalized the acquisition of 12 branches belonging to the Libertad supermarket chain. This transaction also included a logistics center and the transfer of approximately 1,600 employees. This business deal represents a significant expansion of the Patagonian company's retail operations into the central and northern provinces of the country, allowing it to strengthen its commercial network, diversify its geographic reach, and consolidate its competitive position within Argentina.

== Locations ==
- Buenos Aires:
  - 9 de Julio
  - Ameghino
  - América
  - Arrecifes
  - Azul
  - Bragado
  - Carlos Casares
  - Carmen de Patagones
  - Chacabuco
  - Chivilcoy
  - Colón
  - General Villegas
  - Ituzaingó
  - Junín
  - Lincoln
  - Mercedes
  - Pehuajó
  - Salto
  - Trenque Lauquen
- Chubut:
  - Comodoro Rivadavia
  - Esquel
  - Gaiman
  - Playa Unión
  - Puerto Madryn
  - Rada Tilly
  - Rawson
  - Sarmiento
  - Trelew
  - Trevelin
- Córdoba:
  - Córdoba
  - Laboulaye
  - Marcos Juárez
  - Morteros
- La Pampa:
  - Eduardo Castex
  - General Pico
  - Intendente Alvear
  - Santa Rosa
- Misiones:
  - Posadas
- Neuquén:
  - Añelo
  - Centenario
  - Junín de los Andes
  - Neuquén
  - Plaza Huincul
  - Plottier
  - Rincón de los Sauces
  - San Martín de los Andes
  - San Patricio del Chañar
  - Villa La Angostura
  - Zapala
- Río Negro:
  - Allen
  - Bariloche
  - Catriel
  - Cinco Saltos
  - Cipolletti
  - Choele Choel
  - El Bolsón
  - General Fernandez Oro
  - General Roca
  - Las Grutas
  - Río Colorado
  - San Antonio Oeste
  - Sierra Grande
  - Viedma
  - Villa Regina
- Salta:
  - Salta
- San Juan:
  - San Juan
- Santa Cruz:
  - 28 de Noviembre
  - Caleta Olivia
  - El Calafate
  - Gobernador Gregores
  - Las Heras
  - Perito Moreno
  - Pico Truncado
  - Piedra Buena
  - Puerto Deseado
  - Puerto Santa Cruz
  - Río Gallegos
  - Río Turbio
  - San Julián
- Santa Fe:
  - Esperanza
  - Rafaela
  - Rosario
  - Rufino
  - San Jorge
  - San Justo
  - Venado Tuerto
- Santiago del Estero:
  - Santiago del Estero
- Tierra del Fuego:
  - Río Grande
  - Tolhuin
  - Ushuaia
- Tucumán:
  - San Miguel de Tucumán

== Gallery ==
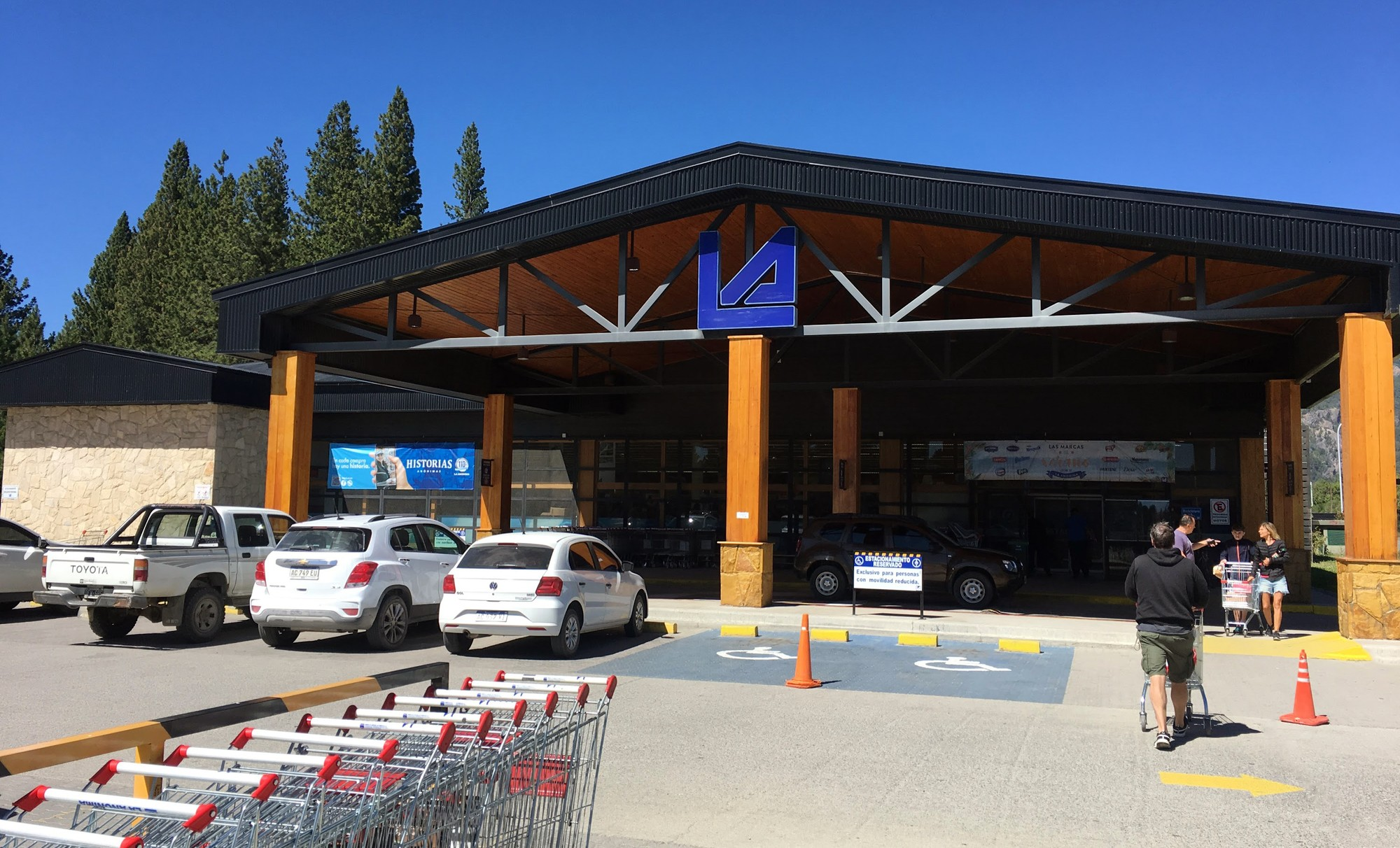
La Anonima in Bariloche

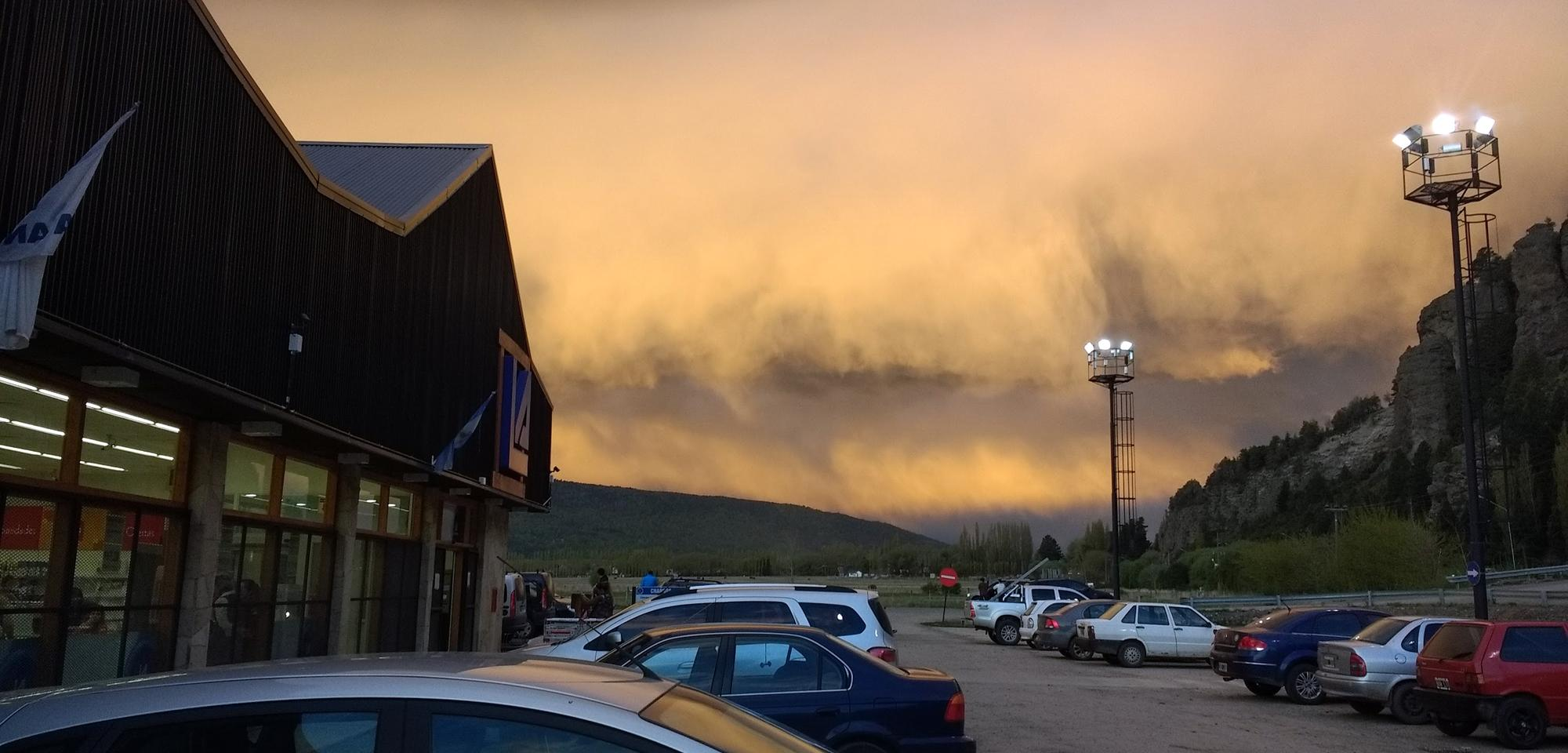
La Anonima in San Martín de los Andes

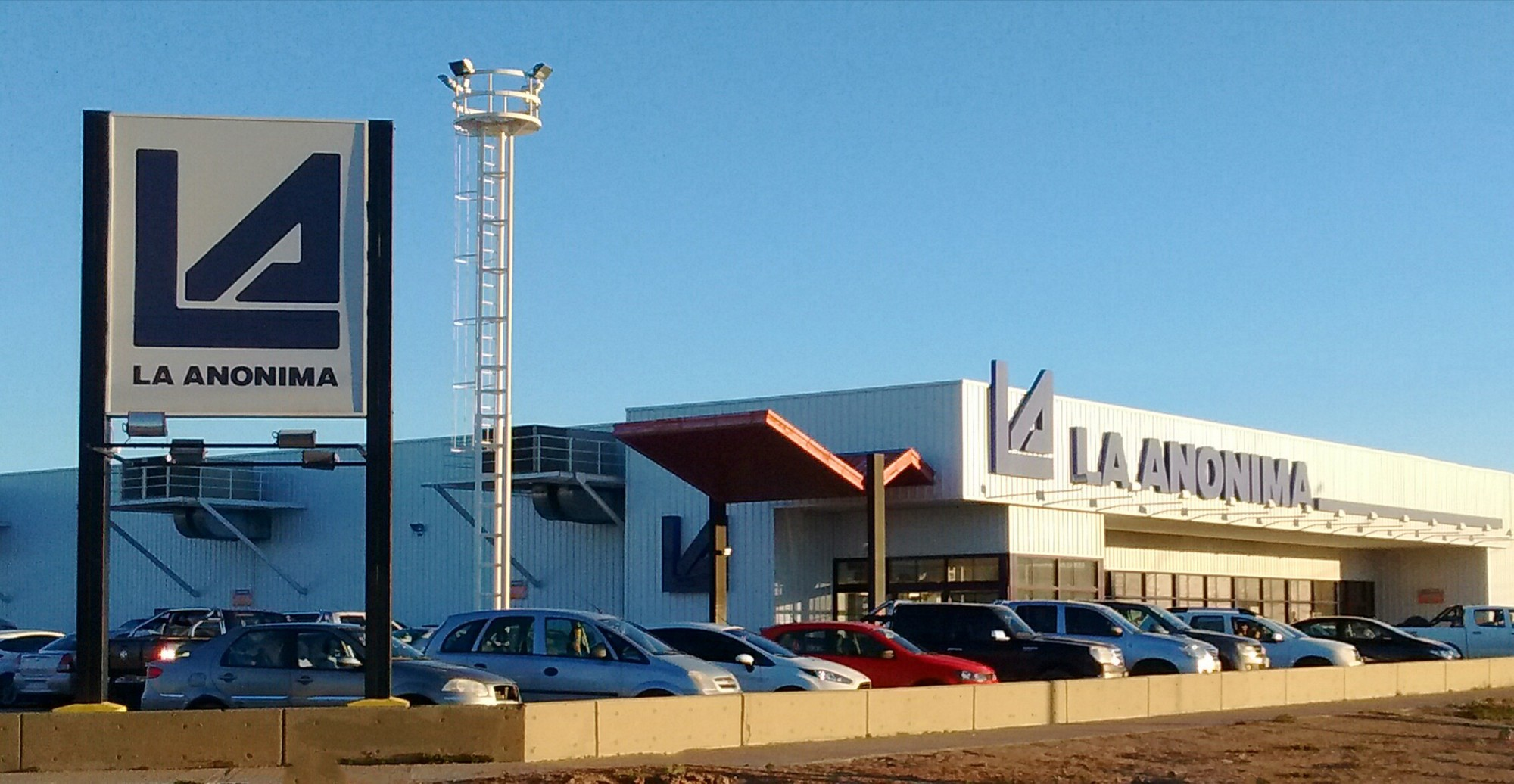
La Anonima in Puerto Madryn

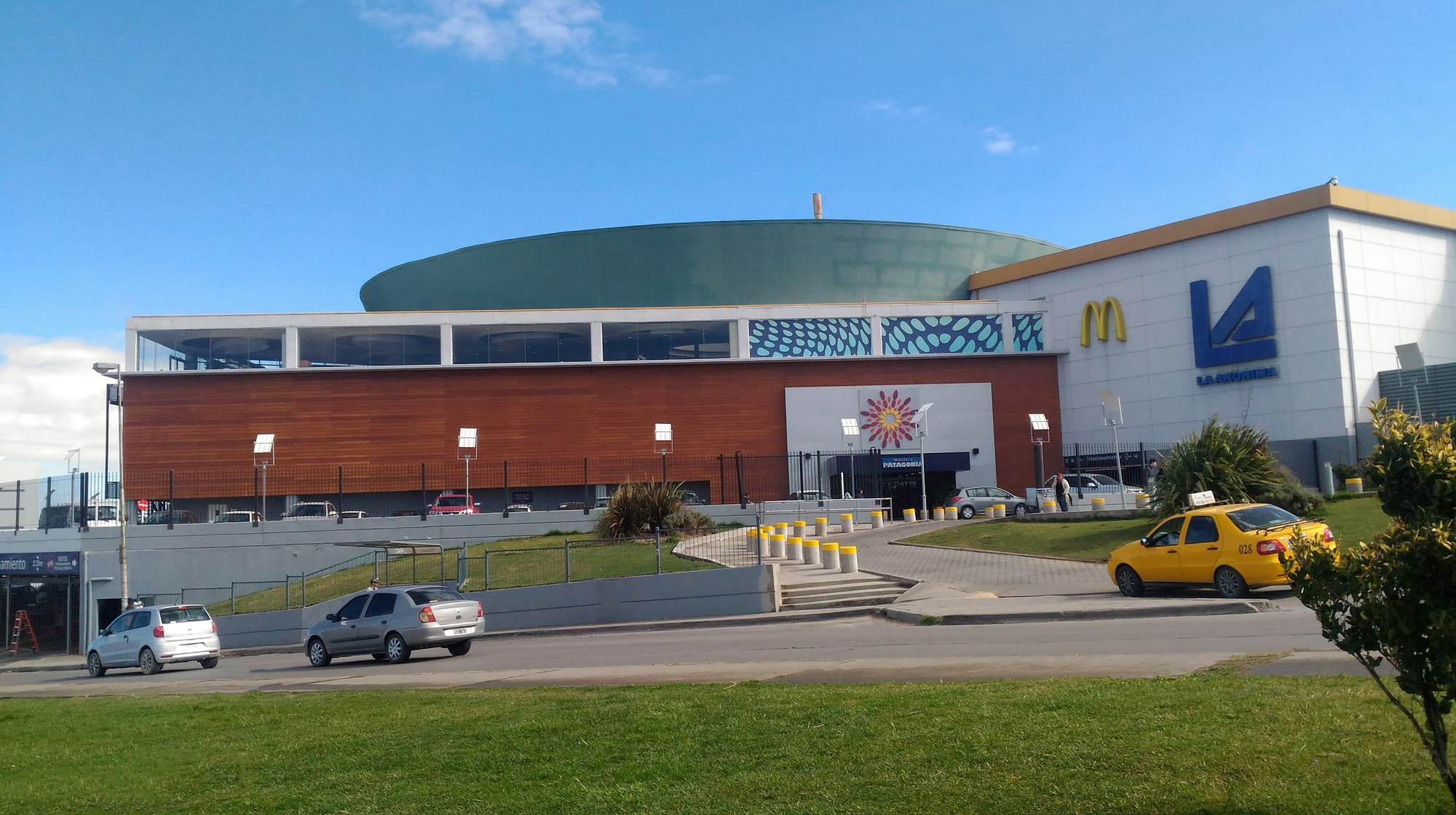
La Anonima in Neuquén

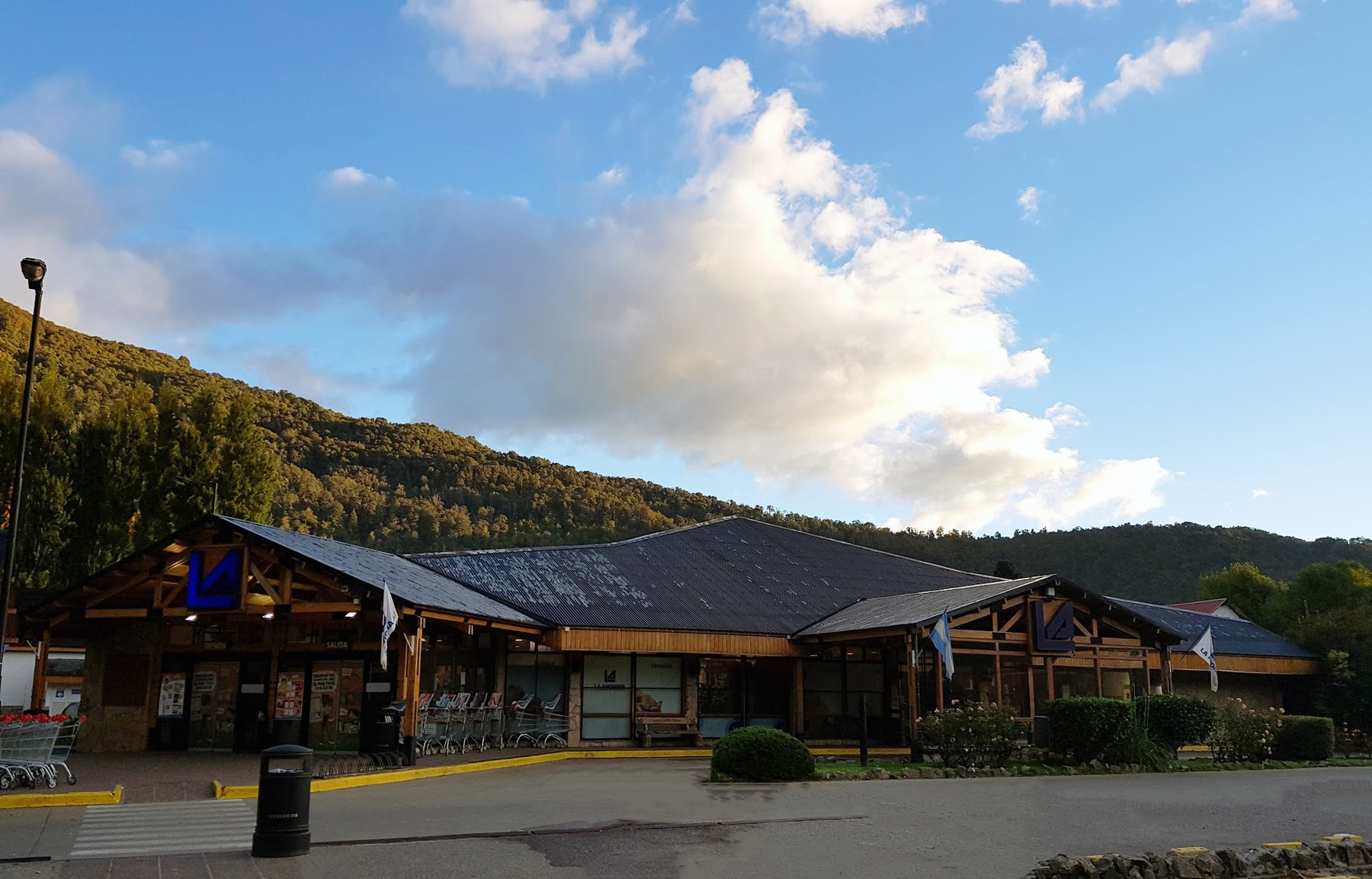
La Anonima in San Martín de los Andes

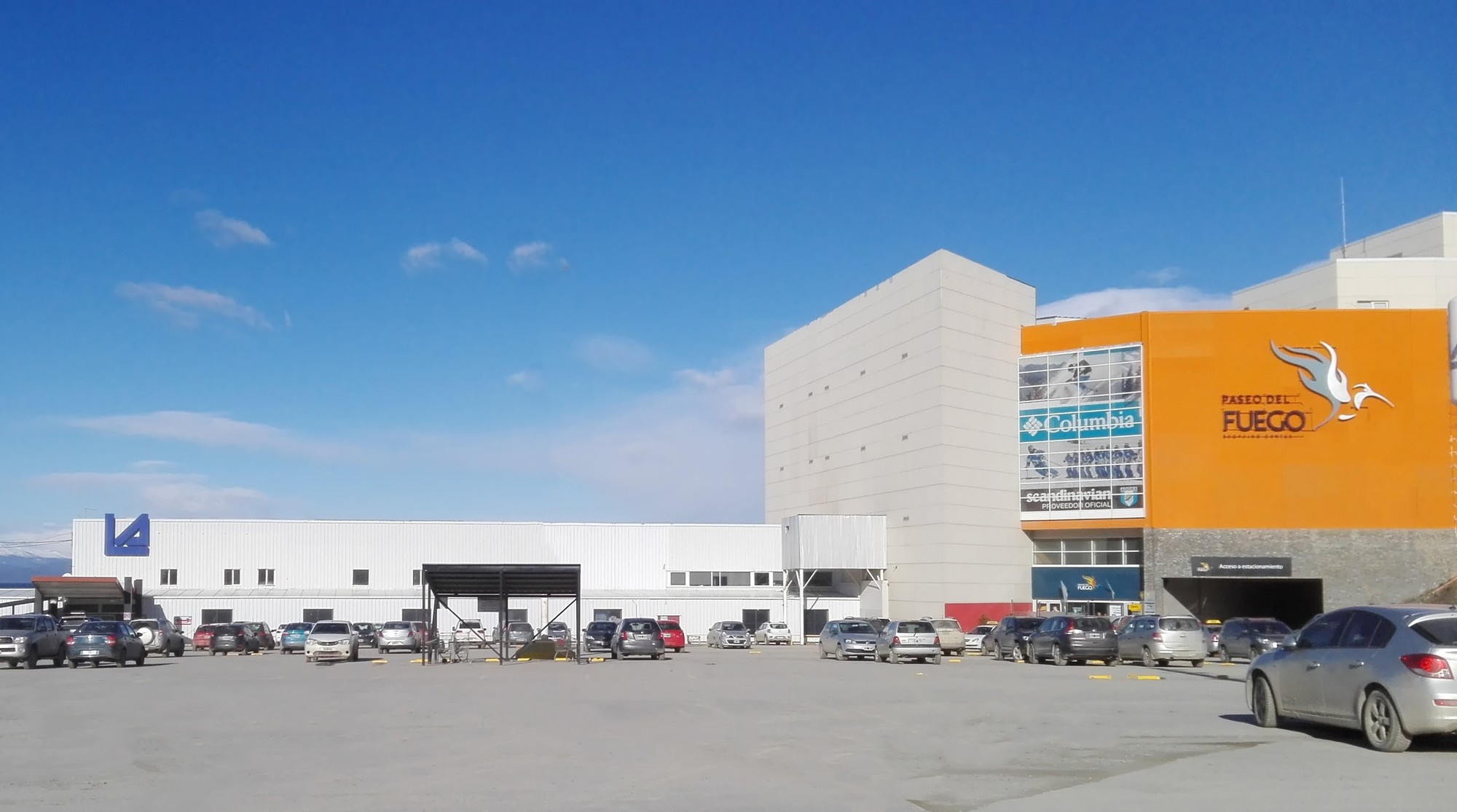
Store number 38 in Ushuaia, together with Paseo del Fuego Shopping Center
