= José Menéndez =

Spanish businessman and perpetrator of the Selkʼnam genocide (1846–1918)

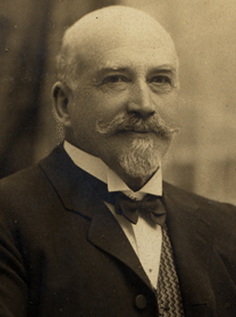
- Menéndez in the early 20th century
- Born: November 2, 1846; Santo Domingo de Miranda (Avilés), Spain
- Died: April 24, 1918 (aged 71); Buenos Aires, Argentina
- Occupation: Businessman
- Known for: Founder of businesses in Patagonia
- Spouse: María Behety Chapital (m. 1873)
- Children: 9

José Menéndez Menéndez (1846–1918) was a Spanish businessman based in Argentina and Chilean Patagonia. He was the initiator of many large companies that remain to this day.

Twenty-first century scholarship has uncovered the history of Menéndez and his business partners in the Braun family in the genocide of the Indigenous Selkʼnam people of Patagonia.

== Early years ==
Menéndez was born in Santo Domingo de Miranda (Avilés), Spain, on November 2, 1846, the second child of seven from the marriage of Manuel Menéndez Cañedo and Alvarez, and María Menéndez Granda, peasants of modest means. Agricultural labor prevented him from receiving a formal education, but he managed to acquire the rudiments of literacy and numeracy, thanks to his maternal uncle Joseph who was a teacher. At a young age he left his homeland in search of opportunity in the Americas, passing through the island of Cuba, and finally settling in Argentina.

In 1866 José Menéndez Menéndez arrived in Buenos Aires. He was employed as a bookkeeper in the firms of Corti Riva and Co. and then Etchart and Co. These jobs familiarized him with the shipping business, a sector that years later would develop in Patagonia, where he worked as a merchant, businessman and in cattle shipping.

== Personal life ==
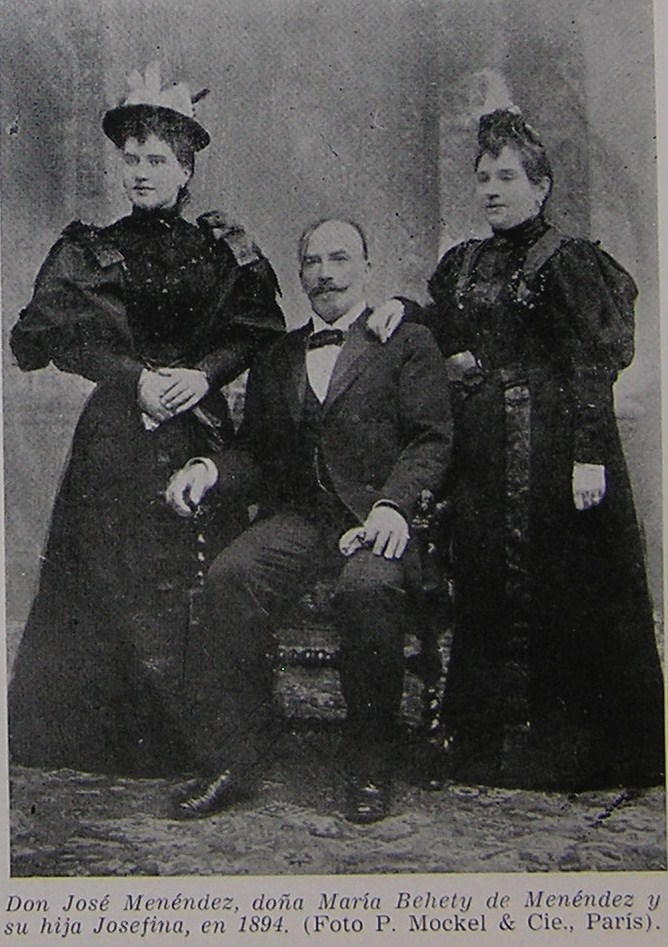
Menéndez, with his daughter Josefina (left) and wife Maria, Paris, 1894

On March 19, 1873, he married María Behety Chapital, born on May 24, 1848, in Montevideo, the daughter of the French Basque couple Félix Behety and María Chapital. The wedding was held at the Church of La Merced, Buenos Aires, a city where the family settled for a while. The couple had nine children:

- Alejandro and Josefina, born in Buenos Aires.
- José, Julio and María, born in Punta Arenas, Chile. María died as an infant of pulmonary ailments.
- María (II), Alfonso, Carlos and Herminia, also born in Punta Arenas.

During the 1877 military revolt in Punta Arenas known as the Mutiny of the Artillerymen, the city suffered damage and acts of barbarism. María Behety lost a leg to gangrene from a wound caused by a stray bullet in the forest. Her leg was amputated by a doctor who had fled the city with them.

Josefina later married Mauricio Braun, a businessman and associate of Jose Menéndez, and Carlos, a lawyer, married Cristina García González Bonorino. María married businessman Francisco Campos Torreblanca.

== In Patagonia ==
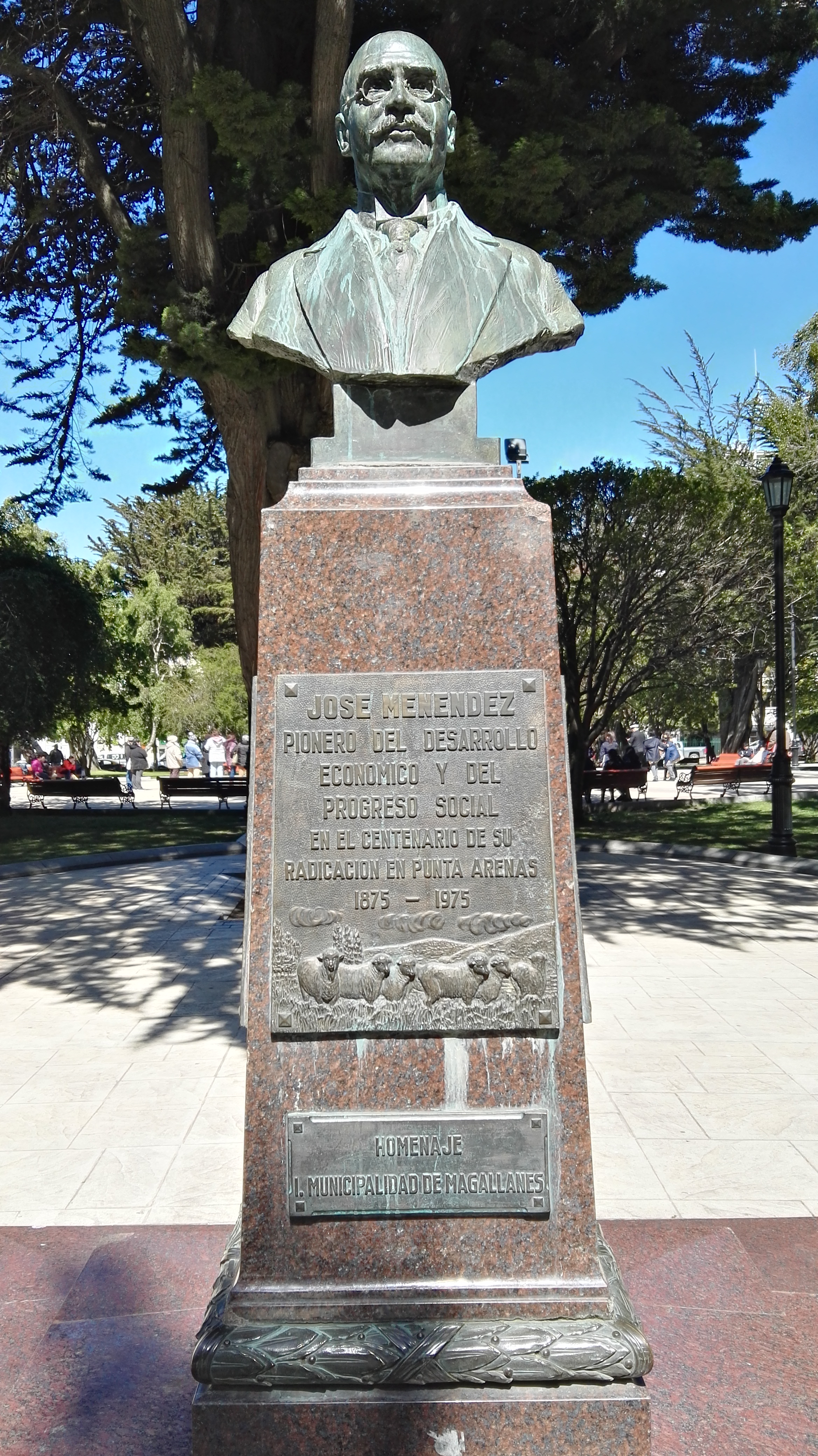
Bust of Menéndez in Punta Arenas

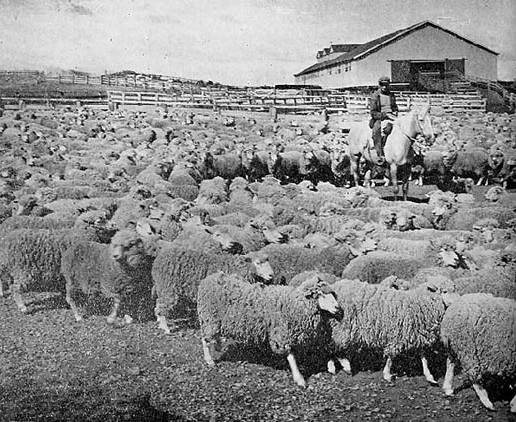
Sheep roundup for the processing and freezing SETF factory

In 1874 José Menéndez moved to Punta Arenas, Chile, which later became his residence and base of his core business. In 1876, he began sheep farming, carrying sheep from the Falkland Islands, founding the company "José Menéndez and Co." and the Estancia San Gregorio, now a historic site of the Chilean commune of the same name.

In September 1892 he bought a used ship, the Amadeo, which was the first ship he owned and the first steamship to be registered in Punta Arenas. On its maiden voyage, it carried bricks to build his family home. The Amadeo participated in the rescue of goods from the British merchantmen Duchess of Albany which, on a voyage from Rio de Janeiro to Valparaíso, ran aground on 13 July 1893 in Policarpo Cove in the southeast of Tierra del Fuego.

Although the Amadeo was declared a National Monument by the Chilean government in 1972, its hull remains stranded on the beaches of San Gregorio (Chile), on the Strait of Magellan, subject to the whims of the sea which is undermining its structure, so that only a pile of iron remains. The Chilean state's attempts to restore the ship have always been met by refusal from Menéndez's descendants.

In 1893 he was one of the first group of shareholders of the Sociedad Explotadora de Tierra del Fuego (SETF), where he owned 200 shares and a share of over 15%. The Society set up a sheep empire that spanned much of Patagonia. Their main remaining site is the Cold Storage Plant of Bories, located in Puerto Bories, now converted into a hotel.

In 1893 José Menéndez participated in the launch of the Salesian mission of Nuestra Señora de la Candelaria, in Río Grande, transporting the materials necessary for the construction of the buildings on his steamship Amadeo. Father José María Beauvoir became concerned that Menéndez wanted the surrounding land for himself.

In 1896, he founded the Estancia "Prima Argentina" of 105,169 ha (259,880 acres) which he bought from the Argentinian Government. Today this is Estancia José Menéndez, located 17 km. southwest of the Rio Grande. Menéndez founded a new branch of his business in the city of Rio Gallegos, and shortly thereafter in the province of Santa Cruz.

In Punta Arenas, he built many of the houses and buildings including a theater.

Later, in 1897, he opened a second venture in livestock, after the success he had obtained in Estancia "Primera Argentina", he created the "Segunda Argentina", now called the Estancia "María Behety", located 15 km. northwest of the city of Rio Grande, where in 1905 he built the shearing shed which is still the largest of the world.

In 1903, he bought land adjacent to Gregory Bay on the Strait of Magellan, bringing his land ownership in Tierra del Fuego to 430,000 ha (1,100,000 acres).

In 1907, due to a financial crisis, he partnered with Mauricio Braun, previously his main business rival until Braun's marriage to Menéndez's daughter Josefina Menéndez Behety,

After becoming one of the greatest landowners in the country, he then began new businesses. Among many others, he bought the Loreto mine; he created the enormous José Menéndez factory for fat-rendering and manufacturing of packaged meat, the base for the "Sociedad Explotadora de Tierra del Fuego"; he increased the company's maritime fleet; he began the stimulus for the creation of roads and highways in the south; and he organized banks and colonized vast southern regions.

In 1910, he founded the Behety Menéndez Cattle and Commercial Co., based in Punta Arenas. He then formed the Patagonia Import and Export Co. together with Mauricio Braun and Juan Blanchard. Its activities included convenience stores, cattle farms and a shipping fleet. In the 1960s most of the assets of the company were liquidated and gave impetus to the supermarket chain La Anónima with over one hundred branches throughout Argentine Patagonia and the center of the province of Buenos Aires. Although at the end of the 20th century the shareholding was concentrated in the heirs of the Braun family, this well-known Argentine company has its origins in the business enterprise of José Menéndez and Mauricio Braun.

== Genocide of the Selkʼnam people ==
In the 21st century, the Historical Truth Commission of 2008 and related scholarship uncovered the involvement of the Menéndez and Braun families in the genocide of the Selkʼnam people, calling into question their previously laudable reputation.

Current historiography points to José Menéndez and the rest of the ranchers of Tierra del Fuego (Mauricio Braun, and José Montes) as the main causes of the extermination of the indigenous Selkʼnam people, who largely disappeared after of the establishment of the first livestock ranches. The main murderer of indigenous people, Alexander MacLennan, was an employee of José Menéndez, from whom he received direct orders. MacLennan's solution to the "indigenous issue" was "It's better to put a bullet in them."

Attempts to disassociate MacLennan's actions from José Menéndez's instructions, indicating that the Scotsman was acting on his own, do not hold up since he was administrator of the Estancia "Primera Argentina" for twelve years and, when he retired, Menéndez gave MacLennan a valuable gold watch in recognition of his outstanding service.

== Death ==
José Menéndez died on April 24, 1918 aged 71 in Buenos Aires, where he owned a residence. He was buried in the cemetery in Punta Arenas.
