= Sara Braun =

Latvian-Chilean businesswoman

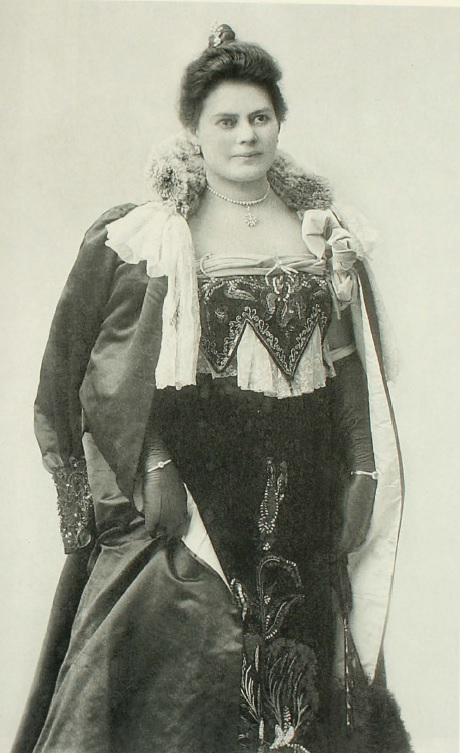
- Braun, c. 1900
- Born: 17 December 1862; Talsi, Courland, Russian Empire
- Died: 22 April 1955 (aged 92); Viña del Mar, Chile
- Other names: Sara Braun de Nogueira, Sara Braun Hamburger, Sara Braun Hamburger de Nogueira, Sara Braun Hamburger de Valenzuela Crespo, Sara Braun Hamburguer
- Occupations: businesswoman, philanthropist
- Years active: 1874–1948
- Spouses: José Nogueira (m. 1887; died 1893) Leoncio Valenzuela Crespo (m. 1901; ann. 1929)

Sara Braun (17 December 1862 – 22 April 1955) was a Latvian-born Chilean businesswoman who became one of the principal employers in Patagonia. After emigrating with her family from the Russian Empire to escape persecution because of their Jewish heritage, the family toured Europe and then looked for work in Argentina and Paraguay, before moving to Magallanes, now known as Punta Arenas, in 1874.

Educated in the public school system, Braun soon joined her father to help administer the naval warehouse of the Portuguese shipping magnate José Nogueira, whom she married in 1887. The two worked together to build a business empire. When Nogueira died in 1893, Braun took over his leases to land in Tierra del Fuego and took control of his commercial, industrial and shipping interests. She also established an import trading house and group of warehouses, becoming one of the first women to run a business in the area.

With the help of her brother, Mauricio Braun, she established the Sociedad Explotadora de Tierra del Fuego (Society for the Exploitation of Tierra del Fuego) in August 1893 to engage in sheep farming. Through family ties and astute trading, they created a monopolistic company which controlled sheep production in the region and significantly influenced the development of southern Chile.

Involved in many charitable endeavors, Braun was celebrated for her benevolence. Later scholarship has uncovered the history of the Braun family and their business partners in the Menéndez family in the genocide of the Selkʼnam people. Her mansion is preserved as a museum in Punta Arenas, and the Sara Braun Foundation, established at her death, provides scholarship funds to students for higher education.

== Early life ==
Sara Braun was born on 17 December 1862 (Note: Toledo gives her date of birth as the 16th, but Gallegos reproduced text in Braun's will stating nacido el diecisiete de Diciembre de mil ochocientos sesenta y dos en Talsen, ciudad de la provincia báltica de Curlandia [born on 17 December 1862 in Talsen, a city in the Baltic Province of Courland].) in Talsi, in Courland (now Latvia) in the Russian Empire to Sofía Hamburger and Elías Braun. She was the oldest of seven siblings: Mauricio, Oscar, Ana, Fanny, Mayer, and Juan. Her father was a tinsmith and the family was of Jewish heritage.

Threatened by the persecution of Jews in the Pale of Settlement, the family moved abroad, first touring Europe and then settling in Buenos Aires, Argentina, in 1872. Unable to find stable employment, they traveled back and forth between Paraguay and Argentina looking for work. At the time, Guillermo Blest Gana, a Chilean diplomat, was seeking recruits to relocate to the Magallanes Region of his country. The Braun family agreed to travel to Magallanes, now known as Punta Arenas, in 1874. Joining 46 other immigrants, they arrived in February of that year, when Braun was 12.

== Career ==
=== Early career ===
Educated in the public school in Magallanes, Braun helped her parents raise her younger siblings. As the family integrated into the town's society, they met José Nogueira, a Portuguese shipping magnate. Braun's father gained Nogueira's trust and was hired to oversee his naval warehouse, and Sara helped her father with the administration of the depot.

By the middle of the 1880s, Nogueira had become one of the wealthiest businessmen of the area and proposed to Braun. The couple married in 1887, when Noguiera was 42 and Sara was 24. With his wife and her family, Noguiera intended to create businesses in the southern zones to capitalize on the farming opportunities, but died before that was fully accomplished. Braun was actively engaged in the Braun Nogueira businesses, offering her advice and vision to her husband. In April 1889, Nogueira was able to secure a lease from the government of 180,000 hectares (440,000 acres) of Fuegian land, and seven months later, his brother-in-law Mauricio Braun leased another 170,000 hectares (420,000 acres).

The following year Nogueira acquired, along with Braun, a 20-year lease for 1,009,000 hectares (2,490,000 acres) of additional land from President José Manuel Balmaceda's administration, with the proviso that he establish a Chilean business association to implement the project. Altogether, the leases gave Nogueira and his relatives control over one third of the 3,000,000 hectares (7,400,000 acres) of land available in Tierra del Fuego.

In order to meet the requirement for the enterprise to be Chilean (as neither Nogueira or Braun were, at the time) Nogueira agreed to sell one third of his lease rights to Ramón Serrano Montaner. Before he could complete the incorporation of the Sociedad Explotadora de Tierra del Fuego (Society for the Exploitation of Tierra del Fuego), Nogueira died in 1893. Braun began assuming management of all of his enterprises, with the "permanent help of her brothers Mauricio and Oscar", "becoming the first businesswoman in the history of Magallanes".

=== Society for the Exploitation of Tierra del Fuego ===
Having inherited all but Serrano's interest in her husband's estate, Braun approached her brother Mauricio for advice on how best to settle the debt with Serrano. After a difficult negotiation between the two men, Serrano agreed to accept one hundred shares of the company stock, instead of the lease. The company was incorporated on 31 August 1893. The major shareholders were Braun, her brother Mauricio, and the rest of their family; Juan Blanchard, a partner in the firm Braun & Blanchard; and Peter H. McClelland, the head of the firm Duncan, Fox & Co Ltd. This group controlled almost half of the company shares; the balance of shares, in order to ensure that a majority of investors were Chilean, belonged to sundry business people from Magallanes and Valparaíso. (Note: The initial distribution of shares figures are unknown. The first extant records date to 1909 and show that majority shareholders were Duncan, Fox & Co with 108,210; Sara Braun with 82,750; Mauricio Braun with 59,800; José Menéndez with 44,600; Ramón Serrano Montaner with 22,000; and Enrique Richard with 19,000 shares. By 1920, Sara Braun was the largest individual shareholder with 94,400 shares, exceeded only by the Compañía de Custodia de Valores (Custodial Securities Company) which controlled 210,816 shares. Until her death, Braun was the largest individual shareholder of the establishment.) Initially the company engaged in sheep farming, and the auctioning of livestock and land.

Besides the land leases in Patagonia, Braun inherited Nogueira's other commercial, industrial and shipping interests, and established an import trading house and group of warehouses. She formed a livestock company with McClelland and began importing sheep. Initially, the business also brought in foreign administrators and sheep tenders, as well as industrial technology to equip the farm for shearing and wool processing. As the company grew, local laborers were trained to take on many of the positions in the company. The Exploitation Society's reputation for providing for workers, which included allowing laborers to buy food on credit until the next seasonal hiring, made the business a popular employer.

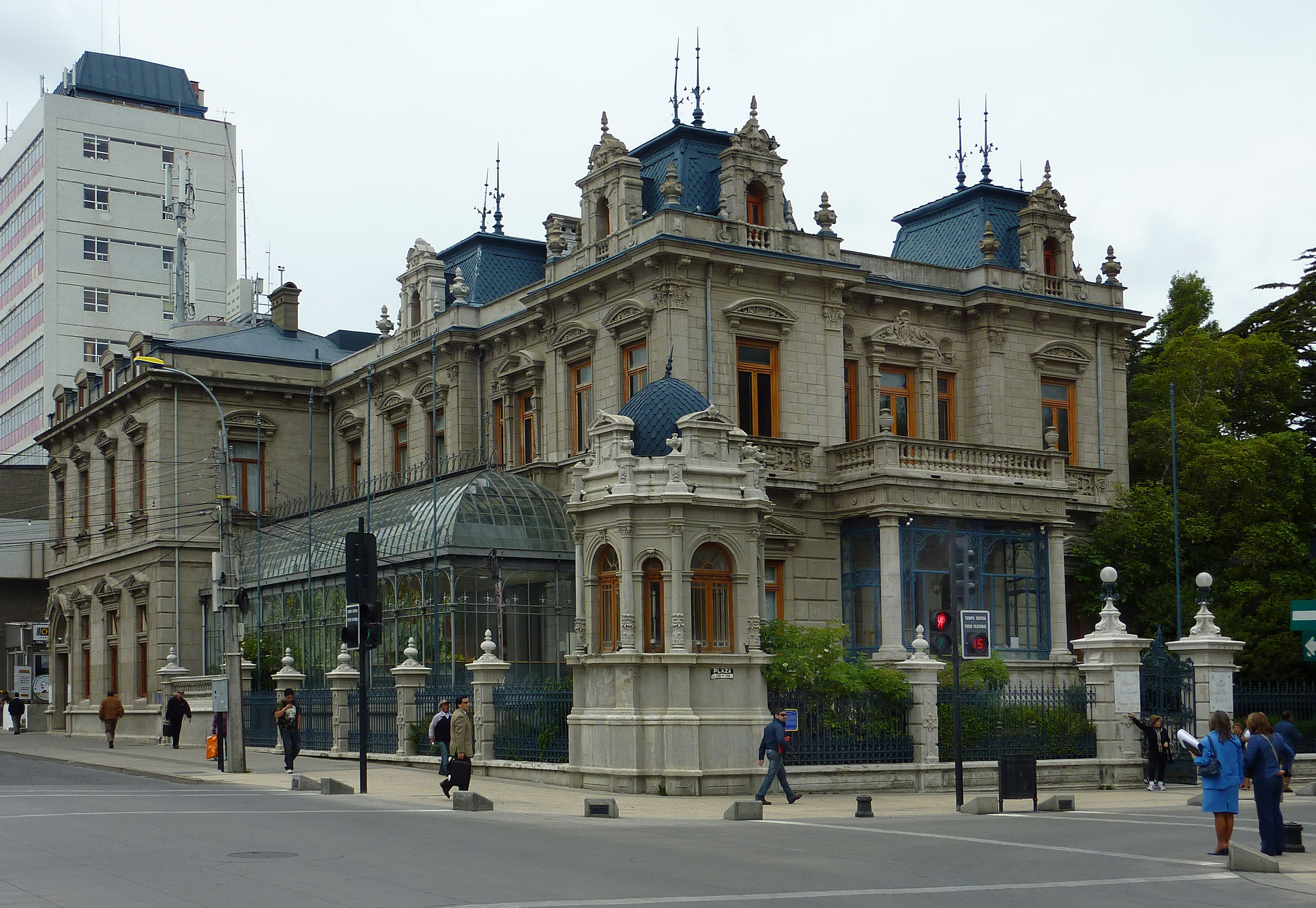
Palacio Sara Braun, exterior

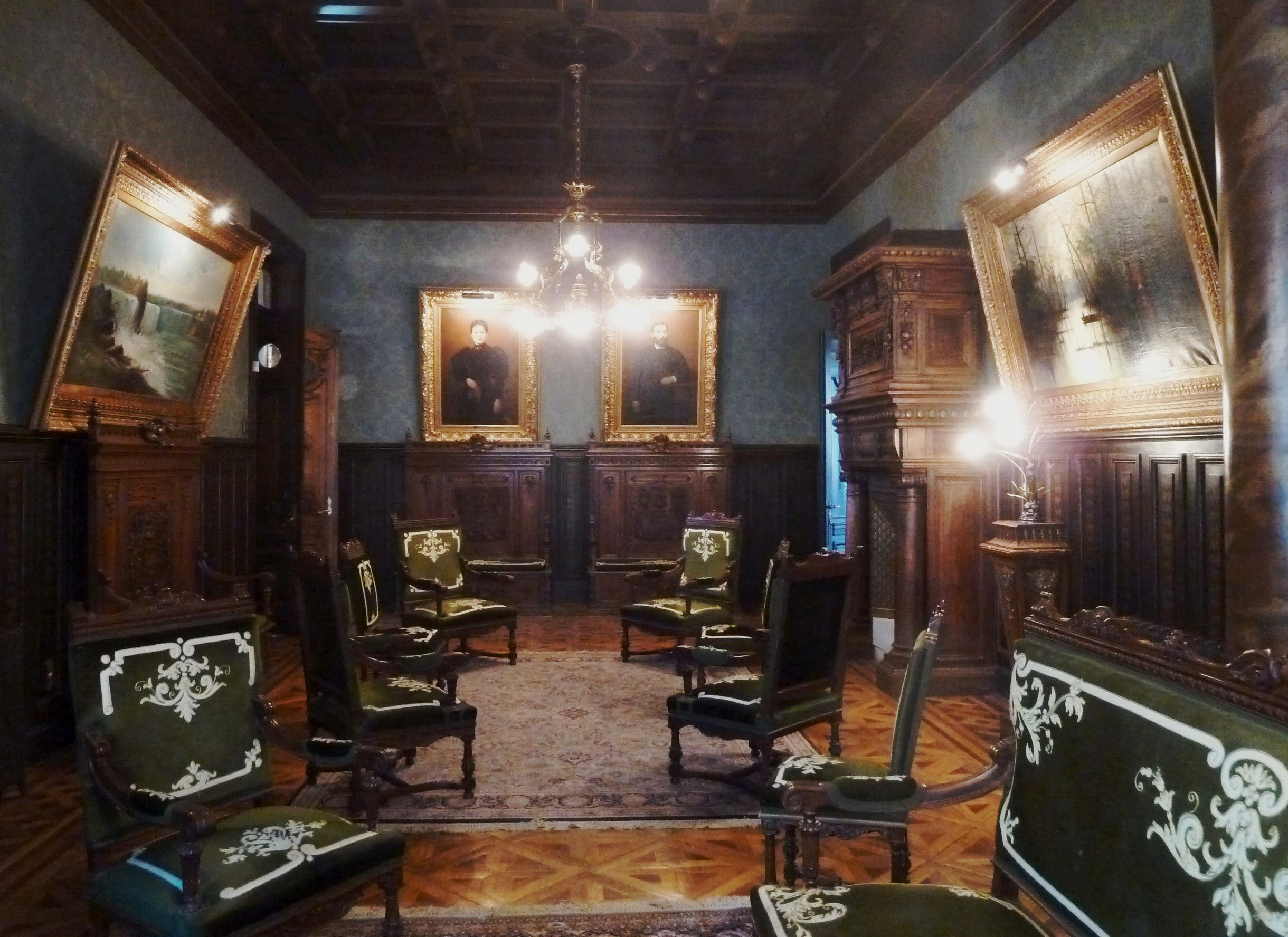
Palacio Sara Braun, interior

In 1895, Braun hired Numa Mayer, a French architect, to construct a mansion for her at 716 Muñoz Gamero Plaza, in Magallanes. The French neoclassical building took more than 10 years to complete and featured a large winter garden conservatory and a columned portico. The interior featured European furnishings and ornamentation throughout.

In 1901, Braun married Leoncio Valenzuela Crespo, a rear admiral in the Chilean Navy and a member of the Board of the Exploitation Society. The marriage was not successful and was annulled in 1929. By 1905, the Exploitation Society had expanded into neighboring territory in Argentine Patagonia. Through a series of negotiations and purchases of smaller investors in the region, by 1910, Braun and her partners controlled some 3,000,000 hectares (7,400,000 acres) of land. The expansion into Argentina led Braun to found the Sociedad Anónima Ganadera y Comercial Sara Braun (Sara Braun Livestock and Commercial Company) in 1914. This association was dedicated to managing the Estancia Pecket Harbour (Pecket Harbour Station).

=== Selkʼnam genocide ===
The Society's development of the sheep industry in Patagonia displaced the original inhabitants of those lands. The building of fences created obstacles for the nomadic life of the Selkʼnam people and introduction of sheep herds displaced their main food source, the guanaco. Facing starvation, they began to steal livestock. The Exploitation Society asked and received permission from the Chilean government to remove the indigenous population from the area. José Menéndez, one of the shareholders of the company, and Mauricio's father-in-law, gave orders for the extermination of the Selkʼnam.

In the 21st century, the Historical Truth Commission of 2008 and related scholarship uncovered the involvement of the Braun and Menéndez families in the genocide of the Selkʼnam people, calling into question their previously laudable reputation.

=== Humanitarian and charitable work ===
With the events of the Russian Revolution and World War I, a new international progressive movement led to less focus on business expansion and more attention to social issues, including the quality of life of workers. The Exploitation Society began to supply housing, which in some cases allowed workers to live with their families and provided food and wood allowances to ensure the health of the workforce and the heating of their homes.

Braun became involved with various charitable endeavors, including the Asilo de Huérfanos de Punta Arenas (the Orphan Asylum of Punta Arenas), the Chilean Red Cross, the Gota de Leche (Drop of Milk), Liga de las Damas Católicas, (League of Catholic Ladies), and the Sociedad de dolores de beneficencia (Charitable Society of Sorrows). She was also the patron of the Sixth Firemen's Company, donated land for building several schools, and was the donor for the portico at the entrance of the Punta Arenas Cemetery. On 7 June 1930, Braun became a naturalized citizen of Chile and moved to Viña del Mar, where she lived at 490 Álvarez Street.

In recognition of Braun's philanthropy, in 1936 the Ministry of Public Education renamed the Liceo de Niñas de Punta Arenas (Girls' Lyceum of Punta Arenas) in her honor. The government had already renamed the trade school attached to the Colegio María Auxiliadora after her in 1919. She was honored by the City of Punta Arenas as their Benefactora Pública (Public Benefactor) in 1945. Her last public appearance in Punta Arenas was in 1948, when she donated a building for the Red Cross to the city. At the time, she was ill and her brother Mauricio had to deliver her speech. In her last years, Braun was cared for by her niece, Fanny Gazitúa, daughter of Fanny Braun and Abraham Gazitúa Brieba. Pedro Poklepovic, a liberal politician who was married to Braun's niece Doris, managed her finances in the last years of her life.

== Death ==
Braun died at her home in Viña del Mar on 22 April 1955 and was buried in the Cemetery of Punta Arenas, officially known as the Cementerio Municipal Sara Braun. Because she had no children, she bequeathed her estate to her brother Juan Braun and her nieces and nephews. Her niece, Fanny Gazitúa, who had cared for her at the end of her life, was made an executor of the estate, inherited the home on Álvarez Street with all its contents, and was charged with establishing a Foundation bearing her name to provide higher education scholarships to students.

== Legacy ==
At the time of her death, Braun was mourned as a prominent citizen and philanthropist of Patagonia. Flags flew at half mast, businesses closed in her honor, and speeches were made by dignitaries. In addition to family members, Braun left over 15,000 shares of stock in the Exploitation Society to friends, servants, and acquaintances, who were involved in helping mitigate poverty, provide for underprivileged children or elders in need of care or were widows. She left outright stock donations to the various charities she had contributed to during her lifetime, as well as the San Juan de Dios Sanatorium of Viña del Mar; the Children's Hospital of Valparaíso; and the Sacred Family Asylum in Punta Arenas.

In 1981, Braun's mansion, which had been purchased intact with furnishings upon her death by the Union Club of Punta Arenas, was declared a Historic Monument, known as the Palacio Sara Braun.
