= Selkʼnam genocide =

1850–1930 genocide of indigenous people in Tierra del Fuego

- Part of Genocide of indigenous peoples
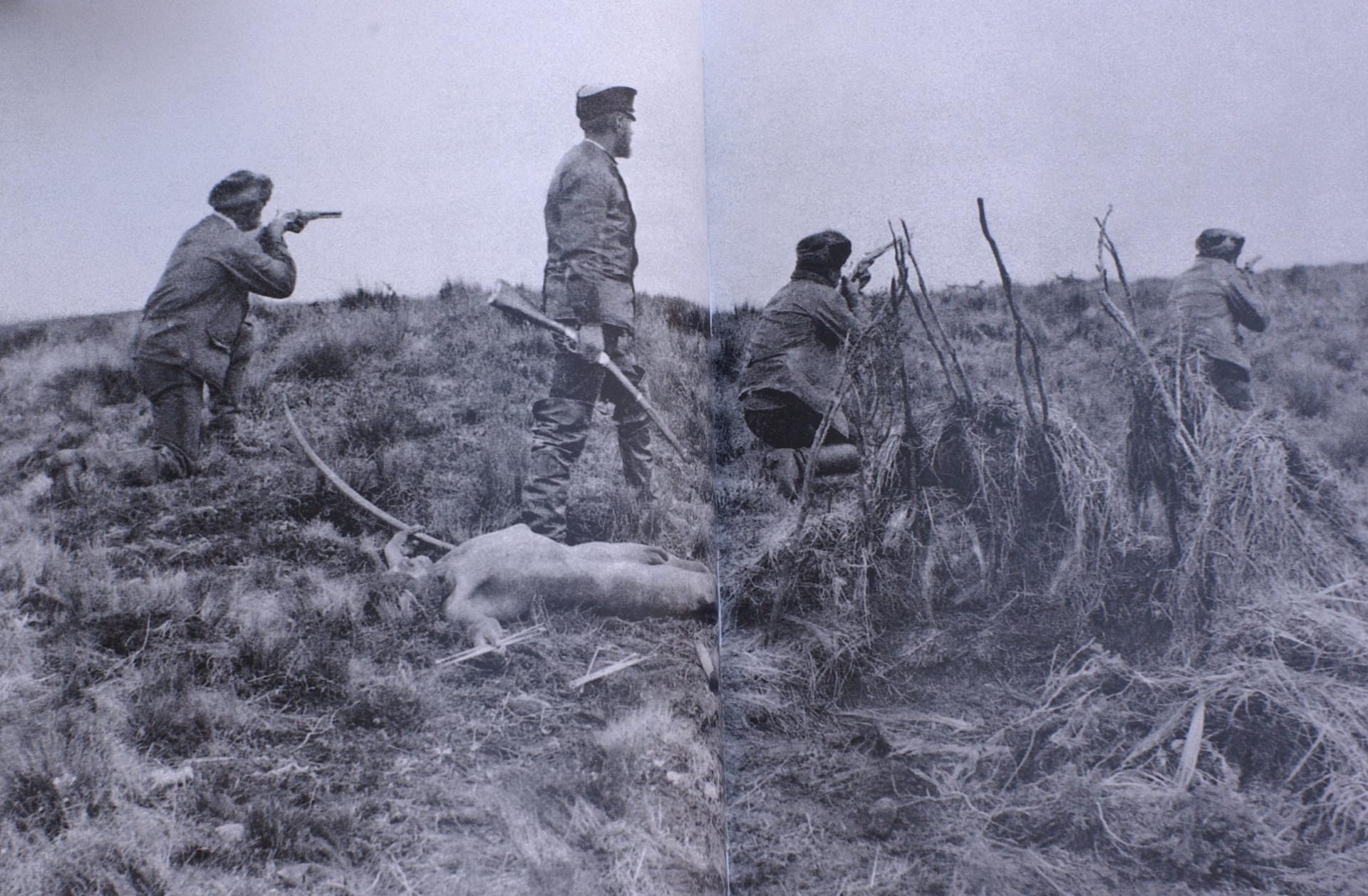
- Julius Popper and his men standing next to an unclothed dead Selkʼnam (1886)
- Location: Tierra del Fuego, Argentina and Chile
- Date: Late 19th to early 20th century
- Attack type: Genocidal massacre, internment, bounty killings
- Deaths: Unknown; population decline from c. 4,000 around 1850 to c. 100 in 1930
- Victim: Selkʼnam tribe
- Perpetrators: European and South American settlers and mercenaries
- Motive: Settler colonialism

The Selkʼnam genocide was the systematic extermination of the Selkʼnam people, one of the four indigenous peoples of Tierra del Fuego archipelago, in the late 19th and early 20th centuries. Historians estimate that the genocide spanned a period of between ten and twenty years, and resulted in the decline of the Selkʼnam population from approximately 4,000 people during the 1880s to a few hundred by the early 1900s.

During the late 19th century, European and South American livestock companies affiliated with the Chilean and Argentinian governments began to establish estancias (large ranches) on the Isla Grande de Tierra del Fuego, which along with the Tierra del Fuego gold rush displaced the indigenous population and heavily disrupted their traditional way of life. In response to violence between non-indigenous settlers and indigenous people, a campaign was conducted by European and South American hunters, ranchers, gold miners and soldiers to exterminate the Selkʼnam.

Livestock companies paid their employees and third-party hunters such as Julius Popper to kill or capture Selkʼnam people. The Chilean and Argentine militaries were also involved in the genocide, carrying out attacks on the Selkʼnam during exploratory voyages. Selkʼnam people living on the northern part of the island were the first to be affected by this violence, which prompted them to migrate southwards towards forested areas of the island unsuitable for livestock grazing. Eventually, the Chilean and Argentine governments issued land grants to the Salesians of Don Bosco, allowing them to establish several Christian missions aimed to save the remaining Selkʼnam, who were deported to Dawson Island. By 1930, only 100 Selkʼnam were still alive.

== Background ==
The Selkʼnam people are one of three indigenous peoples who inhabited the northeastern part of the archipelago, with a population before the genocide estimated at between 3,000 and 4,000. They were known as the "Ona" (people of the north), by the Yahgan people. The Selkʼnam had lived a semi-nomadic life of hunting and gathering in Isla Grande de Tierra del Fuego for thousands of years. The name of the island means "big island of Land of Fire", which is the name the early Spanish explorers gave it as they saw the smoke from Selkʼnam bonfires. They lived in the northeast, with the Haush people to their east on the Mitre Peninsula, and the Yahgan people to the west and south, in the central part of the main island and throughout the southern islands of the archipelago. According to one study, the Selkʼnam were divided into the following groups:

- Parika (located in the Northern Pampas).
- Herska (located in the southern forests)
- Chonkoyuka (located in the mountains in front of Inútil Bay), alongside the Haush.

The Selkʼnam were one of the last indigenous groups in South America to make contact with Europeans. German anthropologist Robert Lehmann-Nitsche published the first scholarly studies of the Selkʼnam, although he was later criticized for having studied members of the Selkʼnam people who had been abducted and exhibited in circuses in conditions of de facto slavery. Two Selkʼnam families were even exhibited at the 1889 Paris Exposition.

=== Population decline ===
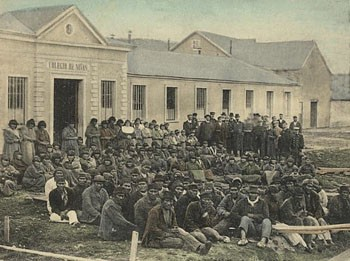
Selkʼnam after internment in Puerto Harris, Dawson Island, in 1896.

There are difficulties in obtaining reasonable estimates of the population of the three Selkʼnam groups, due to the lack of demographic studies prior to colonization. However, anthropologist Martin Gusinde estimated the population to be between 3,500 and 4,000. In 1887, El Boletín Salesiano estimated there to be 2,000 natives and later Father Borgatello estimated there to be between 2,000 and 3,000 souls. In the memoir of the Governor of Magallanes Manuel Señoret (1892–1897), he stated that:

When Tierra del Fuego was barely known, it was believed that the number of Ona Indians was very small. Now that numerous ranches have been founded and are crossed day by day by the employees of those ranches, it has been seen that their number is much greater. It is estimated, being a very exact and approximate calculation, that there are no less than four thousand indigenous people of the Ona race on the large island of Tierra del Fuego.

— Manuel Señoret Astaburuaga, Governor of the Magallanes between 1892 and 1897.

Alejandro Cañas estimated that in 1896 there was a population of 3,000 Selkʼnam.

A more reliable demographic study was made by Esteban Lucas Bridges in 1899, where he reported on the Selkʼnam in the following manner:

To the south of Río Grande live 250 Onas residing in various parts of the island; in the north, not including the misión de la Candelaria, live some 20 more Indians. In the same year, under the control of the missions, there were 163 Indians in Candelaria (according to the diaries of the mission) and at most 350 in Dawson. That is to say, that at the end of the 19th century, there were about 783 Onas left in Tierra del Fuego.

— Esteban Lucas Bridges (in 1899)

These figures show that the population could have been quite close to Martín Gusinde's estimates of 3,500 to 4,000 on the whole island. There is little clarity on how many indigenous people died in the 18 years before the beginning of colonization and the associated murder, disease, and deportations. For example, in an episode in the expedition of Ramón Lista, there was a confrontation in which 28 people were killed.

Martín Gusinde, an Austrian priest and ethnologist who studied them in the early 20th century, wrote in 1919 that only 279 Selkʼnam remained. In 1945 the Salesian missionary, Lorenzo Massa, counted 25.

By the early 1900s there may have been as little as 500 Selkʼnam in Tierra del Fuego. In 1916 Charles W. Furlong estimated there were about 800 Selkʼnam living in Tierra del Fuego; with Walter Gardini stating that by 1919 there were 279, and by 1930 just over 100.

The direct killing and extermination killed between 2,500 and 4,000 individuals, around 84% of the population. With Clara García-Moro calculating that by 1919 a total of 93% of the pre-contact Selkʼnam population had died.

=== Gold rush ===
The Chilean expedition of Ramón Serrano Montaner in 1879 reported the presence of significant gold deposits in the sands of the main rivers of Tierra del Fuego. Hundreds of foreign adventurers came to the island in search of fortune. However, resources of the metal depleted rapidly. Though gold miners did play a role in the violence against the Selkʼnam, the majority of attacks as part of the genocide were committed by South American and European ranchers and hunters, with the collaboration of Argentinean and Chilean governments and the Salesian missionaries.

== Extermination ==
The large ranchers tried to drive out the Selkʼnam, then began a campaign of extermination against them, with the complicity of the Argentine and Chilean governments. Large companies paid sheep farmers or militia a bounty for each Selkʼnam dead, which was confirmed by the presentation of a pair of hands or ears, or later a complete skull. They were given more for the death of a woman than a man. In addition, missionaries disrupted their livelihood through forcible relocation, and inadvertently brought with them deadly epidemics.

Ranching became the center of controversy in the Magellanic colony. The Selkʼnam were plied with alcohol, deported, raped, and murdered, with bounties paid to the most ruthless hunters. Martin Gusinde, an Austrian priest and ethnologist, who studied the Selkʼnam in the early 20th century, and visited the island towards the end of 1918, recounted in his writings that the hunters sent the skulls of the murdered Selkʼnam to foreign anthropological museums, actions undertaken "in the name of science." The colonial authorities were aware of the indigenous group's plight, but sided with the ranchers' cause over the Selkʼnam's, who were excluded from their worldview which was based on concepts of "progress" and "civilization." Ranchers typically exercised their own judgement, including the financing of violent campaigns. Considerable numbers of foreign men were hired and quantities of arms were imported for these campaigns to eliminate the Selkʼnam, who were perceived as a major obstacle to the success of colonists' investments. Farm employees later confirmed the routine nature of such campaigns.

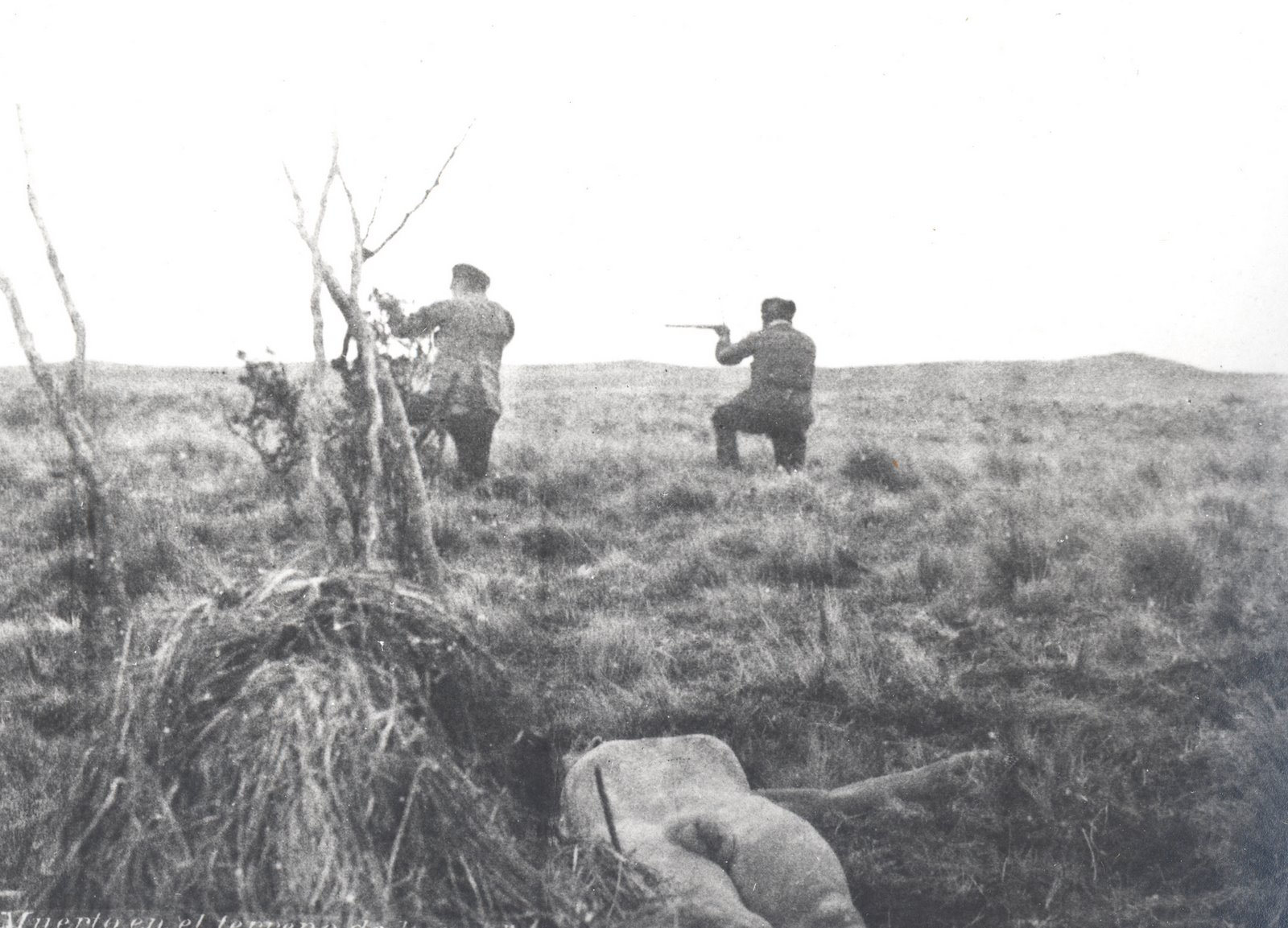
Julius Popper (on left) shooting, with a Selkʼnam corpse visible in the foreground

Little is known of those responsible for these actions; they included many ranch owners, who were the direct superiors of the employees that participated in the ventures. Among those who hunted the indigenous people were Julius Popper, Ramón Lista, Alexander McLennan, a "Mister Bond", Alexander A. Cameron, Samuel Hyslop, John McRae, and Montt E. Wales.

Prominent landowners with responsibility included Mauricio (Moritz) Braun (brother of businesswoman Sara Braun), who acknowledged having financed some campaigns, justifying them as only intending to protect his investments (he was the employer of another known exterminator, Alexander A. Cameron); and José Menéndez, the father-in-law of Mauricio Braun, known for acting with the most severity against the Selkʼnam in the Argentine territory of Tierra del Fuego. The owner of two cattle ranches that occupied more than 200,000 ha (490,000 acres) in the center of Selkʼnam territory, Menéndez was the boss of Alexander MacLennan. MacLennan, a Scotsman known as "Chancho Colorado" ("The Red Pig"), became notorious for his brutal treatment of indigenous people, participated in the massacre at Cabo Peñas, where 17 indigenous people died. When he retired after 12 years of service, Menéndez gave MacLennan a valuable gold watch in recognition of his service.

The shareholders of the Company for the Exploitation of Tierra de Fuego (Spanish: Sociedad Explotadora de Tierra del Fuego) strove to hide their actions towards native tribes from the public. This was both a means for the company to avoid questioning and a strategy to lower its controversial profile. Special attention was paid to these events after the intervention of the Salesian missionaries, who condemned the actions of the ranchers while themselves contributing in more subtle ways to the extermination of native cultures. Beginning in the 1890s, the situation of the Selkʼnam became severe. As the territories of the north began to be largely occupied by farms and ranches, many indigenous people, besieged by hunger and persecuted by European and South American colonists, started to flee towards the extreme south of the island. This region was already inhabited by indigenous groups who had a strong sense of ownership over the land. Consequently, the fights for control of territory intensified. The predicament of the Selkʼnam worsened with the establishment of religious missions, which introduced lethal illnesses to the vulnerable population.

As part of the campaign of extermination, the Fuegian dog was hunted to extinction due to its use in hunting and homemaking among the Selkʼnam.

Later conflicts between governor Señoret and the head of the Salesian mission José Fagnano only served to worsen, rather than improve, conditions for the Selkʼnam. Long disputes between civil authorities and priests did not produce a satisfactory solution to the "indigenous issue". Governor Señoret favored the ranchers' cause and took little interest in the incidents that took place in Tierra del Fuego.

Two Christian missions were established to preach to the Selkʼnam. They were intended to provide housing and food for the natives, but closed due to the small number of Selkʼnam remaining; they had numbered in the thousands before Western colonization, but by the early twentieth century only a few hundred remained.

Repression against the Selkʼnam persisted into the early twentieth century. Chile moved most of the Selkʼnam in their territory to Dawson Island in the mid-1890s, confining them to a Salesian mission. Argentina finally allowed Salesian missionaries to aid the Selkʼnam and attempt to assimilate them, with their traditional culture and livelihoods then completely interrupted. About 4,000 Selkʼnam were alive in the mid-nineteenth century; by 1930 this had been reduced to about 100. With the assimilation of many groups who later became Argentinians and Chileans, Selkʼnam territory was conquered and the Selkʼnam culture was effectively exterminated. The last full-blooded Selkʼnam, Ángela Loij, died in 1974. According to the 2010 United Nations Educational, Scientific and Cultural Organization (UNESCO) Atlas of the World's Languages in Danger, the Selkʼnam language, believed to be part of the Chonan language family, is extinct, as the last speakers died in the 1980s.

== Assimilation and adoption ==
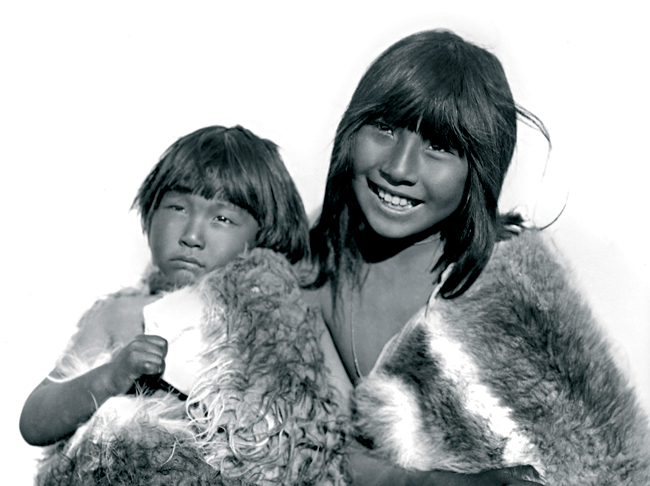
Selkʼnam children, 1898

Beyond the spread of disease, massacres, and the campaign of extermination, another tool in the genocide was the forcible adoption and assimilation of Selkʼnam children into European families. This included many "irregular" adoptions, of which there are no formal records, so the connection to a Selkʼnam identity was completely lost.

== Genocide trial ==
Years later, justice for the conflict was sought through an inquiry (1895–1904) by Judge Waldo Seguel. This process confirmed that the indigenous people of Tierra del Fuego had indeed been hunted. Indigenous people were captured and removed en masse, transferred to Punta Arenas, and distributed throughout the colony. It was judged that these acts were proposed by ranchers and carried out with the complicity of civil authorities, who regarded the genocide as a solution to the "indigenous issue".

However, the judicial process ruled that only a few farmworkers were at fault, and these were released just a few months after the trial. The perpetrators of the expeditions, such as owners and stakeholders of farms belonging to Mauricio Braun, José Menéndez, Rodolfo Stubenrauch, and Peter H. MacClelland, were never prosecuted. Even official figures and civil servants, like governor Señoret and José Contardi, who theoretically had the greatest responsibility to guard the sanctity of the law, were never investigated. The book "Harassment Inflicted on the Indigenous People of Tierra de la Fuego" ("Vejámenes inferidos a los indígenas de Tierra del Fuego") by author Carlos Vega Delgado shows that Judge Waldo Seguel covered for ranchers who committed acts of genocide. The judge falsely recorded that he could not obtain a statement from the Selkʼnam individuals who witnessed the genocide because there were no interpreters between the two languages. However, such translators did exist, including various priests of the Salesian mission and sisters of María Auxiliadora who had learned the native dialect in the missions, as well as Spanish-speaking Selkʼnam, like Tenenésk, Covadonga Ona, and even a deacon of the church.

== In films ==
- Tierra del fuego (2000), directed by Miguel Littin
- White on White (2019), directed by Théo Court
- The Settlers (2023), directed by Felipe Gálvez

== See also ==
- Fuegians
- Kawésqar
- Patagonia Rebelde

== Bibliography ==
- Adelaar, Willem (2010). "South America". In Moseley, Christopher (ed.). Atlas of the World's Languages in Danger (3rd Revised ed.). UNESCO. pp. 86–94. ISBN 978-9231040962.
- Azócar-Avendaño, Alonso; Nitrihual-Valdebenito, Luis; Flores-Chávez, Jaime (2012). "La Patagonia en postales fotográficas: Misioneros salesianos y construcción de imaginarios sobre selkʼnam, kaweskar y yámanas entre 1880 y 1920" [Patagonia in photographic postcards: Salesian missionaries and construction of Selkʼnam, Kaweskar, and Yámana imagery between 1880 and 1920]. Arte, Individuo y Sociedad (in Spanish). 25 (2): 271–288. doi:10.5209/rev_ARIS.2013.v25.n2.39040. ISSN 1131-5598.
- Casali, Romina (2008). "Contacto Interétnico en el Norte de Tierra de Fuego: Primera Aproximación a Las Estrategias de Resistencia Selkʼnam" [Interethnic Contact in the North of Tierra del Fuego: First Approach to Selkʼnam Resistance Strategies]. Magallania (in Spanish). 36 (2): 45–61. doi:10.4067/S0718-22442008000200003.
- Chapman, Anne (2010). European Encounters with the Yamana People of Cape Horn, Before and After Darwin (1st ed.). Cambridge University Press. ISBN 978-0521513791.
- Furlong, Charles W. (March 1917). "Tribal Distribution and Settlements of the Fuegians, Comprising Nomenclature, Etymology, Philology, and Populations". Geographical Review. 3 (3). Taylor & Francis: 169–187. Bibcode:1917GeoRv...3..169F. doi:10.2307/207659. JSTOR 207659.
- Gigoux, Carlos (2022). ""Condemned to Disappear": Indigenous Genocide in Tierra del Fuego" (PDF). Journal of Genocide Research. 24 (1): 1–22. doi:10.1080/14623528.2020.1853359. Archived from the original (PDF) on 3 June 2024.
- Gilbert, Jérémie (2014). Nomadic Peoples and Human Rights. Routledge. p. 23. ISBN 978-0415526968.
- Harambour, Alberto (2019a). "'There Cannot be Civilisation and Barbarism on the Island': Civilian-driven Violence and the Genocide of the Selkʼnam People of Tierra del Fuego". In Adhikari, Mohamed (ed.). Civilian-Driven Violence and the Genocide of Indigenous Peoples in Settler Societies. Routledge. pp. 165–187. doi:10.4324/9781003015550-7. ISBN 9781003015550. Archived from the original on 21 November 2023.
- Lastra-Bravo, Javier (2021). "The resurgence of the Selkʼnam. Dynamics of ethnoheterogenesis, ethnicity, and legal recognition in the Tierra del Fuego". Runas: Journal of Education & Culture. 2 (4) e21038. doi:10.46652/runas.v2i4.38. ISSN 2737-6230.
- Lothrop, Samuel Kirkland (1928). The Indians of Tierra del Feugo. Contributions from the Museum of the American Indian. Vol. X. Museum of the American Indian, Heye Foundation.
- Olivares, Fernanda; Schattke, Constanze; Molina, Hemaʼny; Berner, Margit; Eggers, Sabine (2023). "Re-telling the story of Selkʼnam ancestors: From Karokynká/Tierra del Fuego to Austria". Human Remains and Violence. 9 (1): 49–69. doi:10.7227/HRV.9.1.4.
- Prieto, Alfredo (2007). "The Struggle for Social Life in Fuego Patagonia". In Chacon, Edward (ed.). Latin American Indigenous Warfare and Ritual Violence. University of Arizona Press. ISBN 978-0816525270.
- Ray, Leslie (2007). Language of the Land: The Mapuche in Argentina and Chile. Copenhagen: IWGIA (International Work Group for Indigenous Affairs). ISBN 978-879156337-9 – via Google Books.
- Spears, John (1895). The Gold Diggings of Cape Horn: A study of Life in Tierra del Fuego and Patagonia. New York. ISBN 9-7805-4834-724-9.
