= Sociedad Explotadora de Tierra del Fuego =

Dissolved Chilean company

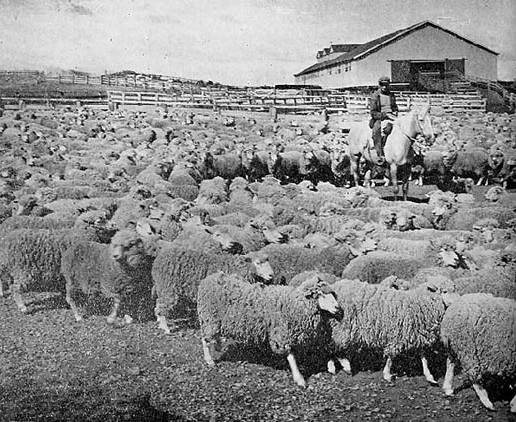
Sheep roundup for the processing and freezing SETF factory

The Sociedad Explotadora de Tierra del Fuego (SETF; Spanish: Company for the Exploitation of Tierra del Fuego) was a historically important company operating within the Chilean and Argentine region of Patagonia. It was founded in 1893 and cultivated over 1,000,000 ha (2,500,000 acres) land for sheep farming and private factories like Puerto Bories to process, freeze and export sheep meat.

== History ==
In 1881, the Treaty of Boundaries was negotiated between Argentina and Chile to settle the overlapping boundary dispute concerning Patagonia, which had occurred when each country gained their independence from Spain. By 1886, José Nogueira, a Portuguese shipping magnate, had begun to plan a ranching enterprise for the area. He leased 180,000 ha (440,000 acres) of Fuegian land in April 1889 and in November, his brother-in-law, Mauricio Braun acting as Nogueira's agent, leased an additional 170,000 ha (420,000 acres) of land. In 1890, Nogueira and his wife, Sara Braun, secured a lease from President José Manuel Balmaceda's administration on a third of the available land in Tierra del Fuego, containing 1,009,000 ha (2,490,000 acres). A condition of the last lease was that Nogueira establish a Chilean business to manage the land. As he was Portuguese and his wife was Latvian, Nogueira made a deal with Ramón Serrano Montaner to sell him a third of the lease, at cost, in exchange for Serrano's recruitment of Chilean investors. Before they were able to finalize the organization of the business, Nogueira died, leaving his vast estate to his wife.

Upon her husband's death, Braun contacted her brother Mauricio to determine what to do about the lease assignment of Serrano. The siblings agreed that Serrano's involvement complicated the business venture and after a lengthy negotiation, Braun was able to secure Serrano's exchange of his lease rights for 100 shares in the business. On 31 August 1893, the Sociedad Explotadora de Tierra del Fuego (Society for the Exploitation of Tierra del Fuego) was founded by the Braun siblings with the major shareholders being Sara Braun; her brother Mauricio and other family members; Juan Blanchard, a partner in the firm Braun & Blanchard; and Peter H. McClelland, the head of the firm Duncan, Fox & Co Ltd. This group controlled slightly less than a half of the shares, to meet the requirement that the business venture have a majority of Chilean participants. Among the remaining shareholders were Serrano, Juan and Gustavo Oehninger, Cruz Daniel Ramírez, and Guillermo Wilms, who each owned 100 shares of the stock and various minor shareholders from Magallanes and Valparaíso.

Initially the company was involved in sheep raising and land speculation, but as their desire to obtain additional land in Argentine Patagonia grew they recruited José Menéndez and his son-in-law, Francisco Campos Torreblanca to join in the venture. Initially the Braun and Menéndez families were business rivals, but in 1895, Menéndez became Mauricio's father-in-law when Braun married Menéndez's daughter, Josefina. While the investors varied over time, until her death Sara Nogueira Braun remained the largest individual shareholder in the association.

While the business acquisitions created an oligarchical group which controlled production and development of southern Chile, it also displaced the original inhabitants of those lands. Fences created obstacles for the nomadic life of the Selkʼnam people and introduction of sheep herds displaced their main food source, the guanaco. Facing starvation and with no concept of ownership, they began to steal livestock. The Exploitation Society asked and received permission from the Chilean government to remove the indigenous population from the area. Menéndez gave orders for the extermination of the Selkʼnam, paying a bounty for each death. Repression against the Selkʼnam, who now numbered only roughly a hundred, continued after the genocide. Chile moved the remaining Selkʼnam people to Dawson Island, where they were placed in concentration camps. Argentina eventually allowed Salesian missionaries to aid the Selkʼnam and attempt to culturally assimilate them, with their traditional culture and livelihoods at this point completely destroyed.

Under agrarian reforms in the 1960s, the society changed its name in 1964 to Ganadera Tierra del Fuego S.A. and was dissolved officially in 1973.
