= Charles W. Furlong =

American artist, writer and explorer (1874–1967)

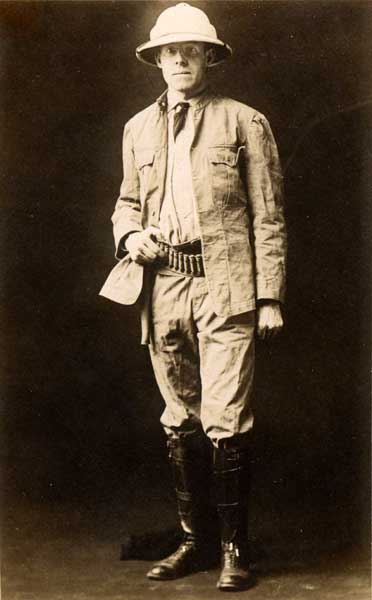
- Born: 1874; Cambridge, Massachusetts
- Died: 1967 (aged 92–93)
- Occupation: Explorer

Charles Wellington Furlong (1874–1967) was an American explorer, writer, artist and photographer from Massachusetts.

== Life ==
Furlong was born in Cambridge, Massachusetts in 1874. He graduated from Massachusetts Normal Art School in 1895. From 1901 to 1902, he was a student at Cornell, Harvard, Ecole des Beaux Arts, Paris. He was the head of the Art Department at Cornell from 1896 to 1904.

He was in North Africa, 1904–1905; Tierra del Fuego, 1907–1908; and Venezuela, 1910. In 1915 he was a member of an expedition to the West African islands for the Harvard Museum of Comparative Zoology (the Kitty A expedition).

He was the first American to explore the Tripolitan Sahara. This experience led to his writing of The Gateway to the Sahara in 1909. Harper's magazine funded him on a trip to South America around 1909. His article "The Southernmost people of the world" came out of this trip. Even after the article was written he continued to travel and explore in South America.

His world travels led to a decline in his overall health, in order to get better he traveled to the American West as Theodore Roosevelt had done for his health earlier.

In 1914, he became a member of the U.S. Army until the end of World War I in 1918. After the war, he was a Member of the American Peace delegation in Paris, France for a year. Then in 1919 he was appointed as the Special Military aide to President Woodrow Wilson for a brief time before he was reappointed as a Military observer, intelligence officer in the Balkans, Near East and Middle East. His association with the U.S. military was not a brief affair. He served as a Reserve officer for 34 years, attaining the rank of colonel. His knowledge of the Middle East was valuable during World War II.

In 1925, he helped establish a voting system in Tacona, Africa, personally designing ballots and setting up polling places in remote areas. While traveling the world he continued to write and create a variety of types and kinds of art, along with his work as a diplomat and military delegate.

He died in 1967, leaving behind two children.

== Works ==
=== Books ===
- — (1921). Let 'Er Buck, A Story Of The Passing Of The Old West. New York: G. P. Putnam's Sons.
- — (1909). The Gateway To The Sahara: Observations And Experiences In Tripoli. New York: Charles Scribner's Sons.
- Tripoli in Barbary(1911)
- The vanishing people of the Land of Fire
- The southernmost people of the world

=== Articles ===
- — (September 1906). "Salam: The Story Of A Hausa Slave". Appleton's Magazine. VIII (3): 259–268.
- — (April 1911). "Cruising With The Yahgans". The Outing Magazine. LVIII (1): 3–17.
- — (October 1911). "The Toll Of The Straits: Stories of Storms, Wrecks, And Castaway Crews In The Fuegian Archipelago And The Patagonian Channels". The Outing Magazine. LIX (1): 3–22.
- — (July 1911). "Tripoli In Barbary: Including An Insight Into North Africa And The Sahara And A Brief Comment On The French Scheme Of Empire In Africa". The Journal of Race Development. 2 (1): 18–44. doi:10.2307/29737893. JSTOR 29737893.
- — (October 1912). "Hunting The Guanaco: Including An Explorer's Observations Of This Southernmost Big Game Animal Of The World During Expeditions Through Tierra-Del-Fuego And Patagonia". The Outing Magazine. LXI (1): 3–20.
- — (1914). "Turcos And The Legion: The Spahis, The Zouaves, The Tirailleurs, And The Foreign Legion". The World's Work, Second War Manual: The Conduct of the War: 35–37.
- — (December 1915). "The Haush And Ona, Primitive Tribes Of Tierra Del Fuego". Proceedings of the Nineteenth International Congress of Americanists: 432–444.
- — (December 1915). "The Alaculoofs And Yahgans, The World's Southernmost Inhabitants". Proceedings of the Nineteenth International Congress of Americanists: 420–431.
- — (August 1916). "The Epic Drama Of The West". Harper's Monthly Magazine. CXXXIII (795): 368–.
- — (October 1917). "The French As Colonizers: North Africa The Field Of Their Most Successful Work - How They Have Civilized People And Enriched The Land While Building For Themselves A Commercial Empire". The World's Work. XXXIV (6): 668–682.

• -- (August, 1918) "Climbing the Shoulders of Atlas," Harper's Monthly Magazine 819 (1918): 420–434.

== Artworks ==
https://americanart.si.edu/search/artworks?content_type=artwork&persons[]=2917
