= Puerto Bories =

Town in Última Esperanza, Chile

Coordinates: 51.69267°S 72.53406°W

Puerto Bories, about 5 km from downtown Puerto Natales, was a small "company town" whose focus was a "frigorifico"—a sheep meat and wool processing plant belonging to the Sociedad Explotadora de Tierra del Fuego. In addition to the plant complex, the private town eventually included a radio station, swimming pool, small dairy, recreational facilities, a police outpost, and housing for high-level company employees such as managers, engineers, and accountants. After most commercial activity at the freezer complex ceased during the 1990s, a tax auction was held and several mostly small private parcels were created and sold. Puerto Bories is somewhat unusual in that it retains a great deal of its "private town" nature, as even the town plaza and roads belong to property-owning members of the small community. As of the year 2012, Puerto Bories has featured three hotels and some minor commercial activities.

Pioneers arrived from Europe in the late 19th century to the Last Hope Province, giving life to a thriving industry based on sheep farming. Such development resulted in the construction of the Bories Cold-Storage Plant in 1915 was processed, frozen, and further exported as meat and wool to the European markets.

This industrial plant was fully operational for almost sixty years, generating employment and contributing to the population growth in Patagonia, and largely responsible for the foundation of Puerto Natales in 1911. This of course does not make sense because the Bories plant was not operational until several years after 1911.

This [sheep] industry was autonomous thanks to its operational departments and "estancias". At full capacity the plant worked an average of 150.000 and 250.000 sheep per year, employing 100 permanent staff during the entire year and reaching 400 workers during periods of higher production (January to April).

The Cold Storage Plant was constructed in "Post Victorian Industrial" architectural style and features several examples of British machinery, reflecting the technology of the early 20th century. The frigorifico complex presents is part of the industrial history of the Puerto Natales area. In 2010 the frigorific was restored into hotel The Singular Patagonia.

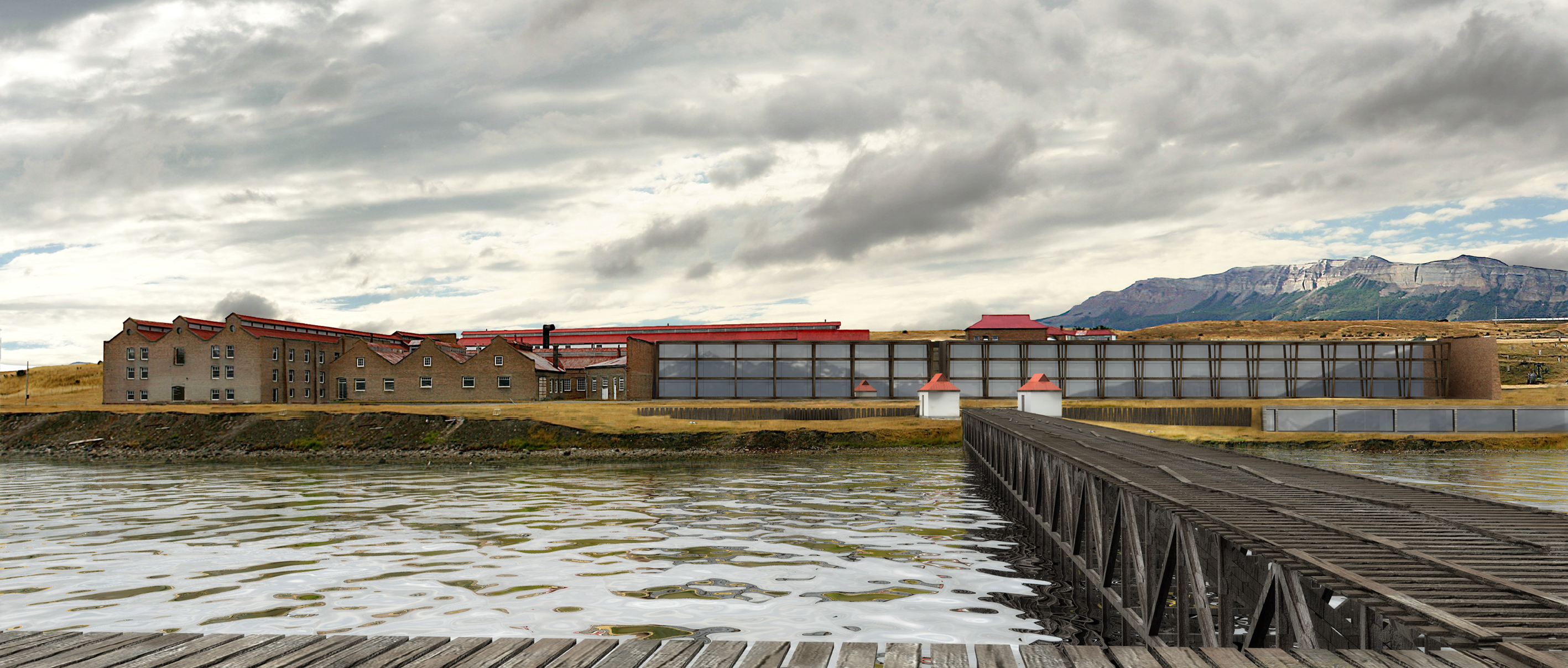
Puerto Bories (2010)
