= Quiddity Films =

British independent production company

- Founded: 2016
- Founder: Emily Morgan
- Headquarters: London, England
- Website: www.quiddityfilms.com

Quiddity Films is a British independent production company founded and run by BAFTA and BIFA–winning producer Emily Morgan. Established in London, the company produces a diverse slate of feature films and series in collaboration with international partners across Europe, Africa, and Latin America.

== History ==
Quiddity Films was founded in 2016 by Emily Morgan, a NFTS graduate, following her work in distribution and freelance production. Early support came via a BFI Vision Award. Morgan earned the BAFTA Award for Outstanding Debut in 2018 for I Am Not a Witch, directed by Rungano Nyoni, and received a British Independent Film Award for Breakthrough Producer the year prior.

Quiddity was selected as one of the UK's top emerging production companies in Screen Daily's Brit50 list. It also received funding from the UK Global Screen Fund and the BBC Small Indie Fund.

=== Corporate developments ===
In 2024, Quiddity secured a strategic investment from The Lift, a Mexico-based production services company. The deal expanded Quiddity's development capacity and enhanced cross-continental collaboration initiatives. It also strengthened its leadership team by hiring Filiz‑Theres Erel as Head of Production, and Alex Hitch as Head of Development.

== Filmography ==
Year	Film	Role	Notes
2017	I Am Not a Witch	Producer	Debut feature; Cannes Directors’ Fortnight; BAFTA Award winner
2019	Make Up	Producer	Multiple festival screenings, critical acclaim
2020	Supernova	Producer	Multiple festival screenings, critical acclaim
2023	The Settlers	Producer	Premiered at Cannes Un Certain Regard; official Chilean entry for 2024 Academy Awards
2024	Swimming Home	Producer	
2025	Dreamers	Producer	Supported by BBC Film
