= Jessie Chisi =

Zambian director and filmmaker

- Education: Durban Talent Campus; Berlinale Talent Campus
- Occupations: Film director, screenwriter
- Known for: Remedy, Zuba, Imagination, Zambia's Boxing Star, Between Rings

Jessie Chisi is a Zambian film director and screenwriter.

== Life ==
Growing up in Zambia, Chisi attended the Durban Talent Campus in 2009 and in 2010 was accepted at the Berlinale Talent Campus. She was production assistant on Rungano Nyoni's 2011 short film Mwansa the Great.

In 2013 Chisi established the Zambia Short Film Fest, show-casing short films of 15 minutes or less.

Chisi's Berlinale pitch, then called Woman On Hold, eventually became her 2014 film Between Rings, funded by the Finnish Film Foundation. The story concerns Chisi's cousin Esther Phiri, Zambia's first female boxer, who was torn between marriage and career. It screened at the Copenhagen International Documentary Festival.

She wrote, co-produced and co-directed Imagination (2016), about a young boy in Garden Township, Lusaka who dreams against the odds of becoming a filmmaker. She directed Season 1 & 2 of Zuba (2018-2019), Zambia's first telenovela. In 2020, she produced, directed and wrote Remedy, a short film centered around the Zambian experience of the COVID-19 pandemic. Her 2021 short film Extracted: The People vs. Vedanta exposed the long standing environmental pollution and destruction of livelihood that copper mining brought to the communities of Shimulala village in Zambia's Copperbelt. She helped to bring the issue to light. In 2022, she participated in the documentary series Year Zero as a director, together with 13 other filmmakers. The series premiered at Tribeca Festival in New York.

Chisi divides her time between Zambia and Switzerland. She has also lived and worked in Finland.

== Filmography ==
- (directed and wrote) Zambian chapter of Year Zero, 2022. Docuseries.
- (directed and wrote) Extracted: The People vs. Vedanta, 2021. Documentary.
- (directed and wrote) Remedy, 2020.
- (directed) Zuba Season 1 & 2, 2018–2019. TV series.
- (wrote, co-produced and co-directed with Vatice Mushauko) Imagination, 2016.
- (directed) Zambia's Boxing Star, 2016. TV movie documentary.
- (co-directed with Salla Sorri) Between Rings: The Esther Phiri Story, 2014. Documentary.
