= Becky Ngoma =

Zambian actress and writer

- Born: Lusaka, Zambia
- Education: Zambia Institute of Mass Communication
- Occupation(s): Actor, writer, director, producer
- Years active: 1990–present
- Notable work: Mwansa the Great
- Awards: 2014 Zambia Film, Television and Radio Awards

Becky Ngoma, is a Zambian actress and writer. A filmmaker, Mwape started his career as an actor and is best known for the roles in Mwansa the Great, I Am Not a Witch and Temzu Town. Apart from acting, she is also a director and producer.

== Personal life ==
She was born in Lusaka, Zambia. She is a graduate of TV production at Zambia Institute of Mass Communication (ZAMCOM).

== Career ==
She worked as an actress and writer in several television series' such as, Kabanana, Zambia's first soapie and Love Games and Fever as well as in films, Suwi and Mwansa the Great. Meanwhile, worked on the set of popular South African soap opera, Generations. She is also the writer for popular television series Zuba, the Zambia's first telenovela, which airs on Zambezi Magic. She also acted in the critically acclaim film I Am Not a Witch which became a BAFTA winning movie with the role 'Bwalya'.

She has won several awards for her creative script-writing such as; 2014 Zambia Film, Television and Radio Awards (Zafta) Award for best screenwriter, 2016 Zafta Award for Best television series, and 2018 Zambian women awards for Woman of The Year.

== Filmography ==
Year	Film	Role	Genre	Ref.
2011	Mwansa the Great	Actor: Mother, costumer	Short film	
2017	I Am Not A Witch	Actor: Bwalya	Film	
TBD	Temzu Town	writer	TV Mini-Series	
