= 2023 Stockholm International Film Festival =

Film festival in Stockholm, Sweden

- Official poster
- Opening film: Poor Things by Yorgos Lanthimos
- Location: Stockholm, Sweden
- Founded: 1990
- Awards: Bronze Horse (The Settlers by Felipe Gálvez Haberle)
- No. of films: 130 from 50 countries
- Festival date: 8–19 November 2023
- Website: stockholmfilmfestival.se/en

Stockholm International Film Festival
- 2024 2022

The 34th Stockholm International Film Festival took place on 8 to 19 November 2023 in Stockholm, Sweden.

The festival was opened with science fantasy film Poor Things, directed by Yorgos Lanthimos, which won the Audience Award. Chilean drama film The Settlers won the most prestigious award of the festival, Bronze Horse.

== Official Selection ==
=== Opening film ===
English title	Original title	Director(s)	Production country
Poor Things		Yorgos Lanthimos	Ireland, United Kingdom, United States

=== Stockholm Competition ===
The following films were selected for the main international competition:

English title	Original title	Director(s)	Production country
Animalia	Parmi nous	Sofia Alaoui	Morocco, Qatar, France
The Breaking Ice	燃冬	Anthony Chen	China, Singapore
Dream Scenario		Kristoffer Borgli	United States
The Enchanted	Els encantats	Elena Trapé	Spain
Grace	Blazh	Ilya Povolotsky	Russia
Hesitation Wound	Tereddüt çİzgİsİ	Selman Nacar	Turkey, France, Spain, Romania
Hounds	Les meutes	Kamal Lazraq	Morocco, Qatar, France, Belgium, Saudi Arabia
How to Have Sex		Molly Manning Walker	United Kingdom, Greece
Let Me Go	Laissez-moi	Maxime Rappaz	France, Belgium, Switzerland
The Nature of Love	Simple comme Sylvain	Monia Chokri	France, Canada
Only the River Flows	河边的错误	Wei Shujun	China
The Pod Generation		Sophie Barthes	United Kingdom, France, Belgium
Reality		Tina Satter	United States
Rosalie		Stéphanie Di Giusto	France, Belgium
Scrapper		Charlotte Regan	United States
The Settlers	Los colonos	Felipe Gálvez Haberle	Sweden, France, Chile, Denmark, United Kingdom, Argentina, Germany, Taiwan
Slow		Marija Kavtaradzė	Lithuania, Sweden, Spain
Toll	Pedágio	Carolina Markowicz	Brazil, Portugal

Highlighted title indicates Bronze Horse winner.

=== Stockholm Documentary Competition ===
The following films were selected for the international documentary competition:

English title	Original title	Director(s)	Production country
20 Days in Mariupol		Mstyslav Chernov	Ukraine
The Arc of Oblivion		Ian Cheney	United States
Beyond Utopia		Madeleine Gavin	United States
Citizen Sleuth		Chris Kasick	United States
The Eternal Memory	La memoria infinita	Maite Alberdi	Chile
God Is a Woman	Dieu est une femme	Andres Peyrot	France, Switzerland, Panama
Hollywoodgate		Ibrahim Nash'at	United States, Germany
Megaheartz		Emily Norling	Sweden
On the Edge	État limite	Nicolas Peduzzi	France
Pictures of Ghosts	Retratos Fantasmas	Kleber Mendonça Filho	Brazil
Somliga går med trasiga skor		Magnus Gertten	Sweden, Denmark
Total Trust		Jialing Zhang	Germany, The Netherlands
Vista Mare		Julia Gutweniger, Florian Kofler	Austria, Italy

=== Discovery ===
English title	Original title	Director(s)	Production country
Almamula		Juan Sebastián Torales	France, Argentina, Italy
Amina		Ahmed Abdullahi	Sweden
Hello Dankness		Soda Jerk	Australia
I Used to Be Funny		Ally Pankiw	Canada
In Camera		Naqqash Khalid	United Kingdom
Inshallah a Boy		Amjad Al Rasheed	Jordan, Qatar, France, Saudi Arabia
The Persian Version		Maryam Keshavarz	United States
The Rapture	Le Ravissement	Iris Kaltenbäck	France
Shayda		Noora Niasari	Australia, United Kingdom
Sky Peals		Moin Hussain	United Kingdom
A Song Sung Blue	小白船	Zihan Geng	China
Stolen		Karan Tejpal	India

=== American Independents ===
Title	Director(s)	Production country
A Little Prayer	Angus MacLachlan	United States
Are You There God? It's Me, Margaret.	Kelly Fremon Craig	United States
Cora Bora	Hannah Pearl Utt	United States
Earth Mama	Savanah Leaf	United States, United Kingdom
Ex-Husbands	Noah Pritzker	United States
Priscilla	Sofia Coppola	United States, Italy
Riddle of Fire	Weston Razooli	United States
Rotting in the Sun	Sebastián Silva	United States, Mexico
Shortcomings	Randall Park	United States
Sometimes I Think About Dying	Rachel Lambert	United States
The Starling Girl	Laurel Parmet	United States
You Hurt My Feelings	Nicole Holofcener	United States

=== Icons ===
English title	Original title	Director(s)	Production country
All of Us Strangers		Andrew Haigh	United Kingdom, United States
Bad Behaviour		Alice Englert	New Zealand
The Beast	La Bête	Bertrand Bonello	France, Canada
Eileen		William Oldroyd	United Kingdom, United States
The Holdovers		Alexander Payne	United States
Inside		Vasilis Katsoupis	Belgium, Greece, Germany
Manodrome		John Trengove	United Kingdom, United States
The Royal Hotel		Kitty Green	Australia, United Kingdom
Saltburn		Emerald Fennell	United Kingdom
Wildcat		Ethan Hawke	United States

=== Masters ===
English title	Original title	Director(s)	Production country
The Book of Solutions	Le Livre des solutions	Michel Gondry	France
The Crime Is Mine	Mon crime	François Ozon	France
Homecoming	Le retour	Catherine Corsini	France
In Our Day	우리의 하루	Hong Sang-soo	South Korea
In Water	물안에서	Hong Sang-soo	South Korea
Io capitano		Matteo Garrone	Italy, France, Belgium
Last Summer	L'Été dernier	Catherine Breillat	France, Norway
Monster	怪物	Hirokazu Kore-eda	Japan
The Movie Teller	La contadora de películas	Lone Scherfig	France, Chile, Spain
Origin		Ava DuVernay	United States
Society of the Snow	La sociedad de la nieve	J. A. Bayona	Spain

=== Open Zone ===
English title	Original title	Director(s)	Production country
The Beast in the Jungle	La Bête dans la jungle	Patric Chiha	France, Belgium, Austria
The Castle	El castillo	Martín Benchimol	Argentina, France
Close Your Eyes	Cerrar los ojos	Víctor Erice	Spain, Argentina
The Delinquents	Los delincuentes	Rodrigo Moreno	Argentina, Brazil, Luxembourg, Chile
The Goldman Case	Le Procès Goldman	Cédric Kahn	France
Holly		Fien Troch	Belgium, Luxembourg, Netherlands
A Normal Family	보통의 가족	Hur Jin-ho	South Korea
The Old Oak		Ken Loach	United Kingdom, France, Belgium
The Practice	La práctica	Martín Rejtman	Chile, Argentina, Portugal
Someday We'll Tell Each Other Everything	Irgendwann werden wir uns alles erzählen	Emily Atef	Germany
Shame on Dry Land	Syndabocken	Axel Petersén	Sweden, Malta
The Teachers' Lounge	Das Lehrerzimmer	Ilker Çatak	Germany

=== Twilight Zone ===
English title	Original title	Director(s)	Production country
Birth/Rebirth		Laura Moss	United States
Booger		Mary Dauterman	United States
In Flames		Zarrar Kahn	Canada, Pakistan
Late Night with the Devil		Cameron Cairnes, Colin Cairnes	Australia, United Arab Emirates
The Lost Children	Les enfants perdus	Michèle Jacob	Belgium
Pensive	Rūpintojėlis	Jonas Trukanas	Lithuania
Satan Wants You		Steve J. Adams, Sean Horlor	Canada
Sleep	잠	Jason Yu	South Korea
Superposition		Karoline Lyngbye	Denmark

=== Special Presentations ===
English title	Original title	Director(s)	Production country
The Curse (episode 1)		Nathan Fielder, Benny Safdie	United States
Strange Way of Life	Extraña forma de vida	Pedro Almodóvar	Spain, France

== Awards ==
The following awards were presented during the 34th edition:

- Best Film (Bronze Horse): The Settlers by Felipe Gálvez Haberle
- Best Director: Molly Manning Walker for How to Have Sex
- Best Debut: How to Have Sex by Molly Manning Walker
- Best Screenplay: Kamal Lazraq for Hounds
- Best Female Actor: Maeve Jinkings for Toll
- Best Male Actor: Kuan Alvarenga for Toll
- Best Cinematography: Nikolai Zheludovich for Grace
- Honorable Mention: Tina Satter for Reality
- Best Documentary: The Eternal Memory by Maite Alberdi
- Best Short Film: Cuarto de Hora by Nemo Arancibia
- FIPRESCI Award: Monster by Hirokazu Kore-eda
- SkyShowtime Rising Star Award: Hanna Ardéhn

=== Lifetime Achievement Award ===
- Ken Loach

=== Achievement Award ===
- Ethan Hawke

=== Visionary Award ===
- Catherine Breillat
