= The Runaways (2018 film) =

2018 British drama film

- Directed by: Richard Heap
- Screenplay by: Richard Heap
- Produced by: Mario Roberto; Mark Thomas; Richard Heap
- Starring: Mark Addy; Tara Fitzgerald; Molly Windsor
- Edited by: Andrew Knight
- Music by: Andrew Swarbrick
- Production company: Slackjaw Film
- Release date: October 2018
- Running time: 109 minutes
- Country: United Kingdom
- Language: English
- Budget: £800,000

The Runaways is a 2018 British film that is set in North Yorkshire, England. The story revolves around three children who embark on a journey to find their mother. The film, which stars Mark Addy and Tara Fitzgerald, was put out on general release in 2019.

== Synopsis ==
Three siblings, Angie (Molly Windsor), Polly (Macy Shackleton) and Ben (Rhys Connah), go on the run from Social Services when their father dies. They are trying to get to the home of their estranged mother. On the way, they take two donkeys with them from the family's beach donkey business.

== Cast ==
- Mark Addy
- Tara Fitzgerald
- Lee Boardman
- Molly Windsor
- Rhys Connah
- Macy Shackleton

== Production ==
Filming took place across the North York Moors, but mostly in the towns of Thirsk and Whitby in North Yorkshire. It was shot over a six-week period in the summer of 2017. Because of that, the film was premiered in Whitby in October 2018. Other filming location included Runswick Bay, and two of the stations on the North York Moors Railway (Grosmont and Goathland).

== Reception ==
Izzy Sharp, writing in The MancUnion gave the film four stars out of five, and said that the whilst some of the jokes were clunky, the young actors in the film were to be praised for their performance; "...the acting is wonderful, especially from the young cast". Graham Walker, writing in The Yorkshire Post, described the film as "Dark, Haunting. Atmospheric, Uplifting. Don't miss it."
