= Lucina Hackman =

- Education: University of Dundee
- Occupation: Researcher
- Employer: University of Dundee
- Awards: Dame Commander of the Order of the British Empire (2026 Birthday Honours, 2026)
- Website: www.dundee.ac.uk/people/lucina-hackman

Dame Sarah Lucina Hackman is a British forensic anthropologist and Chair of Forensic Anthropology and Head of Discipline, Centre for Anatomy and Human Identification, at the University of Dundee.

She is a chartered forensic anthropologist at, and serves as chair of the forensic anthropology group of, the Royal Anthropological Institute of Great Britain and Ireland, and is the institute's vice-president.

Hackman was appointed a Dame Commander of the Order of the British Empire (DBE) in the 2026 Birthday Honours, "for services to forensic anthropology and disaster victim identification".

She acts as a registered forensic expert for the National Crime Agency and is an advisor to Interpol. She appears as an expert witness in court cases, on matters including the age of asylum seekers and refugees, identification verification and trauma.

She is lead author of the "Judicial Primer in Forensic Anthropology", published jointly by the Royal Society and Royal Society of Edinburgh and of the "UK Code of Practice in Forensic Anthropology" published by the Forensic Regulator and the Royal Anthropological Institute.

Hackman and her colleague Catriona Davies featured in a 2017 episode of the CBBC children's factual television show All Over the Workplace. She was also a scientific advisor for the TV drama Traces.

She is described by the UK government as:

a global expert who has changed the way that mass fatality events in the UK are investigated, also leading novel research that has seen child sexual abusers brought to justice and removed from society.
