= Marilyn (2018 film) =

2018 film

- Film poster
- Directed by: Martín Rodríguez Redondo
- Written by: Martín Rodríguez Redondo
- Produced by: Paula Zyngierman
- Starring: Walter Rodríguez
- Cinematography: Guillermo Saposnik
- Edited by: Felipe Gálvez Haberle
- Music by: Laurent Apffel
- Production companies: MaravillaCine; Quijote Films
- Release date: 19 February 2018 (Berlin)
- Running time: 79 minutes
- Countries: Argentina; Chile
- Language: Spanish

Marilyn is a 2018 Argentine-Chilean drama film written and directed by Martín Rodríguez Redondo and based on the true story of Marilyn (Marcelo Bernasconi). It was screened in the Panorama section at the 68th Berlin International Film Festival.

== Plot ==
Marcos is an 17-year-old living on a rented cattle ranch with his older brother and parents, Carlos and Olga. Marcos has sewn female clothing and stolen accessories and attends a local carnival dressed as his female alter-ego, Marilyn. There, he dances with the son of a local rancher, who recognizes who Marilyn is and feels embarrassed. As Marcos leaves the carnival and heads home, he is stopped by the rancher's son and raped. When Marilyn returns home the next morning, Olga is furious at her child's activities and destroys all of his female clothing.

When Carlos dies suddenly, the family is forced to consider leaving the ranch and moving to a new urban development. While visiting the development, Marcos meets another young man who works in a local shop and they begin a relationship. Olga discovers the relationship and takes away Marcos' mobile phone. He wakes up early one morning and kills both his brother and his mother.

== Cast ==
- Walter Rodríguez as Marcos and Marilyn
- Catalina Saavedra as Olga
- Germán de Silva as Carlos
