= Dreamers (2025 film) =

2025 United Kingdom film

- Festival release poster
- Directed by: Joy Gharoro-Akpojotor
- Screenplay by: Joy Gharoro-Akpojotor
- Produced by: Emily Morgan
- Starring: Ronkẹ Adékoluẹjo; Ann Akinjirin; Diana Yekinni; Aiysha Hart
- Cinematography: Anna Patarakina
- Edited by: Arttu Salmi
- Music by: Ré Olunuga
- Production companies: Quiddity Films; BBC Film
- Distributed by: The Yellow Affair
- Release date: 18 February 2025 (Berlinale)
- Running time: 79 minutes
- Country: United Kingdom
- Language: English

Dreamers is a 2025 British drama film written and directed by Joy Gharoro-Akpojotor in her directorial debut. The film, starring Ronkẹ Adékoluẹjo follows her as Isio, who is caught working without papers, trapped inside Hatchworth, where she learns that finding love, friendship and freedom sometimes means doing the wrong things.

The film selected in Panorama 2025 had its premiere at the 75th Berlin International Film Festival on 18 February 2025. It is also selected for 39th Teddy Award, and will compete for Best Feature Film.

== Synopsis ==
Nigerian migrant Isio, detained in the United Kingdom’s Hatchworth Removal Centre after living illegally for two years, hopes her asylum request will be fairly reviewed. Committed to following the rules, she resists the escape plans of her roommate and love interest, Farah. As her asylum is repeatedly denied, Isio’s faith wavers, but unforeseen challenges force her to take matters into her own hands. Though freedom remains out of reach, Isio and Farah’s love endures.

== Cast ==
- Ronkẹ Adékoluẹjo as Isio
- Ann Akinjirin as Farah
- Diana Yekinni as Nana
- Aiysha Hart as Atefeh
- Harriet Webb as Holly
- Jamie Bacon as James

== Production ==
The film is produced by Emily Morgan's United Kingdom company Quiddity Films, developed with BBC Film and the British Film Institute, through National Lottery funding. The filming was wrapped up in April 2024 in United Kingdom.

In September 2024, it was selected in BFI London Film Festival works-in-progress showcase, which took place on 12 October.

The film is financed by BBC Film, Newen Connect, Finite Films and OnSight.

== Release ==
Dreamers had its World premiere in the Panorama section of the 75th Berlin International Film Festival on 18 February 2025. It was also selected to compete in the First Feature Competition section of the 2025 BFI London Film Festival for the Sutherland Award for Best First Feature and had screening on 10 October 2025. It also competed in New Directors Competition at the São Paulo International Film Festival and had screening on 17 October 2025.

In April 2024, the international sales rights of the film were acquired by The Yellow Affair.

== Accolades ==
Award	Ceremony date	Category	Recipient	Result	Ref.
Berlin International Film Festival	23 February 2025	Panorama Audience Award for Best Feature Film	Joy Gharoro-Akpojotor	Nominated	
Berlin International Film Festival	23 February 2025	Teddy Award for Best Feature Films	Joy Gharoro-Akpojotor	Nominated	
BFI London Film Festival	19 October 2025	Sutherland Award for Best First Feature	Dreamers	Nominated	
