= Esther Phiri =

Zambian boxer (born 1987)

Personal information
- Nationality: Zambian
- Born: June 14, 1987 (age 39) Lusaka, Zambia
- Weight: Bantam weight

Boxing career

Boxing record
- Total fights: 19
- Wins: 14
- Win by KO: 5
- Losses: 1
- Draws: 3
- No contests: 1

Esther Phiri (born June 14, 1987) is a Former World Female Boxing Champion Zambian boxer. Esther was stripped of her title after her retirement. Esther is the first female Zambian boxer to get international recognition and accolades. She became world champion after defeating Belinda Laracuente.

== Biography ==
Phiri was still a teenager when, after the death of her father, she made a living selling fruit and vegetables. She became a mother at age 16. Boxing was a way for her to escape poverty and support her own child, and the children of her older sister, who had died. She was encouraged by Anthony Mwamba, a former boxer she met in 2003. Her first fight was in 2005. She won the GBU (Global Boxing Union) intercontinental belt for lightweights on June 30, 2007, at the expense of Radostina Valcheva and then retained it by beating Belinda Laracuente on 1 December 2007. The following year, she won the same belt but in the lower super-featherweight class.

Phiri became WIBA welterweight world champion after beating Duda Yankovich, May 29, 2010. Other important fights won by this boxer are those against Lely Luz Florez, in 2011, and Monalisa Sibanda, in 2012. She also invests in real estate.

== Documentary film ==
The documentary film Between Rings: The Esther Phiri Story, released in 2014, was co-written and co-directed by her cousin Jessie Chisi. It tells Phiri's story, how she left her marriage to pursue a career in boxing, torn between her own goals and her family and societal expectations.

== Professional boxing record ==
| 19 fights | 14 wins | 1 loss |
|---|---|---|
| By knockout | 5 | 0 |
| By decision | 9 | 1 |
| Draws | 3 | |
| No contests | 1 | |

| No. | Result | Record | Opponent | Type | Round, time | Date | Location | Notes |
|---|---|---|---|---|---|---|---|---|
| 19 | Draw | 14-1-3 | Sandra Almeida | TD | 3 (10) | 2015-05-22 | Government Complex, Lusaka | interim Women's International Boxing Association World Welterweight Title |
| 18 | Win | 14-1-2 | Everline Odero | PTS | 8 (10) | 2014-12-20 | Chez-Ntemba, Lusaka | |
| 17 | Win | 13-1-2 | Monalisa Sibanda | KO | 7 (10) | 2012-02-17 | Mulungushi Conference Centre, Lusaka | International Boxing Organization World Female Super Lightweight Title Women's International Boxing Association World Super Lightweight Title |
| 16 | Win | 12-1-2 | Lely Luz Florez | UD | 10 (10) | 2011-01-29 | Mulungushi Conference Centre, Lusaka | vacant International Boxing Organization World Female Super Lightweight Title Women's International Boxing Association World Super Lightweight Title |
| 15 | Win | 11-1-2 | Duda Yankovich | UD | 10 (10) | May 29, 2010 | Mulungushi Conference Centre, Lusaka, Zambia | vacant Women's International Boxing Association World super lightweight title |
| 14 | Draw | 11-1-2 | Terri Blair | SD | 10 (10) | 2009-11-28 | Mulungushi Conference Centre, Lusaka | vacant Women's International Boxing Association World Super Lightweight Title |
| 13 | Win | 10-1-1 | Viparat Lasuwan | TKO | 4 (10) | 2009-04-26 | Hood Restaurant, Nairobi | |
| 12 | Win | 9-1-1 | Hondi Hernandez | TKO | 5 (10) | 2008-10-04 | Woodlands Stadium, Lusaka | Global Boxing Union Female World Super Featherweight Title |
| 11 | Win | 8-1-1 | Elina Tissen | UD | 10 (10) | 2008-04-26 | Woodlands Stadium, Lusaka, Zambia | vacant Global Boxing Union Female World Super Featherweight Title |
| 10 | Win | 7-1-1 | Belinda Laracuente | UD | 8 (8) | Dec 1, 2007 | Woodlands Stadium, Lusaka, Zambia | |
| 9 | Win | 6-1-1 | Radostina Valcheva | RTD | 2 (10) | 2007-06-30 | Woodlands Stadium, Lusaka, Zambia | |
| 8 | Win | 5-1-1 | Monika Petrova | UD | 8 (8) | 2007-03-18 | Mulungushi Conference Centre, Lusaka | |
| 7 | Win | 4-1-1 | Kelli Cofer | MD | 8 (8) | 2006-12-02 | Moi International Sport Centre, Nairobi | |
| 6 | Win | 3-1-1 | Patience Master | PTS | 6 (6) | 2006-10-22 | National Sports Development Centre, Lusaka | |
| 5 | Win | 2-1-1 | Patience Master | KO | 2 (4) | 2006-05-27 | International ConventionCenter, Harare (Salisbury) | |
| 4 | Win | 1-1-1 | Patience Master | SD | 4 (4) | 2006-05-06 | Nchanga Mine Club, Chingola | |
| 3 | NC | 0-1-1-1 | Monalisa Sibanda | NC | 1 (4) | 2005-10-15 | Mbare Netball Complex, Harare (Salisbury) | |
| 2 | Loss | 0-1-1 | Fatuma Zarika | PTS | 4 (4) | 2005-08-21 | Moi International Sport Centre, Nairobi | |
| 1 | Draw | 0-0-1 | Jota Sumaili | PTS | 4 (4) | 2005-07-23 | Mindolo Dam, Kitwe | |
