= Traces (TV series) =

British crime drama series

- Genre: Crime drama
- Created by: Val McDermid; Amelia Bullmore
- Written by: Amelia Bullmore; Val McDermid
- Directed by: Mary Nighy; Rebecca Gatward
- Starring: Molly Windsor; Laura Fraser; Jennifer Spence; Martin Compston; Michael Nardone; John Gordon Sinclair
- Country of origin: United Kingdom
- Original language: English
- No. of series: 2
- No. of episodes: 12

Production
- Executive producers: Philippa Collie Cousins; Michaela Fereday
- Producer: Juliet Charlesworth
- Running time: 45 minutes

Original release
- Network: Alibi
- Release: 9 December 2019 – 22 March 2022

Traces is a British television crime drama produced by Red Production Company (a StudioCanal company). Co-created and written by Val McDermid and Amelia Bullmore, and based upon an original idea by McDermid, it originally premiered on Alibi on 9 December 2019. The series was rerun on BBC One on 4 January 2021 and series one began repeating on Drama on 15 January 2022, A second six-episode series was released in February 2022. and was shown on BBC One from 30 March 2024.

== Synopsis ==
Traces focuses on three female forensic professionals, Emma Hedges, Sarah Gordon and Kathy Torrance, working together at the fictional Scottish Institute of Forensic Science and Anatomy (SIFA) at the fictional University of Tayside in Dundee, Scotland, as they uncover the truth of a murder case and bring a killer to justice.

== Cast and characters ==
In the first series, the cast was as follows:

- Molly Windsor as Emma Hedges, a laboratory technician who has moved back to her birthplace of Dundee, for her new job, and in search of answers about her mother's murder.
- Laura Fraser as Sarah Gordon, professor of Chemistry at the University of Tayside and Emma's new boss at SIFA.
- Jennifer Spence as Kathy Torrence, a professor of forensic anthropology at the University of Tayside and a colleague at SIFA.
- Martin Compston as Daniel MacAfee, director of a construction company and romantic interest of Emma.
- Vincent Regan as Phil MacAfee, Daniel's father and former director of MacAfee Construction.
- Michael Nardone as Detective Inspector Neil McKinven, a friend of Professor Gordon who has insight on the Marie Monroe case.
- Phil McKee as Jimmy Levin, husband of Marie Monroe and Emma's stepfather.
- John Gordon Sinclair as Drew Cubbin, Emma's father and ex-partner of Marie Monroe.
- Morayo Akandé as Detective Constable Trina Adeboyo, colleague of DI McKinven at Police Scotland.
- Jamie Marie Leary as Skye Alessi, Emma's childhood best friend.
- Carly Anderson as Marie Monroe, Emma's mother who was murdered in 2001, and whose case remains unsolved.
- Laurie Brett as Izzy Alessi, best friend of Marie Monroe, and mother to Emma's childhood best friend Skye.
- Joana Borja as Pia Salvador, forensic scientist and love interest of Professor Torrence.
- Andrea Hart as Janine Muir, SIFA's receptionist.
- Anna Leong Brophy as Louise Chiu Jones, chemist and Emma's colleague at SIFA who works alongside her in the lab.
- Neve McIntosh as Julie Hedges, Emma's maternal aunt, who adopted her after the murder of her mother and took her to Manchester.
- Janey Godley as Clare Tindall, a criminal defence lawyer who represents Daniel.

== Episodes ==
=== Series overview ===
Series	Episodes	Originally released	
Series	Episodes	First released	Last released
1	6	9 December 2019	24 December 2019
2	6	15 February 2022	22 March 2022

=== Series 1 (2019) ===
No. overall	No. in series	Title	Directed by	Written by	Original release date	UK viewers (millions)
1	1	"Episode 1"	Mary Nighy	Amelia Bullmore	9 December 2019	1.00
2	2	"Episode 2"	Mary Nighy	Amelia Bullmore	10 December 2019	0.89
3	3	"Episode 3"	Mary Nighy	Amelia Bullmore	16 December 2019	0.84
4	4	"Episode 4"	Mary Nighy	Amelia Bullmore	17 December 2019	0.79
5	5	"Episode 5"	Mary Nighy	Amelia Bullmore	23 December 2019	0.81
6	6	"Episode 6"	Mary Nighy	Amelia Bullmore	24 December 2019	0.83

=== Series 2 (2022) ===
No. overall	No. in series	Title	Directed by	Written by	Original release date	UK viewers (millions)
7	1	"Episode 1"	Chris Foggin	Amelia Bullmore	15 February 2022	N/A
8	2	"Episode 2"	Chris Foggin	Amelia Bullmore	22 February 2022	N/A
9	3	"Episode 3"	Chris Foggin	Jess Williams	1 March 2022	N/A
10	4	"Episode 4"	Claire Winyard	Jess Williams	8 March 2022	N/A
11	5	"Episode 5"	Claire Winyard	Amelia Bullmore	15 March 2022	N/A
12	6	"Episode 6"	Claire Winyard	Amelia Bullmore	22 March 2022	N/A

== Production ==
Traces is set in and around Dundee, but the majority of the series was filmed in Bolton. The theme tune is a cover of Nina Simone's "Don't Let Me Be Misunderstood" by Valerie Broussard.

Lucina Hackman, a forensic anthropologist, was among the series' scientific advisors.

== Critical reception ==
Stuart Heritage reviewing on behalf of The Guardian rated the series three out of five, and whilst acknowledging the series is loaded with talent, said "this is what happens when TV runs out of new shows". The Times awarded the series two out of five, with Carol Midgley saying that "the biggest crime here so far is a lack of flavour".
