= Duda Yankovich =

Brazilian mixed martial artist (born 1976)

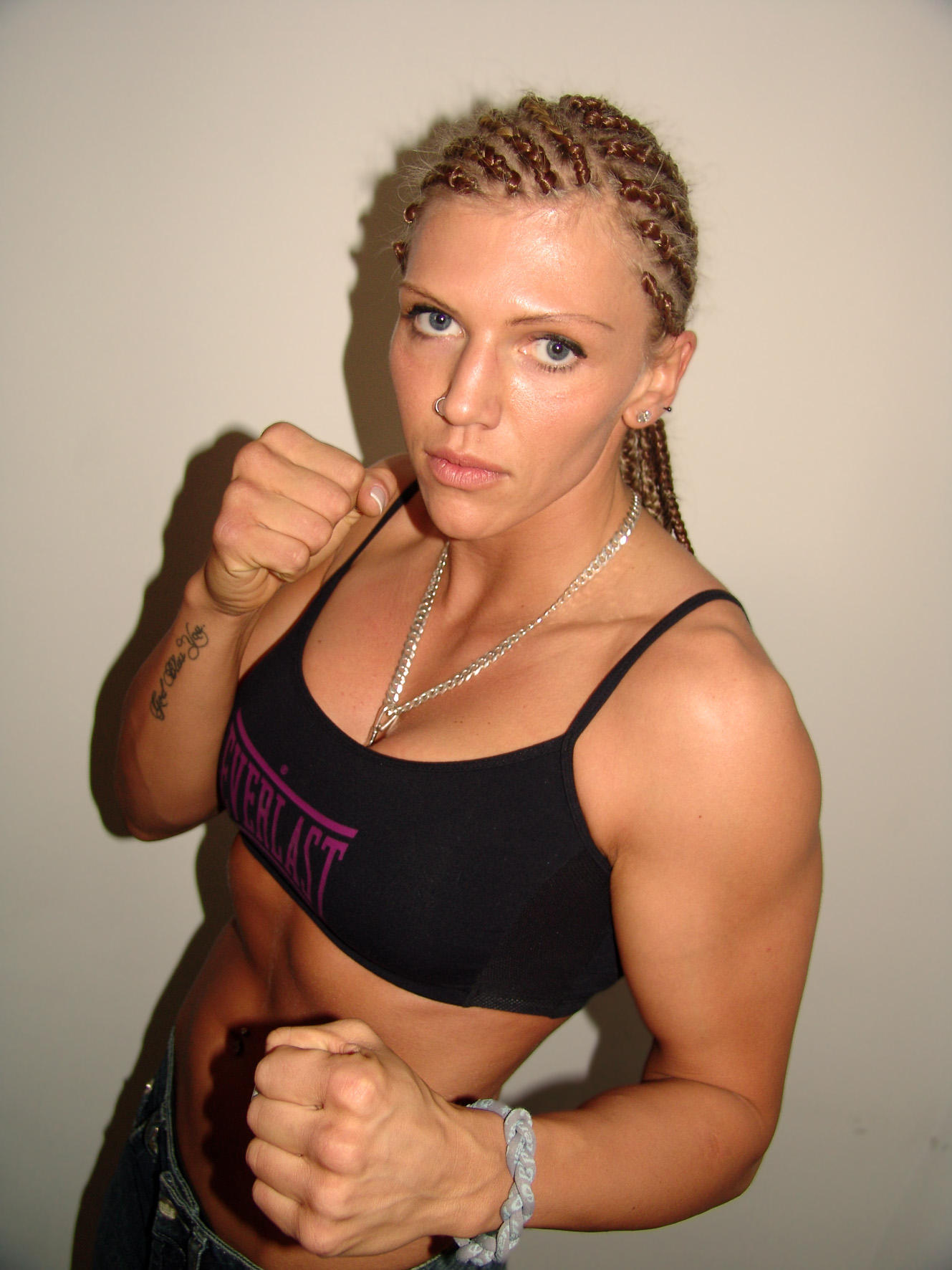
- Yankovich in 2006
- Born: Dušica Janković; September 27, 1976 (age 50); Jagodina, SR Serbia, SFR Yugoslavia
- Native name: Дуда Јанковић / Duda Janković
- Other names: Diamond
- Nationality: Brazilian
- Height: 5 ft 6 in (1.68 m)
- Weight: 135 lb (61 kg; 9.6 st)
- Division: Bantamweight
- Reach: 70.0 in (178 cm)
- Style: Boxing, Kickboxing
- Stance: Orthodox
- Years active: 2005–2013 (Boxing); 2012–2013 (MMA)

Professional boxing record
- Total: 15
- Wins: 11
- By knockout: 5
- Losses: 4
- By knockout: 2

Mixed martial arts record
- Total: 4
- Wins: 1
- By submission: 1
- Losses: 3
- By knockout: 2
- By submission: 1

Other information
- Boxing record from BoxRec
- Mixed martial arts record from Sherdog

Duda Yankovich (Serbian: Дуда Јанковић / Duda Janković; born September 27, 1976) is a Serbian-born former boxer and mixed martial arts fighter. She has been living in Brazil since 1999. Yankovich was the Women's International Boxing Association (WIBA) 2006 light welterweight world champion.

== Martial arts ==
Involved in martial arts since the age of 11, Yankovich was the youngest black belt in the history of Shotokan karate in Serbia. In 1994, she competed in the European Championships in Prague, winning a silver medal. That same year, she also won the bronze medal at the Junior World Championships in Zakopane, Poland. She also became involved in kickboxing and became Serbia Kickboxing Champion in 1996–1999, and Balkan Champion in 1998 and 1999. Yankovich moved to Brazil in 1999, as a result of the Yugoslav civil war, and became Brazilian Kickboxing Champion in 2001–2003.

== Boxing ==
In 2002, she became involved with amateur boxing, training for four months with the team of former world champion, Acelino Freitas. In 2005, Yankovich represented Brazil in the First Pan-American female boxing amateur championship in Buenos Aires, Argentina. She took third place and a bronze medal in the 138-lb division.

On 23 July 2005, she made her professional boxing debut against Argentinian, Wilhelmina Fernandez. She won on in fourth round by knockout. Then she brought three more fights, winning all by knockout. During this time, Yankovich chose to abandon kickboxing competitions and to dedicate her time to reaching a World Title race in Boxing.

== World champion ==
After two more international victories, Yankovich become a contender for a Women's International Boxing Association (WIBA) title in the category of super light. She won this World Title dispute by a unanimous decision.

After the world title win in November 2006, Yankovich made her first defense of the World Title on March 17, 2007, against American Belinda Laracuente, winning by points in a challenge that lasted 10 rounds. Soon after she won against Colombian Paola Rojas in São Paulo and then also won against the Colombian Liliana Palmera in Campo Grande – MS. In April 2008 Yankovich gave a rematch to Darys Pardo and again beat the Colombian.

On July 5, 2009, Yankovich fought with the US and WIBA champion Holly Holm (a category above her weight) and suffered her first loss in boxing, by doctor's stoppage.

On May 29, 2010, after nearly a year away from the ring due to injury suffered in the last fight held in the United States, Yankovich eventually lost her World Champion title to Esther Phiri in Lusaka, Zambia, in a defeat on points by a unanimous decision.

On April 29, 2011, Yankovich tried to win the WBC World Title. She lost the fight to Anne Sophie Mathis in Paris, France, in a defeat by TKO.

== Mixed martial arts ==
Yankovich trains at Team Nogueira, and made her MMA debut on September 8, 2012, at Bitetti Combat 12 against Jéssica Andrade. She lost by submission with a guillotine.

In search of her first win in MMA, Yankovich faced Daniela Cristina on March 9, 2013, at Bitetti Combat 14. She won by submission with an Americana. Yankovich has fought in promotions such as Invicta.

== A Fazenda 4 ==
Yankovich attended the fourth edition of reality television show A Fazenda (The Farm), where she was expelled after assaulting the participant Thiago Gagliasso during a test, in which participants competed in a basketball mini-championship in the pool. At one point, Yankovich argued that Thiago pulled her bikini, after which she slapped his head. According to the rules of A Fazenda, any kind of aggression is punished with immediate elimination.

== Professional boxing record ==
15 fights	11 wins	4 losses
By knockout	5	2
By decision	6	2

No.	Result	Record	Opponent	Type	Round, time	Date	Location	Notes
15	Loss	11–4	(Colombia) Enis Pacheco	UD	10, 2:00	Mar 16, 2012	Coliseo Cubierto Elías Chegwin, Barranquilla, Colombia	vacant WBO World female lightweight title
14	Loss	11–3	(France) Anne Sophie Mathis	TKO	3	Apr 29, 2011	Espace Roger Boisrame, Pontault Combault, Seine-et-Marne, France	WBC World female super featherweight title
13	Loss	11–2	(Zambia) Esther Phiri	UD	10, 2:00	May 29, 2010	Mulungushi Conference Centre, Lusaka, Zambia	vacant Women's International Boxing Association World super lightweight title
12	Loss	11–1	(United States) Holly Holm	TKO	4, 0:32	Jun 5, 2009	(United States) Route 66 Casino, Albuquerque, New Mexico, USA	vacant International Boxing Association female super lightweight title
11	Win	11–0	(Colombia) Darys Esther Pardo	UD	8, 2:00	Apr 19, 2008	Sao Paulo, Sao Paulo, Brazil	
10	Win	10–0	(Colombia) Liliana Palmera	UD	10, 2:00	Sep 15, 2007	Campo Grande, Mato Grosso do Sul, Brazil	Women's International Boxing Association World super lightweight title
9	Win	9–0	(Colombia) Paola Rojas	UD	10, 2:00	Jun 16, 2007	Maksoud Plaza Hotel, Sao Paulo, Brazil	Women's International Boxing Association World super lightweight title
8	Win	8–0	(Puerto Rico) Belinda Laracuente	UD	10, 2:00	Mar 17, 2007	Companhia Athletica Brooklyn, Sao Paulo, Sao Paulo, Brazil	Women's International Boxing Association World super lightweight title
7	Win	7–0	(Colombia) Darys Esther Pardo	UD	10, 2:00	Nov 25, 2006	Companhia Athletica Brooklyn, Sao Paulo, Sao Paulo, Brazil	vacant Women's International Boxing Association World super lightweight title
6	Win	6–0	(Argentina) Silvia Fernanda Zacarias	MD	6, 2:00	Sep 30, 2006	Companhia Athletica Brooklyn, Sao Paulo, Sao Paulo, Brazil	
5	Win	5–0	(Argentina) Gabriela Marcela Zapata	TKO	2	Aug 26, 2006	E.C. Santo Andre, Santo Andre, Sao Paulo, Brazil	
4	Win	4–0	(Brazil) Leticia Rojo	TKO	5, 1:12	Aug 11, 2006	Ginasio Municipal, Ibirapuera, Sao Paulo, Brazil	
3	Win	3–0	(Colombia) Angie Paola Rocha	KO	4, 0:42	May 13, 2006	Desportivo Baby Barione, Sao Paulo, Sao Paulo, Brazil	
2	Win	2–0	(Brazil) Sandra Jeronimo	TKO	1	Oct 29, 2005	Cajamar, Sao Paulo, Brazil	
1	Win	1–0	(Argentina) Guillermina Fernandez	KO	4	Jul 23, 2005	Gimnasio Municipal, Embu das Artes, Sao Paulo, Brazil	

== Mixed martial arts record ==
Professional record breakdown
4 matches	1 win	3 losses
By knockout	0	2
By submission	1	1

Res.	Record	Opponent	Method	Event	Date	Round	Time	Location	Notes
Loss	1–3	Viviane Pereira	TKO (punches)	Bitetti Combat 17	October 31, 2013	2	2:49	Rio de Janeiro, Brazil	
Loss	1–2	Miriam Nakamoto	TKO (knee and punches)	Invicta FC 6: Coenen vs. Cyborg	July 13, 2013	1	2:08	Kansas City, Missouri, United States	
Win	1–1	Daniela Cristina	Technical Submission (americana)	Bitetti Combat 14	March 9, 2013	2	3:59	Rio de Janeiro, Brazil	
Loss	0–1	Jéssica Andrade	Submission (guillotine choke)	Bitetti Combat 12	September 8, 2012	1	3:02	Rio de Janeiro, Brazil	
