= Claire Oakley =

British film director and screenwriter (born 1985)

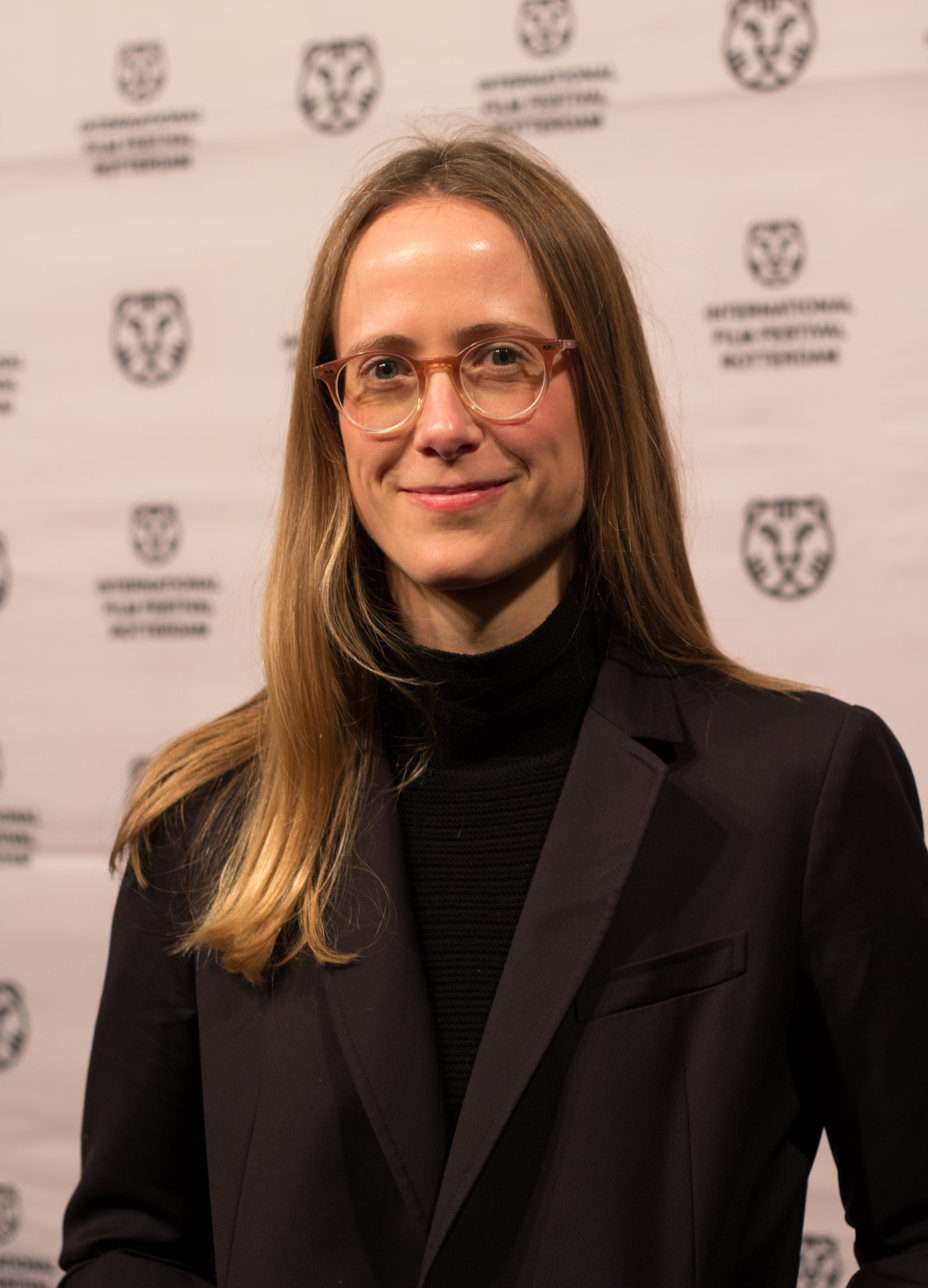
- Born: London, England
- Education: University of Edinburgh
- Occupations: Film Director, Screenwriter
- Years active: 2011–present
- Website: www.claireoakley.com

Claire Oakley (born 1985) is a British film director and screenwriter. She began her career directing multiple short films, including Tracks (2014) and Physics (2012) before writing and directing her first feature film, Make Up (2019).

== Early life and education ==
Oakley was raised in Hammersmith, West London, and studied English Literature at the University of Edinburgh, where she developed an interest in film.

== Career ==
Her career began as a script reader working at various companies, including BBC Films and the BFI, before writing and directing her first short film Beautiful Enough (2010). She subsequently directed four more short films.

Her first feature film Make Up was released in 2020 to critical acclaim; on review aggregator Rotten Tomatoes, 43 critics gave the film a positive review, with Robbie Collin of The Daily Telegraph writing "as poetically teasing as it is psychologically precise, Make Up signals the arrival of an exciting new talent".

In 2023, she made her small-screen directorial debut with three episodes of the Disney+ heist crime thriller Culprits, starring Gemma Arterton and Nathan Stewart-Jarrett.

In recently, Oakley created, wrote and directed the crime thriller series Under Salt Marsh for Sky Television which will premiere in 2026.

She also founded Cinesisters, an "inclusive collective of female directors" with over 175 members, aiming to support and provide resources to female filmmakers.

== Personal life ==
Oakley lives in East London with her wife.

== Filmography ==
Key
†	Denotes films that have not yet been released

=== Feature films ===
Year	Title	Director	Writer	Executive producer
2019	Make Up	Yes	Yes	No

=== Short films ===
Year	Title	Director	Writer	Producer
2010	Beautiful Enough	Yes	Yes	Yes
2012	Physics	Yes	Yes	No
2014	James	Yes	No	No
2014	Tracks	Yes	Yes	No
2016	Waterfall	No	No	Yes
2016	Pumeza: Tuning In	Yes	Yes	No

=== Television series ===
Year	Title	Creator	Director	Writer	Producer	Notes
2023	Culprits	No	Yes	No	No	Episodes 5–7
2026	Under Salt Marsh †	Yes	Yes	Yes	Yes	
