= Unchosen =

British television series

- Release poster
- Genre: Psychological thriller
- Created by: Julie Gearey
- Written by: Julie Gearey
- Directed by: Jim Loach; Philippa Langdale
- Starring: Asa Butterfield; Molly Windsor; Fra Fee; Aston McAuley; Alexa Davies; Lucy Black; Olivia Pickering; Siobhan Finneran; Christopher Eccleston
- Country of origin: United Kingdom
- Original language: English
- No. of series: 1
- No. of episodes: 6

Production
- Executive producers: Iona Vrolyk; Myar Craig-Brown; Julie Gearey
- Producer: Nick Pitt
- Production company: Double Dutch Productions

Original release
- Network: Netflix
- Release: 21 April 2026

Unchosen is a British psychological thriller television series created and written by Julie Gearey, released on Netflix on 21 April 2026. The six-part series stars Molly Windsor as Rosie, a woman living within a strict, isolated religious community whose life is disrupted by a chance encounter with an escaped convict, played by Fra Fee. The series premiered on Netflix on 21 April 2026. Upon release, it became a global streaming success, reaching number one in 69 countries.

Inspired by real-life experiences in high-control religious communities, the show borrows specifically from the Plymouth Brethren Christian Church and other conservative groups to inform its themes of indoctrination and trauma. The production further established this connection by filming key scenes in a former Plymouth Brethren gospel hall in Harrow, London, and actor Asa Butterfield reportedly studied documentaries on the organization to prepare for his role.

== Premise ==
Unchosen is set within the fictional "Fellowship of the Divine," a reclusive and conservative Christian intentional community in rural England led by the authoritative Mr. Phillips (Christopher Eccleston). The community operates under a strict patriarchal hierarchy where technology is largely forbidden, and members are kept isolated from the "unchosen" outside world. Rosie (Molly Windsor), a devoted wife and mother, lives a life defined by obedience and the rigid expectations of the group, despite an increasingly strained and abusive marriage to Adam (Asa Butterfield), a rising figure within the cult’s leadership.

The status quo of the community is upended when a mysterious stranger named Sam (Fra Fee) saves Rosie’s daughter, Grace, from drowning. Welcomed into the Fellowship as a "hero," Sam is a charismatic but dangerous escaped convict who begins to manipulate the emotional and spiritual vulnerabilities of both Rosie and Adam. As Sam’s violent past and true motivations slowly emerge, Rosie is forced to confront the oppressive nature of her faith and fight for her daughter's safety and her own emancipation.

== Cast ==
- Asa Butterfield as Adam
- Molly Windsor as Rosie
- Fra Fee as Sam
- Aston McAuley as Isaac
- Alexa Davies as Hannah
- Lucy Black
- Olivia Pickering as Grace
- Siobhan Finneran as Mrs Phillips
- Christopher Eccleston as Mr Phillips

== Production ==
=== Development ===
Initially titled Out of the Dust, the six-part series was produced for Netflix by Double Dutch Productions, part of Banijay UK. The series is written by Julie Gearey. Jim Loach and Philippa Langdale are directors. Iona Vrolyk and Myar Craig-Brown are executive producers for Double Dutch Productions alongside Gearey. Nick Pitt is series producer.

=== Inspiration ===
Unchosen draws on real-world accounts of high-control religious groups.

According to The Sunday Times, the series "borrows from the Plymouth Brethren and other ultra-conservative groups" in shaping its fictional community. Esquire notes that the production drew on testimonies from former members of similar groups, with creators aiming to reflect those experiences accurately while preserving anonymity. Asa Butterfield also said he watched documentaries on the Plymouth Brethren Christian Church (PBCC) as part of his preparation for the role, noting its patriarchal structure and limitations on technology. According to Netflix, Butterfield additionally cited the BBC documentary Inside the Bruderhof as inspiration used while researching his role.

=== Casting ===
The cast, including Asa Butterfield, Molly Windsor, Fra Fee, Siobhan Finneran and Christopher Eccleston, was announced in August 2024.

=== Filming ===
Principal photography began in the United Kingdom in August 2024. In interviews, director Jim Loach stated that key "Fellowship of the Divine" meeting hall scenes were filmed in a former assembly hall previously used by an organisation that had since vacated the building. He described the structure as having no windows and a single electric sliding entrance that could seal the space, elements which contributed to the atmosphere of control depicted in the series. He noted that placing hundreds of people inside such an enclosed setting, led by a single authority figure, created what he described as an “unnerving” sense of power and control. He also highlighted Christopher Eccleston’s performance as the group’s leader in reinforcing that dynamic. Additional reporting has identified the filming location as a former Plymouth Brethren Christian Church gospel hall in Harrow, London. The building was reportedly used by the church from the late 1990s until 2017 and has since been repurposed for civic use by the local council.

=== Marketing ===
In March 2026, Netflix released a trailer and a set of images along with an announcement that the series would now be titled Unchosen.

== Episodes ==
No.	Title	Directed by	Written by	Original release date
1	"Episode 1"	Jim Loach	Julie Gearey	21 April 2026
2	"Episode 2"	Jim Loach	Julie Gearey	21 April 2026
3	"Episode 3"	Jim Loach	Julie Gearey	21 April 2026
4	"Episode 4"	Philippa Langdale	Julie Gearey	21 April 2026
5	"Episode 5"	Philippa Langdale	Julie Gearey	21 April 2026
6	"Episode 6"	Philippa Langdale	Julie Gearey	21 April 2026

== Summary per episode ==
Episode 1: Rosie, a young woman living in a commune, loses sight of her young daughter Grace after a community picnic. She finds Grace back in the forest; the girl almost drowned, but was rescued by a mysterious stranger. Adam tells Mr Philips his brother Isaac has a mobile phone during a congregation and Isaac is led away to be put in solitary confinement. Rosie disagrees with her husband about telling on Isaac but is scolded. The stranger shows up with his hand wounded and Rosie takes care of it, then makes him leave. He returns and she brings him to the chicken pen to spend the night there. The stranger turns out to be a prisoner who killed someone who attacked him at his reintegration job and then fled the premise.

Episode 2: Rosie's sister-in-law Hannah gives birth to baby boy, whom they name Noah. Isaac is still in solitary confinement; Rosie secretly shows him his child. Isaac asks her to help him escape and she does, driving him into the city and dropping him at his girlfriend’s apartment after she slipped away from a session. Unbeknownst to her, Sam has slipped into the car, and demands she drives away as police drives into the street. They drive off and go to Rosie's home, but then her husband and Mr Philips drive into the driveway.

Episode 3: Rosie hands Sam over to the elders, saying she found him stealing her car but that he wants to join the commune. Hannah tells Adam that Rosie freed Isaac and she is put in solitary confinement, and isn't allowed to see Grace. Sam finds secret letters from Mrs Philips’ estranged son. Hannah has a mental breakdown and goes to Mr Philips, but leaves more upset than she arrives. Rosie sees Mr Philips attack his wife and she steps in and is slapped in the face in the process. Sam is employed at the community saw mill, and calls his brother, who asks him to help him. Adam rapes Rosie, and Rosie asks Sam to help her escape. Rosie confronts Mrs Philips with her sons letters and tells her she needs her help to escape with Grace.

Episode 4: Sam and Rosie go out for food in town. Adam has gay thoughts about Sam. Sam films himself kissing Adam and Adam performing oral sex on him. Isaac comes back to the commune to warn Adam about Sam, but Adam won't listen. Sam's brother Mason comes over and Rosie sees his phone, on which he receives threatening messages. Mason reveals that what happened between Sam and his ex-girlfriend wasn't Sam's fault because the girl "wanted to leave him". Rosie is scared and calls Isaac, who agrees to meet her in the park. While on his way, Sam (who is driving home a drunk Mr Philips) sees Isaac in the car and pushes his car out of the road, killing Isaac in the accident that ensues. Sam puts Mr Philips behind the wheel and runs off.

Episode 5: Rosie looks up information on Sam at a shop and finds out he's a murderer. Mr Philips is removed from his position. The community buries Isaac. Rosie tells Sam she wants to turn him in but he warns her she might go to prison for harbouring a fugitive. The Philips' son comes to their house, having heard of his father's arrest. Rosie tells Adam Sam has to leave but he refuses. Isaac's girlfriend Charley comes to the community to bring letters to his family; Hannah gets into the car and almost drives Charley over, but she is saved by Sam, who pushes her out of the way. Adam struggles with his feelings for Sam. Sam meets Rosie in church and tells her how he strangled his girlfriend when he found out she was seeing someone else. Mrs Philips leaves her husband. Sam meets Mr Philips and Mr Philips realises Sam framed him for the death of Isaac. Sam pursues him and tries to strangle him in his own house, but Grace walks in on them.

Episode 6: Sam brings Grace home to Rosie, then goes back to Mr Philips, whom he tied to a chair. Mr Philips escapes from his community-imposed isolation and runs to his office, where he has a gun. A few brothers run in and drag Mr Philips off. Grace has been acting strange and eventually tells Rosie what she saw happen between Sam and Mr Philips. Rosie tells Adam of Sam's past and that they slept together, and that Sam threatened Grace. Adam tells them to leave and go to his cousin, who's an elder at another congregation, but Rosie tells him she wants to leave the community altogether. Adam goes to bring her to the station, but Sam catches them when they're in the car on the driveway. Sam tries to prevent them from leaving, but Adam attacks him and is slammed to the ground while Grace and Rosie flee into the woods in the pouring rain. Rosie hides Grace, but Sam finds her and tries to drown her. He doesn't pull through, and Rosie escapes with her daughter. They go to Mrs Philips, who is living with her son. In their absence, Sam becomes the leader of the congregation.

== Release ==
The series premiered on Netflix on 21 April 2026, and consists of six episodes.

== Reception ==
On the review aggregator website Rotten Tomatoes, the series holds an approval rating of 62% based on 13 critic reviews. On Metacritic, which uses a weighted average, the series holds a score of 47 out of 100 based on 4 critics, indicating "mixed or average" reviews.

Lucy Mangan of The Guardian gave the series two out of five stars, writing that this "creepy cult show is a total waste of Asa Butterfield's talent".
