= Emily Morgan (film producer) =

British film producer

- Born: England
- Education: University of Oxford; National Film and Television School
- Occupation: Film Producer

Emily Morgan is a British independent film producer and the founder of London-based production company Quiddity Films. She has won a BAFTA and British Independent Film Awards.

== Life and education ==
Morgan studied English at the University of Oxford and later completed an MA in Producing at the National Film and Television School. Prior to launching her production career, she worked in international film sales and distribution.

== Career ==
Morgan began her producing career with short films and debut features from emerging filmmakers. In 2016, she founded Quiddity Films, a UK-based production company focused on producing auteur-driven and internationally collaborative cinema. Her debut feature as a producer was I Am Not a Witch, which was backed for development and production by BFI Film Funds Network and premiered in Directors' Fortnight at the Cannes Film Festival. She went on to win the BAFTA for Outstanding Debut by a British Writer, Director or Producer in 2018, as well as the British Independent Film Award for Breakthrough Producer.

In 2019, Morgan produced the feature film Make Up, which was developed over several years and secured funding through the UK's iFeatures initiative. The film was screen on October 4, 2019 at the London Film Festival. It was released in 2020 to critical acclaim. In 2020, she produced romantic drama film starring Colin Firth and Stanley Tucci. It had its world premiere at the 68th San Sebastián International Film Festival on 22 September 2020 and was acquired for North American rights by Bleecker Street.

In 2023, Morgan co-produced The Settlers, which premiered in the Official Selection at the 76th Cannes Film Festival, where it won the FIPRESCI Prize. It was also Chile's official submission for the Best International Feature Film category at the 96th Academy Awards. In 2024, she produced Swimming Home, a psychological drama starring Christopher Abbott and Mackenzie Davis, which explored themes of desire, identity, and emotional rupture during a family holiday in the south of France. The film was backed by the BFI and premiered at the 53rd International Film Festival Rotterdam.

In 2025, Morgan produced Dreamers, which premiered in the Panorama section of the 75th Berlin International Film Festival and was supported by BBC Film and the BFI.

== Recognition & affiliations ==
Morgan was recognized as one of Screen International's Stars of Tomorrow in 2015 and Future Leader in 2018. In 2019, she was selected as one of Producers on the Move by European Film Promotion. Quiddity Films was included in Screen Daily’s Brit 50 list of top emerging UK production companies in 2020.

== Selected filmography ==
Year	Film	Role	Notes
2017	I am not a Witch	Producer	Debut feature; Cannes Directors' Fortnight; BAFTA Award winner
2019	Make Up	Producer	Multiple festival screenings, critical acclaim
2020	Supernova	Producer	Multiple festival screenings, critical acclaim
2023	The Settlers	Producer	Premiered at Cannes Un Certain Regard; official Chilean entry for 2024 Academy Awards
2024	Swimming Home	Producer	
2025	Dreamers	Producer	Supported by BBC Film
