= The Settlers (2023 film) =

2023 western film

- Chilean theatrical release poster
- Spanish: Los colonos
- Directed by: Felipe Gálvez Haberle
- Written by: Felipe Gálvez Haberle; Antonia Girardi; Mariano Llinás (collaboration)
- Produced by: Stefano Centini; Santiago Galleli; Thierry Lenouvel; Emily Morgan; Giancarlo Nasi; Matias Roveda
- Starring: Camilo Arancibia; Mark Stanley; Benjamin Westfall; Alfredo Castro; Marcelo Alonso; Sam Spruell; Mishell Guaña; Adriana Stuven
- Cinematography: Simone D'Arcangelo
- Edited by: Matthieu Taponier
- Music by: Harry Allouche
- Production companies: Quijote Films; Rei Cine; Quiddity Films; Volos Films; Cinema Inutile; Cine Sud Promotion; Snowglobe Film I Väst; Finite Films; Sutor Kolonko
- Distributed by: Dulac Distribution (France); Mubi (Latin America, United Kingdom, Germany); Cinecolor Films (Chile); Maco Cine (Argentina); Lucky Dogs (Sweden)
- Release dates: 22 May 2023 (Cannes); 20 December 2023 (France)
- Running time: 97 minutes
- Countries: Chile; Argentina; United Kingdom; Taiwan; Germany; Sweden; France; Denmark
- Languages: Spanish; English
- Box office: $113,466

The Settlers (Spanish: Los colonos) is a 2023 revisionist Western drama film directed by Felipe Gálvez Haberle (in his directorial debut), who co-wrote the script with Antonia Girardi in collaboration with Mariano Llinás. The film stars Mark Stanley, Camilo Arancibia, Benjamin Westfall, Alfredo Castro, Mishell Guaña, Sam Spruell, Marcelo Alonso, and Adriana Stuven. It is a co-production between Chile, Argentina, the United Kingdom, Taiwan, France, Denmark, Sweden, and Germany.

The Settlers had its world premiere at the Un Certain Regard section of the 76th Cannes Film Festival on 17 May 2023, where it competed for the Caméra d'Or and was honored with the FIPRESCI Prize, becoming the first Chilean production to win that award.

It was selected as the Chilean entry for Best International Feature Film at the 96th Academy Awards, but was not nominated.

== Plot ==
In 1901, Segundo, a young Chilean tracker and mestizo, lieutenant Alexander MacLennan, a Scottish veteran and Bill, an American mercenary, embark on an expedition within the plains of Tierra del Fuego to delimit and reclaim the lands that the Chilean state has granted to businessman José Menéndez. The supposedly administrative expedition is actually a thinly veiled front to violently hunt and clear the lands of the Onas, the natives of the archipelago. The Selknam genocide lies at the core of the film.

Thanks to his exceptional shooting skills, Segundo is chosen by MacLennan to accompany him on his task, and Bill is appointed by Menéndez to join them.

Bill expresses his distrust of Segundo and challenges MacLennan's rank, citing a lack of men following him. MacLennan counters that Segundo is disciplined and that one disciplined man is better than ten undisciplined ones. Regardless, Segundo is frequently disrespected and undermined by the both of them, and he remains mostly silent throughout the mission.

After three days of travel, they find a band of soldiers on the Argentine border accompanying academic Francisco Moreno who has been tasked with ratifying the borders between Argentina and Chile. After a day of pastime competitions between the men, Moreno muses on the dangers of letting a military grow bored and shows a perverse interest in the Selk'nam, citing that they should be formally educated to serve a growing modern society. MacLennan asks the captain if he knows the location of more natives.

The trio continue on their mission the following day and notice a small camp of natives from afar, including women and infants. Segundo is forced to accompany MacLennan and Bill as they begin methodically killing most of the people there. Segundo is able to avoid shooting anyone and goes unnoticed; though he is given an opportunity to shoot Bill during the slaughter, he ultimately decides not to.

In the evening, MacLennan and Bill take turns raping a young female survivor. When Segundo refuses to participate upon MacLennan's encouragement, MacLennan berates him and threatens to kill him if he doesn't. Segundo acquiesces, but instead mercy-kills the young woman when he reaches her, choking her to death.

The next day, the trio are approached by a band of mercenaries led Colonel Martin, an English veteran of the Second Boer War. Martin insists they join them for a shared dinner, which MacLennan is reluctantly forced to accept. In the evening, Martin deciphers MacLennan's rank as a private through his uniform, exposing him. After Bill sarcastically remarks how a higher ranking officer would be willing to share a meal with a private, Martin shoots Bill dead in disgust. Martin offers MacLennan a native woman, Kiepja, as replacement for Bill, citing that his tastes are "more refined". The colonel then rapes MacLennan in exchange. Segundo, MacLennan and Kiepja all depart together the next morning.

Seven years later, José Menéndez is living in a Chilean mansion in Punta Arenas. He receives a visit from a man named Marcial Vicuña, sent from the capital to assess what can be done for the people of Chile in celebration of its centennial. Menéndez claims that many men have visited this area before and only focused on the negatives without really helping. Vicuña asks if the negatives he refers to include the deeds of men like Alexander MacLennan, posthumously nicknamed 'The Red Pig' for the atrocities he committed against the natives. Menéndez reveals that MacLennan is now dead, but defends his former employee's actions, referring to him as a Lieutenant.

Though Vicuña expresses his desire to speak to the Onas as a peace offering, he reveals to Menéndez that his true objective is to bury some of the more violent aspects of how he came to own so much land, citing that "wool stained with blood loses all value".

Segundo has since married Kiepja, now going by the name Rosa, and the two live in relative peace on Segundo's home island of Chiloé.

Vicuña visits Segundo and explains that he wishes to report details of the crimes Menéndez had him commit. Segundo details that he continued to serve under MacLennan, that Menéndez had appointed MacLennan as "Peace Judge" and Rosa was intended to help translate discussions between MacLennan and the natives. However, Segundo then goes on to tell of a time when MacLennan held a great beachside banquet for over three hundred Native Americans. Once the attendees were drunk, MacLennan and his men, alongside Segundo, massacred them.

Vicuña then sets the couple up with a tea set in front of them. He instructs them to drink the tea as a display of good faith while he films. Segundo obliges, but Rosa staunchly does not, despite Vicuña's increasingly impatient demands.

== Cast ==
- Camilo Arancibia as Segundo
- Mark Stanley as Alexander MacLennan
- Benjamin Westfall as Bill
- Alfredo Castro as José Menéndez
- Mishell Guaña as Kiepja/Rosa
- Sam Spruell as Colonel Martin
- Marcelo Alonso as Vicuña
- Adriana Stuven as Josefina Menéndez
- Mariano Llinás as Francisco Moreno
- Agustín Rittano as Captain Ambrosio
- Emily Orueta as Granddaughter
- Luis Machín as Monseñor

== Release ==
=== Festival ===
It had its world premiere on 22 May 2023, at the 76th Cannes Film Festival. then it was screened on 12 August 2023, in the Fiction Competition section of the 27th Lima Film Festival and soon on 7 September 2023, in the Centerpiece section at the 48th Toronto International Film Festival.

=== Distribution ===
MUBI announced that they have acquired distribution rights for multiple territories, including North America, Latin America, the UK, Italy, Switzerland, Austria, Germany, Turkey, India, and the Benelux. They plan to release the film theatrically in the UK and the US. Dulac Distribution released the film in France on 20 December 2023. Cinecolor Films released the film across Chile on 18 January 2024. It was released in Mexico on 25 January. Maco Cine released the film in Argentina on 1 February. The film was released in the United Kingdom and Ireland on 9 February. The film was released in Germany on 15 February. Lucky Dogs released the film in Sweden on 26 April.

== Reception ==
=== Critical reception ===
On the review aggregator website Rotten Tomatoes, 94% of 62 critics' reviews are positive. The website's consensus reads: "As harrowing as it is humane, The Settlers serves as a sharp-edged excavation of long-marginalized history." Metacritic, which uses a weighted average, assigned the film a score of 80 out of 100, based on 19 critics, indicating "generally favorable" reviews.

=== Accolades ===
Award	Date	Category	Recipient	Result	Ref.
Cannes Film Festival	21 May 2023	Caméra d'Or	Felipe Gálvez Haberle	Nominated	
Cannes Film Festival	21 May 2023	Un Certain Regard	Felipe Gálvez Haberle	Nominated	
Cannes Film Festival	21 May 2023	FIPRESCI Prize	Felipe Gálvez Haberle	Won	
Munich International Film Festival	1 July 2023	CineVision Award for Best Film by an Emerging Director	The Settlers	Nominated	
Lima Film Festival	18 August 2023	Best Picture	The Settlers	Nominated	
Lima Film Festival	18 August 2023	Best Screenplay	Felipe Gálvez & Antonia Girardi	Won	
Lima Film Festival	18 August 2023	Peruvian Association of Film Press - Best Film	The Settlers	Won	
San Sebastián International Film Festival	30 September 2023	Horizons Award	The Settlers	Nominated	
Festival du Nouveau Cinéma de Montreal	15 October 2023	Louve d'Or	The Settlers	Won	
Tokyo International Film Festival	1 November 2023	Tokyo Grand Prix	The Settlers	Nominated	
Stockholm International Film Festival	17 November 2023	Best Picture	The Settlers	Won	
IndieWire Critics Poll	11 December 2023	Best First Feature	The Settlers	5th Place	
Forqué Awards	16 December 2023	Best Latin-American Film	The Settlers	Nominated	
International Film Festival and Forum on Human Rights	18 March 2024	Fiction Grand Award	The Settlers	Won	
Platino Awards	20 April 2024	Best Ibero-American Debut Film	The Settlers	Nominated	
Platino Awards	20 April 2024	Best Art Direction	Sebastián Orgambide	Nominated	
Artios Awards	12 February 2025	Outstanding Achievement in Casting – International Film	Jessie Frost	Nominated	

== See also ==
- List of submissions to the 96th Academy Awards for Best International Feature Film
- List of Chilean submissions for the Academy Award for Best International Feature Film
