= God Is a Woman (film) =

2023 documentary film

- Directed by: Andres Peyrot
- Written by: Andres Peyrot; Elizabeth Wautlet
- Cinematography: Patrick Tresch; Nicolas Desaintquentin
- Edited by: Sabine Emiliani
- Music by: Grégoire Auger
- Release date: 1 September 2023 (Venice)
- Countries: France; Switzerland; Panama
- Languages: Spanish; Guna

God Is a Woman (French: Dieu est une femme) is a 2023 documentary film co-written and directed by Andres Peyrot, at his feature film debut. A co-production between France, Switzerland and Panama, it premiered at the 80th edition of the Venice Film Festival.

== Synopsis ==
The film analyzes the profund effects a long-lost film by Pierre Dominique Gaisseau had in the Panamanian Guna tribe. In 1975, Gaisseau moved to Guna with his wife and his daughter for a year, to shoot a documentary film about its matriarchal community; because of lack of funds, the film was originally confiscated and never released, leaving the Guna tribe feverishly waiting to see the film, which gradually acquired a mythical status within the community. Peyot first heard about this story at a film festival in 2010, and started working on a documentary investigating about the fate of the Gaisseau's documentary, and the impact it had on the Guna community.

== Production ==
The film marked the feature film debut of Andres Peyrot, who worked on the film for over ten years. It is produced by Industrie Films and Upside Films Productions in association with P.S. Productions.

== Release ==
The film had its world premiere at the 80th Venice International Film Festival, as the opening film of the Giornate degli Autori sidebar. It was later screened at other festivals, including the 2023 Toronto International Film Festival and the 2023 Stockholm International Film Festival. It was theatrically released in France on 4 April 2024.

== Reception ==
On the review aggregator website Rotten Tomatoes, 100% of 7 critics' reviews are positive, with an average rating of 6.0/10.
