= The Mass of Men =

- Directed by: Gabriel Gauchet
- Written by: Gabriel Gauchet; Rungano Nyoni
- Produced by: Emily Morgan
- Starring: Peter Faulkner; Jane McDowell
- Release date: 2012
- Country: United Kingdom
- Language: English

The Mass of Men is a 2012 British short film directed by Gabriel Gauchet, a student of the National Film and Television School (NFTS). Peter Faulkner stars as Richard, an unemployed man who is penalised for arriving late to a job centre appointment with his advisor Kate, played by Jane McDowell.

According to Gauchet, the film was based on the experiences of friends and family who were jobseekers and suffered similar humiliation.

It has been selected by 111 film festivals and is a winner of 58 awards. The film is one of the three films from the NFTS that swept the board at the annual CILECT awards in 2013.

== Plot ==
When Richard (Peter Faulkner), an unemployed man of 55, arrives three minutes late for an appointment at the job centre, Kate (Jane McDowell) penalises him for his tardiness. While she berates him, another man (Dominic Kinnaird), armed with a nail gun, attacks her.

== Accolades ==
The Mass of Men has won many awards.

- Locarno International Film Festival 2012 - Golden Leopard (Pardi di Domani) for Best International Short Film
- San Sebastian International Film Festival 2012 - First prize at the International Film Students Meeting
- Tampere Film Festival 2013 - Grand Prix
- BUFVC - Student Production Postgraduate Award 2013
- Royal Television Society Awards 2013 - Postgraduate Student Television Award
- 28th Alpinale Short Film Festival - Best International Short Film
- CILECT Prize - Best Fiction 2013
- Encounters Short Film and Animation Festival - NAHEMI prize
- Cyprus International Short Film Festival 2013 - Best International Short
- Molodist International Film Festival - Grand Prix of the Festival
