= Between Rings =

Zambian documentary film by Jessie Chisi

- Directed by: Jessie Chisi; Salla Sorri
- Written by: Jessie Chisi; Salla Sorri
- Release date: November 11, 2014 (Denmark)
- Running time: 92 minutes
- Language: English
- Budget: €250,000

Between Rings: The Esther Phiri Story is a documentary film co-written and co-directed by Zambian filmmaker Jessie Chisi, and Finnish director Salla Sorri. The film is about Esther Phiri, Chisi's cousin, who left her education and prospect of marriage to embark on a boxing career, and became seven-time world welterweight champion.

== Synopsis ==
The film tells Esther Phiri's story. She is famous for being Zambia's first female boxer, and for winning seven welterweight world championships. But her story started earlier, in the slums of Lusaka, where she was left impoverished by her father's death from malaria when she was 15, and then became a single mother at the age of 16. Education was not a possibility for her, as she spent her days selling fruit and vegetables at the outdoor market to survive. She became interested in boxing after a demonstration at an AIDS awareness event, and tells how she faced ridicule for this interest. However, Phiri persevered, in spite of pressure to marry and have children. In a country where the average life expectancy is 40, and over 80% of the population live in poverty, and where HIV/AIDS, at epidemic rates, is twice as likely to impact women – Phiri beat the odds in terms of both culture and gender, and became a success.

Phiri, who is sometimes called the "Laila Ali of Zambia" and sometimes "the real Million Dollar Baby", found herself torn, in the midst of her success, between her personal life and her professional goals. Her fame made her a symbol of women's independence – a position not everyone in her family or culture viewed as a positive thing. At the height of her success, she met a man to whom she became engaged, but found herself under pressure from her trainer not to marry because it would detract from her career, and on the personal side, to give up her career to invest in having a family. At that point, Phiri chose her career. This dilemma is a central theme of the film. In 2012, Phiri announced she was leaving boxing, though she made a comeback later on.

In the film, Phiri expresses her desire to see more girls and women pursue sports as a means to independence and empowerment, and a way to evade the many pitfalls of Zambian life, including poverty, drugs, crime and STDs. "This is the first time I’m really opening up for people to see me as Esther Phiri, the woman, not the boxer. It’s scary to be this open, but I think it’s important to share my story, so that people can see that even success comes with a price. We work hard, but we also have personal struggles to overcome. I hope my story shows young girls that they can do everything they want to do, and inspire them, no matter their circumstances."

Phiri's desire may be coming true, as more and more girls are taking up boxing in her country and are considered to have "raised the bar" in the sport.

== Production ==
The film, originally titled Woman on Hold before production was completed, was funded by the Finnish Film Foundation.

Chisi and Sorri first met Phiri at her gym in Lukasa in 2009, at the height of her career. Phiri had complained that she was tired of how the public and the media invaded her life, but agreed to expose herself in the documentary because the filmmakers promised her she could represent her own story in the film. Beyond the interest in Phiri's story because Chisi is related to her, the effect of her career in the region had been tremendous: Not only were Zambian girls entering the sport in increasing numbers, but neighboring Zimbabwe had also just allowed women to compete as professional boxers for the first time.

The co-directors followed Phiri for three years, accompanied by a small crew made up mostly of women, and documented her in both the public and her personal spheres.

== Release and reception ==
The film was screened at the Helsinki International Film Festival in September 2014, and made its international premiere in Denmark at the Copenhagen International Documentary Festival on November 11, 2014, to critical acclaim. It was nominated for the Nordic Dox Award. Screenings at additional international festivals followed, including the Göteborg International Film Festival in Sweden. The Zambian premiere of the film took place on International Women's Day, March 8, 2015.

== External list ==
- Between Rings at IMDb
