= Molly Windsor =

British actress

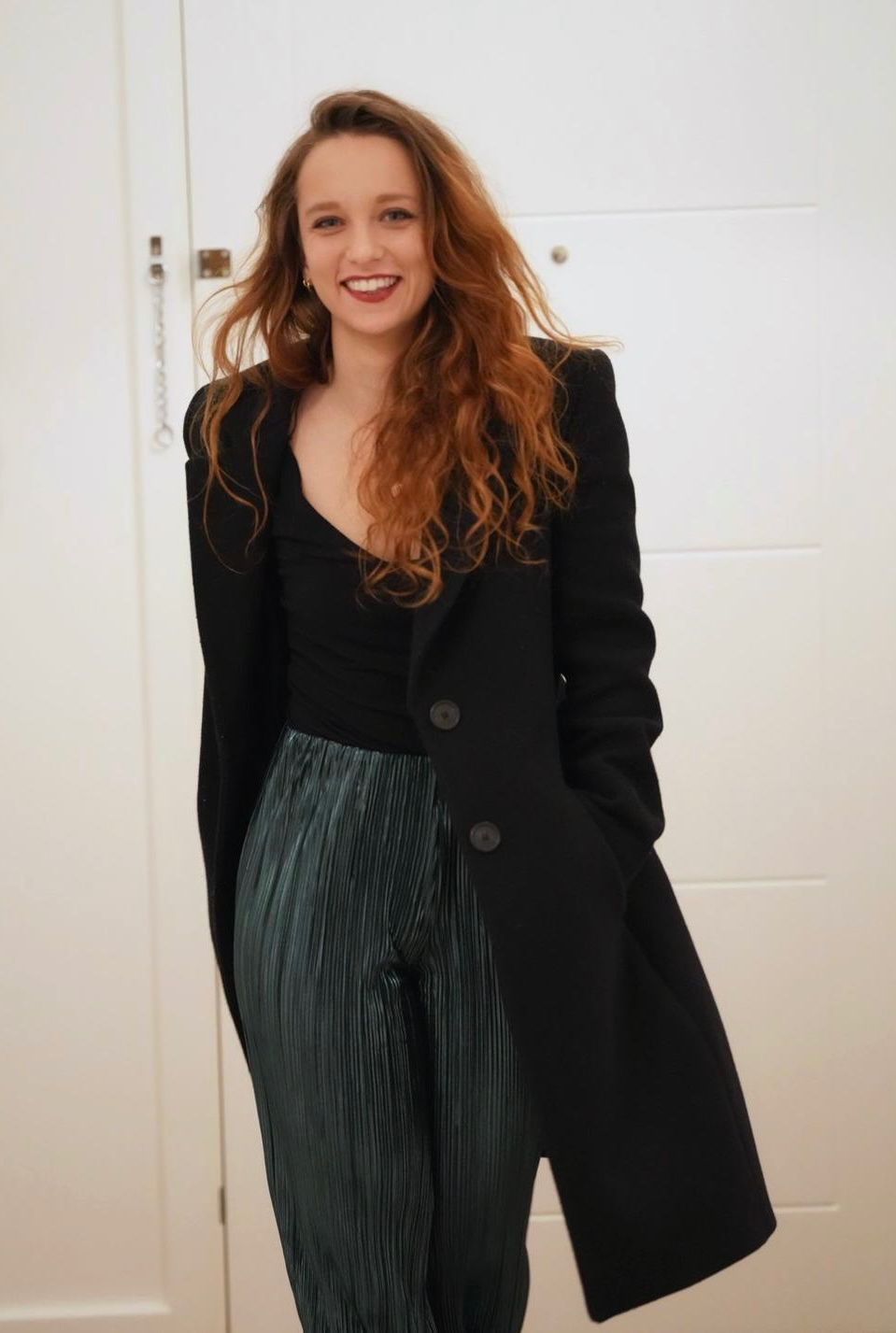
- Windsor in 2024
- Born: June 19, 1997 (age 28); Nottingham, England
- Occupation: Actress
- Years active: 2007–present
- Notable work: Three Girls

Molly Windsor (born 19 June 1997) is an English actress. Her breakthrough role as a child actress, was in the Channel 4 television film The Unloved (2009); She won the 2018 BAFTA TV Award for Best Actress for her role as Holly Winshaw in the BBC miniseries Three Girls (2017).

Other credits include Oranges and Sunshine (2010), Traces (2019), Make Up (2019), The Runaways (2019), War of the Worlds (2022), She Said (2022), and Unchosen (2026).

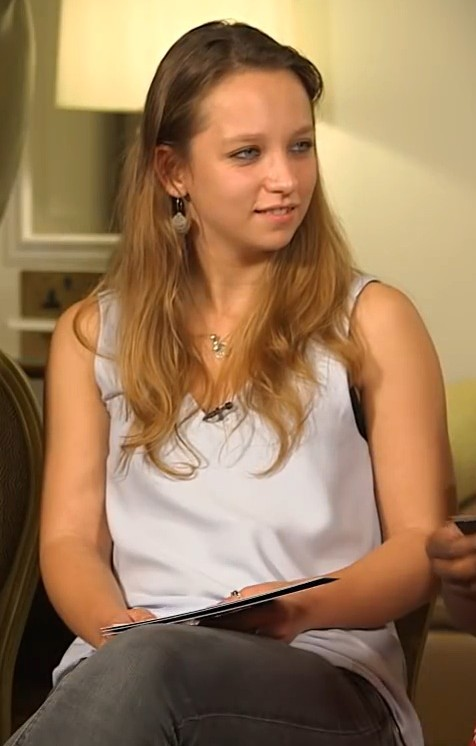
Molly Windsor in 2017

== Early life ==
Windsor was born 19 June 1997, and raised in Nottingham, England. was discovered by the writer and director of BAFTA-winning The Unloved, Samantha Morton, in a local drama school and casting agency, Rama Young Actors. Windsor attended the Nottingham Actors Studio, a not-for-profit CIC organisation, and the Television Workshop. She is currently represented by United Agents, London.

== Career ==
Windsor's first professional acting role was in 2009 as Lucy Manvers in the television movie The Unloved at age 11. The Times described her character as "played with an unsettling stillness". She played Margaret's daughter in the film Oranges and Sunshine (2010).

In 2017, she played Holly Winshaw, alongside Liv Hill, in the BBC miniseries Three Girls, which was based on the Rochdale child sex abuse ring, and for which she won the 2018 BAFTA TV Award for Best Actress.

In 2019, she played Angie in The Runaways, and played Ruth in the British psychological thriller film Make Up (2019).

Windsor played young Zelda Perkins, in the film She Said (2022), alongside Samantha Morton, who played the elder Perkins.

Windsor played the lead role of Rosie, alongside Asa Butterfield in Netflix psychological thriller Unchosen (2026).

== Recognition ==
In 2017, together with Jessie Buckley and Josh O'Connor, Windsor was named as a BAFTA Breakthrough Brit, one of the 20 members from the film, television and gaming industries.

== Filmography ==
=== Film ===
Year	Title	Role	Notes
2007	The Imaginary Girl	Amy	Short
2009	My Last Five Girlfriends	Kids at Camp	
2010	Oranges and Sunshine	Rachel	
2012	When the Lights Went Out	Pale Girl	
2017	Black Road	Lilly	Short
2017	Johnny Marr & Maxine Peake: The Priest	Homeless Girl	Video short
2018	The Runaways	Angie	
2019	Make Up	Ruth	
2022	She Said	Young Zelda Perkins	

=== Television ===
Year	Title	Role	Notes
2009	The Unloved	Lucy Manvers	TV movie
2017	Three Girls	Holly Winshaw	TV mini-series, 3 episodes Nominated — RTS Breakthrough Award - On Screen (2018); Winner — 2018 BAFTA TV Award for Best Leading Actress
2019	Cheat	Rose Vaughan	ITV drama series
2019	Traces	Emma Hedges	Alibi drama series, subsequently repeated on BBC1 in January 2021
2022	War of the Worlds	Martha	Third season of FoxNetworks / CanalPlus production
2026	Unchosen	Rosie	

== Awards and nominations ==
Year	Award	Category	work	Result	Ref.
2016	Screen International	Stars of Tomorrow 2020		Won	
2017	British Academy of Film and Television Arts	BAFTA Breakthrough Brit		Won	
2017	Royal Television Society Programme Awards	RTS Breakthrough Award	Three Girls	Nominated	
2018	Royal Television Society Programme Awards	RTS Breakthrough Award	Three Girls	Nominated	
2018	British Academy Television Awards	BAFTA TV Award for Best Actress	Three Girls	Won	
2021	London Film Critics Circle Awards 2020	ALFS Award - Young British/Irish Performer	Make Up	Nominated	
