= I Am Not a Witch =

2017 film

- British release poster
- Directed by: Rungano Nyoni
- Written by: Rungano Nyoni
- Produced by: Juliette Grandmont; Emily Morgan
- Starring: Maggie Mulubwa
- Cinematography: David Gallego
- Edited by: George Cragg; Yann Dedet; Thibault Hague
- Music by: Matthew James Kelly
- Distributed by: Artificial Eye (United Kingdom)
- Release dates: 25 May 2017 (Cannes); 20 October 2017 (UK)
- Running time: 93 minutes
- Countries: United Kingdom; France; Germany; Zambia
- Languages: English; Bemba; Nyanja
- Box office: $152,960

I Am Not a Witch is a 2017 tragicomedy drama film written and directed by Rungano Nyoni in her feature debut film.

It was screened in the Directors' Fortnight section at the 2017 Cannes Film Festival and won the BAFTA Award for Outstanding Debut by a British Writer, Director or Producer for Nyoni and producer Emily Morgan at the 71st British Academy Film Awards. It was selected as the British entry for the Best Foreign Language Film at the 91st Academy Awards, but it was not nominated.

== Plot ==
First we see a camp of witches, each with a white ribbon tied to her back, and tourists from a coach are looking at them through a fence.

Then a serious little girl shows up in a village, and it is accused of witchcraft by several villagers. When she refuses to answer questions confirming or denying she is a witch, she is taken to a witch doctor who sacrifices a chicken to determine whether she is a witch or not.

Believing she is a witch, the local authorities (a rich man) take her to a small camp made up of elderly witches, with white painted faces, each of whom is tied to their own large spool of white ribbon. The girl is restrained with a ribbon like the other witches and forced into labor. One of the elder witches names her Shula.

Shula is taken away to adjudicate at a trial where an elderly man has claimed that money has been stolen from him. When the suspects are lined up Shula does not know which one is the thief and telephones the other witches, who give her contradictory advice on how to choose the thief. Nevertheless, Shula is able to correctly guess who the thief is, and is rewarded for it.

A senior government employee and his wife take charge of her and take her to their home; the wife confides in Shula that even she has a ribbon, but she can take it off in the house because she has gained 'respectability' through her marriage. The man continues to exploit other people's belief that Shula is a witch by asking her to perform tasks like summoning rainfall. Shula is gradually exposed to what the wider community thinks of witches and is occasionally threatened with violence.

After a caller on a chat show asks why she is not in school, she is sent to a school for pupils, like Shula, who have been deemed unacceptable for mainstream education. A witch doctor and a farmer drag her away from the school by her ribbon, and demand she make it rain. She performs a rain dance and exhausts herself trying to produce results with no success. That evening the women back at camp ask her why she is unhappy, and she replies that she wishes she had opted to become a goat. When the women are asleep, she leaves the tent and gathers her ribbon to its end.

In the morning, two men dump a body in a field, and the 'witches' are seen mourning Shula, although it is unclear how she died or whether it is actually her body. As the women celebrate her death, it begins to rain heavily. The truck that carries the women around is shown to be empty; the ribbons that held them captive are flying free, and in the distance a goat bleats.

== Cast ==
- Maggie Mulubwa as Shula
- Nellie Munamonga as Police Officer
- Dyna Mufuni as Leader
- Nancy Mulilo as Charity
- Becky Ngoma as Bwalya
- Henry B.J. Phiri as Mr. Banda - the Government Official
- Margaret Spinella as Mama
- James Manaseh as Witch Doctor
- Margaret Z. Mwale as Mwape
- Miriam Nata as Florence
- Selita Zulu as Mubango
- Goodfellow Kayuni as Grandfather
- John ng'Ambi as Nelson
- Leo Chisanga as Drunk Man
- Azzion Nyrenda as Teacher

== Production ==
Writer-director Rungano Nyoni was inspired by actual stories of witchcraft accusations in Zambia. In her research for the film, she traveled to Ghana and spent time in a real witch camp, observing their daily life and rituals.

== Reception ==
On the review aggregator website Rotten Tomatoes, 98% of 84 critics' reviews are positive. The website's consensus reads: "I Am Not a Witch approaches real-life injustices with a beguiling blend of sorrow, anger, and humor, marking debuting writer-director Rungano Nyoni as an exciting new talent." On Metacritic, the film has a weighted average score of 80 out of 100 based on 20 critics, which the site labels as "generally favorable" reviews.

Mark Kermode from The Observer gave the film four out of five stars, praising Nyoni's work, David Gallego's cinematography and Mulubwa's performance, and wrote: "Rungano Nyoni’s debut feature, the story of a girl in Zambia accused of witchcraft, is comic, tragic – and captivatingly beautiful" Jessica Kiang from Variety, also praised Gallego’s cinematography, and stated: "Nyoni’s approach may itself be a little too chaotic, and a little too oblique to be fully comprehensible (in particular her counterpointing music cues can overreach, and some of the narrative ellipses confuse). But in the investigation of the dichotomies of ancient and modern, familiar and alien, prosaic and mystical, she clearly has a great deal she wants to say, and now, thanks to this invigorating, intriguing and provocative debut, she has a whole career ahead of her in which to say it".

Anna Smith, writing for Time Out, gave I Am Not a Witch four out of five stars, stating: "impressively, debut writer-director Rungano Nyoni makes this heady mix work". Stephen Dalton from The Hollywood Reporter called the film: "A winningly original and stylistically fresh debut feature from the young Zambia-born Welsh director Rungano Nyoni, I Am Not a Witch is one of the more buzzy premieres screening in the Directors' Fortnight in Cannes. A fable-like story about a young African girl banished from her village for alleged witchcraft, it blends deadpan humor with light surrealism, vivid visuals and left-field musical choices".

=== Accolades ===
I Am Not a Witch gathered several wins and nominations in many important film festivals and film awards, including a win at the 71st British Academy Film Awards for Outstanding Debut by a British Writer, Director or Producer and 10 nominations and three wins at the British Independent Film Awards 2017. It won Feature Fiction award at the 2017 Adelaide Film Festival.

== See also ==
- List of films about witchcraft
- List of submissions to the 91st Academy Awards for Best Foreign Language Film
- List of British submissions for the Academy Award for Best Foreign Language Film
