= Make Up (2019 film) =

2019 British film

- Directed by: Claire Oakley
- Produced by: Emily Morgan
- Starring: Molly Windsor; Joseph Quinn; Stefanie Martini
- Edited by: Sacha Szwarc
- Music by: Ben Salisbury
- Production companies: Quiddity Films; iFeatures; Protagonist pictures; Moffen Media Limited; BFI
- Distributed by: BBC Films; Creative England
- Release date: October 4, 2019 (London)
- Running time: 86 minutes
- Country: United Kingdom
- Language: English

Make Up is a 2019 British psychological thriller film, written and directed by Claire Oakley. It is Oakley's debut feature, set in a wintry caravan park in St Ives, Cornwall.

== Plot ==
Ruth is dropped off at a caravan park in Cornwall to live with her boyfriend Tom, who works there. She meets Shirley, the park manager, and Kai, the maintenance assistant. Kai escorts Ruth to Tom's caravan and Tom is pleased that his girlfriend is finally with him.

The next morning, Tom goes to work but wants Ruth to ask Shirley for a job. Instead, Ruth cleans up the caravan, finding red lipstick on the mirror and strands of long red hair in Tom's clothing.

Ruth takes the clothes to the laundry and she sees Tom speaking to a red-haired girl. Ruth tries to follow Tom, but he disappears. Confused, Ruth notices a strand of red hair caught on a wooden beam. Ruth then starts doing laundry and spills her money. Flustered, she picks up the coins but she gets help from a girl named Jade who works at the caravan site

Later, Ruth and Tom have dinner. They argue about Ruth not talking to Shirley regarding her getting a job. Ruth asks Tom if he knows a girl with red hair; he refuses to answer. Instead they both have a dance but Ruth remembers the lipstick on the mirror and bites Tom, who is taken aback but hugs her.

The next day, Ruth goes to Shirley's to enquire about the job. Shirley asks Ruth about her experience in work and also about Ruth's fear of water due to being unable to swim. Shirley says that the sea is a great healer, and hires Ruth to work in the caravans.

While walking back home, Ruth is aggressively approached by a German Shepherd. Kai restrains the dog. Ruth and Kai talk. She enquires about Tom's whereabouts to Kai who says that he's surfing.

Later that day Ruth confronts Tom about where he was. Tom says that he was finishing off Kai's workload. Ruth tells Tom that Shirley gave her the job, which pleases Tom.

The following day Ruth is working on linen, where she meets Jade again, as well as a young girl named Kippa. Ruth and Jade get to know each other at work. They both go to back to Jade's caravan where Ruth sees various wigs. Ruth sees a long red hair wig and asks Jade if she wears them. Jade says that she doesn't.

Jade, who also does manicures, gives Ruth new nails. While having the manicure, Ruth looks at Jade, unbeknownst to Jade who is fixing her nails. Later that night she tries to seduce Tom who doesn't reciprocate. Downhearted, Ruth decides to take off her nails. While doing so, she feels something in the room, which causes her to nearly collapse.

The next day Ruth asks what his neighbour's name is. Tom enquires as to why she wants to know her name. But he eventually answers that her name is April. Tom tells Ruth that Jade has a bit of a reputation and when Ruth asks about it, he refuses to elaborate. While at work, Ruth finds a brown furry jacket, putting it on and checking how she looks in the mirror. Putting the jacket on, Ruth is happy in it.

Later on that day, Ruth is waiting for Kippa to go swimming. Kippa coaches Ruth while they're in the water. However, Ruth is left alone for a few seconds. Kippa finds her and both go back to land. Ruth goes to the public shower, but hears moaning in the next shower, unsettling her.

Ruth excitedly tells Tom about the swimming but Tom berates her for going into the sea when she can't swim. Kai enters and says that Ruth can take care of herself, enraging Tom even more. Tom and Kai leave but Ruth remains. She looks at Tom's workshop wall, which has pictures of nude girls on it. Clearly interested, we the viewer see Ruth's hands having a nerve like attack.

Ruth goes to Jade's later that evening and talks about her relationship with Tom. Ruth asks Jade about her relationships but Jade says nothing. Ruth and Jade dance together but while doing so, both get close to each other and nearly kiss. Ruth gets scared and leaves in a hurry, getting drenched due to heavy rain.

In a nearby empty caravan she sees the red-haired girl inside, who looks at Ruth. Ruth quickly goes back to Tom's. While at Tom's, she tries to get close to Tom in bed. Tom asks her where she has been, and Ruth says Jade's. Tom moves away from Ruth, while she stays awake.

The next day both Ruth and Tom become more distant with each other. Ruth sees Jade smoking from a distance at work, but doesn't approach her.

She decides to go to Shirley's and says she had seen a red-haired girl in the caravans. However Shirley says that the caravans have been sealed shut, so no one can be in them. This leaves Ruth frustrated.

That night Ruth wakes up to find Tom getting dressed. She asks Tom where he's going. Tom says that April, the next door neighbour, has gone missing, and there's a search party being organised. Ruth decides to help as well.

She sees Jade in the search party, but they don't speak. Ruth looks around the empty caravans and finds one caravan with its lights on. She decides to go in and check the caravan. While inside she hears something being thrown on the window.

Ruth approaches the window and outside she sees the red-haired girl. Ruth tries to follow her and ends up in the public shower. She opens each shower door and finds her swimming suit still wet (from swimming with Kippa previously). There's a flashback to the shower scene where Ruth sees two women having sex. While watching, one girl has large abnormal nails and suddenly starts to bleed.

We go to the present, and Ruth finds April at the beach. Jade states that April isn't well, indicating dementia. She asks Ruth for a drink, but she declines and walks away. While walking, Ruth becomes upset and starts crying.

The next day Ruth is more distant with Tom. Tom sees this and asks if she regretted coming to Cornwall. Ruth replies bluntly that she came to the park to be with him. But its clear that her feelings have changed since arriving.

While watching TV together, the sound of the fox makes Ruth look outside. She sees Jade's caravan, but no lights are on. She turns to look at Tom, but Ruth is starting to feel pressure. As she is visibly upset and unhappy with Tom and her life.

The next morning, Ruth goes into the sea while it is rough. While nearly drowning, we see Ruth and the red-haired girl intertwined, indicating that the red-haired girl is Ruth, via her imagination or an spiritual guide.

Ruth comes out of the sea exhausted and frightened and is comforted by Jade, who helps her get dry. Jade gives Ruth her jacket, but Tom and Kai suddenly start fighting. The fight is broken up, and Ruth asks Kai what's wrong with him. Kai replies that he told Tom the truth about her and Jade.

Ruth follows Tom back to his caravan where Tom starts to pack Ruth belongings. Ruth asks Tom if he's throwing her out. Tom aggressively says that he knows about her and Jade. Ruth decides not to challenge Tom, and starts to walk away. In desperation, Tom tells Ruth he loves her, but she doesn't reply.

Upset, Tom storms out of his caravan but locks Ruth in. While being locked in, Ruth starts to cry, as she thinks about Jade. The scene cuts back to when Jade did her nails, where we see Ruth staring at Jade intently. In the same flashback scene, Jade equally stares at Ruth with affection. It is clear at this point that Ruth has feelings for Jade.

With determination, Ruth breaks out of Tom's caravan and goes to Jade's. Jade is not in but Ruth picks up the spare key. She changes, and puts on the brown furry coat that she previously tried on and a red hair wig. She then proceeds to go to the bonfire beach party.

When she enters the party, everyone looks at Ruth with her outfit on. At the bonfire she sees Tom drinking heavily on the hill. Unperturbed, Ruth begins to enjoy herself and starts dancing. As she's doing so she sees Jade walking away and decides to follow her.

When she catches up to Jade, she is surprised to see Ruth in her outfit. As both Ruth and Jade look at each other intensely, Ruth takes Jade to a secluded spot. Ruth then kisses Jade and Jade reciprocates.

While having sex, Jade takes off Ruth's wig and jacket as both embrace each other. In the next scene, Ruth is with Jade in bed. While Jade sleeps beside her, Ruth looks at her and smiles.

The following morning, Ruth gets up and looks at the sea with confidence. In the last scene, we see Ruth in calm waters smiling as Jade on the beach looks on.

== Cast ==
- Molly Windsor as Ruth, who starts to question herself and her relationship with Tom, after meeting Jade.
- Joseph Quinn as Tom, Ruth's controlling boyfriend who is very insecure about Ruth's friendship with Jade.
- Stefanie Martini as Jade, a seasoned worker at the park. And takes an immediate interest in Ruth.
- Lisa Palfrey as Shirley, the campsite manager.
- Theo Barklem-Biggs as Kai, Tom's work colleague. He is very aware of Ruth's and Jade's relationship.
- Elodie Wilton as Kippa

== Release ==
Make Up was screened on October 4, 2019 at the London Film Festival.

=== Critical reception ===
On the review aggregator website Rotten Tomatoes, 98% of 47 critics' reviews are positive. The website's consensus reads: "Make Up gets under the skin during its eerily unsettling descent into jealousy and paranoia -- and leaves the viewer wanting more from writer-director Claire Oakley." On Metacritic, the film has a weighted average score of 81 out of 100 based on 9 critics, which the site labels as "universal acclaim". In a highly positive review, Phil de Semlyen of Time Out called the film "magnificently unsettling", interested in "trapping you in its psychosexual maze and immersing you in the relatable pains of self-discovery."
