= Mwansa the Great =

- Directed by: Rungano Nyoni
- Release date: 2011
- Country: Zambia

Mwansa the Great is a 2011 film.

== Synopsis ==
While trying to prove he is a hero, Mwansa does the unforgivable and accidentally breaks his big sister Shula's special mud doll. He goes on a quest not only to fix it, but to finally prove he is Mwansa the Great.

== Awards ==
- FCAT 2011
- International Price - Silence, on court !
