= Felipe Gálvez Haberle =

Chilean filmmaker

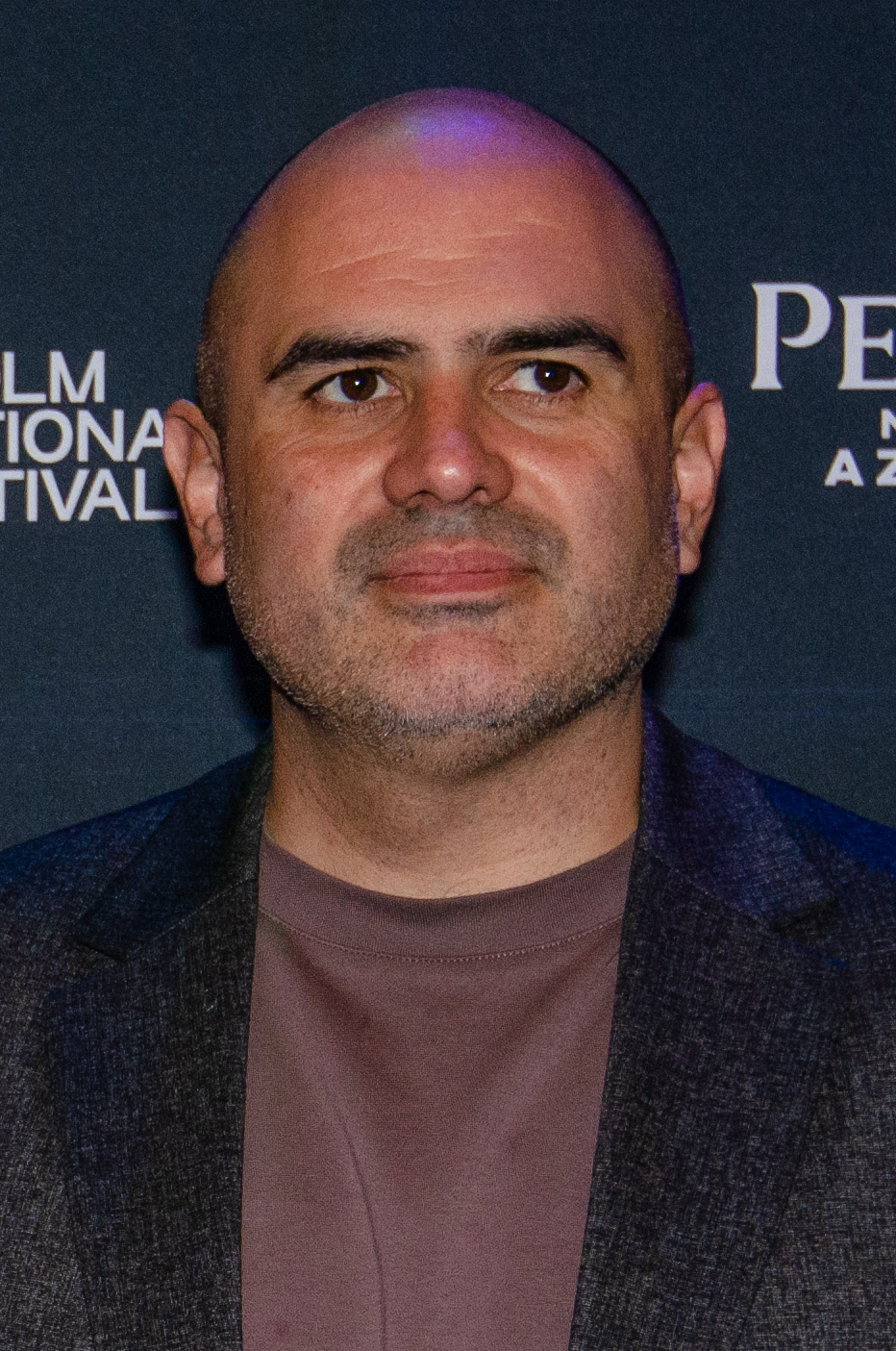
- Felipe Gálvez Haberle at Stockholm International Film Festival 2024.
- Born: Felipe Gálvez Haberle; 1983 (age 42–43); Santiago, Chile
- Occupations: Film director Screenwriter; Editor

Felipe Gálvez Haberle (born 1983, Santiago, Chile) is a Chilean film director, screenwriter, and editor. His directorial debut film, The Settlers, was awarded the FIPRESCI Prize at the 76th Cannes Film Festival who also competed for Un Certain Regard and Caméra d'Or.

== Biography ==
Gálvez graduated from the University of Cinema in Buenos Aires, Argentina. He has directed short films, including Be Quiet Please (Silencio en la sala) which received the best short film award at 2009 Buenos Aires International Festival of Independent Cinema, and I'm Always Looking From Here (Yo de aquí te estoy mirando), premiered at the International Film Festival Rotterdam in 2011. In 2018, he premiered the short film Raptor (Rapaz) in Critics' Week at the 71st Cannes Film Festival.

In 2023, he premiered his first feature film The Settlers at the 76th Cannes Film Festival where it competed for Un Certain Regard and Caméra d'Or, and won the FIPRESCI Prize, becoming the first Chilean production to win that award. Later that same year, the film was chosen by the Chilean Film Academy as the Chilean entry for Best International Feature Film at the 96th Academy Awards. The Settlers also won the Fiction Grand Award at the 22d FIFDH.

== Selected filmography ==
Short film

Year	Title	Director	Writer	Edited	Notes
2009	Be Quiet Please	Yes	Yes	Yes	
2011	I'm Always Looking From Here	Yes	Yes	Yes	

Feature film

Year	Title	Director	Writer	Edited	Notes
2023	The Settlers	Yes	Yes	No	Directorial debut

Editor credits

Year	Title	Edited	Notes
2010	Five	Yes	Short film
2010	Noche adentro	Yes	Short film
2010	Nothing But Thin Air	Yes	Short film
2011	Ortega	Yes	Documentary short
2015	In the Grayscale	Yes	
2016	The Last Land	Yes	
2016	You'll Never Be Alone	Yes	
2017	Princesita	Yes	
2018	Marilyn	Yes	
2021	The Great Movement	Yes	
