= Rungano Nyoni =

Zambian-Welsh filmmaker

- Born: Lusaka, Zambia
- Education: University of Birmingham; University Arts of London
- Occupations: Director; Screenwriter; Producer; Actress
- Years active: 2007–present

Rungano Nyoni is a Zambian-Welsh director, screenwriter and actress. She is best known for her feature-length films I Am Not a Witch and On Becoming a Guinea Fowl, both of which she wrote and directed. Both films received extensive international accolades. I Am Not a Witch won Nyoni the BAFTA for Outstanding Debut in 2018. On Becoming a Guinea Fowl earned her the 2024 Cannes Film Festival's Best Director - Un Certain Regard (Ex-aequo) award.

== Early life and education ==
Nyoni was born in Lusaka, Zambia to Merill Mutale (née Nyoni) and Thomas Nyoni. They chose to name her Rungano, which in the Shona language native to Zimbabwe means "storyteller." When she was nine years old her family migrated to Wales.

She attended the University of Birmingham, where she received a Bachelor of Commerce degree in Business Studies. After finishing her studies at the University of Birmingham, Nyoni decided to study acting at the University of the Arts London as it had always been her dream to become an actress. Nyoni went on to complete her master's degree in Drama and in 2009, graduated from Drama Centre London with a master's degree in acting. But it was during her second year that she decided she wanted to become a director, realizing that she was "far more into storytelling behind the camera than in front of it." She said she learned how to write and direct by learning how to act.

== Career ==
Nyoni's first important film influence was The Piano Teacher. She "wanted to be just like Isabelle Huppert" as her performance "had a huge effect on me. I quickly realized that I couldn't be like Isabelle Huppert because I'm not a very good actor, but I was still curious about the directing. That was a big turning point for me, realizing that if directing is done very well it can have a real effect on people."

In 2006, Nyoni released her first film Yande (meaning "My Great Happiness" in Bemba), which she wrote and shot on black and white super 8mm film. The film deals with fashion and African women who westernized their appearance and mannerisms in order to conform to an "ideal." She released her next two short films, 20 Questions and The List in 2009; the latter won a BAFTA Cymru Award in 2010.

Her fourth film, Mwansa the Great, was released in 2011 and was selected to screen at over 100 international film festivals. It was well received at the festivals and won over 20 prizes and was nominated for a 2012 BAFTA Award. Nyoni often collaborates with her partner Gabriel Gauchet and in 2012 a film directed by Gauchet and written by Nyoni, The Mass of Men, premiered at the Locarno Film Festival, where it won the Golden Leopard Award. Like Mwansa the Great, the film was selected to be shown at over 100 film festivals and also garnered over 50 prizes. This was followed up by her 2014 short Listen (Kuuntele), which received the Best Short Film Award at the 2015 Tribeca Film Festival.

In 2017, Nyoni released her first feature-length fiction film,I Am Not a Witch, which was selected to screen at the Directors' Fortnight of Cannes Film Festival 2017. This film went on to win Nyoni the awards for Best Director and Best Debut Director at the 20th British Independent Film Awards in 2017. The film also won Nyoni the BAFTA for Outstanding Debut in 2018 and has garnered accolades from international film festivals.

In 2024, Nyoni's second feature-length film On Becoming A Guinea Fowl debuted and earned her the Cannes Film Festival's Best Director - Un Certain Regard (Ex-aequo) 2024 award. The New York Times said of her direction that it needed no embellishment due to the richness of her characters, "She says all she needs to with each lapidary image, with every resonant silence and with the undaunted power of Shula’s gaze." The film, Nyoni told IndieWire, is an expression of herself, "For me, it's a conversation about how not everybody can speak up, and why."

== Filmography ==
=== Filmography ===
Year	Title	Director	Writer	Producer	Editor	Notes
2009	20 Questions	Yes				Short
2010	The List		Yes	Yes	Yes	Video Short, 20 minutes
2012	Africa First: Volume Two	Yes	Yes			Short film; seg. Mwansa the Great
2012	The Mass of Men		Yes			Short film, 17 minutes
2012	Mwansa the Great	Yes	Yes	Yes	Yes	Short film, 23 minutes
2013	Z1		Yes			Short film
2014	Listen (Kuuntele)	Yes	Yes			Short film, 13 minutes
2017	I Am Not a Witch	Yes	Yes			Feature film, 93 minutes
2024	On Becoming a Guinea Fowl	Yes	Yes			Feature film, 95 minutes

==== The List (2010) ====
A group of drama students are fixated on a surprise list as they are preparing for their final showcase.

==== The Mass of Men (2012) ====
When Richard, an unemployed man of 55, arrives three minutes late for an appointment at the job-centre, Kate penalizes him for his tardiness. To avoid plunging further into destitution, Richard takes desperate measures.

==== Mwansa the Great (2012) ====
The film follows three children: Mwansa, Shula and Tipa. They live in a small village outside of Lusaka, Zambia, with their mother; their father has recently died. The story focuses on the eight-year-old boy who aspires to be a hero and embarks upon a journey to prove his greatness, with unexpected consequences, to fix his sister's doll.

==== Z1 (2013) ====
After years of resentment and distrust in a faltering relationship, Ruth and Guy decide to go forward with their separation, but as their relationship ends their ten-year-old son Max, begins to behave strangely.

==== Listen (2014) ====
A Muslim woman wearing a burka goes into a police station, and begs the police to help her take action against her abusive husband. As she cannot speak the native language communication begins to break down between the two sides. A translator is brought, but she filters the experience through her own background and sides with the husband.

This film was produced by Nordic Factory, which specializes in stimulating cultural meetings between young filmmakers by giving them an international platform to work and collaborate with others on their early feature projects. Through the Nordic Factory, Nyoni and Hamy Ramezan collaborated to create Listen, which was re-released and showcased through Nordic Factories archival collection.

=== Actress ===
Year	Title	Role	Notes
2007	The Sarah Jane Adventures	Secretary	
2011	Secrecy	Lucy	
2010	Iron Doors		

== Awards and nominations ==
Awards and nominations for Rungano Nyoni
Year	Award	Category	Work	Result	Ref.
2017	British Academy Film Awards	Outstanding Debut by a British Writer, Director or Producer	I Am Not a Witch	Won	
2017	Adelaide Film Festival	International Feature Film Award	I Am Not a Witch	Won	
2017	Adelaide Film Festival	Foxtel Movies International Award	I Am Not a Witch	Won	
2017	AFI Fest	Audience Award	I Am Not a Witch	Nominated	
2017	Africa International Film Festival	Best Feature Film	I Am Not a Witch	Won	
2017	Mumbai Film Festival	Special Mention	I Am Not a Witch	Won	
2017	British Independent Film Awards	Best Director	I Am Not a Witch	Won	
2017	British Independent Film Awards	Douglas Hickox Award	I Am Not a Witch	Won	
2017	British Independent Film Awards	Best Screenplay	I Am Not a Witch	Nominated	
2017	British Independent Film Awards	Best Debut Screenwriter	I Am Not a Witch	Nominated	
2017	Cannes Film Festival	Caméra d'Or	I Am Not a Witch	Nominated	
2017	CPH:PIX	New Talent Grand PIX	I Am Not a Witch	Nominated	
2017	Independent Spirit Awards	Best International Film	I Am Not a Witch	Nominated	
2017	London Critics Circle Film Awards	Breakthrough British/Irish Filmmaker of the Year	I Am Not a Witch	Nominated	
2017	London Film Festival	First Feature Competition	I Am Not a Witch	Nominated	
2017	Filmfest München	Best Film By An Emerging Director	I Am Not a Witch	Nominated	
2017	Neuchâtel International Fantastic Film Festival	Best European Fantastic Feature Film	I Am Not a Witch	Nominated	
2017	Stockholm Film Festival	Best Directorial Debut	I Am Not a Witch	Won	
2017	Stockholm Film Festival	Bronze horse: Best Film	I Am Not a Witch	Nominated	
2018	Evening Standard British Film Awards	Breakthrough of the Year	I Am Not a Witch	Won	
2024	Zurich Film Festival	Feature Film	On Becoming a Guinea Fowl	Won	

In 2018, celebrating Black History Month in the United Kingdom, Nyoni was included in a list of 100 Brilliant, Black and Welsh people.
